= 15th AVN Awards =

US adult industry award ceremony in 1998

- History: The 1998 AVN Awards Show program cover
- Date: January 10, 1998
- Site: Caesars Palace, Paradise, Nevada
- Hosted by: Robert Schimmel; Racquel Darrian; Misty Rain
- Preshow hosts: Gary Gray; Williamson Howe
- Produced by: Gary Miller
- Directed by: Mark Stone

Highlights
- Best Picture: Bad Wives (Best Film)
- Most awards: Zazel (7)

Television coverage
- Network: Playboy TV

The 15th AVN Awards ceremony, organized by Adult Video News (AVN), took place January 10, 1998 at Caesars Palace, in Paradise, Nevada, U.S. During the show, AVN presented AVN Awards (the industry's equivalent of the Academy Awards) in 54 categories honoring the best pornographic films released between Oct. 1, 1996 and Sept. 30, 1997. The ceremony was produced by Gary Miller and directed by Mark Stone. Comedian Robert Schimmel hosted, with adult film actresses Racquel Darrian and Misty Rain as co-hosts. At a pre-awards cocktail reception held the previous evening, 50 more AVN Awards, mostly for behind-the-scenes achievements, were given out by hosts Nici Sterling and Dave Tyree, however, this event was neither televised nor distributed on VHS tapes as was the main evening's ceremony. Both events included awards categories for gay movies; the final year the show included both gay and heterosexual awards. The gay awards were subsequently spun off into a separate show, the GayVN Awards.

Zazel won the most awards with seven, however, Bad Wives, which received six statuettes, won for best film. Buda won for best shot-on-video feature. Nic Cramer won Best Director—Film for Operation Sex Siege.

== Winners and nominees ==
The winners were announced during the awards ceremony on January 10, 1998. Besides winning best film, Bad Wives also won Best Actress for Dyanna Lauren, Best Actor for Steven St. Croix and Best Screenplay for Dean Nash. Zazel was named best all-sex film and Naked Highway was the best gay video. Johnni Black won Best New Starlet, while Performers of the Year were: Stephanie Swift, female; Tom Byron, male; and Jim Buck, gay.

=== Major awards ===
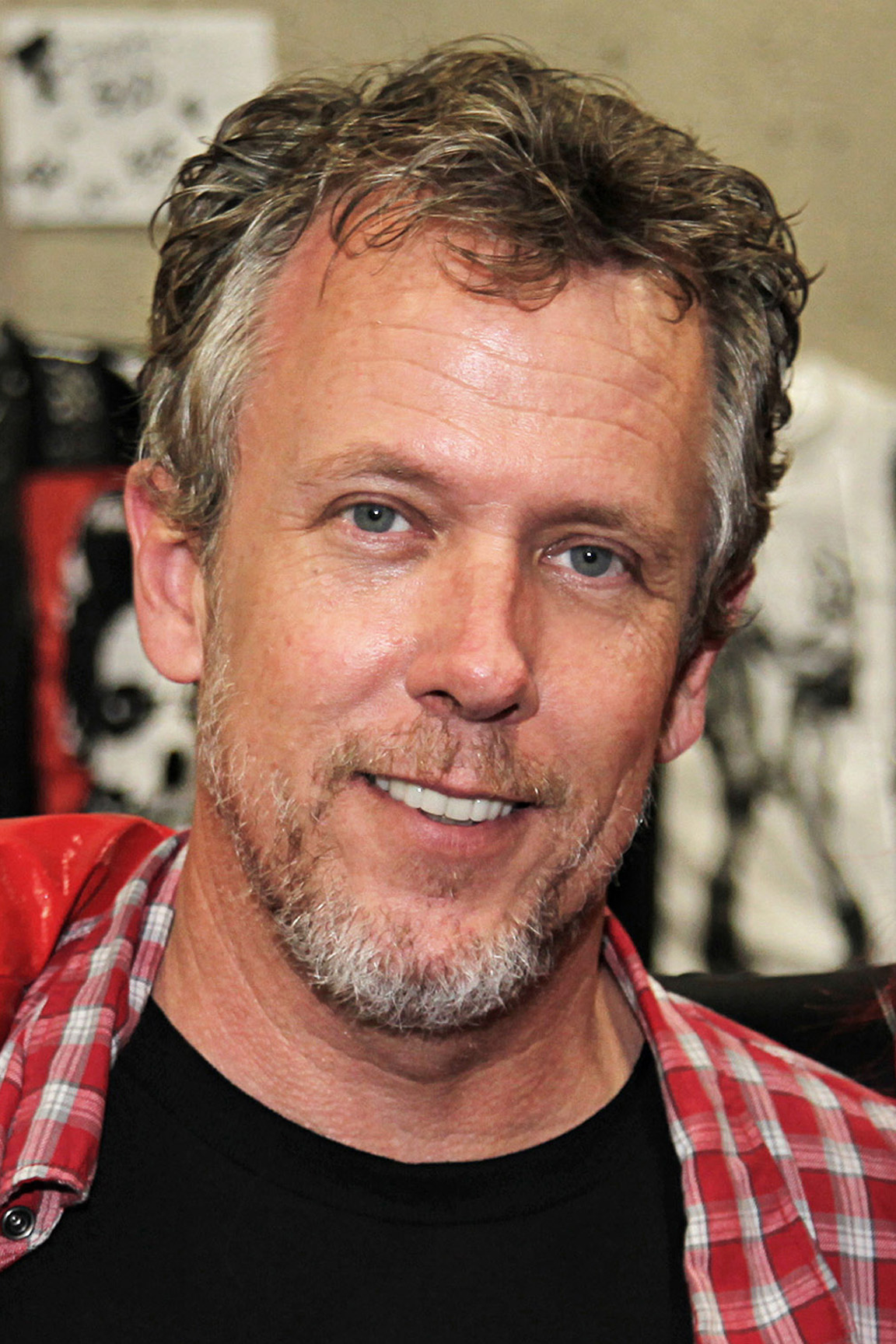
Tom Byron, Male Performer of the Year winner

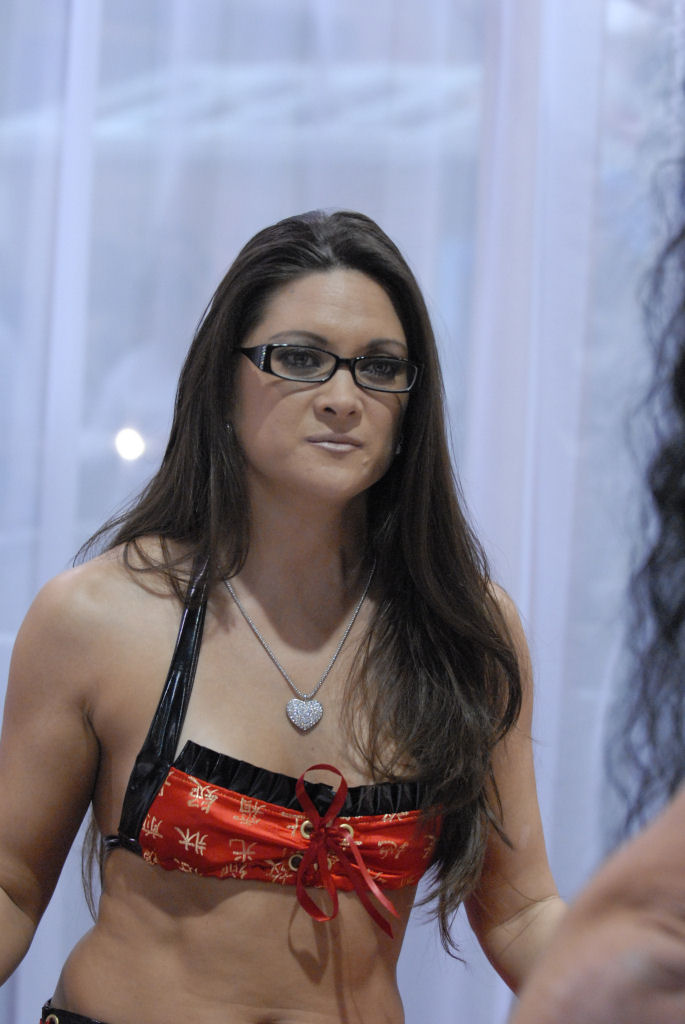
Stephanie Swift, Female Performer of the Year

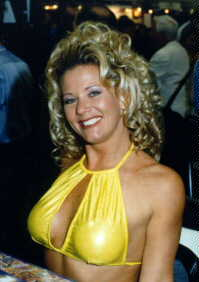
Johnni Black, Best New Starlet winner

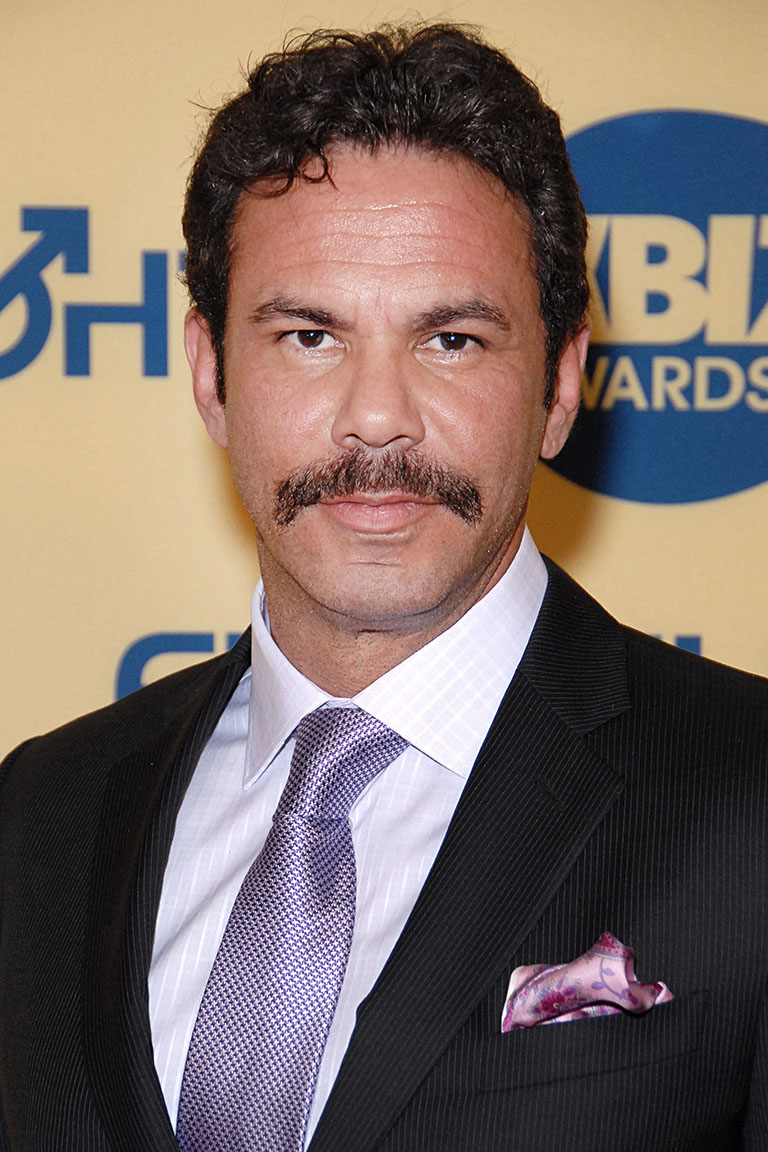
Steven St. Croix, Best Actor—Film winner

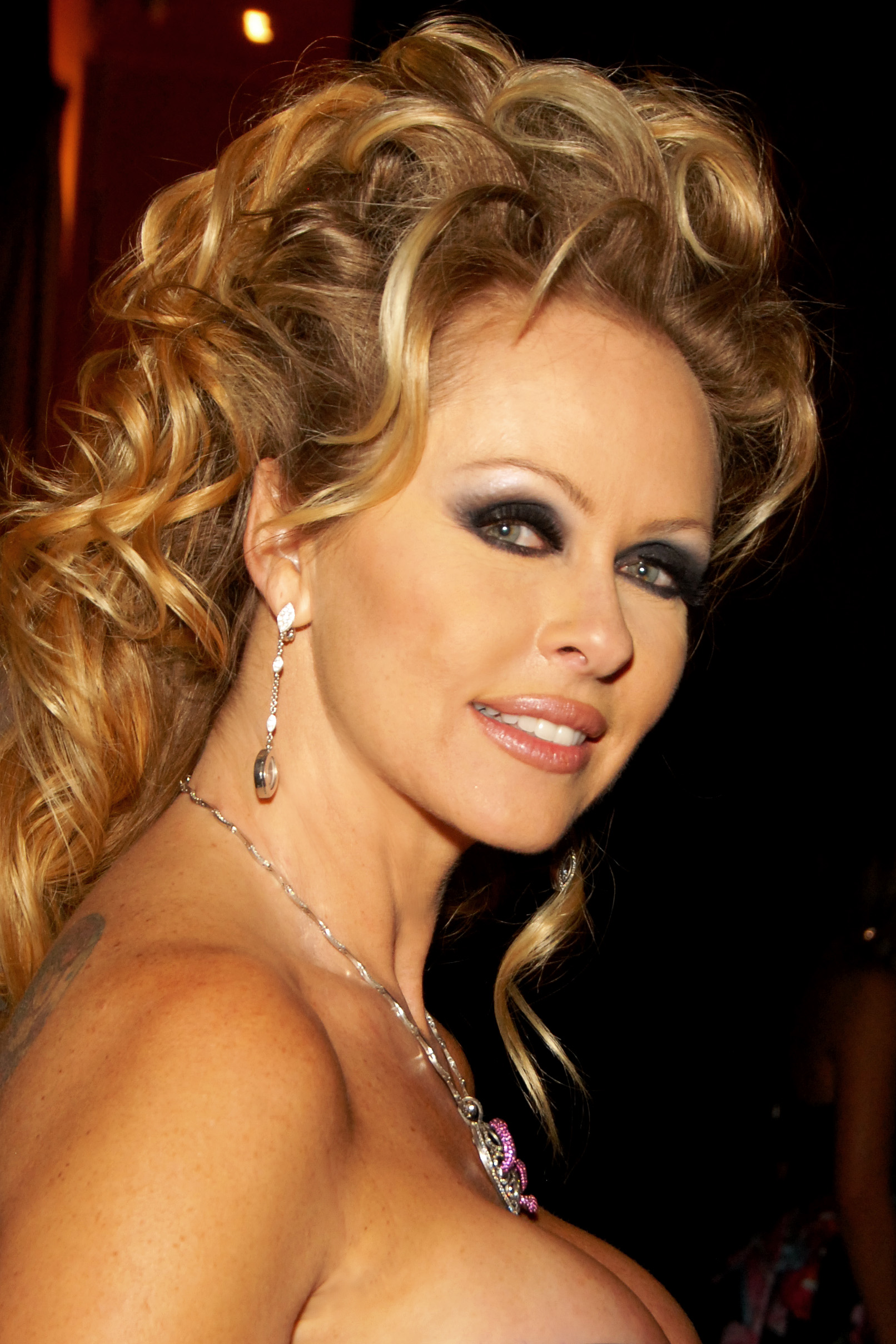
Dyanna Lauren, Best Actress—Film winner

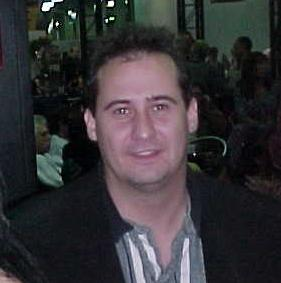
Nic Cramer, Best Director—Film winner

Winners are listed first, highlighted in boldface, and indicated with a double dagger (‡).

Best Film
**Bad Wives**‡; Africa Rising; Basic Elements; Control; Doin' the Ritz; Heat; Lisa; Operation Sex Siege; Red Vibe Diaries; Satyr; The Scope; Twisted; The Zone
Best Shot-on-Video Feature	Best Gay Video
**Buda**‡; All About Eva; Ancient Secrets of the Kama Sutra; Blue Dahlia; Crazed; Drop Sex: Wipe the Floor; Fountain of Innocence; The Gift; Indigo Delta; Impact; Miscreants; New Wave Hookers 5; Persona; Seduce & Destroy; A Week and a Half in the Life of a Prostitute	**Naked Highway**‡; An American in Prague; Anchor Hotel; A Body to Die For; Fallen Angel; Family Values; GoodFellas/BadFellas; Hard Core; High Tide; Jeff Stryker's Underground; Journey to Italy; A Love Story; Marine Crucible; Matador; Pleasure Principle; Tailspin
Male Performer of the Year	Gay Performer of the Year
**Tom Byron**‡; Mark Davis; Rod Fontana; Jack Hammer; Dave Hardman; Mr. Marcus; Sean Michaels; Rodney Moore; Ed Powers; Jake Steed; Max Steiner; Vince Vouyer	**Jim Buck**‡; Drew Andrews; Blue Blake; Matt Bradshaw; Rick Chase; Dino DiMarco; Paul Morgan; Johan Paulik; Richard Reyes; Lukas Ridgeston; Jeff White
Female Performer of the Year	Best New Starlet
**Stephanie Swift**‡; Chloe; Jill Kelly; Christi Lake; Dyanna Lauren; Shanna McCullough; Mila; Missy; Tiffany Mynx; Julie Rage; Jasmin St. Claire; Serenity; Stacy Valentine	Anita Blond; Angelica de la Sol; Angel Hart; LeeAnna Heart; Toni James; Midori; Mila; Alexandra Silk; Kobe Tai; Vicca
Best Actor—Film	Best Actress—Film
**Steven St. Croix, Bad Wives**‡; Buck Adams, Filth; Mickey G. The Zone; Mike Horner, Africa Rising; Mike Horner, Smoke & Mirrors; Mike Horner, Tight Spot; Jonathan Morgan, Sleaze; Tony Tedeschi, The Heist; Vince Vouyer, Control	**Dyanna Lauren, Bad Wives**‡; Julia Ann, The Heist; Lené Hefner, Control; Melissa Hill, Sweet Revenge; Heather Hunter, Heat; Jenna Jameson, Satyr; Dyanna Lauren, The Zone; Shanna McCullough, Tight Spot; Stacy Valentine, Red Vibe Diaries
Best Actor—Video	Best Actress—Video
**Tom Byron, Indigo Delta**‡; Mickey G., Surrender; Dave Hardman, A Pervert Walks Among Us; Mike Horner, Crazed; Mike Horner, Swinging in the Rain; Jonathan Morgan, Makin' Whoopee; Jonathan Morgan, Texas Dildo Masquerade; Wilde Oscar, Moondance; Tony Tedeschi, Blue Dahlia; Valentino, Drop Sex: Wipe the Floor	**Stephanie Swift, Miscreants**‡; Brittany Andrews, The Fanny; Davia Ardell, Makin' Whoopee; Juli Ashton, Scotty's X-Rated Adventure; Tricia Devereaux, A Week and a Half in the Life of a Prostitute; Morgan Fairlane, Restless Desire; Jeanna Fine, Night and Day 3; Nina Hartley, All About Eva; Kylie Ireland, Face Jam; Sharon Kane, Night of the Living Bi Dolls; Jill Kelly, Persona; Dyanna Lauren, Bad Girls 9; Shanna McCullough, Seduce & Destroy; Missy, Sinister Sister; Serenity, Crazed
Best Supporting Actor—Film	Best Supporting Actress—Film
**Wilde Oscar, Doin' the Ritz**‡; Mark Davis, Corporate Assets 2; John Decker, Tight Spot; Jon Dough, Bad Wives; Mickey G., Satyr; Dave Hardman, Doin' The Ritz; Wilde Oscar, Twisted; Joey Silvera, Heat; Tony Tedeschi, Filth; Tony Tedeschi, The Heist	**Melissa Hill, Bad Wives**‡; Asia Carrera, Satyr; Sindee Coxx, Control; Missy, Satyr; Julie Rage, Tattle Tales; Misty Rain, Red Vibe Diaries; Nikki Sinn, Tight Spot; Stephanie Swift, Temporary Positions; Kobe Tai, The Show 2
Best Supporting Actor—Video	Best Supporting Actress—Video
**Dave Hardman, Texas Dildo Masquerade**‡; Steve Austin, Swinging in the Rain; Tom Byron, Enchanted; Steve Drake, Uncontrollable Lust; Mickey G., Crazed; Steve Hatcher, Agent Muff ATF; Sean Michaels, Face Jam; Jonathan Morgan, Masters of Perversion; Peter North, Scotty's X-Rated Adventure; Kyle Stone, Lost Angels; Scott Styles, First Whore's Club	**Jeanna Fine, Miscreants**‡; Alyssa Allure, Glass Houses; Brittany Andrews, Swinging in the Rain; Candy Apples, Texas Dildo Masquerade; Juli Ashton, New Wave Hookers 5; Alex Dane, Night and Day 3; Alex Dane, Restless Desire; Jeanna Fine, New Wave Hookers 5; Nina Hartley, Ginger's Island; Melissa Hill, Indigo Delta; Missy, Surrender; Julie Rage, All About Eva
Best Director—Film	Best Director—Video
**Nic Cramer, Operation Sex Siege**‡; James Avalon, Red Vibe Diaries; Andrew Blake, Paris Chic/Dark Angel; Seymore Butts, Willy Red; Dinner Party 2; Stuart Canterbury, Africa Rising; Toni English, Heat; Kris Kramski, Klimaxx; Philip Mond, Zazel; Phil M. Noir, Twisted; Ralph Parfait, The Scope; Paul Thomas, Bad Wives; Paul Thomas, The Zone; Michael Zen, Satyr	**Robert Black, Miscreants**‡; Brad Armstrong, Ancient Secrets of the Kama Sutra; James Avalon, Blue Dahlia; François Clousot, SexHibition 5; Gregory Dark, Gregory Dark's The Psycho Sexuals; Teri Diver, Tom Elliott; Persona; Jim Enright, Seduce & Destroy; Toshi Gold, Skin 11: Unbound; Ernest Greene, Surrender; Jim Holliday, Sorority Sex Kittens 3; John Leslie, Drop Sex: Wipe the Floor; Cash Markman, Swinging in the Rain; Jonathan Morgan, Indigo Delta; Michael Ninn, New Wave Hookers 5; Jace Rocker, Makin' Whoopee; Candida Royalle, The Gift; John Stagliano, Buda
Best Director—Gay Video	Best All-Girl Feature
**Wash West, Naked Highway**‡; Sam Abdul, A Love Story; Paul Barresi, GoodFellas/BadFellas; Kristen Bjorn, Anchor Hotel; Bruce Cam, Robert Kirsch; Fallen Angel; Kevin Clarke, Pleasure Principle; Gino Colbert, John Trennel; Jeff Stryker's Underground; Chip Daniels, Marine Crucible; Jerry Douglas, Family Values; George Duroy, An American in Prague; Lucas Kazan, Journey to Italy; Derek Kent, A Body to Die For; Chi Chi LaRue, Hard Core; John Rutherford, High Tide; John Travis, Tailspin; Michael Zen, Matador	**Diva 4**‡; Buttslammers 15; Catlickers 4; Diva; Everybody Wants Some 3; Femania; Jenna's Built for Speed; Nasty Girls 15; Possessions; Shane's World 6; Violation of Jill Kelly; Where The Boys Aren't 9
Best Foreign Release	Best European Release (The Hot Video Award)
**The Fugitive 1 & 2**‡; Anita; Betty Bleu; Cold Desire; Dead Man's Wish; Euro Angels; The Magnificent 7 Girls; Messalina, The Virgin Empress; Immortal; In Your Dreams; Rebecca in Paris II; Sexy Killer "Nikyta"; Skin: The 8th Consecration; Torero; Virility	**President by Day, Hooker by Night**‡; Beauty and the Beast; No Entry to the Public; The Magnificent Seven; Mamma
Best All-Sex Film	Best All-Sex Video
**Zazel**‡; Dark Angel; Dinner Party 2; Klimaxx; Paris Chic	**Fresh Meat 4**‡; America's 10 Most Wanted 2; Bombshell; Decadence; Dirty Days in Hollywood; Dreamscape; Filthy Coeds; Liquid Lust; Gregory Dark's The Psycho Sexuals; Skin 11: Unbound; Sodomania 21; World Sex Tour 10; World Sex Tour 11
Best Gonzo Video	Best Sex Comedy
**Voyeur 7 & 8: Live in Europe**‡; Assman; Ben Dover's Little Smart Asses; Buttman in Barcelona; Butt Row Euro Style; Buttwoman '97; Cunt Hunt 2; Gluteus to the Maximus; Lil' Women: Vestal Virgins; Max World 7: Tube Steak Boogie; Nice Fuckin' Movie; Rock 'n Roll Rocco; Shameless Desire; Shane's World 5; Tom Byron's Cumback Pussy 7	**Cellar Dwellers II**‡; The Fanny; A Little Piece of My Heart; Makin' Whoopee; A Pervert Walks Among Us; Rainwoman 10; Raw Footage; South by Southeast; Suggestive Behavior; Swinging in the Rain; Texas Dildo Masquerade; Women Behaving Badly
Best Selling Tape of the Year	Best Renting Tape of the Year
**Zazel**‡; Bad Wives; Buttman in Barcelona; Dinner Party 2; New Wave Hookers 5; Rocco More Than Ever; Rock 'n' Roll Rocco; Satyr; Sodomania 22; Where the Boys Aren't 9; Wicked Weapon; The World's Luckiest Man	**New Wave Hookers 5**‡; Bad Wives; Ben Dover's English Asscapades; Bottom Dweller 5; Buttman in Barcelona; Buttman's Bend Over Babes IV; Drop Sex: Wipe the Floor; The Pyramid 3; Rocco's Private Fantasies; Satyr; Seymore butts: Gluteus to the Maximus; Zazel
Best Couples Sex Scene—Film	Best Couples Sex Scene—Video
**Misty Rain, Marc Wallice; Red Vibe Diaries**‡; Jon Dough, Dyanna Lauren; Bad Wives; Lené Hefner, Vince Vouyer; Control; Asia Carrera, Steve Hatcher; Corporate Assets 2; Sean Michaels, Stephanie Swift; Dinner Party 2; Heather Hunter, Steven St. Croix; Heat; Alec Metro, Liza Harper; Lisa; Nikki Tyler, Rocco Siffredi; Nikki Loves Rocco; Alex Sanders, Alyssa Love; Red Vibe Diaries; Asia Carrera, Mickey G.; Satyr; Steven St. Croix, Ruby (actress); The Show 2; Shanna McCullough, Tony Martino; Tight Spot; Gina LaMarca, Jon; Zazel	**Rocco Siffredi, Ursula Moore; Buda**‡; Dyanna Lauren, Peter North; Bad Girls 9; Tony Tedeschi, Roxanne Hall; Blaze; Ruby (actress), Colt Steele; Boobwatch; Fernanda, Deniro; Brazil on Butt Row; Rocco Siffredi, Elizabeth Shay; Buttman in Barcelona; Van Damage, Nikki Smalls; Filthy Coeds; Mark Davis, Shanna McCullough; The Gift; Missy, Mickey G.; Heart & Soul; Alex Sanders, Serenity; Lost Angels; Nikita, Mickey G.; Gregory Dark's The Psycho Sexuals; Ona Zee, Mark Davis; Sex 4 Hire; Roxanne Hall, John Decker; SexHibition5; Sindee Coxx, T. T. Boy; Sorority Sex Kittens 3; T. T. Boy, Yumi; Wild Bananas on Butt Row
Best Group Sex Scene—Film	Best Group Sex Scene—Video
**Anna Romero, Sasha Vinni, Drew Reese, Kevin James; Zazel**‡; Steven St. Croix, Melissa Hill, Stephanie Swift; Bad Wives; Vince Vouyer, Sindee Coxx, Lexus; Control; Shanna McCullough, Davia Ardell, Peter North; Doin' the Ritz; Marcella Reeves, Leslie Grant, Omar Williams; Klimaxx; Hijackers' Boat Orgy, Operation Sex Siege; Stacy Valentine, Maya, David Steele; Red Vibe Diaries; Jenna Jameson, Brad Armstrong, Mickey G.; Satyr; Stacy Valentine, Tom Byron, Peter North; Satyr; Johnni Black, Kyle Stone, Vince Vouyer; Temporary Positions; Krista Maze, T. T. Boy, Alex Sanders; Twisted; Sasha Vinni, Brooke Lane, Helene, Antonio Valentino; Zazel; Dyanna Lauren, Byron Long, Weed; The Zone	**Peter North, Alyssa Love, Holli Woods, Katie Gold, Shay Sweet; Gluteus to the Maximus**‡; Orgy scene (Dyanna Lauren, Papillon, Tatiana, Jon Dough, Peter North, Vince Vouyer); Ancient Secrets of the Kama Sutra; Ann, Alberto Ray, Paschal, Ben Dover; Ben Dover's Little Smart Asses; Chloe, Roxanne Hall, Marc Wallice; Blue Dahlia; Opening orgy (Monika Kiss, Holly Black, Reka Gabor, Szilvia, Leslie Taylor, Steve Hard, Zenza Raggi, John Walton); Buda; Jake Steed, Mark Davis, Mikki Malone, Leah Dawn, Rainahh; Butt Row Unplugged; Jake Steed, Lauren Montgomery, Monti; Drop Sex: Wipe the Floor; Serenity, Alex Sanders, Sindee Coxx; Lost Angels; Dru Berrymore, Jack Hammer, Liza Harper, Randi Lee, Tom Byron; Miscreants; Airin, K. C., Ed Powers, Jake Steed, Bobbi; More Dirty Debutantes 71; Mickey G., Missy, Ruby, Chloe; Gregory Dark's The Psycho Sexuals; The orgy (Clarissa Bruni, Elizabeth King, Eva, Heidy Cassini, Illana Moore, Jeanette La Douce, Lenka Veborova, Olga Lovi, Dina Pearl, Regina Sipos, Stephanie Silver, Samantha del Rio, Katarina Martinez, Sophie Call, Cassandra, Vivienne Clash, Andrea Nobili, Andrea Spider, Christoph Clark, Francesco Malcom, Jean-Yves Le Castel, Pavel Sahaj, Richard Langin, Robert Rosenberg, Roberto Malone, Rocco Siffredi, Silvio Evangelista, others); Rock 'n' Roll Rocco 2: Backstage Pass; Jacklyn Lick, Missy, T. T. Boy; Sinister Sister; T. T. Boy and 15 women; Sorority Sex Kittens 3; Erika Bella, Zoltan Cowboy, [Dorian Lux, Leslie Taylor; The Voyeur 10; Precious Silver, Marc Wallice, Kyle Stone, Brian Surewood; A Week and a Half in the Life of a Prostitute
Best All-Girl Sex Scene—Film	Best All-Girl Sex Scene—Video
**Missy, Jenna Jameson, Satyr**‡; Sally Layd, Traci Angel; Africa Rising; Dyanna Lauren, Stephanie Swift, Jenteal; Censored; Melissa Hill, Lené Hefner; Control; Heather Hunter, Jenteal, Misty Rain; Heat; Tabitha Stevens, Nikki Tyler, Melissa Hill; Nikki Loves Rocco; Deva Station, Charlie; Red Vibe Diaries; Missy, Asia Carrera; f; Sasha Vinni, Nikie St. Gilles; Zazel; Lené Hefner, Sasha Vinni, Devin; Zazel; Dyanna Lauren, Kobe Tai; The Zone	**Jeanna Fine, P. J. Sparxx, Tricia Devereaux; Cellar Dwellers II**‡; Caressa Savage, Nici Sterling; Anal Aristocrats; Tiffany Mynx, Coral Sands, Tonisha Mills, Raylene; Buttwoman '97; Sindee Coxx, Felecia; Club Imagination; Serenity, Missy; Crazed; Vicca, Laura Palmer; Diva; Liza Harper, Mila, Kitana Steel, Erika Lockett, Zasu Knight, Amber; Everybody Wants Some 3; Misty Rain, Tiffany Mynx; First Time Ever: The New Harvest; Jenna Jameson, Missy, Nadia Moore; Jenna's Built for Speed; Taylor Hayes, Jordan McKnight; Musical Tushies; Jacklyn Lick, Missy, Ruby; Nasty Girls 14; Juli Ashton, Asia Carrera, Felecia; New Wave Hookers 5; Shayla LaVeaux, Jill Kelly; Not the Lovin' Kind; Summer Knight, Caressa Savage; Pussyman Takes Hollywood; Missy, Jill Kelly, Felecia, Alexis; Shameless Desire; The power drill orgy (Brianna Lee, Caressa Savage, Gina Rome, Julie Rage, Kiss, Sally Layd); Violation of Brianna Lee; Dyanna Lauren, Chasey Lain, Janine Lindemulder; Where the Boys Aren't 9

=== Additional award winners ===
These awards were announced, but not presented, in a winners-only segments read by Robert Schimmel and Misty Rain during the event. Recipients' awards were distributed off-stage:

- Best All-Girl Series: Diva
- Best Anal Sex Scene—Film: Steven St. Croix, Dyanna Lauren; Bad Wives
- Best Anal Sex Scene—Video: Careena Collins, Mark Davis, Sean Michaels; Butt Banged Naughty Nurses
- Best Anal-Themed Feature: Gluteus to the Maximus
- Best Boxcover Concept: Ancient Secrets of the Kama Sutra, Vivid Video
- Best Continuing Video Series: Fresh Meat
- Best Director—Foreign: Pierre Woodman, The Fugitive 1 & 2
- Best Ethnic-Themed Video: Midori's Flava
- Best Featurette Tape: Heart & Soul
- Best Foreign Featurette Tape: Private Stories 22
- Best Gangbang Tape: Gangbang Girl 19
- Best Gonzo Series: Tom Byron's Cumback Pussy
- Most Outrageous Sex Scene: Mila, Kiss, "Anal Food Express", My Girlfriend's Girlfriends
- Best Overall Marketing Campaign—Company Image: VCA Pictures
- Best Overall Marketing Campaign—Gay Video: Family Values, Men of Odyssey
- Best Overall Marketing Campaign—Individual Title or Series: Zazel, Cal Vista Films/Metro
- Best Packaging—Film: Paris Chic, Studio A Entertainment
- Best Packaging—Video: Makin' Whoopee, Cal Vista Video/Metro
- Best Sex Scene—Foreign: Double Ship Orgy, Private Stories 16
- Best Solo Sex Scene: Vicca, Diva
- Best Tease Performance: Silvia Saint, Fresh Meat 4

The previous night, January 9, 1998, during AVN's pre-awards cocktail reception, hosts adult film actress Nici Sterling and comedian Dave Tyree handed out these awards, mostly for behind-the-scenes excellence:

- Best Actor—Gay Video: Jim Buck, Naked Highway
- Best Advertisement: The World's Luckiest Man, Hustler/Vivid
- Best Alternative Adult Feature Film: Crash
- Best Alternative Adult Film Featurette or Specialty Tape: Jenny McCarthy: The Playboy Years
- Best Alternative Adult Video: 10th Anniversary Colorado River Wet T&A, Vols. 1 & 2
- Best Amateur Series: Catalina L'Amour
- Best Amateur Tape: Southern Belles 8
- Best Art Direction—Film: Zazel
- Best Art Direction—Gay Video: Doin' Time 2069, Part 2
- Best Art Direction—Video: New Wave Hookers 5
- Best Bisexual Video: Night of the Living Bi Dolls
- Best Boxcover Concept—Gay Video: Matador, All Worlds Video
- Best CD-ROM Graphics/Art Direction: UltraVixen
- Best CD-ROM Photo Disc: Super Models 1
- Best Cinematography: Philip Mond, Zazel
- Best Compilation Tape: The Voyeur's Favorite Blow Jobs & Anals
- Best Director—Bisexual Video: Josh Eliot, Night of the living Bi Dolls
- Best Editing—Film: James Avalon, Zazel
- Best Editing—Gay Video: Wash West, Dr. Jerkoff & Mr. Hard
- Best Editing—Video: John Leslie, Drop Sex: Wipe the Floor
- Best Explicit Series: Filthy Fuckers
- Best Gay Alternative Release: Summer, The First Time
- Best Gay Solo Video: Titan Men—Alone in the Backwoods
- Best Gay Specialty Release: Fallen Angel
- Best Interactive CD-ROM (Game): Dadahouse
- Best Interactive CD-ROM (Non-Game): Virtual Sex with Asia
- Best Music: Toshi Gold, Skin 11: Unbound
- Best Music—Gay Video: Tom Alex and Sharon Kane, A Love Story
- Best Newcomer—Gay Video: Jim Buck
- Best Non-Sex Performance—Film or Video: Jamie Gillis, New Wave Hookers 5
- Best Non-Sex Performance—Gay, Bi or Trans Video: Sharon Kane, Family Values
- Best Original CD-ROM Concept: Fischer's Erotic Encyclopedia
- Best Packaging—Gay Video: Tailspin, Studio 2000
- Best Packaging—Specialty: Spiked Heel Diaries 8, Bizarre Video
- Best Pro-Am Series: Filthy First Timers
- Best Pro-Am Tape: More Dirty Debutantes 71
- Best Screenplay—Film: Dean Nash, Bad Wives
- Best Screenplay—Gay Video: Wash West, Naked Highway
- Best Screenplay—Video: Jonathan Morgan, Crazed
- Best Sex Scene—Gay Video: Jeff Stryker, Derek Cameron; Jeff Stryker's Underground
- Best Special Effects: New Wave Hookers 5
- Best Specialty Tape—Big Bust: Mandy Mountjoy Does Hardcore
- Best Specialty Tape—Bondage: Kym Wilde's On the Edge 40
- Best Specialty Tape—Other Genre: Hardcore Male/Female Oil Wrestling
- Best Specialty Tape—Spanking: Disciplined by the Cane
- Best Supporting Performer—Gay Video: Bo Summers, Family Values
- Best Trailer: New Wave Hookers 5
- Best Trans Video: I Dream of Queenie
- Best Videography: Justin Sterling, Barry Harley; Diva, The Series
- Best Videography—Gay Video: Wash West, Naked Highway

=== Honorary AVN Awards ===
==== Special Achievement Awards ====
- Al Goldstein, "for his lifelong defense of the First Amendment"
- Christy Canyon, "for her lifetime achievement in the adult video industry"
- Dave Friedman, "one of the founding fathers of the adult film and video industries"

==== AVN Breakthrough Award ====
Presented to Steve Orenstein of Wicked Pictures; the other nominees were Robert Black and Tom Byron

==== Hall of Fame ====
AVN Hall of Fame inductees for 1998, announced during AVN's pre-awards cocktail reception, were: Lois Ayres, Rene Bond, Jerry Butler, Careena Collins, Jon Dough, Jerry Douglas, Roy Karch, Keisha, Dorothy LeMay, Chelsea Manchester, Constance Money, Paul Norman, Jace Rocker, Derek Stanton, Jane Waters, Bambi Woods

=== Adult Internet Awards ===
The 1998 Adult Internet Awards winners were announced at another time later in the year and were not part of the show:

- Best Overall Site: Fuck Force 5 (FF5)
- Best Overall Gay Site: Chisel Media
- Best Live Video Feed: Python Communications Inc.
- Best Live Video Service Bureau: BabeNet Ltd.
- Best Pictorial Site: Kara's Adult Playground
- Best Performer or Personal Site: Danni's Hard Drive
- Best Use of Plug-ins: Fuck Force 5 (FF5)
- Best Animation: Fuck Force 5 (FF5)
- Best Customer Service Department: BabeNet
- Best Clickthrough Program: Smart Bucks
- Most User-Friendly Site: Manzone
- Best Graphics: Adult Online Network
- Best Retail Site: Adult DVD Xtreme
- Best Marketing Campaign: Purehardcore
- Best Links Site: Persian Kitty's Adult Links
- Best E-Zine: Vavoom
- Best Video-on-Demand Interface: Slut TV
- Best Chat Interface: Python Premium Pack

PEOPLE'S CHOICE AWARDS:

- Best Free Site: Web Voyeur
- Best Free Pictorial Site: Collectors Gallery
- Best Free Performer or Personal Site: Asia Carrera's Buttkicking Homepage

=== Multiple nominations and awards ===
Zazel won the most awards with seven; Bad Wives was next with six statuettes.New Wave Hookers 5 scored five.

== Presenters and performers ==
The following individuals presented awards or performed musical numbers or comedy. Presenters of the gay awards were not recorded. The show's trophy girls were Candy Roxxx and Katie Gold.

=== Presenters (in order of appearance) ===
Name(s)	Role
Nina Hartley; Chi Chi LaRue; Nici Sterling; Jenteal	Presenters of the awards for Best Supporting Actor and Best Supporting Actress in a feature film
Victoria Paris; Stacy Valentine; Ron Jeremy; Sid Deuce	Presenters of the awards for Best Couples Sex Scene—Film and Best Couples Sex Scene—Video
Stephanie Swift; Jonathan Morgan; Lexus Locklear; Nico Treasures	Presenters of the awards for Best All-Girl Sex Scene—Video and Best All-Girl Sex Scene—Film
Jasmin St. Claire; Tricia Devereaux; Zoë; Harmony Grant	Presenters of the awards for Best Group Sex Scene—Video and Best Group Sex Scene—Film
Mr. Marcus; Rocki Roads	Presenters of the awards for Best Selling Tape of the Year and Best Renting Tape of the Year
Monique Covét; Claudio; Christi Lake; Max Hardcore	Presenters of the awards for Best Foreign Release and Best All-Girl Feature
Kobe Tai; Mark Davis; John Decker; Roxanne Hall	Presenters of the awards for Best Supporting Actor—Video and Best Supporting Actress—Video
Anita Rinaldi; Jade; David Chryso	Presenters of the Hot Video Award (Best European Release)
Steve Drake; Johnni Black; Toni James; Monique	Presenters of the awards for Male Performer of the Year and Female Performer of the Year
Paul Fishbein	Presenter of the AVN Special Achievement Awards
Gene Ross	Presenter of the AVN Breakthrough Award
Missy	Presenter of the Best New Starlet Award
Melissa Hill; Kylie Ireland; Tiffany Mynx; Mandi Frost	Presenters of the awards for Best Director—Video and Best Director—Film
Jenna Jameson; Nikki Tyler; Sydnee Steele; Tonisha Mills	Presenters of the awards for Best Actor—Video and Best Actress—Video
Juli Ashton; Julian; Tia Bella; Jill Kelly	Presenters for the awards for Best Actor in a Film and Best Actress in a Film
Steven St. Croix; Dyanna Lauren	Presenters of the awards for Best Gonzo Video and Best Sex Comedy
Alisha Klass; Samantha Stylle; Halli Aston	Presenters of the awards for Best All-Sex Video and Best All-Sex Film
Janine Lindemulder; Felecia; Shane; Ed Powers; Brittany Andrews	Presenters of the awards for Best Shot-on-Video Feature and Best Film

=== Performers ===
Name(s)	Role	Performed
The Stingers	Performer	Musical performance: "Sing, Sing, Sing"
Robert Schimmel	Performer	Standup comedy segment
Serenity and the Dirty Dancers	Performers	Musical number: "History Comes Quickly"
Dyanna Lauren	Performer	Musical number: "Psycho Magnet"
Doctor Dirty (John Valby)	Performer	Musical performance
The Spicy Girls (Lauren Montgomery and Midori)	Performers	Musical number: "Calling All Girls"

== Ceremony information ==
While accepting her Lifetime Achievement Award, Christy Canyon announced her official retirement.

Among the people participating in production of the ceremony, Mark Stone also served as musical director; an opening video entitled "History" was produced by Steve Austin and Serenity was responsible for choreography.

The ceremonies were published on VHS tapes by both VCA Pictures and Playboy Entertainment Group. The Playboy tape includes softcore scenes from the winning movies, while the VCA tape features hardcore scenes of the winners. The awards show was also rebroadcast over the Internet by High Society magazine via cun-tv.com on May 16, 1998.

The 1998 AVN Awards later achieved an unexpected shot of mainstream coverage when David Foster Wallace attended the ceremony as part of his overall exploration of pornography's place (or non-place) in American society as the 20th century was nearing its end. Wallace wrote about the event and some matters connected to in an article entitled "Neither Adult Nor Entertainment" published under a pseudonym in the September 1998 issue of Premiere magazine. The article was later collected in Wallace's 2005 nonfiction collection Consider the Lobster under the title "Big Red Son."

=== Critical reviews ===
Some attendees were critical of the show's length. In a posting to the Rec.Arts.Movies.Erotica Usenet newsgroup, Tim Evanson noted, "The length of the show was again a concern (the number of heterosexual categories is quiet large), and the number of gay industry insiders attending the awards dipped slightly this year."

== In Memoriam ==
AVN publisher Paul Fishbein paid tribute to the passing of adult industry businessman Reuben Sturman during the show.

== See also ==
- AVN Female Performer of the Year Award
- AVN Award for Male Performer of the Year
- AVN Award for Male Foreign Performer of the Year
- List of members of the AVN Hall of Fame

== Bibliography ==
- "Exclusive Coverage CES 1998". Fox Magazine. September 1998. p. 70.
- "On the Scene: AVN Awards Ceremony". Swank's Video World. September 1998. p. 40.
- "CES & AVN Awards". Dick magazine (in Japanese). Japan. April 1998.
