= 14th AVN Awards =

US adult industry award ceremony in 1997

- 1997 AVN Awards Show VHS box cover
- Date: January 11, 1997
- Site: Riviera Hotel & Casino, Winchester, Nevada
- Hosted by: Bobby Slayton; Nici Sterling; Kylie Ireland
- Produced by: Gary Miller
- Directed by: Mark Stone

Highlights
- Best Picture: Bobby Sox (Best Film)
- Most awards: Shock (11)

The 14th AVN Awards ceremony, organized by Adult Video News (AVN), took place January 11, 1997 at Riviera Hotel & Casino, Winchester, Nevada, beginning at 7:45 p.m. PST / 10:45 p.m. EST. During the show, AVN presented AVN Awards (the industry's equivalent of the Academy Awards) in 41 categories honoring the best pornographic films released between Oct. 1, 1995 and Sept. 30, 1996. The ceremony was produced by Gary Miller and directed by Mark Stone. Comedian Bobby Slayton returned as host, with actresses Nici Sterling and Kylie Ireland as co-hosts. At a pre-awards event held the previous evening, 60 more AVN Awards, mostly for technical achievements, were given out by hostess Dyanna Lauren and comedy ventriloquist Otto of Otto & George, however, the pre-awards event was neither televised nor distributed on VHS tapes as was the main evening's ceremony.

Shock won the most awards with 11, however, Bobby Sox, an "off-beat period piece comedy" that received six statuettes, won for best film. Flesh and Blood was next with five awards including best gay feature.

== Winners and nominees ==
The winners were announced during the awards ceremony on January 11, 1997. Missy was the first actress to win both Starlet of the Year and the AVN Female Performer of the Year Award in the same year. Kurt Young, however, was second to win the major gay awards in the same year, taking Gay Video Performer of the Year and Best Newcomer.

=== Major awards ===
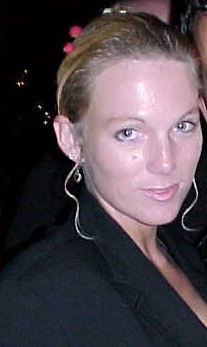
Missy, Female Performer of the Year and Best New Starlet

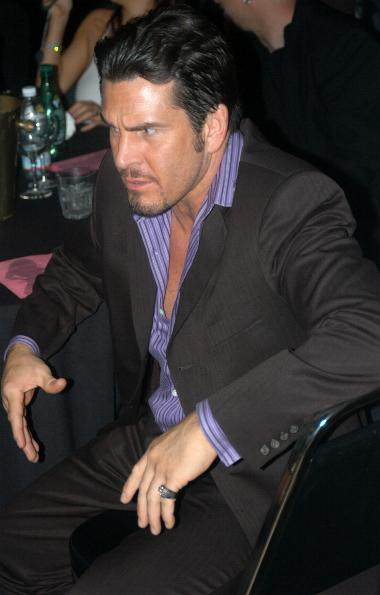
T. T. Boy, Male Performer of the Year winner

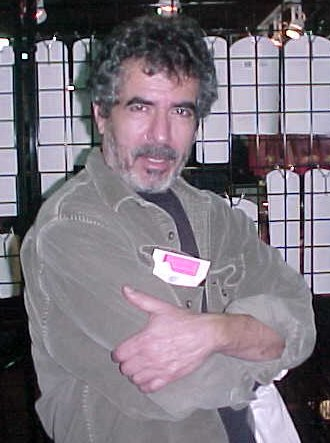
Jamie Gillis, Best Actor—Film winner

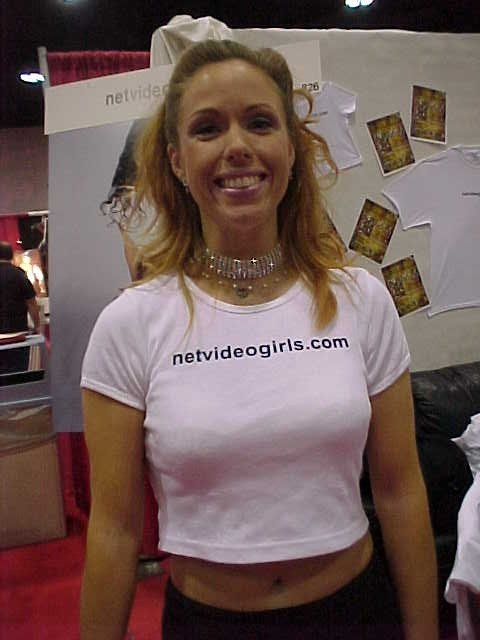
Melissa Hill, Best Actress—Film winner

Winners are listed first, highlighted in boldface, and indicated with a double dagger (‡).

Best Film	Best Shot-on-Video Feature
**Bobby Sox**‡; Dangerous Games; Dreams of Desire; Expose Me Again; Gangland Bangers; Gregory Dark's Sex Freaks; Lust and Desire; Oral Addiction; The Palace of Pleasure; Penetrator 2: Grudge Day; The Show	**Shock**‡; Car Wash Angels; Conquest; Gregory Dark's Flesh; Head Trip; Hollywood Boulevard; Kink 3 Police Chronicles; My Surrender; Pristine; The Pyramid 1 through 3; Silver Screen Confidential; Temple of Poon; Virgin Dreams; XXX
Best New Starlet
**Missy**‡; Farrah; Houston; Kristy Myst; Julie Rage; Ruby; Jasmin St. Claire; Stephanie Swift; Tatiana; Nikki Tyler; Stacy Valentine
Male Performer of the Year	Female Performer of the Year
**T. T. Boy**‡; Tom Byron; Mark Davis; Sean Michaels; Rodney Moore; Jonathan Morgan; Ed Powers; Steven St. Croix; Alex Sanders; Rocco Siffredi; Jake Steed; Max Steiner; Vince Vouyer	**Missy**‡; Juli Ashton; Alex Dane; Jeanna Fine; Melissa Hill; Jenna Jameson; Jill Kelly; Christi Lake; Shayla LaVeaux; Caressa Savage; Nici Sterling; Nikki Tyler
Best Actor—Film	Best Actress—Film
**Jamie Gillis, Bobby Sox**‡; Buck Adams, Sexual Healing; Christoph Clark, Hamlet; Mark Davis, Oral Addiction; Mike Horner, Lust and Desire; Steven St. Croix, Gangland Bangers; Steven St. Croix, The Show; Tony Tedeschi, Party House; Randy West, Expose Me Again	**Melissa Hill, Penetrator 2: Grudge Day**‡; Kaitlyn Ashley, Penetrator 2: Grudge Day; Christy Canyon, Oral Addiction; Christy Canyon, The Show; Melissa Hill, Dangerous Games; Melissa Hill, Dreams of Desire; Nicole London, Lust and Desire; Jenteal, Dangerous Games; Nikki Tyler, Bobby Sox; Stacy Valentine, Expose Me Again
Best Actor—Video	Best Actress—Video
**Jon Dough, Shock**‡; Tom Byron, Gregory Dark's Flesh; Jonathan Morgan, Silver Screen Confidential; Alex Sanders, Stacked Deck; Carter Stone, Whackers; Tony Tedeschi, Heinie's Heroes; Tony Tedeschi, Sue; Vince Vouyer, Hard Evidence; T. T. Boy, NYDP Blue	**Jeanna Fine, My Surrender**‡; Lisa Ann, Entangled; Kaitlyn Ashley, Anal Inquisition; Juli Ashton, Nightshift Nurses 2; Sindee Cox, Pristine; Melissa Hill, Mindset; Kylie Ireland, Twist of Fate; Jenna Jameson, Silver Screen Confidential; Jill Kelly, This Year's Model; Christi Lake, Director's Wet Dreams; Dyanna Lauren, Hard Feelings; Shayla LaVeaux, Head Trip; Tiffany Million, Shock
Best Supporting Actor—Film	Best Supporting Actress—Film
**Tony Tedeschi, The Show**‡; T. T. Boy, Lust and Desire; Jamie Gillis, Goldenrod; Tony Montana, Gangland Bangers; Jonathan Morgan, Penetrator 2: Grudge Day; Alex Sanders, Dangerous Games	**Shanna McCullough, Bobby Sox**‡; Kaitlyn Ashley, Penetrator 2: Grudge Day; Chelsea Blue, Bobby Sox; Jeanna Fine, Dreams; Tracy Love, The Show; Lovette, Gregory Dark's Sex Freaks
Best Supporting Actor—Video	Best Supporting Actress—Video
**Tony Tedeschi, Silver Screen Confidential**‡; Brad Armstrong, Conquest; Steve Hatcher, Stacked Deck; Jonathan Morgan, Anal Inquisition; Jonathan Morgan, Heinie's Heroes; Alex Sanders, Valentina; Joey Silvera, Nightshift Nurses 2; Jake Steed, Valentina	**Juli Ashton, Head Trip**‡; Davia Ardell, Silver Screen Confidential; Juli Ashton, Twist of Fate; Sindee Coxx, XXX; Jenna Jameson, Hard Evidence; Kiss, Sue
Best Director—Film	Best Director—Video
**Paul Thomas, Bobby Sox**‡; Andrew Blake, Unleashed; Stuart Canterbury, Dreams; Nic Cramer, Penetrator 2: Grudge Day; Joe D’Amato, Gangland Bangers; Greg Dark, Gregory Dark's Sex Freaks; Mike Horner, Dreams of Desire; Robert McCallum, Lust and Desire; Ralph Parfait, Oral Addiction; Michael Santangelo, The Palace of Pleasure; Paul Thomas, The Show; Michael Zen, Expose Me Again; T. T. Boy, NYDP Blue; Tom Byron, Gregory Dark's Flesh	**Michael Ninn, Shock**‡; Nic Cramer, Pristine; Gregory Dark, Gregory Dark's Flesh; Alex de Renzy, Virgin Dreams; Teri Diver, Generation Sex; Veronica Hart, The Right Connection; Jim Holliday, Car Wash Angels; Kris Kramski, SexHibition 3; John Leslie, Fresh Meat 3; Candida Royalle, My Surrender; Joey Silvera, Kink 3 Police Chronicles; Greg Steel and Brad Armstrong, Conquest; Justin Sterling, Head Trip; Pierre Woodman, The Pyramid 1–3
Best Sex Comedy	Best All-Sex Video
**The Show**‡; Best Butt in the West 2; Car Wash Angels; Gangbusters; Heinie's Heroes; Nightshift Nurses 2; Silver Screen Confidential	**Fresh Meat 3**‡; Beyond Reality; Dirty Tricks 2; Fresh Meat 2; Friends in Sex; SexHibition 2
Best Selling Tape of the Year	Best Renting Tape of the Year
**Shock**‡; **World's Biggest Gang Bang 2**‡ (tie)	**Shock**‡
Best Gonzo Tape	Best Gonzo Series
**Buttman's Bend Over Babes 4**‡; American Tushy; Anabolic World Sex Tour; Ben Dover's Alley Cats; Ben Dover's Fresh Cheeks	**Butt Row**‡; Anabolic World Sex Tour; Ben Dover; Buttman; Tom Byron's Cumback Pussy
Best Couples Sex Scene—Film	Best Couples Sex Scene—Video
**Jenna Jameson, Rocco Siffredi; Jenna Loves Rocco**‡; Nikki Tyler, Steven St. Croix; Bobby Sox; Jeanna Fine, Vince Vouyer; Dreams; Melissa Hill, Mike Horner; Dreams; Infidel; Lethal Affairs	**Jenna Jameson, Vince Vouyer; Conquest**‡; Ben Dover's Different Strokes; Ben Dover's Little Big Girls; Blue Saloon; Buttman's Bend Over Babes #4; Fresh Meat #2
Best All-Girl Sex Scene—Film	Best All-Girl Sex Scene—Video
**Jill Kelly, Melissa Hill; Dreams of Desire**‡; Lethal Affairs; Lunachick; Nightclub; Party House; Return Engagement; The Show	**Caressa Savage, Missy, Misty Rain; Buttslammers: The Thirteenth**‡; Anal Aristocrats; Buttslammers 12: Anal Madness; Everybody Wants Some; Frendz 2: Friendlier

=== Additional award winners ===
These awards were also announced at the awards show, most in a winners-only segment read by Kylie Ireland during the event:

- Best All-Girl Feature: The Violation of Missy
- Best All-Sex Film: Unleashed
- Best Anal Sex Scene—Film: Lovette and the Six Skeletons (John Decker, Michael J. Cox, Nick East, three others), Gregory Dark's Sex Freaks
- Best Anal Sex Scene—Video: Rocco Siffredi, Laura Turner, Danielle Louise Kelson; Buttman's Bend Over Babes 4
- Best Continuing Video Series: The Voyeur
- Best Director—Gay Video: Jerry Douglas, Flesh and Blood
- Best European Release (the Hot Video Award): Torero (Italy)
- Best Gangbang Tape: Gangbang Girl 17
- Best Gay Video: Flesh and Blood
- Best Group Sex Scene—Film: Christy Canyon, Tony Tedeschi, Vince Vouyer, Steven St. Croix; The Show
- Best Group Sex Scene—Video: (tie) Hakan, Missy, Taren and Alex Sanders, Squirting Anal Orgy scene in American Tushy!; Ruby, Christi Lake, Rocco Siffredi, John Stagliano, Buttman's Bend Over Babes 4
- Best Tease Performance: Janine Lindemulder, Extreme Close-Up
- Gay Video Performer of the Year: Kurt Young
- Most Outrageous Sex Scene: Shayla LaVeaux, T. T. Boy and Vince Vouyer, gargoyle scene in Shock

The previous night, January 10, 1997, during AVN's pre-awards cocktail reception, hostess adult film actress hostess Dyanna Lauren and comedy ventriloquist Otto of Otto & George handed out these awards, mostly for technical excellence:

- Best Advertisement: Changing the Face of Adult, Vivid
- Best Alternative Adult Feature Film: Scoring
- Best Alternative Adult Film Featurette or Specialty Tape: The Best of Anna Nicole Smith
- Best Alternative Adult Video: Buttman at Nudes ‘a Poppin 3
- Best Amateur Series: Filthy First Timers
- Best Amateur Tape: Southern Belles 4
- Best Anal Tape: American Tushy!
- Best Art Direction—Film: Unleashed
- Best Art Direction—Video: Shock
- Best Bisexual Video: Switchhitters VIII
- Best Box Cover Concept: Russian Model Magazine
- Best Box Cover Concept—Gay Video: Night Walk
- Best CD-ROM Graphics/Art Direction: Latex
- Best CD-ROM Photo Disk: Eric Kroll: Fetish
- Best Cinematography: Andrew Blake, Unleashed
- Best Compilation Tape: Sodomania: Smokin' Sextions
- Best Director—Bisexual Video: Gino Colbert, Switchhitters VIII
- Best Editing—Film: Barry Rose, Bobby Sox
- Best Editing—Gay Video: Michael Ninn, Night Walk
- Best Editing—Video: Michael Ninn, Shock
- Best Ethnic-Themed Video: Inner City Black Cheerleader Search 6
- Best Explicit Series: Amazing Hard
- Best Featurette Tape: Sodomania 16
- Best Foreign Release: The Pyramid 1–3
- Best Foreign Featurette Tape: Prague by Night
- Best Gay Alternative Video Release: Nighthawken
- Best Gay Solo Video: Brad Posey's Hot Sessions 3
- Best Gay Specialty Release: Orgy Boys 1 & 2
- Best Interactive CD-ROM (Game): 2069: Oriental Sex Odyssey
- Best Interactive CD-ROM (Non-Game): FantaScenes
- Best Music: Dino and Earl Ninn, Shock
- Best Music—Gay Video: Sharon Kane, Idol in the Sky
- Best Newcomer—Gay Video: Kurt Young
- Best Non-Sex Performance, Film or Video: Scotty Schwartz, Silver Screen Confidential
- Best Non-Sexual Role—Bi, Gay or Trans Video: Jeanna Fine, Flesh and Blood
- Best Original CD-ROM Concept: NetErotique
- Best Overall Marketing Campaign for an Individual Title or Series: Conquest, Wicked Pictures
- Best Overall Marketing Campaign for Company Image: Vivid Girl campaign, Vivid Video
- Best Packaging—Film: Chasey Saves the World
- Best Packaging—Gay Video: Idol in the Sky
- Best Packaging—Specialty: Wheel of Obsession
- Best Packaging—Video: XXX
- Best Performer—Gay Video: Kurt Young, Flesh and Blood
- Best Pro-Am Series: Cumm Brothers
- Best Pro-Am Tape: Up and Cummers 33
- Best Screenplay—Film: Raven Touchstone, Bobby Sox
- Best Screenplay—Gay Video: Jerry Douglas, Flesh and Blood
- Best Screenplay—Video: Jace Rocker, Silver Screen Confidential
- Best Sex Scene—Gay Video: Derek Cameron, Kurt Young, Tradewinds
- Best Special Effects: Shock
- Best Specialty Tape—Big Bust: The Duke of Knockers 2
- Best Specialty Tape—Bondage: Kym Wilde's on the Edge 33
- Best Specialty Tape—Other Genre: High Heeled and Horny 4
- Best Specialty Tape—Spanking: Hot Young Asses
- Best Supporting Performer—Gay Video: Dino Phillips, Happily Ever After
- Best Trailer: Conquest
- Best Trans Video: Red Riding She-Male
- Best Videography: Barry Harley, Shock
- Best Videography—Gay Video: Bruce Cam, Desert Train

=== Honorary AVN Awards ===
==== Special Achievement Awards ====
- Mark Stone and Gary Miller on their 10th anniversary producing the AVN Awards Show
- Berth Milton Jr. and Robert Tremont for their success with Private Video

==== AVN Breakthrough Award ====
Presented to Steve Perry for Ben Dover series

==== Hall of Fame ====
AVN Hall of Fame inductees for 1997, announced during AVN's pre-awards event, were: Bunny Bleu, R. Bolla, Michael Carpenter, Desiree Cousteau, Duck Dumont, Jeanna Fine, Gail Force, Ken Gibb (posthumously), Victoria Paris, Jeannie Pepper, John Stagliano, Joey Stefano (posthumously), John Travis, Dick Witte

=== Multiple nominations and awards ===
Shock won the most awards with 11; Bobby Sox was next with six, followed by gay video Flesh and Blood with five. Buttman's Bend Over Babes 4, Conquest, The Show, Silver Screen Confidential and Unleashed had three apiece. American Tushy! Idol in the Sky, Night Walk and Switchhitters VIII had two each.

== Presenters and performers ==
The following individuals, in order of appearance, presented awards or performed musical numbers or comedy. The show's trophy girls were Midori and Stephanie Swift.

=== Presenters ===
Presenters

Name(s)	Role
Dyanna Lauren; Sasha Vinni; Laura Palmer; Lori Michaels; Gina LaMarca; Bionca; Sahara Sands	Presenters of the awards for Best Couples Sex Scene—Film and Best Couples Sex Scene—Video
Caressa Savage; Angel Hart; Jasmin St. Claire	Presenters of the awards for Best Supporting Actor—Film and Best Supporting Actress—Film
Max Hardcore; Barbie Angel; Shyla Foxxx; Morgan Fairlane	Presenters of the award for Best All-Girl Sex Scene—Video
Misty Rain; Chi Chi LaRue; Richard Williams; Steve Hatcher; Sunset Thomas; Zach Thomas; Missy	Presenters of the award for Best All-Girl Sex Scene—Film
Kristi Myst; Gene Ross; Jill Kelly; Taylor Hayes	Presenters of the AVN Breakthrough Award, Best Renting Tape of the Year and Best Selling Tape of the Year
David Chryso; Lea Martini; Vicka	Presenters of the Hot Video Award (Best European Release)
Tiffany Mynx; Stacy Valentine; Randy West; Tricia Devereaux; Coral Sands; Felicia	Presenters of the awards for Best Supporting Actor—Video and Best Supporting Actress—Video
Robert Schimmel; Rocki Roads; Wet Man	Presenters of the award for Most Outrageous Sex Scene
Victoria Paris; Shane; Yvonne; Rayveness; Felicia	Presenters of the awards for Male Performer of the Year and Female Performer of the Year
Paul Fishbein	Presenter of the AVN Special Achievement Awards
Kylie Ireland	Announces winners in the winners-only segment
Jenna Jameson	Presenter of the award for Best New Starlet
Veronica Hart; Shayla LaVeaux; Carolyn Monroe; Colt Steel; Jon Dough; Jenteal	Presenters of the awards for Best Director—Video and Best Director—Film
Nina Hartley; Mark Davis; Helen Duval; Kobe Tai; Shanna McCullough; Porsche Lynn	Presenters of the awards for Best Actor—Video and Best Actress—Video
Jeanna Fine; Kelly O'Dell; Juli Ashton; Jake Steed; Heather Hunter; T. T. Boy; Janine Lindemulder	Presenters of the awards for Best Actress—Film and Best Actor—Film
Alex Sanders; Nicole London; Brittany O'Neill; Sean Ryder; Shelby Stevens	Presenters of the awards for Best Gonzo Series and Best Gonzo Tape
Wilde Oscar; Micky Lynn; Sindee Cox; Melissa Hill; Jonathan Morgan	Presenters of the awards for Best Sex Comedy and Best All-Sex Video
Monique Covét; Houston; Steven St. Croix; Serenity; Nikki Tyler	Presenters of the awards for Best Shot-on-Video Feature and Best Film

=== Performers ===
Performers

Name(s)	Role	Performed
The Stingers; Serenity and Her Dancers	Performer	Opening number: “The World Sex Suite”
Bobby Slayton	Host	Standup comedy
Rich Williams	Performers	Bill Clinton impersonation
Robert Schimmel	Performer	Standup comedy segment
Scott Schwartz; Serenity and Her Dancers; The Stingers	Performer	Musical number: “Thank Heaven for Grown-Up Girls”
Scott Schwartz; Serenity and Her Dancers; The Stingers	Performer	Macarena spoof: “Cockeranal”

== Ceremony information ==
Comedian Bobby Slayton made a return engagement as host of the show. This year the show was centered around an international theme, “the world of adult,” with added emphasis on European presenters and awards. This was the first year the awards ceremony was split over two nights, with a pre-awards event held January 10, 1997, where awards for technical achievements were distributed, while the main awards were presented January 11, 1997.

Several other people were also involved with the production of the ceremony. Serenity was responsible for choreography and Mark Stone was musical director with original songs by Mark J. Miller.

The top selling and renting tape of the year was Shock, although it was tied in the best-selling category with World's Biggest Gang Bang 2. There were several new awards categories this year including Best Advertisement and the AVN Breakthrough Award to acknowledge "those who were carving new niches and forging new territories in the adult business."

The ceremonies were published on VHS tape by VCA Pictures.

=== Critical response ===
The show received a negative reception from Hustler magazine, which said, “Long-winded speeches from several award winners threatened to bore everyone to death.” It went on to add that since AVN is a trade publication paid for by ads "from the same adult video companies it bestows awards upon, the critical value of such honors is subject to debate." Swank Video World magazine was a bit more positive, calling the show "the most glamorous night in the adult industry."

== See also ==
- AVN Award for Best Actress
- AVN Award for Best Supporting Actress
- AVN Award for Male Performer of the Year
- AVN Award for Male Foreign Performer of the Year
- AVN Award for Female Foreign Performer of the Year
- AVN Female Performer of the Year Award
- List of members of the AVN Hall of Fame

== Bibliography ==
- "Backstage at the Flesh Film Awards". Cheri Magazine. July 1997.
- "Award Winning Pussy!". High Society magazine. July 1997. p. 90.
- "AVN Awards event report". Bachelor magazine (in Japanese). Japan. April 1997.
- "CES & AVN Awards show". Dick magazine (in Japanese). Japan. April 1997.
