= Satyr (film) =

- Directed by: Michael Zen
- Written by: Raven Touchstone
- Starring: Jenna Jameson; Asia Carrera; Missy; Stacy Valentine; Chloe; Mickey G Brad Armstrong; Peter North; Mark Davis; Tom Byron
- Production company: Wicked Pictures
- Release date: 1996
- Running time: 85 minutes
- Country: United States

Satyr is a 1996 pornographic film directed by Michael Zen. It was written by Raven Touchstone and stars Jenna Jameson, Asia Carrera, Missy, Brad Armstrong, and Mickey G.

== Plot ==
Fawn Deering (Jenna Jameson) is a college student researching animal mythology and human sexuality. This project leads her to Dr. Jade (Asia Carrera) for an interview on the subject. While at Dr. Jade's Manor, she meets Adam (Brad Armstrong) and is immediately drawn to him. Sophie the maid (Missy) warns her to leave Jade Manor and never look back, but Fawn cannot resist Adam's invitation to return that weekend to observe a bacchanal. Sophie tries to get Adam to leave Fawn alone and not share their curse, but Adam has fallen in love with her and does not want to live without her. Unfortunately, this means that Fawn will have to become a Satyr like the rest of them. While the transformation takes place, Fawn spends most of her time sleeping and having visions where she sees Adam is his Satyr form. After Fawn is completely transformed, she journeys into Adam's room where they profess their love for each other. Adam finally realizes that he is cursing Fawn for the rest of her lifetime, and sets out to return her to human form.

== Cast ==
- Jenna Jameson as Fawn Deering
- Asia Carrera as Dr. Jade
- Missy as Sophie
- Brad Armstrong as Adam
- Mickey G as Daniel
- Chloe as bacchanal participant
- Stacy Valentine as bacchanal participant
- Mark Davis as bacchanal participant
- Peter North as bacchanal participant
- Tom Byron as bacchanal participant

== Scene breakdowns ==
- Scene 1: Asia Carrera, Mickey G, Brad Armstrong.
- Scene 2: Asia Carrera, Mickey G.
- Scene 3: Jenna Jameson, Missy.
- Scene 4: Chloe, Mark Davis.
- Scene 5: Jenna Jameson, Mickey G, Brad Armstrong.
- Scene 6: Asia Carrera, Missy.
- Scene 7: Stacy Valentine, Peter North, Tom Byron.
- Scene 8: Jenna Jameson, Brad Armstrong.

== Awards and nominations ==
List of accolades received by Satyr
Awards & nominations
Award	Won	Nominated
AVN Awards	1	20
NightMoves Awards	1	0
- Total number of wins and nominations
Totals	2	20
- References

Year	Ceremony	Result	Category	Recipient(s)
1997	NightMoves Award	Won	Best Film/Feature Production	—N/a
1998	AVN Award	Nominated	Best Art Direction - Film	—N/a
1998	AVN Award	Nominated	Best Cinematography	—N/a
1998	AVN Award	Nominated	Best Editing - Film	—N/a
1998	AVN Award	Nominated	Best Supporting Actor - Film	Mickey G.
1998	AVN Award	Nominated	Best Supporting Actress - Film	Asia Carrera
1998	AVN Award	Nominated	Best Supporting Actress - Film	Missy
1998	AVN Award	Nominated	Best Packaging - Film	—N/a
1998	AVN Award	Nominated	Best Overall Marketing Campaign - Individual Project	—N/a
1998	AVN Award	Nominated	Best Advertisement	—N/a
1998	AVN Award	Nominated	Best Couples Sex Scene - Film	Asia Carrera & Mickey G.
1998	AVN Award	Nominated	Best Anal Sex Scene - Film	Chloe & Mark Davis
1998	AVN Award	Nominated	Best Group Sex Scene - Film	Jenna Jameson, Brad Armstrong & Mickey G.
1998	AVN Award	Nominated	Best Group Sex Scene - Film	Stacy Valentine, Tom Byron & Peter North
1998	AVN Award	Won	Best All-Girl Sex Scene - Film	Missy & Jenna Jameson
1998	AVN Award	Nominated	Best All-Girl Sex Scene - Film	Missy & Asia Carrera
1998	AVN Award	Nominated	Top Renting Release of the Year	—N/a
1998	AVN Award	Nominated	Top Selling Release of the Year	—N/a
1998	AVN Award	Nominated	Best Film	—N/a
1998	AVN Award	Nominated	Best Actress - Film	Jenna Jameson
1998	AVN Award	Nominated	Best Director - Film	Michael Zen
1998	AVN Award	Nominated	Best Trailer	—N/a
