= Fugate =

Fugate is a surname. Notable people with the surname include:

- the "Blue Fugates," a Kentucky family with a hereditary blood disorder that caused many family members to have blue skin
- Boyd C. Fugate (1884–1967), American politician
- Caril Ann Fugate (born 1943), American murderer
- Christine Fugate (born 1964), American documentary filmmaker
- Craig Fugate (born 1959), American government official
- Joe Fugate, American writer and game designer
- Katherine Fugate (born 1965), American film and television writer
- Terry Fugate-Wilcox (born 1944), American painter
- Thomas B. Fugate (1899–1980), American businessman
