= Sean Michaels (actor) =

American pornographic actor

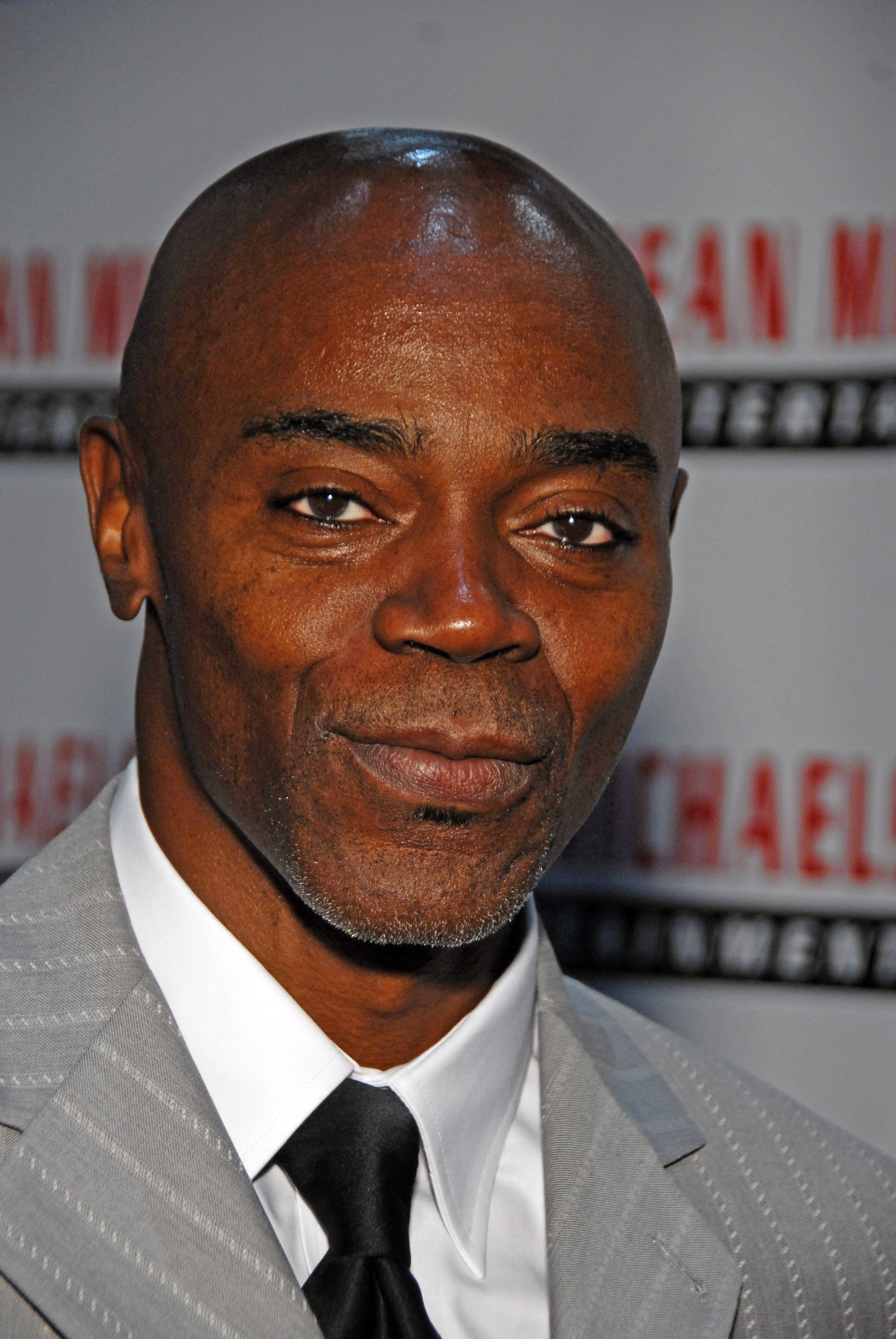
- Michaels in Los Angeles in 2011
- Born: February 20, 1958 (age 67); Brooklyn, New York City, U.S.
- Years active: 1989–present

Sean Michaels (born February 20, 1958) is an American pornographic actor, model, director and former trade union leader. In 2002, AVN ranked him 14th on their list of The Top 50 Porn Stars of All Time. Michaels has won several prominent adult industry awards, including the NightMoves Award for Best Actor. He has also been inducted into the AVN, NightMoves, Urban X, and XRCO Halls of Fame.

== Early life ==
Michaels was born and raised in Brooklyn, New York. He attended Boys and Girls High School, the oldest public high school in Brooklyn. After moving to the West Coast, he worked as a nurse for an urgent care facility in Woodland Hills, Los Angeles. He also did runway and print modeling prior to entering the porn industry.

== Career ==
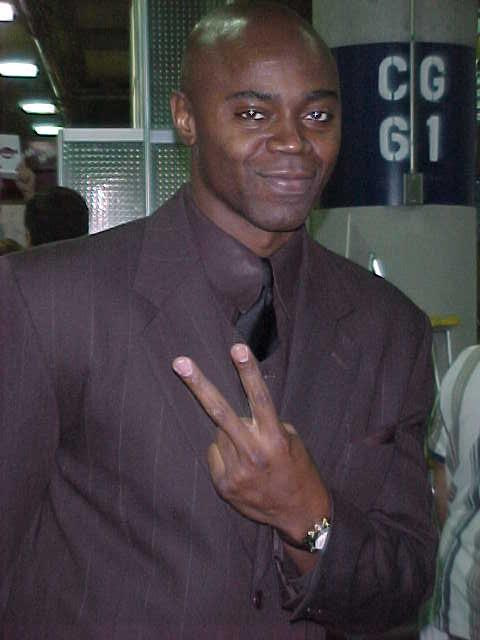
Michaels at the AVN Expo in 2000

Michaels started out working in the adult entertainment industry as a model for skin magazines. Dissatisfied with the portrayal of black men in pornography, which he saw as "very demeaning and stereotypical", Michaels began performing in adult films in 1989. Michaels chose his stage name by combining the first names of two male celebrities he admired: Sean Connery, whom he described as a "man's man, on and off camera", and Michael Jordan.

Michaels gained recognition in the industry after appearing in his mentor John Leslie's 1990 film Oh What A Night. Micheals received the XBIZ Award for Woodsman of the Year in 1994. The following year, he was inducted into the AVN Hall of Fame. In 1996, he started his own film studio, Sean Michaels Productions, which was later changed to Sean Michaels International the following year when Anabolic Video began handling its distribution.

Along with Lisa Ann and Nikki Benz, Michaels hosted the XRCO Awards in April 2010. In 2018, he performed in his first bisexual scene for Kick Ass Pictures. In regards to the scene, Michaels commented, "I feel strongly about doing the things you want to do in life. Cuckold fans have been asking me for years to do bi scenes, and I'm happy to be making this move. I believe it's important for people to grow sexually in any way they choose."

== Legal dispute ==
In 2003, World Wrestling Entertainment (WWE) issued Michaels a cease and desist letter, asking him to stop using his name due to the similarity it had to wrestler Shawn Michaels. Sean Michaels' name was already registered as a trademark, while Shawn Michaels had not registered his moniker. Michaels later announced he planned to countersue the WWE. As of April 1, 2011, the trademark of "Sean Michaels" is no longer active.

== Advocacy and impact ==
In 2016, Michaels was elected President of the Adult Performance Artists Guild, then the Adult Performers Actors Guild (APAG). As President, he announced the APAG would push to raise the legal age to perform in adult films from 18 to 21, commenting that "it's 21 years old to drink, so you should have to be 21 to do porn." Amidst criticism from APAG members who saw him as reducing his union participation, Michaels officially resigned from his role. He was replaced in the role by actress Alana Evans, who had served as vice president under him. Evans revealed that Michaels was being "blackballed" in the pornographic industry due to his guild participation.

In the May 1997 issue of Vibe, he was labeled "the preeminent force in interracial erotic entertainment." In her book A Taste for Brown Sugar: Black Women in Pornography, women's studies scholar Mireille Miller-Young notes how Michaels' portrayal of "suave and professional" characters in his films has challenged the stereotyping of black men as "sexual beasts" in pornography and expanded opportunities for black performers. Violet Blue shares a similar sentiment in The Ultimate Guide to Adult Videos, calling Michaels a "major force in changing the face and attitudes of the adult industry towards black performers." Blue concluded by dubbing him "the most famous black man to ever appear in porn."

== Select appearances ==
Year	Title	Role	Notes	Ref.
1990	Oh, What a Night!	Richard Parker	Breakthrough role	
2004	Thinking XXX	Himself	Documentary	
2012	Dave's Old Porn	Himself	Episode: "Retro Orgy Night"	
2018	Black Bi Cuckolding	Himself	First performance in bisexual pornography	
2018	Hot For Transsexuals 6	Himself	First appearance in transgender pornography	
2022	Sex Before the Internet	Himself	Episode: "Porn Awards"	

== Awards and nominations ==
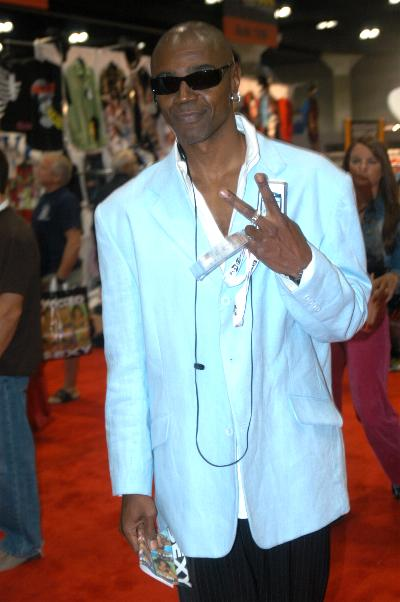
Michaels in 2005

AVN Awards
Year	Nominated work and artist	Category	Result	Ref.
1991	Nasty Girls	Best Video Group Sex Scene	Nominated	
1994	Anus and Andy	Best Sex Scene, Video (Group)	Nominated	
1994	Sean Michaels	Male Performer of the Year	Nominated	
1995	In the Bush	Best Actor—Video	Nominated	
1995	Sean Michaels	Hall of Fame	Won	
1995	Sean Michaels	Male Performer of the Year	Nominated	
1996	Visions	Best Couples Sex Scene—Video	Nominated	
1996	World Sex Tour, Vol. 1	Best Group Sex Scene—Video	Won	
1996	The Passion	Most Outrageous Sex Scene	Nominated	
1997	Sean Michaels	Male Performer of the Year	Nominated	
1998	Butt Banged Naughty Nurses	Best Anal Sex Scene—Video	Won	
1998	Dinner Party 2	Best Couples Sex Scene—Film	Nominated	
1998	Face Jam	Best Supporting Actor—Video	Nominated	
1998	Sean Michaels	Male Performer of the Year	Nominated	
1999	Sean Michaels' Up Your Ass 7	Best Anal Sex Scene—Video	Nominated	
1999	Tushy Heaven	Best Anal Sex Scene—Video	Won	
1999	Fresh Meat 5	Best Group Sex Scene—Video	Nominated	
1999	Tushy Heaven	Best Group Sex Scene—Video	Won	
1999	Sean Michaels	Male Performer of the Year	Nominated	
2000	We Go Deep	Best Couples Sex Scene—Video	Nominated	
2000	Sean Michaels	Male Performer of the Year	Nominated	
2006	Sean Michaels	Male Performer of the Year	Nominated	
2007	Fuck	Best Anal Sex Scene – Film	Nominated	
2007	Elastic Assholes 4	Best Anal Sex Scene – Video	Nominated	
2007	Fuck	Best Group Sex Scene – Film	Nominated	
2007	Janine's Been Blackmaled	Best Group Sex Scene – Film	Nominated	
2007	Racial Tension	Best Sex Scene Coupling – Video	Nominated	
2008	Orgy World: The Next Level 11	Best Group Sex Scene – Video	Nominated	
2009	Succubus of the Rouge	Best Supporting Actor	Nominated	
2010	Semen Sippers 7	Best Threeway Sex Scene	Nominated	
2010	Bobbi Starr & Dana DeArmond's Insatiable Voyage	Best Double Penetration Sex Scene	Won	
2010	LA Pink: A XXX Porn Parody	Best Actor	Nominated	
2010	LA Pink: A XXX Porn Parody	Best Double Penetration Sex Scene	Nominated	
2010	Sean Michaels	Male Performer of the Year	Nominated	
2011	Interracial Fuck Sluts	Best Three-Way Sex Scene (B/B/G)	Nominated	
2012	Orgy: The XXX Championship	Best Group Sex Scene	Nominated	
2013	School of Black Cock	Best Double Penetration Sex Scene	Nominated	
2013	Elastic Assholes 10	Best Three-Way Sex Scene (B/B/G)	Nominated	
2014	Double Black Penetration	Best Double Penetration Sex Scene	Nominated	
2016	True Lust	Best Three-Way Sex Scene - (B/B/G)	Nominated	
2016	Adriana's a Slut	Best Group Sex Scene	Nominated	
2017	This Ain't American Horror Story XXX	Best Supporting Actor	Nominated	
2017	The Booty Queen 2	Best Double Penetration Sex Scene	Nominated	
2018	Anal Warriors 3	Best Anal Sex Scene	Nominated	
2020	Hot for Transexuals 9	Best Transgender Group Sex Scene	Nominated	

F.O.X.E. Awards
Year	Nominated work and artist	Category	Result	Ref.
1996	Sean Michaels	Male Fan Favorite	Won	
1997	Sean Michaels	Male Fan Favorite	Won	
1998	Sean Michaels	Male Fan Favorite	Won	

NightMoves Awards
Year	Nominated work and artist	Category	Result	Ref.
2002	Sean Michaels	Best Actor (Fan's Choice)	Won	
2003	Sean Michaels	Best Director (Fan's Choice)	Won	
2007	Sean Michaels	NightMoves Hall of Fame	Won	

Transgender Erotica Awards
Year	Nominated work and artist	Category	Result	Ref.
2020	Sean Michaels	Best Non-TS Male Performer	Won	
2021	Sean Michaels	Best Non-TS Male Performer	Nominated	

Urban X Awards
Year	Nominated work and artist	Category	Result	Ref.
2008	Sean Michaels	Best Male Performer	Nominated	
2008	Sean Michaels	Urban X Hall of Fame	Won	
2011	Cougar on the Prowl	Best 3 Way Sex Scene	Nominated	
2012	Anal Buffet 7	Best 3-Way Sex Scene	Nominated	
2012	Anal Buffet 7	Best Anal Sex Scene	Nominated	
2012	Black Diamonds	Best Couples Sex Scene	Nominated	
2012	Daddy Knows Best	Best Couples Sex Scene	Nominated	

XBIZ Awards
Year	Nominated work and artist	Category	Result	Ref.
2010	L.A. Pink	Acting Performance of the Year — Male	Nominated	
2010	Sean Michaels	Male Performer of the Year	Nominated	
2014	Diesel Dongs 28	Best Scene — Non-Feature Release	Nominated	
2017	This Ain't American Horror Story XXX	Best Supporting Actor	Nominated	
2018	Anal Warriors 3	Best Sex Scene — Gonzo Release	Nominated	
2018	Sun-Lit	Best Sex Scene — Vignette Release	Nominated	
2019	Carnal	Best Sex Scene — All-Sex Release	Nominated	
2021	The TransAngels Motorcycle Club	Best Sex Scene — Trans	Nominated	

XRCO Awards
Year	Nominated work and artist	Category	Result	Ref.
1994	Arabian Nights	Best Anal Sex Scene	Won	
1994	Slave to Love	Group Sex Scene	Won	
1994	Sean Michaels	Woodsman of the Year	Won	
1999	Tushy Heaven	Best Anal or D.P. Scene	Won	
2000	Sean Michaels	Male Performer of the Year	Nominated	
2000	Sean Michaels	XRCO Hall of Fame	Won	
