= Fans of X-Rated Entertainment =

United States based pornography fan organization

- Date: February 14, 1990
- Country: USA
- Website: http://www.foxe.com

Fans of X-Rated Entertainment (F.O.X.E., also known as FOXE) is a United States-based pornography fan organization founded by adult film actor, director, and critic William Margold and actress Viper. It advocates against censorship of pornography and gives annual adult film awards.

== Awards ==
The annual FOXE awards ceremony presents three standard awards decided by fan vote: Male Fan Favorite, Female Fan Favorite, and Video Vixen for a new female performer. Additional special awards, including Fan of the Year are presented in some years. In the 1990s, the Fan Favorite awards were often shared but Vixen was always for one recipient. Since the 11th FOXE awards, the ceremony has included a "Broast" (a "benign roast") of a well-known performer who also receives a lifetime achievement award. Any performer winning Fan Favorite three times is "retired" with the FOXE X award, and they become ineligible for further awards. Holders of the FOXE X include Tera Patrick, Nina Hartley, Ashlyn Gere, and Jill Kelly. Ceremony attendance fees go to support anti-censorship causes, like the Protecting Adult Welfare Foundation. The FOXE award winners are decided by a vote from members of FOXE.

== 1990 ==
The first awards were presented on February 14, 1990, at the XRCO Awards ceremony:

- Female Fan Favorite: Nina Hartley
- Male Fan Favorite: Peter North

== 1991 ==
- Vixen: Selena Steele
- Female Fan Favorite: Christy Canyon, Nina Hartley & Tori Welles
- Male Fan Favorite: Tom Byron & Peter North

== 1992 ==
- Starlet of the Year (Vixen): Teri Weigel
- Female Fan Favorite: Christy Canyon, Ashlyn Gere & Nina Hartley
- Male Fan Favorite: Tom Byron & Peter North

== 1993 ==
- Video Vixen: Alex Jordan
- Female Fan Favorite: Ashlyn Gere, Hyapatia Lee & Madison
- Male Fan Favorite: Rocco Siffredi & Randy Spears

== 1994 ==
- Male Fan Favorite: Randy West & Rocco Siffredi
- Female Fan Favorite: Nikki Dial, Ashlyn Gere & Tiffany Mynx
- Vixen: Danyel Cheeks

== 1995 ==
- Male Fan Favorite: Randy West & Rocco Siffredi
- Vixen: Kylie Ireland
- Female Fan Favorite: Debi Diamond & Leena

== 1996 ==
- Video Vixen: Jenna Jameson
- Male Fan Favorite: Randy West & Sean Michaels
- Female Fan Favorite: Kylie Ireland, Alicia Rio & Shane

== 1997 ==
- Male Fan Favorite: T. T. Boy & Sean Michaels
- Female Fan Favorite: Jeanna Fine, Jenna Jameson & Shane
- Vixen: Stephanie Swift

== 1998 ==
Held at the Mayan Theater in Los Angeles:

- Male Fan Favorite: Sean Michaels & T. T. Boy
- Female Fan Favorite: Jenna Jameson, Stacy Valentine, Tiffany Mynx & Stephanie Swift

Special awards were the "Lady Liberty" award for free speech activist Mara Epstein, the "Friend of F.O.X.E." award for Kitty Foxx, and the "Fan of the Year" for Jay Holnar

== 1999 ==
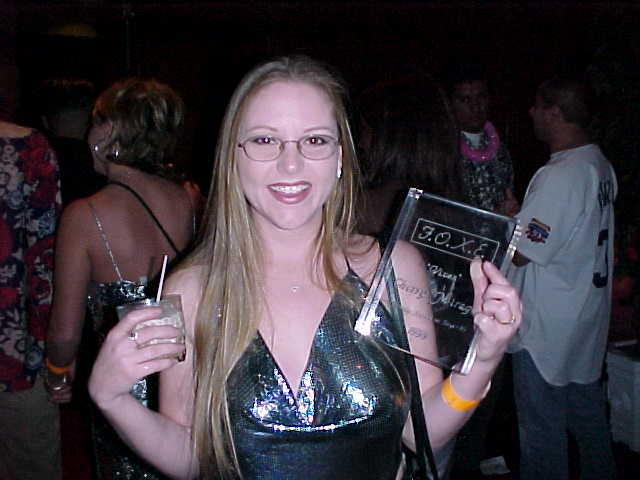
Cherry Mirage holding her F.O.X.E. Vixen Award, October 1999

- Male Fan Favorite: T. T. Boy & Tom Byron
- Female Fan Favorite: Alisha Klass, Christi Lake & Stacy Valentine
- Vixen: Cherry Mirage

== 2001 ==
Held on July 8, 2001, at the Mayan Theater with the Mistress of Ceremonies being Christi Lake:

- Male Fan Favorites: Mr. Marcus & Randy Spears
- Female Fan Favorites: Kim Chambers, Bridgette Kerkove & Jill Kelly
- Vixen: Tera Patrick

== 2002 ==
Date: June 9, 2002
Location: Mayan Theater
Host: Christi Lake
Broast subject: Ron Jeremy

=== Winners ===
Male Fan Favorites: Mr. Marcus & Evan Stone
Female Fan Favorites: Tera Patrick, Jill Kelly, & Christi Lake
Vixen: Monica Mayhem
Friend of FOXE: Ron Jeremy

== 2003 ==
Date: June 21, 2003
Location: Mayflower Ballroom
Host: Bill Margold
Emcee: Christi Lake
Broast subject: Amber Lynn

=== Winners ===
Male Performer of the Year: Lexington Steele
Female Performer of the Year: Belladonna & Jill Kelly
Vixen of the Year: Taylor Rain

== 2004 ==
The 13th awards presentation was held June 17, 2004, in Inglewood, California. Seka was the guest of honor, and Broast subject. Teri Weigel was Mistress of Ceremonies. Tera Patrick won Female Fan Favorite, Mary Carey won the FOXE Vixen award, and Lexington Steele won Male Fan Favorite.

== 2005 ==
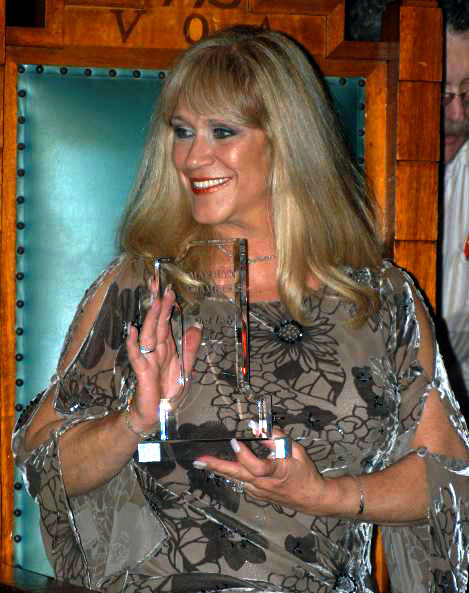
Marilyn Chambers at the 2005 FOXE Awards, February 2005

The 14th F.O.X.E. Awards were held on Sunday, February 20, 2005, at the Mayflower Ballroom in Inglewood, California:

- Video Vixen: Teagan Presley
- Male Fan Favorite: Lexington Steele
- Female Fan Favorite: Tera Patrick

Marilyn Chambers was the Broast subject and received a lifetime achievement award.

== 2006 ==
The 15th award ceremonies were held on Sunday, February 19, 2006:

- Male Fan Favorite: Randy Spears
- Female Fan Favorite: Jesse Jane
- Vixen: Sunny Lane

Randy Spears, Lexington Steele, and Tera Patrick were all formally "retired", after winning three previous FOXE awards. Christy Canyon was the Broast subject.
