= Serenity (actress) =

American pornographic actress (born 1969)

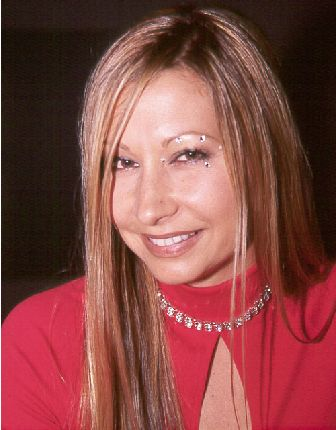
- Serenity at the 2001 AVN Adult Entertainment Expo
- Born: Sonya Elizabeth Lane; October 29, 1969 (age 57); Fort Leonard Wood, Missouri, U.S.
- Other name: Serenity Wilde
- Occupation: Pornographic actress
- Height: 5 ft 4 in (1.63 m)

Serenity (born October 29, 1969) is an American former pornographic actress who worked with Wicked Pictures and Hollywood Video. In 2002, she was ranked one of "The Top 50 Porn Stars of All Time" by Adult Video News. She also worked as a reporter for various news channels and is an outspoken advocate for animal rights.

== Early life ==
Serenity was born in Fort Leonard Wood, Missouri, and raised "everywhere from Maine to Mississippi". As a young adult, she moved to Las Vegas in the early 1990s. She holds a degree in journalism. She was a ballet dancer and waitress prior to entering the adult entertainment industry.

== Career ==
Serenity started out stripping and modeling for men's magazines. Her first scene was with Alexis DeVell and PJ Sparxx in Jennifer Ate for Wicked Pictures in 1993. Her first boy/girl scene was in The Temptation of Serenity. She was a contract performer for Wicked Pictures between 1996 and December 31, 2001. In September 2002, she signed a one-year, multi-picture deal with Hollywood Video. She announced her retirement on September 22, 2004. With the exception of her first boy-girl scene, she always shot with condoms. AVN ranked her 36th on their list of "The Top 50 Porn Stars of All Time". She was also the first performer to win back-to-back AVN Awards for Best Actress - Video.

== Mainstream media appearances ==
Serenity worked as a correspondent on E! during her porn career. She appeared in over twenty specials for Wild On!. In 1999, she appeared alongside Julia Ann in a skit for The Man Show. That same year, she appeared on Good Day L.A. reporting from Erotica LA. alongside Stephanie Swift. She made another appearance on the show shortly after. In 2000, she made appearances in Action and Frank Chindamo's The Dalai Camel. The Dalai Camel is part of an anthology titled Love Bytes.

== Other ventures ==
In June 1999, Serenity launched Las Vegas Novelties, a sex toy manufacturer. She co-founded it with Mark Goodman. In 2001, she purchased Goodman's half of the company and became its sole proprietor. Las Vegas Novelties was acquired by Pipedream Products in March 2005.

In November 2002, Serenity, Peter Chan, and Steve Lane launched C & L Wholesalers, a Canberra, Australia-based company that sold adult products such as condoms, personal lubricants, and sex toys.

In May 2000, Serenity began reviewing pornographic films for Adult DVD Empire. She was also the publisher, as well as a columnist, for Showgirls magazine.

== Advocacy ==
Serenity is a strong supporter of PETA. She has done fundraising auctions for PETA as well as radio and television interviews on their behalf. A photo of her wearing fake snakeskin chaps and a pleather corset was featured in PETA's Shopping Guide to Nonleather Products, which was released in October 2001. She's been an outspoken proponent of vegetarianism and received a nomination by PETA for Sexiest Vegetarian in 2003, five years after she became a vegetarian.

== Personal life ==
Serenity is bisexual. In 2003 the Sydney Morning Herald newspaper said, "Serenity, a feminist adult industry company executive, has become an unwilling poster girl for the gender power shift in an industry historically associated with exploitation." She married her business partner, Steve Lane. In September 2004, she was in her third trimester of pregnancy with their first child.

== Awards and nominations ==
List of accolades received by Serenity
Awards & nominations
Award	Won	Nominated
AVN Awards	3	15
NightMoves Awards	3	4
XRCO Awards	1	5
- Total number of wins and nominations
Totals	7	24

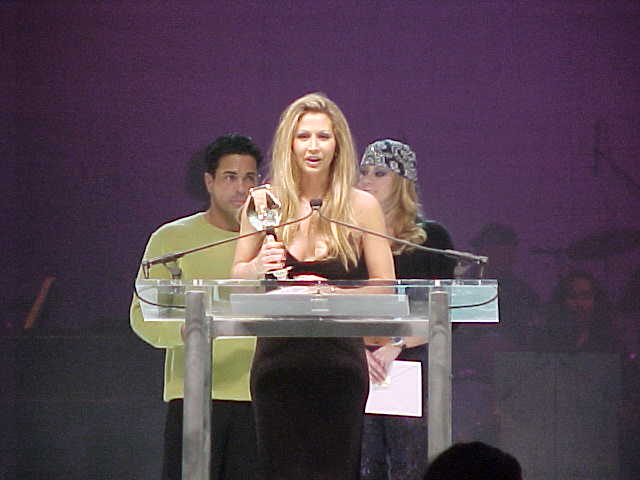
Serenity accepting her AVN Award for Best Actress, Video on January 8, 2000

AVN Awards
Year	Result	Award	Film
1997	Nominated	Best Couples Sex Scene (with Colt Steele)	Time Machine
1998	Nominated	Best All Girl Sex Scene (with Missy)	Crazed
1998	Nominated	Best Actress	Crazed
1998	Nominated	Best Couples Sex Scene (with Alex Sanders)	Lost Angels
1998	Nominated	Best Group Sex Scene (with Sindee Coxx & Alex Sanders)	Lost Angels
1998	Nominated	Female Performer of the Year	—N/a
1999	Nominated	Best Actress	Date From Hell
1999	Nominated	Best All-Girl Sex Scene (with Ruby)	Wicked Covergirls
1999	Nominated	Female Performer of the Year	—N/a
2000	Won	Best Actress, Video	Double Feature!
2000	Nominated	Female Performer of the Year	—N/a
2001	Nominated	Female Performer of the Year	—N/a
2001	Won	Best Actress - Video	M Caught in the Act
2001	Nominated	Best Group Sex Scene - Video (with Brittany Andrews & Kyle Stone)	Wickedgirl.com
2002	Nominated	Female Performer of the Year	—N/a
2002	Nominated	Best Actress - Video	XXX Training
2002	Nominated	Best Couples Sex Scene - Video (with Ian Daniels)	Jack & Jill
2005	Won	AVN Hall of Fame	—N/a

NightMoves Awards
Year	Result	Award
1997	Nominated	Best New Starlet
1998	Won	Best Actress (Fan's Choice)
1999	Nominated	Best Actress
2000	Won	Best Actress (Fan's Choice)
2001	Nominated	Best Actress
2002	Nominated	Best Actress
2007	Won	NightMoves Hall of Fame

XRCO Awards
Year	Result	Award	Film
1998	Nominated	Female Performer of the Year	—N/a
2000	Nominated	Female Performer of the Year	—N/a
2001	Nominated	Female Performer of the Year	—N/a
2001	Nominated	Single Performance, Actress	M Caught In The Act
2002	Nominated	Single Performance, Actress	XXX Training
2007	Won	XRCO Hall of Fame	—N/a
