= Tiffany Mynx =

American actress

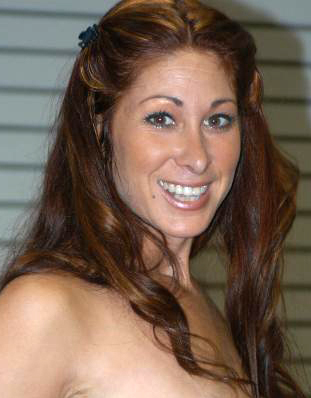
- Mynx in 2005
- Other names: Tiffany Minx; Angelica; Shannon
- Occupations: Pornographic actress; film director
- Height: 5 ft 3.5 in (1.61 m)
- Children: 3

Tiffany Mynx is an American former pornographic actress and film director. She is a member of the AVN and XRCO Halls of Fame.

== Adult film career ==
Mynx has starred in more than 400 porn movies and has directed The Toe Story. She was inducted into the AVN Hall of Fame in 2001, and the XRCO Hall of Fame in 2003.

== Awards ==
- 1993 AVN Award – Best Couples Sex Scene - Film – Face Dance 1 (with Angel Ash, Chrissy Ann, Sheila Stone, Sierra, Rick Smears, Rocco Siffredi, Tom Byron, & Woody Long)
- 1993 XRCO Award – Best Group Scene – Face Dance 1 (with Angel Ash, Chrissy Ann, Sheila Stone, Sierra, Rick Smears, Rocco Siffredi, Tom Byron, & Woody Long)
- 1994 AVN Award – Best Anal Sex Scene - Video – Sodomania 5: Euro/American Style (with Kitty Yung & Randy West)
- 1994 F.O.X.E. Award – Female Fan Favorite (shared with Ashlyn Gere & Nikki Dial)
- 1998 F.O.X.E. Award – Female Fan Favorite (shared with Jenna Jameson, Stacy Valentine, & Stephanie Swift)
- 1998 XRCO Award – Best Girl-Girl Scene – Miscreants (with Jeanna Fine & Stephanie Swift)
- 1999 XRCO Award – Best Group Scene – Asswoman in Wonderland (with Iroc, Stryc-9, Luciano, & Van Damage)
- 2001 AVN Hall of Fame inductee
- 2003 XRCO Hall of Fame inductee
- 2006 Legends of Erotica Hall of Fame inductee
- 2007 AVN Award – Best Sex Scene Coupling - Video – Slave Dolls 2 (with Manuel Ferrara)
