= Jane Waters =

- Died: October 1, 2011

John Keeler was an editor, cinematographer and director of pornographic films who used the stage name of Jane Waters.

Keeler got his start in the adult movie business by working as a film editor on the film New Wave Hookers. He chose his stage name as a gesture towards cult director John Waters. Waters had more than 50 directing credits, including Traci's Big Trick in 1987 and Barely Legal 51 & 52 in 2005. He was considered one of the best cinematographers in adult film history. Waters was inducted into the AVN Hall of Fame in 1998.

Keeler died on October 1, 2011, of a heart attack, at the age of 68.
