= Christine Fugate =

American journalist (born 1964)

- Born: Los Angeles, California
- Occupations: Filmmaker, director, writer, professor
- Writing career
- Genres: Documentary Films, Independent films, interviews, journalism, television
- Notable works: Tobacco Blues (1998), Grief Becomes Me (2006)
- Notable awards: Showbiz Data's Top 100 Directors
- Website: christinefugate.com

Christine Fugate is an American film producer and director who has filmed across the globe, making projects in Thailand, Malawi, Australia and Great Britain.

Fugate is known for her documentaries and independent films. She is also a journalist, interviewer, and author of Mothering Heights, a column which was published in the Laguna Beach Independent. In 2008, she edited a collection of essays by women sharing diverse perspectives on the same subject, The Mothering Heights Manual for Motherhood, Volume I. She also writes short stories which have appeared in several short story collections including in "Beach Reads: Adrift" and "Beach Reads: Paradise".

== Life ==
Fugate was born in Los Angeles and raised in Lexington, Kentucky. She completed her undergraduate education at Tulane University where she studied history, and went on to earn a Master of Arts in Asian film and theater at the University of Hawaiʻi. She studied the Thai language and researched her thesis, The Power to Choose: Women in Thai Film, 1975–1990, while interning in the Thai film industry. After completing her master's degree, she moved to Thailand where she co-directed her first narrative feature film "สาวขี้อาย" ("Shy Girl").

She returned to Los Angeles in the 1990s to continue her work as a filmmaker.

== Career ==
Fugate began her Hollywood career in 1990 as French director Barbet Schroeder's assistant for the film Single White Female. Subsequently, she worked as Creative Vice President for Pacific Rim Productions where she was an Associate Producer on the HBO film Natural Causes in 1994.

In the late 1990s, Fugate produced and directed a series of independent films, including The Southern Sex (1992), Mother Love (1996), Tobacco Blues (1998) and The Girl Next Door (1999).

Tobacco Blues was screened on board Air Force One for President Bill Clinton. In 2023, the film was added to the American Archive of Public Broadcasting.

Fugate's feature-length documentary The Girl Next Door (1999) about "Oklahoma native Stacy Valentine's rise to stardom in the adult film industry", had a successful theatrical run in over 25 cities throughout the US and Canada" and landed Fugate on ShowBizData's list of Top Directors.

Fugate went on the road with rock band KISS, directing an episode of VH1's FanClub about them (2000). She also directed the pilot for the Discovery series, Reconcilable Differences (2003).

In 2005, she rendered the poetry of writer Donna Hilbert for the screen in Grief Becomes Me (2005), which premiered at the Kentucky Women Writers Conference and at the Los Angeles International Short Film Festival. Fugate went on to create a biopic connecting Hilbert's life and work, titled Grief Becomes Me: A Love Story (2009).

Fugate produced, wrote and directed Queen Moorea (2022), a documentary that follows six years in the life of Laguna Beach High School homecoming queen Moorea Howson and her life with Williams Syndrome. The cinéma vérité film "shares an intimate look into the gifts and struggles of growing up with a disability in America." Queen Moorea premiered at the Coast Film Festival and screened at the Slamdance Film Festival. The film also had an international festival run, screening at the Courage Film Festival in Berlin, the Twelve Lions Festival, the Spain International Film Festival and the Anchorage International Film Festival, among others.

Fugate is an assistant professor of film at Chapman University's Dodge College of Film & Media Arts. She is fluent in Italian and was recently invited to be a fellow of the Ferucci Institute (2024).

She lives in Orange County, California, and has two children. She maintains a low public profile.

== Filmography ==
- The Southern Sex (1992)
- Mother Love (1996)
- Tobacco Blues (1998)
- The Girl Next Door (1999)
- Grief Becomes Me (Short Film) (2006)
- Grief Becomes Me: A Love Story (2009)
- Queen Moorea (2022)
