= Nic Cramer =

Swedish pornographic film director (born 1965)

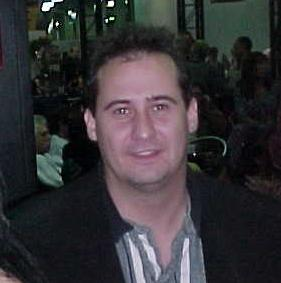
- Nic Cramer in 2000
- Born: December 28, 1965 (age 60); Sankt Görans församling, Stockholm, Sweden
- Other names: Nick Cream, Nick Cramer

Nic Cramer (born December 28, 1965) is a Swedish pornographic film director. He has directed over 120 adult movies since 1992. Cramer stated in 2012 that he intended to return to Los Angeles and the adult industry, after a six-year hiatus in his native Sweden.

== Awards ==
- 1998 AVN Award – Best Director, Film (Operation Sex Siege)
- 1999 AVN Award – Best Director, Film (Looker)
- 1999 AVN Award – Best Editing, Film (Looker)
- 1999 AVN Award – Best Screenplay, Film (Looker)
