= Peter North (actor) =

Canadian pornographic actor

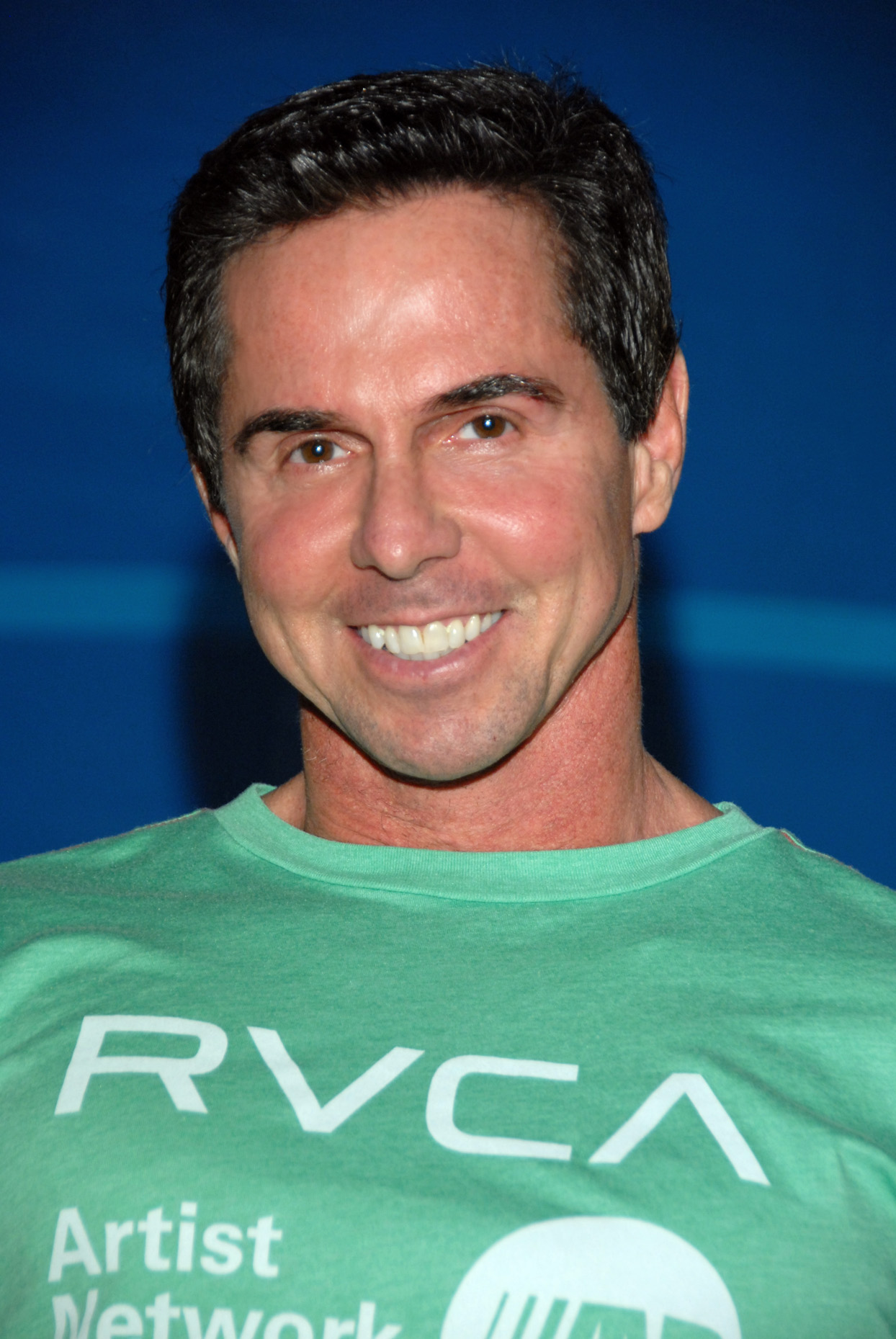
- North at the Exxxotica Expo Adult Entertainment Expo, 2010
- Born: Alden Joseph Brown; May 11, 1957 (age 69); Halifax, Nova Scotia, Canada
- Height: 183 cm (6 ft 0 in)
- Spouse: Nadia North (m. 2014; div. 2019)
- Website: peternorth.com

Alden Joseph Brown (born May 11, 1957), known professionally as Peter North, is a Canadian retired pornographic actor, director and producer. He has 2,189 credits as an actor and 78 as a director.

== Career ==
North was born in Halifax, Nova Scotia, the son of Eric Austin Brown and Gisele Marie Robichaud. North has two sisters, one older and one younger.

North began his adult film career in 1983. Initially, North performed in gay pornography, as both a top and bottom, under the name Matt Ramsey. Working with Jim South from World Modeling, North soon after transitioned to straight pornography.

North has appeared in over 2,000 adult films and also directed more than 70 films (notably, his North Pole and Anal Addicts series), most of them between 1998 and 2007. He has also produced over 20 films, including 15 in the North Pole series. In 2001, he launched his own production company, Northpole Entertainment. In the 2026 Peter documentary, North said that he had sold the company.

His stage name is a combination of factors: "Peter" is a slang term for penis; and as North states in the Peter documentary: "When your peter's erect, it's going north. And I'm from Canada, from up north. Peter North sounded like a real name also. It wasn't too hokey."

North became involved in the U.S. government's 1986 investigation of Traci Lords's underage involvement in the industry. Lords was underage when she made most of her movies, including several sex scenes with North. The government eventually dropped the investigation. In a 1996 interview in Details magazine, North commented on his involvement in the scandal by saying: "Traci Lords didn't do much for me. She reeked sex, looked good and young. But I didn't know that she was that young. When the scandal broke, I thought it was a lot of baloney on her part. She knew what she was doing and she deceived a lot of people. She was sexually aggressive off camera to many people, so the whole 'innocence corrupted' scenario she came up with was a total farce."

In 1994, North published a guide to meeting and bedding beautiful women entitled Penetrating Insights.

North is a member of the X-Rated Critics Organization (XRCO) and the Adult Video News (AVN) Hall of Fame.

In 2004, North was featured in a book and film project, Thinking XXX, by photographer Timothy Greenfield-Sanders.

In 2011, North had a cameo appearance in the music video to the Hollywood Undead song "Been to Hell."

=== Peter ===
On January 22, 2026, a documentary about Peter North's life and career premiered at the AVN Awards in Las Vegas. Entitled simply Peter, the film, written and produced by Jeremy Wagner, began appearing on streaming platforms later the same year and features interviews with North himself as well as other adult film stars, such as Ginger Lynn, Christy Canyon, Jenna Jameson and Jewel De'Nyle.

In Peter, North discusses how financial debts tied to organized crime initially marked his beginning in the adult film industry.

He also revealed that his father was an alcoholic and that in 2005 he had voluntarily checked himself into Promises in L. A. due to his use of Xanax and Valium to help him sleep.

== Personal life ==
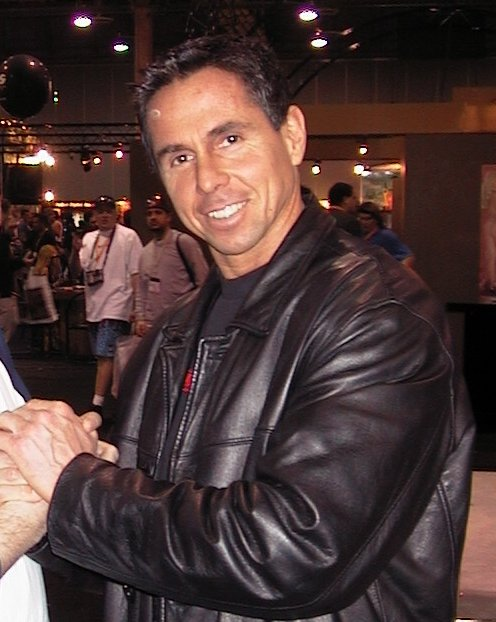
North in 2008

North is of European-Canadian heritage.

North dated adult fim star Candie Evans and later Jewel De'Nyle (from 1998 to 2000), with whom he also lived.

Peter and Nadia North married in the summer of 2014; the couple have performed together in several adult videos.

On July 15, 2019, TMZ reported that Nadia North was granted a restraining order against her husband following two episodes of domestic violence in June of that year. One of the incidents reportedly left her with a concussion, and she alleges that there were about 20 such violent encounters with North.

In an August 2026 interview with J. Curtis Strickland on The T&F Podcast, Peter North denied allegations of abuse and claims that he himself had also taken out a restraining order against Nadia.

The Peter documentary claims that Peter North was arrested two times in ten days but the D.A. never filed any formal charges against him. Former girlfriend Jewel De'Nyle also came to his defense by saying: "I spent a long time with this guy through like the worst patch....The one thing I can say about him is that he would never lay a hand on a woman."

=== Kenny Gallo incident ===
In his memoir, Breakshot: A Life in the 21st Century American Mafia (2009), Kenny Gallo recounts an altercation with North, which arose from North having starred as a bottom in homosexual pornographic films. Gallo stated that North was very sensitive about that particular period of his life and wished to keep it secret. Gallo stated he had received threatening phone calls from North in which North stated that Gallo "would pay" if he spread the information further. Gallo then set up a meeting with North in person to discuss the matter further. Gallo brought some back-up in the form of a "tattooed Nazi drug dealer" named "Speedy." Gallo and Speedy met up with North and threatened North with grievous bodily harm to his face and genitals. Gallo claims that, in the heat of the moment, he reached in his pocket for a knife but was stopped by Speedy before using it.

== Awards ==
- 1990: F.O.X.E. Male Fan Favorite
- 1991: F.O.X.E. Male Fan Favorite
- 1992: F.O.X.E. Male Fan Favorite
- 1998: AVN Best Group Scene – Video for Gluteus to the Maximus

== See also ==
- List of actors in gay pornographic films
- Gay-for-pay
