= Shanna McCullough =

American pornographic film actress

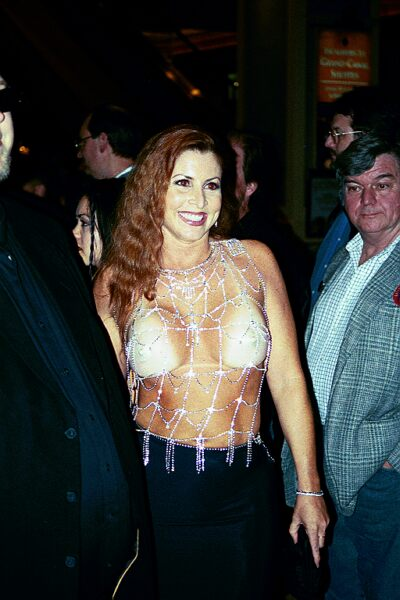
- McCullough in 2001
- Born: 1960 (age 65–66)
- Occupation: Pornographic film actress

Shanna McCullough (born 1960) is an American pornographic film actress.

== Career ==
McCullough chose the stage name Shanna after the heroine from her favorite romance novel by Kathleen E. Woodiwiss, and McCullough because of her Irish ancestry.

In 1999, Wired reported that McCullough was operating a website called ShannaCam giving members 24-hour access to multiple webcams installed in her home. She began retiring from the adult film industry in the early 2000s. Pornographic film actor Dave Cummings has said McCullough was one of the actresses he most enjoyed working with.

== Personal life ==
In 2008 and 2010, McCullough walked the Los Angeles Marathon.

== Awards ==
- 1988 AVN Award – Best Actress—Video (Hands Off)
- 1997 AVN Award – Best Supporting Actress—Film (Bobby Sox)
- 1999 AVN Award – Best Actress—Film (Looker)
- 2000 AVN Award – Best Supporting Actress—Video (Double Feature)
- AVN Hall of Fame
- XRCO Hall of Fame
- Lifetime Achievement Award – Free Speech Coalition, July 2000
