= Caressa Savage =

American pornographic actress (born 1966)

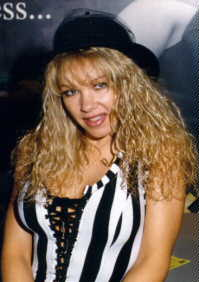
- Savage in 2006
- Born: July 14, 1966 (age 60); Fort Lauderdale, Florida, U.S.
- Other names: Caressa; Carresa Savage; Chrissa; Caressa Stone; Carissa Savage; Carressa Savage
- Occupations: Pornographic actress; nude model
- Height: 5 ft 8 in (1.73 m)

Caressa Savage (born July 14, 1966) is a former American pornographic actress and nude model who appeared in over 170 adult films between around 1995 and 2005.

Over her roughly ten-year career, Savage appeared in 174 productions by companies such as Evil Angel, Legend Video, Leisure time Entertainment, Sin City, VCA Pictures, Vivid Entertainment, and Wicked Pictures predominantly in lesbian and girl/girl scenes.

Savage was featured in the book Top Porn Stars Sex Tips and Tricks, where she stated that she had only worked with women in the adult film industry. Straight Whiskey: A Living History of Sex, Drugs, and Rock and Roll features Savage and fellow porn star Ron Jeremy. In this book, they recount their experiences at the Whisky a Go Go and the Rainbow Bar and Grill.

== Awards ==
- 1997 AVN Award winner – Best All-Girl Sex Scene, Video (Buttslammers the 13th) with Missy & Misty Rain
- 1999 AVN Award winner - Best All-Girl Sex Scene, Video (Buttslammers 16) with Roxanne Hall & Charlie
