= Brittany Andrews =

American pornographic film actress

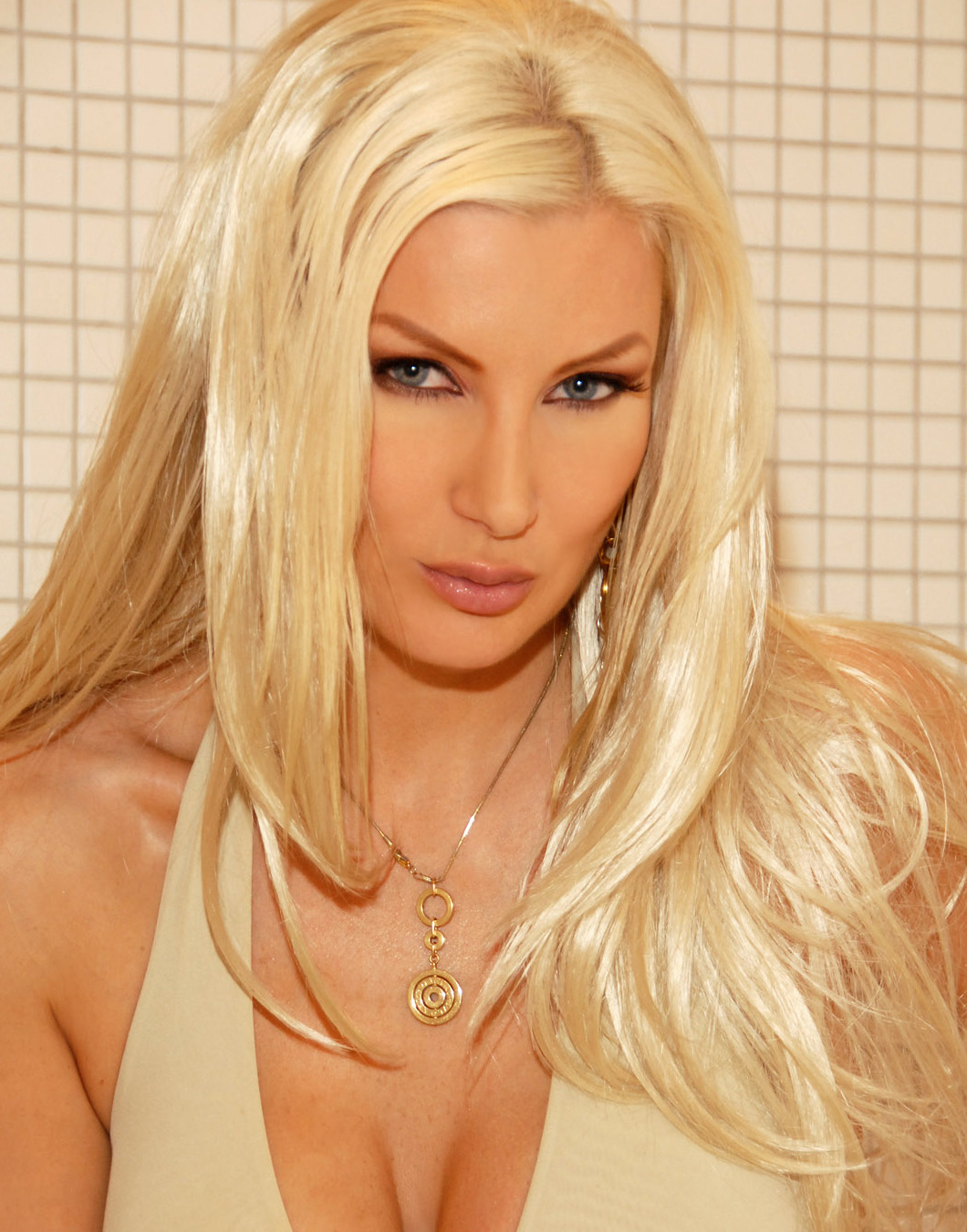
- Andrews in 2010
- Occupations: Exotic dancer; pornographic film actress; film producer; club DJ
- Website: brittanyandrews.com

Brittany Andrews is an American exotic dancer, pornographic film actress, film producer and club DJ. She was inducted into the AVN Hall of Fame in 2008, the XRCO Hall of Fame in 2025, and the Urban X Hall of Fame in 2026.

== Career ==
Andrews worked in a Milwaukee beauty supply company before starting her career as an exotic dancer. After doing photo shoots for men's magazines, she began her career in adult films after meeting Jenna Jameson in 1995, during a photo shoot for Hustler magazine in Jamaica. Andrews retired from porn in 2008. She returned to the business in 2010 to star in the adult film Sex and the City: A XXX Parody.

=== Advocacy ===
In December 2003, Andrews was appointed to the Women in Adult (WIA) board of directors as the Talent Liaison. She has promoted using a condom for hardcore sex scenes. Andrews has said that she is very politically active in the adult business and that her least enjoyable aspect of the business is standing by and watching the exploitation of women being coerced into performing without condoms.

=== Other ventures ===
Andrews has hosted programs on Playboy TV, including as co-producer on Talking Blue. She started her own mainstream film production company Discipline Filmworks in March 2008. In 2010, she produced and appeared in the short film Crumble. The film had its world premiere at the 2010 New York International Independent Film and Video Festival, where it won a number of awards including Audience Award for Short Film, Best Actor in a Short Film (for Steven Bauer) and Best Actress in a Short Film (Oksana Lada). She has also acted as executive producer for the film Trick of the Witch.

== Awards ==
- 2008 AVN Hall of Fame
- 2022 AVN Award – Favorite Domme (Fan Award)
- 2023 AVN Award – Favorite Domme (Fan Award)
- 2025 AVN Award – Favorite Domme (Fan Award)
- 2025 XRCO Hall of Fame
- 2025 ASN Lifetime Achievement Award
- 2026 XMA Award – Fav MILF Star (Fan Favs)
- 2026 AVN Award – Niche/Specialty Performer of the Year
- 2026 Urban X Hall of Fame
- 2026 Urban X Award – Best MILF Performer
- 2026 FapHouse Award – MILF Creator of the Year
