= Nikki Tyler =

American pornographic film actress

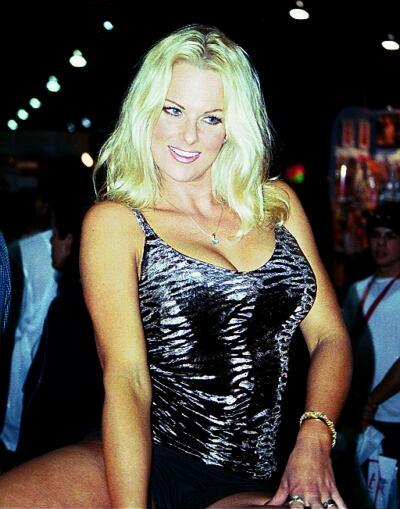
- Tyler in 2001
- Occupation: Pornographic film actress
- Spouse(s): Bobby Vitale (1996–1998); Name unknown (since early 2000s)
- Children: 1

Nikki Tyler is a former pornographic film actress best known for her work in the 1990s and for her selection as the December 1995 Penthouse Pet of the Month. She was inducted into the AVN Hall of Fame in 2026.

== Career ==
Tyler became Penthouse magazine's Pet of the Year in 1995.

== Personal life ==
While married, Tyler had an off-screen lesbian relationship with fellow porn actress Jenna Jameson. The couple lived together for a number of years before they separated. Jameson continued to see Tyler even during the period when she got involved with Jay Grdina. Tyler retired from the industry in the early 2000s. As of 2004, she is living with her husband and daughter in California.
