= Stacy Valentine =

American pornographic actress and model (born 1970)

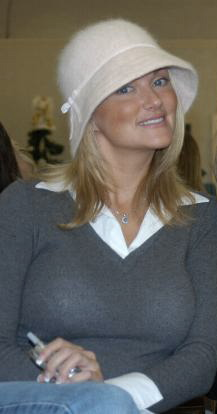
- Valentine at a Penthouse talent call in Woodland Hills, Los Angeles, December 2004
- Born: Stacy Baker; August 9, 1970 (age 56); Tulsa, Oklahoma, U.S.
- Other names: Stacy; Stacey; Stacey Valentin, Staci Valentine; Stacey Valentine
- Occupation: Pornographic actress
- Height: 5 ft 4 in (1.63 m)
- Website: stacyvalentine.com

Stacy Valentine (born Stacy Baker on August 9, 1970) is an American former pornographic actress. She is a member of both the AVN and XRCO Halls of Fame.

== Career ==
Married at a young age, Valentine posed for Gallery magazine's "Girl Next Door" amateur photo contest. She won the contest and parlayed this into a follow-up spread in Hustler magazine. While shooting for Hustler in Mexico, she posed for a boy-girl layout for Hustler’s offshoot magazine, Rage. She enjoyed the shoot and agreed to perform in Coast-to-Coast's hardcore film Bikini Beach 4. A week after filming, she returned home, packed up her belongings, left her husband, and moved to Los Angeles to become a full-time adult actress.

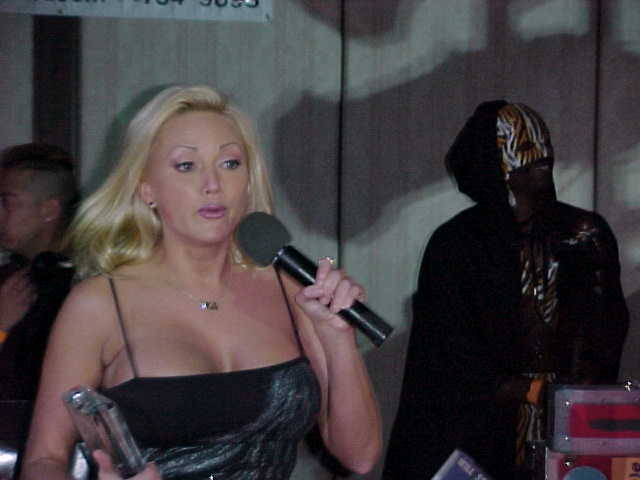
Stacy Valentine 1999 FOXE

Valentine took her stage name from the fact that she appeared in her first adult film on February 14, 1996. Her last film was made exactly four years later in 2000. Valentine knew early on that she did not want to be in the adult industry too long. "The goal when you get into the business is that you want to be a contract girl and you want to get the awards. I was a contract girl. I got the awards. I fought very hard to climb that ladder and I would be damned if I was going to climb down it. So I thought, this is a perfect time to make my exit."

=== The Girl Next Door ===
In the late-1990s, Valentine spent two years filming as the subject of a 1999 documentary called The Girl Next Door, by director Christine Fugate (not to be confused with the 2004 feature film of the same name). The movie also featured other adult film performers such as Nina Hartley, Jenna Jameson and Julian Andretti. The New York Times review of the film said:

Christine Fugate's melancholy documentary portrait of the porn star Stacy Valentine, suggests that the intersection of pornography and cosmetic surgery has given birth to a new genre of performer: the porn star as human approximation of an inflatable sex toy. With her platinum hair, fat-injected lips, breast implants and body planed by liposuction, Ms. Valentine doesn't look entirely real. Of course, that's probably the way her fans like it...her readiness to bare all emotionally as well as physically reveals a streak of grandiosity. Is it really an act of courage in this era of free-for-all confession for her to reveal so much? Or is it simply exhibitionism posing as truth-telling?

== Awards and nominations ==
- 1997 XRCO Award winner – Best New Starlet
- 1997 Editor's Choice – Best New Starlet
- 1998 F.O.X.E. Award – Female Fan Favorite (shared with Jenna Jameson, Tiffany Mynx & Stephanie Swift)
- 1998 Hot D'Or Award winner – Best American Starlet
- 1999 XRCO Award winner – Female Performer of the Year
- 1999 F.O.X.E. Award – Female Fan Favorite (shared with Alisha Klass & Christi Lake)
- 1999 Barcelona International Award – Best Actress
- 2009 XRCO Hall of Fame inductee
- 2012 AVN Hall of Fame inductee
