= Tom Byron =

American pornographic actor

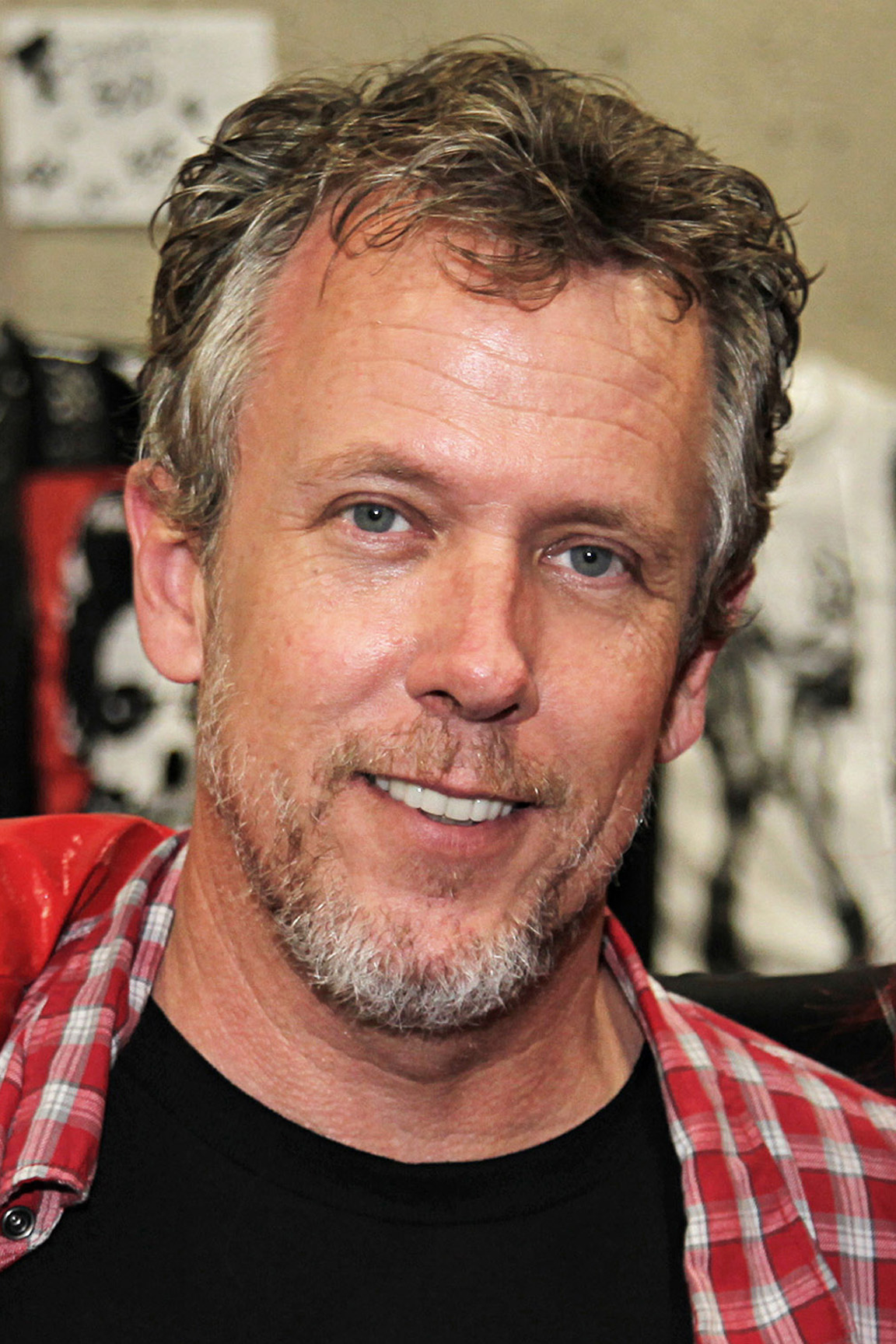
- Byron in 2012
- Born: Thomas Bryan Taliaferro Jr. April 4, 1961 (age 65); Orange, Texas, U.S.
- Other names: Tom Byrom; Tim Byron; Tom Bryon; Tom Byran; Tommy Byron; Thomas Bynum
- Occupations: Pornographic actor; director; producer
- Years active: 1982–1993, 1996–present (as performer); 1996–2013 (as director)

Tom Byron (born Thomas Bryan Taliaferro Jr.; April 4, 1961) is an American former pornographic actor, director, and producer. A member of the XRCO and the AVN Halls of Fame, he was voted #20 in AVN's list of top 50 pornstars of all time. Byron is also co-founder of Xtreme Professional Wrestling, a wrestling promotion that began in Los Angeles in 1999 and was resurrected in 2019 in Rochester, New York. He continues to work as an editor for XPW TV.

== Early life ==
Byron is of Italian descent and was raised in Orange, Texas. He attended Stark High School and later West Orange-Stark High School where he graduated in 1979. He attended Houston Baptist University on a full scholarship, but dropped out after a semester and moved to Los Angeles to pursue his dream of appearing in adult films.

== Acting ==
Byron first started acting in hardcore films in May 1982, and continued to perform mostly in roles portraying doctors or "coming of age" scenarios, as he resembled a teenager even though he was in his early to mid-20s. He starred alongside the underage Traci Lords in many films including her porn debut in early 1984, What Gets Me Hot!. He performed with Ginger Lynn in her second-ever scene, and claims that experience convinced the actress to remain in porn after her first scene with Ron Jeremy had her contemplating quitting the business. "America, you have me to thank for Ginger Lynn", Byron has said.

In porn's 1980s heyday, Byron says that pills such as Viagra did not yet exist to help male performers, and many including himself regularly smoked cannabis before filming as a means of getting in the mood. Byron did, however, begin to turn to pills for help later in his career. "Viagra kept me in the game for at least ten years after my due date", he says.

He was rumored to have had an ongoing off-screen relationship with Lords in the mid-80s, though in the years since he has alternately downplayed their relationship and admitted that he had been in love with her. He says he "fell hard" in love with porn actress Jill Kelly in the early 90s after the suicide of her estranged husband Cal Jammer. Byron also dated porn actress Tera Patrick early in her career.

He has changed his image several times throughout his career, frequently portraying a clean-shaven, adolescent virgin in his early years in porn. In 1986, he released a music video for his song "Cat Alley". By the early 1990s, Byron again changed his persona and appearance to that of a clean-cut "businessman" type.

In a 2020 interview, Byron said Jamie Summers was his all-time favorite co-star, citing her "amazing pussy". He named Jada Stevens and Gia Derza as his favorite then-current performers, though he retired before he had an opportunity to work with either of them.

In August 2003, Byron announced his retirement from performing to focus on his directing career. However, in 2006 he returned to performing in some scenes.

== Post-retirement ==
Byron currently resides in upstate New York. He says that a return to performing in porn is extremely unlikely, as age has caught up with him and he currently has problems maintaining an erection. "What am I... 59 now? I'm done! It's all over with," he said.

In 2020, Byron revealed that he is busy writing his autobiography with the help of author Mike Sager, whose work inspired the award-winning 1997 motion picture Boogie Nights. Byron has said there is already interest in turning his story into a major motion picture.

== Filmography ==
Byron appeared in about 3,200 videos in his pornographic career, making him the most credited actor in the Internet Adult Film Database as of January 2013.

His earliest video that can be dated with certainty is Anything Goes from 1982.

== Awards ==
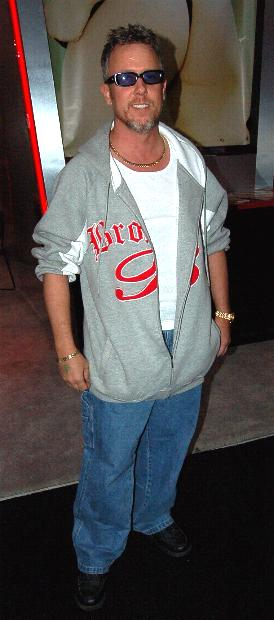
Byron at the AVN Awards in 2006

List of accolades received by Tom Byron
Awards
Award	Won
AVN Awards	16
CAFA Awards	1
AFAA Awards	1
XBIZ Awards	2
XRCO Awards	15
FSCLA Awards	1
F.O.X.E. Awards	1
- Total number of wins
Totals	42

AVN Awards
Year	Category	Nominated work
1985	Best Couples Sex Scene – Film	Kinky Business
1990	The Chameleon	Best Couples Sex Scene – Video
1992	Best Actor – Video	Sizzle
1998	Best Actor – Video	Indigo Delta
1998	Best Gonzo Series	Cumback Pussy
1998	Male Performer of the Year	—N/a
1999	Male Performer of the Year	—N/a
1999	Best Gonzo Release	Whack Attack 2
2000	Best Supporting Actor – Video	LA 399
2008	Best Actor	Layout
2008	Best Couples Sex Scene – Film	Layout
2010	Best Supporting Actor – Video	Throat: A Cautionary Tale
2011	Best Actor	The Big Lebowski: A XXX Parody
2011	Best Big Butt Series	Big Ass Fixation
2013	Best Supporting Actor	Star Wars XXX: A Porn Parody

CAFA Awards
Year	Category	Nominated work
1984	Best Actor	Private Teacher
1984	Best Couples Sex Scene	Private Teacher
1984	Best Supporting Actor	Sister Dearest

XBIZ Awards
Year	Category	Nominated work
2010	Male Porn Star of the Year (People's Choice)	—N/a
2017	Best Non-Sex Performance	Not Traci Lords XXX: '80s Superstars Reborn

AFAA Awards
Year	Category	Nominated work
1986	Best Erotic Scene	New Wave Hookers

F.O.X.E. Awards
Year	Category
1991	Male Fan Favorite
1992	Male Fan Favorite
1999	Male Fan Favorite
2012	Male Fan Favorite

FSCLA Awards
Year	Category
2002	Lifetime Achievement Award – Actor

XRCO Awards
Year	Category	Nominated work
1985	Stud of the Year	—N/a
1985	XRCO Video Stallion	—N/a
1986	XRCO Best Group Grope Scene	New Wave Hookers
1989	XRCO Best Male-Female Sex Scene	Naked Stranger
1989	Male Performer of the Year	—N/a
1990	XRCO Best Couples Sex Scene – Video	The Chameleon
1992	Best Anal Scene	Bend Over Babes II
1993	XRCO Hall of Fame inductee	—N/a
1996	Best Actor (Single Performance)	Flesh
1996	Best Anal or DP Scene	Car Wash Angels
1997	Best Actor	Indigo Delta
1997	Best Anal Scene	Behind the Sphinc Door
1997	Male Performer of the Year	—N/a
1998	Best Gonzo Series	Whack Attack
