= Mark Davis (actor) =

British-born Canadian pornographic actor, director, and exotic dancer

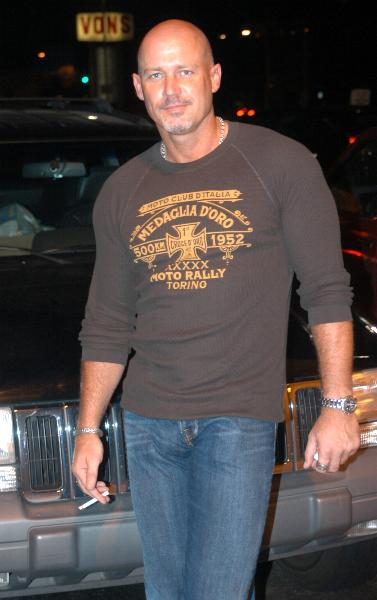
- Davis in 2005
- Born: 6 August 1965 (age 61); London, England
- Other names: Steve Scott; Stephen Scott; Steven Scott; Scott James; Marc Davis; Mark
- Occupations: Pornographic actor; director; exotic dancer
- Years active: 1993–2012; 2016–present
- Height: 6 ft 2 in (1.88 m)
- Spouse: Kobe Tai (m. 1997; div. 1999)

Mark Davis (born 6 August 1965) is an English former pornographic actor, director, and exotic dancer. In 1998, The Independent labeled him "Britain's biggest male porn star in America". In 2012, he announced his retirement from the adult industry. He has been inducted into the AVN and XRCO Halls of Fame.

== Early life ==
Davis grew up in Essex. In 1981, his family moved to Toronto, Ontario.

== Career ==
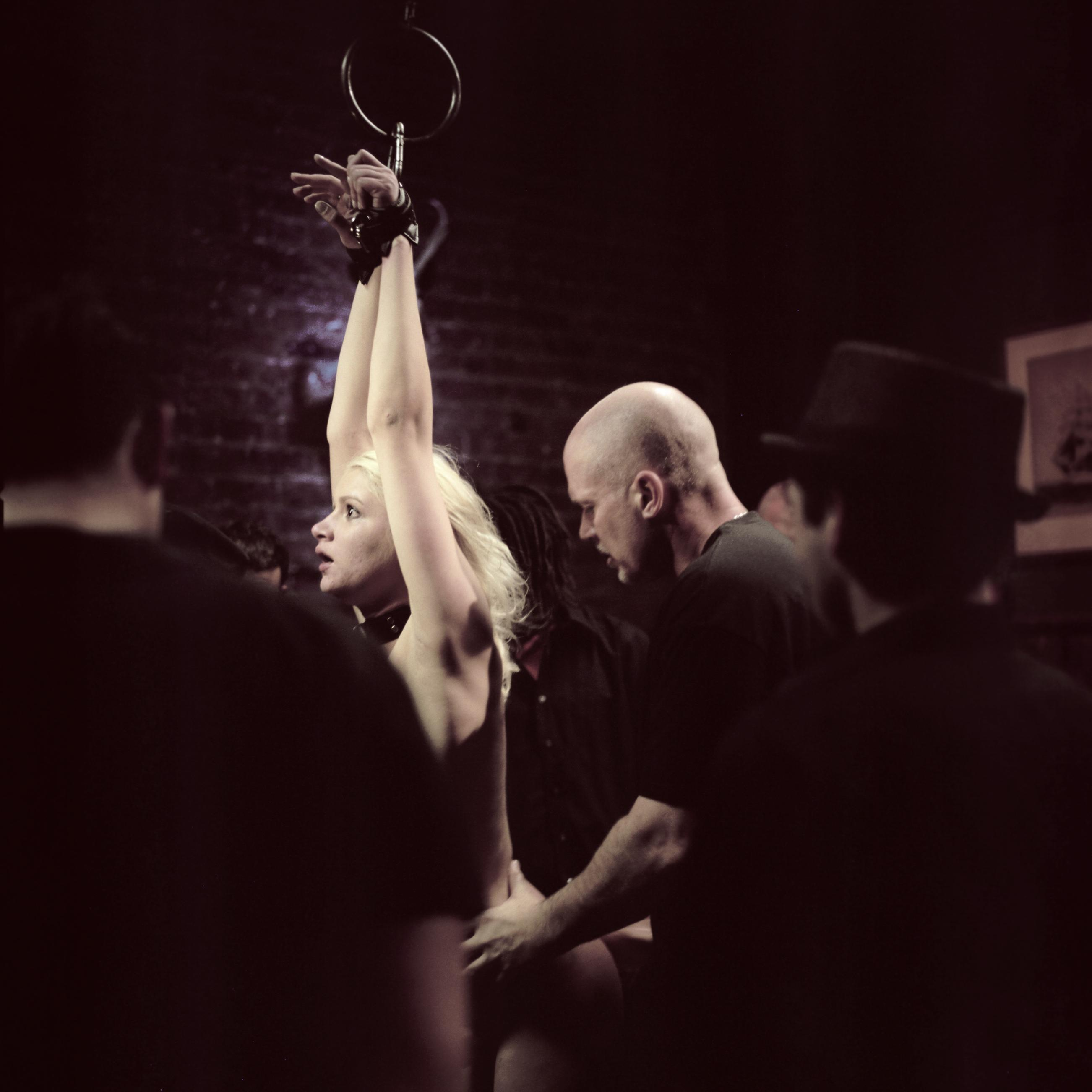
Davis in a pornographic shoot in 2011

After graduating from high school, he went to Los Angeles to shoot a Playgirl pictorial at 18 years of age. Soon thereafter, he moved to the US permanently. From 1984 to 1988, he was employed as a stripper for the "Chippendale" dancers. In January 1993, Davis began his career in adult films.

In 2003, Davis was inducted into the AVN Hall of Fame. In February 2006, he was inducted into the XRCO Hall of Fame.

In his last years (2009-2012), he worked primarily for kink.com, serving villainous roles in BDSM scenes. In 2012, Mark Davis announced his retirement from pornography, ending a nearly 20-year career. In 2016, Davis returned to pornography to shoot exclusively for kink.com.

Davis performed in about 2,400 videos in his pornographic career.

== Personal life ==
Davis was married to Kobe Tai and, later, Kitten. He served as best man for Jenna Jameson and Brad Armstrong's wedding in 1996. He was also a friend of Jon Dough, whose suicide affected him "big time."

== Awards ==
- 1994 XRCO Award – Best Anal Sex Scene (Butt Banged Bicycle Babes)
- 1996 AVN Award – Best Group Sex Scene, Video (World Anal Sex Tour)
- 1998 AVN Award – Best Anal Sex Scene, Video (Butt Banged Naughty Nurses)
- 2001 XRCO Award – Best Male-Female Sex Scene (Welcome to Chloeville)
- 2003 AVN Hall of Fame
- 2006 XRCO Hall of Fame
- 2009 AVN Award – Best Group Sex Scene (Anal Icon)

== See also ==
- List of British pornographic actors
