= List of pornographic film directors =

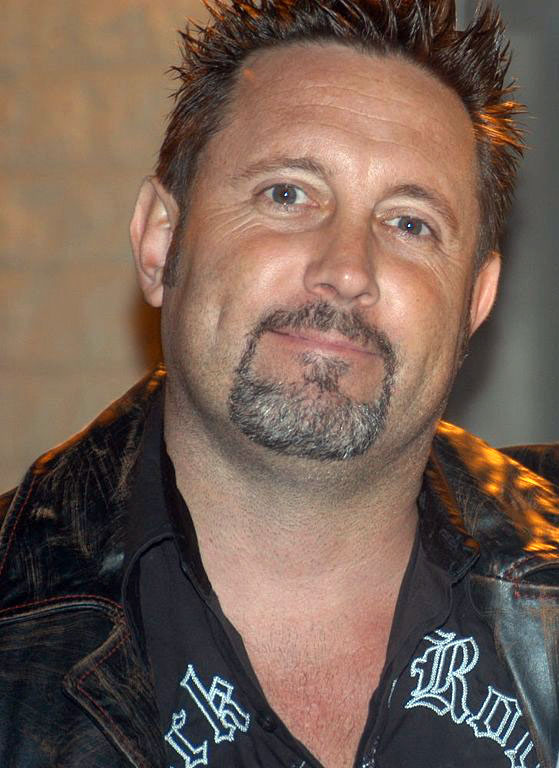
Brad Armstrong

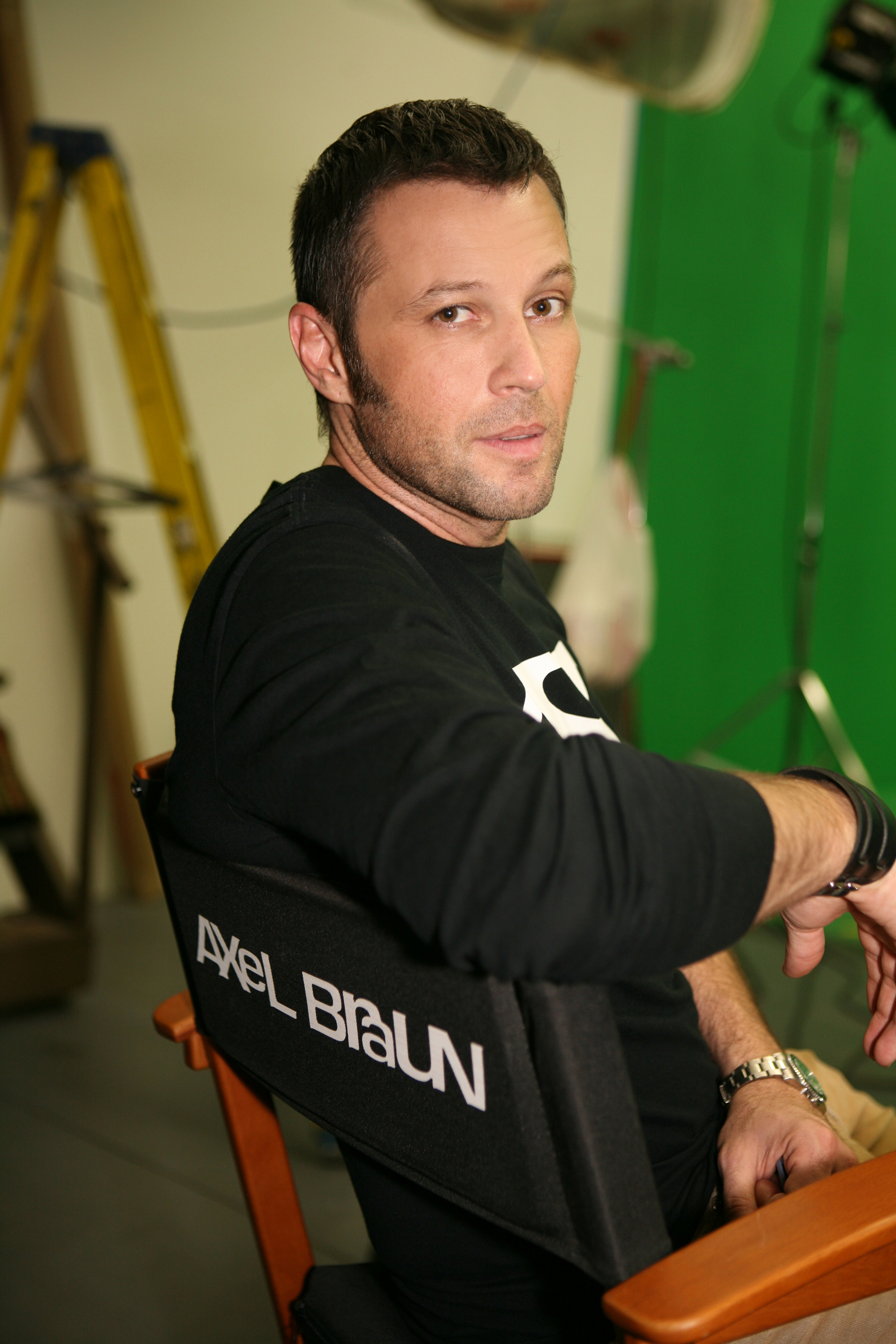
Axel Braun

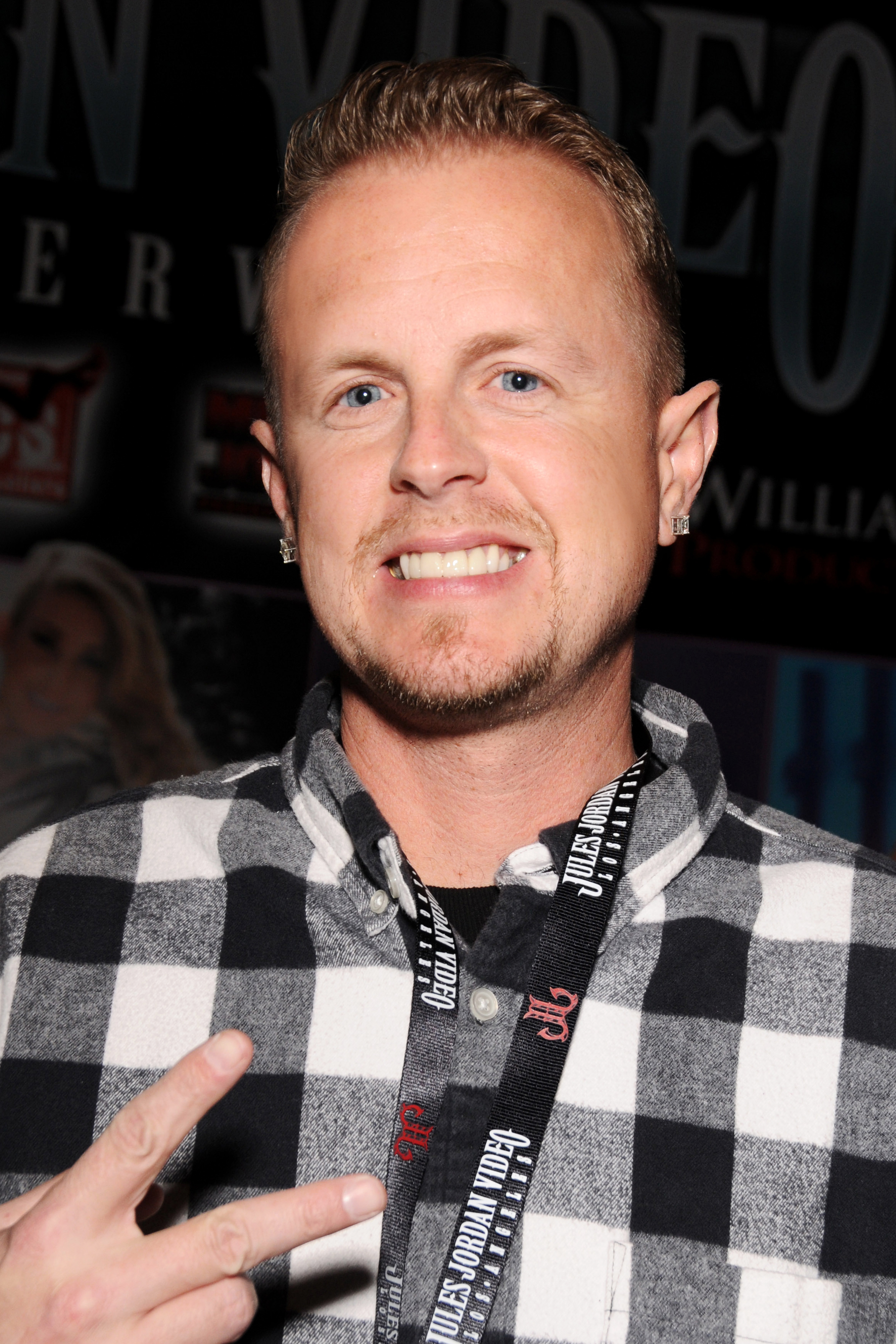
Jules Jordan

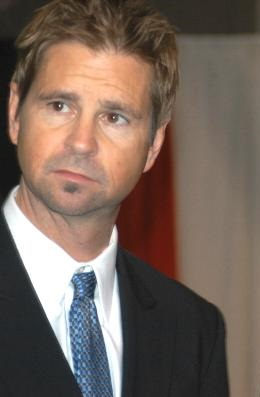
Will Ryder

This is a list of noted directors of pornographic films.

== A ==
- Buck Adams
- J. C. Adams
- Asa Akira
- Alexis Amore
- Joanna Angel
- Brad Armstrong

== B ==
- Jennifer Lyon Bell
- Belladonna
- Noel C. Bloom
- Mick Blue
- Vanessa Blue
- John T. Bone
- Lizzy Borden
- Michael Brandon
- Axel Braun
- Seymore Butts
- Tom Byron

== C ==
- Steve Cadro
- Casey Calvert
- Kim Chambers
- Bob Chinn
- David Aaron Clark
- Tiffany Clark
- Patrick Collins
- Zebedy Colt
- Eli Cross
- Christopher Cumingham
- Stoney Curtis

== D ==
- Gerard Damiano
- Stormy Daniels
- Gregory Dark
- Gia Darling
- Dillon Day
- Jewel De'Nyle
- Tom DeSimone
- Devon
- Dustin Diamond
- Skin Diamond
- Karen Dior
- Jerry Douglas
- Jessica Drake
- Steve Drake

== E ==
- Jim Enright
- Erik Everhard

== F ==
- Don Fernando
- Abel Ferrara
- Rod Fontana
- Scotty Fox

== G ==
- Jamie Gillis
- Gary Graver
- Jay Grdina
- Greg Lansky

== H ==
- Fred Halsted
- Max Hardcore
- Veronica Hart
- Jenna Haze
- William Higgins
- Melissa Hill
- Bobby Hollander
- Jim Holliday
- R. C. Hörsch
- Shine Louise Houston
- Cecil Howard
- Nicki Hunter
- Tom Hyde

== I ==
- Kylie Ireland

== J ==
- Jenna Jameson
- Mike John
- Ariana Jollee
- Joone
- Jules Jordan

== K ==
- Kimberly Kane
- Jill Kelly
- Jennifer Ketcham
- Tim Kincaid
- Bryan Kocis
- Michael Kulich

== L ==
- Devinn Lane
- Tory Lane
- Chi Chi LaRue
- Dyanna Lauren
- Dan Leal
- Bud Lee
- Hyapatia Lee
- Lorelei Lee
- Keiran Lee
- Sunny Leone
- John Leslie
- Harold Lime
- Fred J. Lincoln
- Lisa Ann
- Miles Long
- Michael Lucas
- Venus Lux
- Rakel Liekki

== M ==
- Anna Malle
- Mason
- Scott Masters
- Eon McKai
- Sean Michaels
- Mitchell brothers
- Sharon Mitchell
- Britt Morgan
- Paul Morris
- Michael Morrison
- Pat Myne
- Tiffany Mynx
- Lee Roy Myers

== N ==
- Nica Noelle
- Paul Norman
- Peter North

== O ==
- Bill Osco

== P ==
- Henri Pachard
- Gail Palmer
- Al Parker
- Wakefield Poole
- Ed Powers

== R ==
- Michael Raven
- Jack Remy
- Alex de Renzy
- Patti Rhodes
- Robby D.
- Toby Ross
- Bonnie Rotten
- Rob Rotten
- Will Ryder

== S ==
- Herschel Savage
- Stephen Sayadian
- Steven Scarborough
- Margie Schnibbe
- Bruce Seven
- Shane (actress)
- Alexandra Silk
- Joey Silvera
- J. D. Slater
- Aurora Snow
- P. J. Sparxx
- Anthony Spinelli
- Steven St. Croix
- Jacky St. James
- John Stagliano
- Ray Dennis Steckler
- Jim Steel (director)
- Michael Stefano
- Carter Stevens
- Kirdy Stevens
- Jeff Stryker

== T ==
- Jerome Tanner
- Alexis Texas
- Paul Thomas
- Viv Thomas
- Tiger Tyson

== V ==
- Dana Vespoli
- Chuck Vincent
- Tim Von Swine

== W ==
- Jane Waters
- Doris Wishman
- Pierre Woodman

== Y ==
- Prince Yahshua

== Z ==
- Ona Zee
- Howard Ziehm

== See also ==
- List of female film and television directors
- List of film and television directors
- List of pornographic performers by decade
- List of pornography companies
