= 16th AVN Awards =

US adult industry award ceremony in 1999

- Choices: The 1999 AVN Awards Show program cover
- Date: January 9, 1999
- Site: Bally's Las Vegas, Las Vegas, Nevada
- Hosted by: Robert Schimmel; Alisha Klass; Midori; Serenity
- Produced by: Gary Miller
- Directed by: Mark Stone
- Organized by: Adult Video News

Highlights
- Best Film: Looker
- Special Achievement: Larry Flynt; Sharon Mitchell; Shane; Eddie Wedelstedt; Greg Allan
- Best Direction: Nic Cramer
- Best Actor: James Bonn
- Best Actress: Shanna McCullough
- Hall of Fame: Lasse Braun; Nikki Charm; Bob Chinn; Diedre Holland; Tami Monroe; Richard Pacheco; Suze Randall; Patti Rhodes; Annie Sprinkle
- Most awards: Looker
- Most nominations: Café Flesh 2

Television coverage
- Network: Playboy TV

The 16th AVN Awards ceremony, organized by Adult Video News (AVN) honored the best of 1998 in pornographic movies and took place on January 9, 1999, at Bally's Las Vegas, Las Vegas, Nevada. During the ceremony, AVN presented AVN Awards in 68 categories. The ceremony, televised by Playboy TV, was produced by Gary Miller and directed by Mark Stone. Comedian Robert Schimmel returned as host and actresses Alisha Klass, Midori and Serenity co-hosted the award show. Five weeks earlier in a ceremony held at the Westin Bonaventure in Los Angeles, California, on December 4, 1998, the awards for gay pornographic movies were presented in a new separate ceremony known as the GayVN Awards.

Looker won six awards including Best Film. Other winners included Café Flesh 2 with four awards, Tushy Heaven with three and Euro Angels 10, Forever Night, Masseuse 3, Models, Pornogothic, The Pornographer, Strange Life: The Breech, Tatiana each with two.

== Winners and nominees ==
When the nominees for the 16th AVN Awards were announced, Café Flesh 2 earned the most nominations with 14; Models came in second place with 13. A new committee of 51 industry professionals voted to select the best in each category. There were 30 AVN voters.

The winners were announced during the awards ceremony on January 9, 1999. Besides winning Best Film, Looker's awards haul also included wins for Best Actress to Shanna McCullough, who won her first acting award 12 years earlier, and Best Director—Film to Nic Cramer, his second in consecutive years. Co-host Klass won Best New Starlet with Tom Byron and Chloe winning Male and Female Performer of the Year awards respectively. Erotic X-Film Guide suggested that with gonzo porn making a mark for itself in hardcore, the Best Gonzo Video and Best Gonzo Series awards, won by Whack Attack 2 and Seymore Butts respectively, were "perhaps the most important this past year."

=== Awards ===
Winners are listed first and highlighted in boldface.

Best Film	Best Video Feature
**Looker**; Appassionata; Carnal Instincts; Debbie Does Dallas: The Next Generation; Love's Passion; Masseuse 3; Models; Phoenix Rising; Shipwreck; White Angel	**Café Flesh 2**; Chamber of Whores; Exile; Flashpoint; Forbidden; Heartache; L.A. Uncovered; The Lecher 2; Lust & Lies; Mission Erotica; One Size Fits All; Penitent Flesh; Pornogothic; Taboo 17; Turn About

==== Performances ====
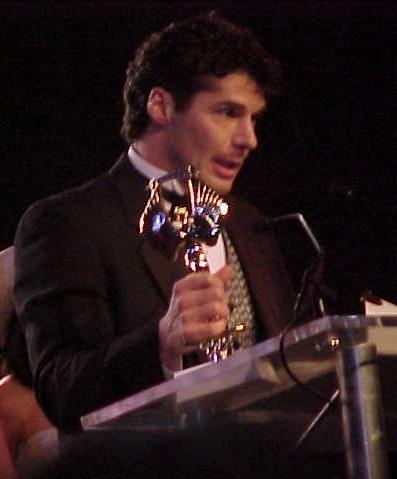
James Bonn accepting his award for Best Actor—Film

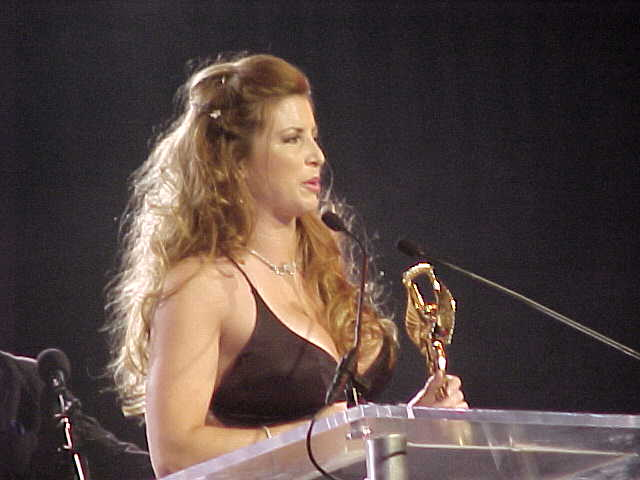
Shanna McCullough accepting her award for Best Actress—Film

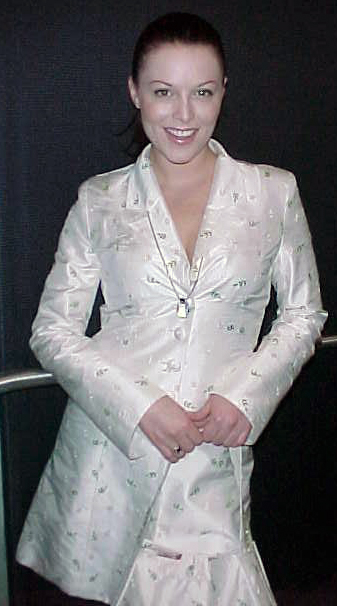
Alisha Klass, Best New Starlet winner

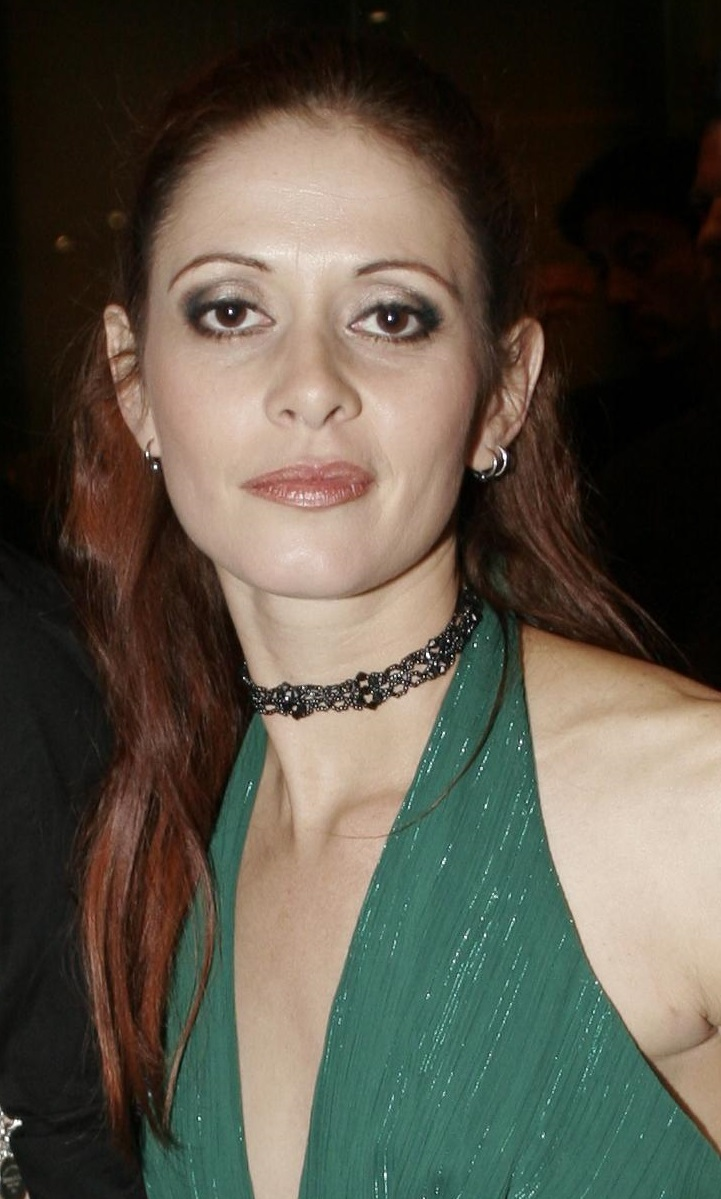
Chloe, Female Performer of the Year winner

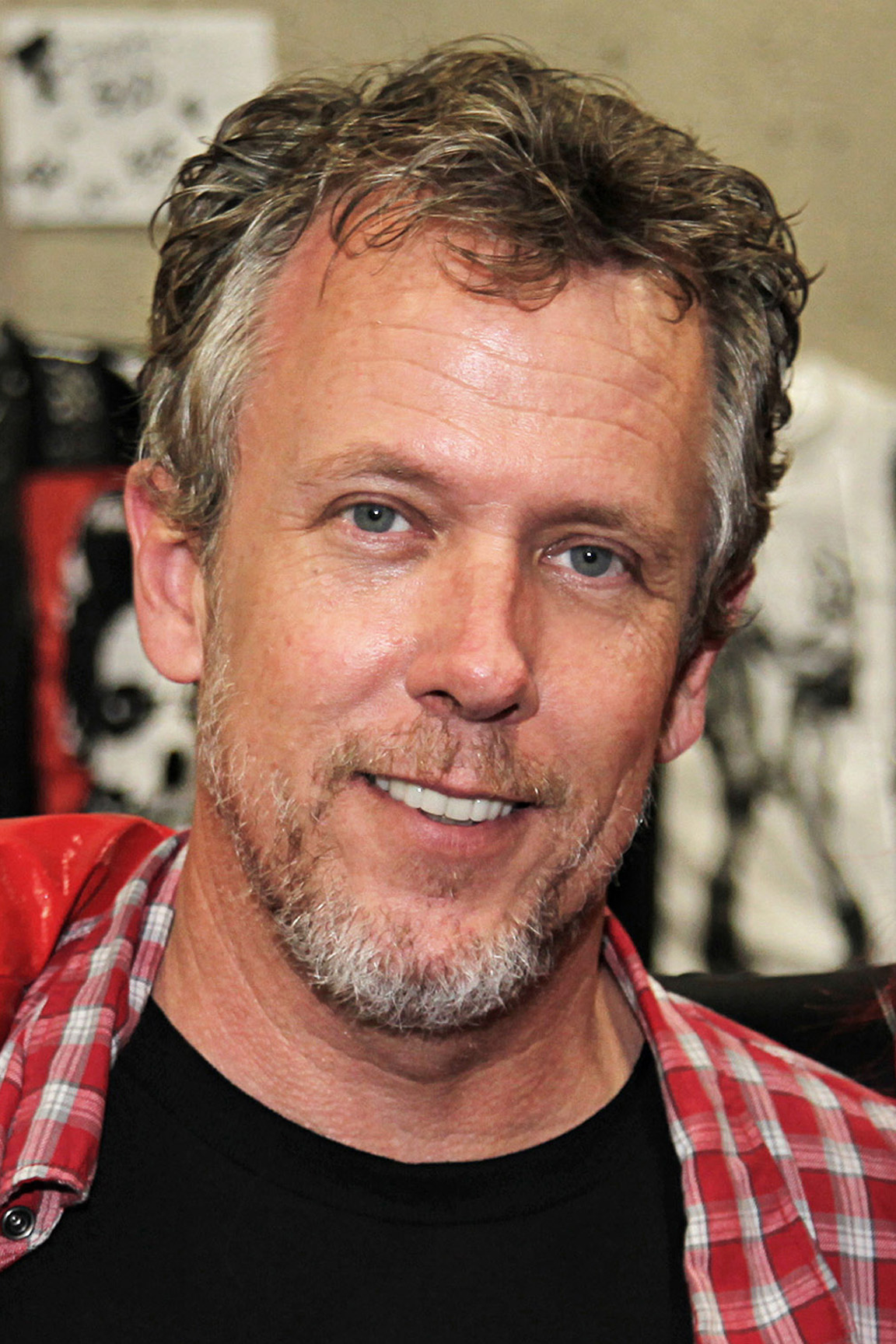
Tom Byron, Male Performer of the Year winner

Best Actor—Film	Best Actor—Video
**James Bonn – Models**; Tom Byron – Carnal Instincts; Jon Dough – Shipwreck; Mickey G. – Love's Passion; Jonathan Morgan – Prey; Wilde Oscar – Eros Instinct; Herschel Savage – Phoenix Rising; Alex Sanders – Appassionata; Kyle Stone – The Kiss; Vince Vouyer – Mobster's Wife	**Michael J. Cox – L.A. Uncovered**; James Bonn – Bed of Roses; Tyce Buné – Turn About; Tom Byron – One Size Fits All; Anthony Crane – Deep Throat: The Quest Begins; Dave Hardman – Chamber of Whores; Alec Metro – Exile; Jonathan Morgan – Thai Me Up; Kyle Stone – Snatchers; Tony Tedeschi – In Your Dreams
Best Actress—Film	Best Actress—Video
**Shanna McCullough – Looker**; Kaitlyn Ashley – Beautiful; Asia Carrera – Appassionata; Taylor Hayes – Masseuse 3; Lené Hefner – Deception; Missy – The Good, the Bad and the Wicked; Sydnee Steele – Shattered Vows; Stephanie Swift – Prey; Tina Tyler – Models; Stacy Valentine – White Angel	**Jeanna Fine – Café Flesh 2**; Asia Carrera – Thai Me Up; Raquel DeVine – Snatchers; Morgan Fairlane – Forbidden; Melissa Hill – Turn About; Toni James – Public Affairs; Jill Kelly – Exile; Misty Rain – Taboo 17; Serenity – Date From Hell; Taren Steele – Rainwoman 12; Stephanie Swift – Beautiful Evil; Kobe Tai – Mission Erotica; Sunset Thomas – Lust and Lies; Tina Tyler – Hanky Panky; Stacy Valentine – Habits of the Heart
Best Supporting Actor—Film	Best Supporting Actor—Video
**Michael J. Cox – Models**; Mike Horner – Appassionata; J. D. Ram – Models; Herschel Savage – Masseuse 3; Tony Tedeschi – Mobster's Wife	**Jamie Gillis – Forever Night**; Brad Armstrong – Exile; T. T. Boy – Freak; Tom Byron – Hanky Panky; Ian Daniels – Date From Hell; Ron Jeremy – Nude World Order; Mickey G. – Flashpont; Dave Hardman – X Factor 3; Jonathan Morgan – Nurse Sadie; Kyle Stone – To Live and Love in L.A.; Marc Wallice – Thai Me Up
Best Supporting Actress—Film	Best Supporting Actress—Video
**Chloe – Masseuse 3**; Dru Berrymore – Models; Shayla LaVeaux – Bad Sister; Shanna McCullough – Love's Passion; Sharon Mitchell – Debbie Does Dallas: The Next Generation; Misty Rain – Red Vibe Diaries 2; Alexandra Silk – Mobster's Wife; Stephanie Swift – Shipwreck; Tina Tyler – Shattered Vows; Nancy Vee – Models	**Katie Gold – Pornogothic**; Johnni Black – Date From Hell; Chloe – Dinner Party at Six; Roxanne Hall – L. A. Uncovered; Melissa Hill – One Size Fits All; Heather Hunter – Where the Boys Aren't 10; Jill Kelly – Flashpont; Stephaie Swift – Turn About
Best New Starlet	Best Tease Performance
**Alisha Klass**; Nikki Anderson; Jessica Darlin; Dee; Elena; Katie Gold; Malitia; Mocha; Samantha Stylle; Shelbee Myne; Stryc-9; Temptress; Inari Vachs	**Ava Lustra – Leg Sex Dream**; Brittany Andrews – Barefoot Confidential; Crystal Knight – Best Butt(e) in the West 4; Anita Dark – Bodyslammin': Shake & Tumble; Nikki Anderson – Buttman in Budapest; Tia Bella – Camera Shy; Ava Lustra – Every Woman Has a Foot Fantasy; Nikki Anderson – The Lecher; Jessica Darlin – Planet of the Gapes 2; Jill Kelly – Skin: Cuntrol; Raylin – Sodomania 24; Charlie – Welcome to the Cathouse; Temptress – Wet Cotton Panties 5
Female Performer of the Year	Male Performer of the Year
**Chloe**; Johnni Black; Asia Carrera; Roxanne Hall; Alisha Klass; Jill Kelly; Midori; Mocha; Tiffany Mynx; Silvia Saint; Serenity; Stacy Valentine	**Tom Byron**; Christoph Clark; Van Damage; Dave Hardman; Brandon Iron; Mr. Marcus; Sean Michaels; Alex Sanders; Kyle Stone; Vince Vouyer
Best Non-Sex Performance—Film or Video
**Robert Black – The Pornographer**; Mike Alba – Nude World Order; Anthony Crane – White Angel; Simon Delo – Café Flesh 2; Dukey Flyswatter – Terrors from the Clit; Veronica Hart – Café Flesh 2; Gloria Leonard – Phoenix Rising; John Leslie – The Lecher 2; Ron Vogel – Exile

==== Sex Scenes ====
Best All-Girl Sex Scene—Film	Best All-Girl Sex Scene—Video
**Laura Palmer, Ruby, Charlie, Claudia – White Angel**; Flower, Nikki Tyler, Charlie – Carnal Instincts; Shane, Stephanie Swift – Debbie Does Dallas: The Next Generation; RayVeness, Shayla LaVeaux, Tina Tyler – Love's Passion; Gwen Summers, Coral Sands – Phoenix Rising; Lauren Montgomery, Lacy Ogden – Shattered Vows; Kobe Tai, Stephanie Swift, Kelly Jean – Sleepover; Ruby, Serenity – Wicked Cover Girls	**Caressa Savage, Roxanne Hall, Charlie – Buttslammers 16**; Raylene, Christgen Wolf – Action Sports Sex 2; Jill Kelly, Toni James – Erotic Pool Party; Juli Ashton, Taren Steele – Essentially Juli; Juli Ashton, Amber Lynn – Fade to Blue; Ava Lustra, Kerry Matthews – Leg Sex Dream; Ruby, Raylin Sydnee Steele – Nasty Girls 17; 18-girl orgy (Annah Marie, Ashley Renee, Carolina, Charlie, Crystal Knight, Dee, Devin Chang, Janis Jones, Kristina St. James, Lexi Erickson, Liza Harper, Monique DeMoan, Montana Gunn, Morgan Navarro, Nellie Pierce, Randee Lee, RayVeness, Sydnee Steele) – No Man's Land 20; Katie Gold, Asia Carrera – Pornogothic; Caressa Savage, Misty Rain – Taboo 17; Alisha Klass, Samantha Stylle, Elle DeVyne, Elena – Tushy Girls Slumber Party; Jennifer Worthington, Dee, Azlea – Welcome to the Cathouse; The orgy finale (Felecia, Gina Ryder, Malitia, Marilyn Star, Nicole Lace, Roxanne Hall, T. J. Hart, Temptress) – Welcome to the Cathouse; Heather Hunter, Janine – Where the Boys Aren't 10
Best Anal Sex Scene—Film	Best Anal Sex Scene—Video
**Chloe, Steve Hatcher, Tony Tedeschi – The Kiss**; Kaitlyn Ashley, Jon Dough – Beautiful; Tye, Shanna McCullough, Julian St. Jox – Eros Instinct; Kobe Tai, Mark Davis – The Lie; Silvia Saint, Hakan – Looker; Shayla LaVeaux, RayVeness, Tina, John Decker – Love's Passion; Chloe, Herschel Savage – Masseuse 3; Christi Lake, Julian St. Jox, Jake Steed – Ravishing Royalty; Liza Harper, Ian Daniels, Brian Surewood – Shattered Vows; Jacklyn Lick, Michael J. Cox – The Show 3	**Sean Michaels, Samantha Stylle, Alisha Klass – Tushy Heaven**; Szonjoa, Greta, Vince Vouyer, Lexington Steele – Anabolic World Sex Tour 16; Omar, Alex, Kelly, Emma – Ben Dover's Crack Attack; Red, Paschal, Bob, Ben Dover – Ben Dover's Extremely Wild Wenches; Liza Harper, Marc Wallice, Jake Steed, Byron Long – Beyond Reality 5; Sylvia, Reka, Nikki Anderson, Amanda Steel, Judith Grant, Alex Sanders, Mark Davis – Bodyslammin' 2: Down & Dirty; Nikki Anderson, Christoph Clark, Andrew Youngman – Buttman in Budapest; Johnni Black, Steve Hatcher, Katie Gold – Depraved Fantasies 5; Iroc, Van Damage, Tiffany Mynx – Lewd Behavior: 2nd Offense; Tom Byron, Stryc-9 – Lord of Asses; Careena Collins, Mr. Marcus, Julian St. Jox – 100% Amateur 45; Christgen Wolf, Alec Metro – Party Girls; Jessica Darlin, Iroc, Tom Byron – Planet of the Gapes 2; Chloe, Sean Michaels – Sean Michaels' Up Your Ass 7; Elena, Mark Davis – S.M.U.T. 7; Tiffany Mynx, Mark Davis – Whack Attack
Best Couples Sex Scene—Film	Best Couples Sex Scene—Video
**Stephanie Swift, Mickey G. – Shipwreck**; Brook April, Fred Thomas – An American Girl in Paris; N'J DeBahia, Jon Dough – Beautiful; Nikki Tyler, T. T. Boy – Carnal Instincts; Lexus, Jon Dough – Debbie Does Dallas: The Next Generation; Silvia Saint, Hakon – Looker; Juli Ashton, Mickey G. – Love's Passion dream sequence; Taylor Hayes, James Bonn – Masseuse 3; Julie Meadows, Brian Surewood – Phoenix Rising; Anita Blond, Vince Vouyer – Wet	**Jill Kelly, Eric Price – Dream Catcher**; Taylor Moore, Kyle Stone – Backseat Driver 3; Anita Dark, Alex Sanders – Bodyslammin': Shake & Tumble; Amanda Steele, Rocco – Buttman in Budapest; Jeanna Fine, Brian Surewood – Café Flesh 2; Ava Lustra, The Doctor – Every Woman Has a Foot Fantasy; Jenna Jameson, T. T. Boy – Flashpoint; Chloe, Tony Tedeschi – Leather World; Judith Grant, John Walton – The Lecher; Katie Gold, Marc Wallice – Nude World Order; Lexi Eriksson, Valentino – Nurses to the Rescue; Amytheist, Tom – Shane's World 11; Erika Bella, Peter North – Sodomania 24; Alisha Klass, Seymore Butts – Think Sphinc; Ilana Moore, Jake Steed – The Voyeur 11
Best Group Sex Scene—Film	Best Group Sex Scene—Video
**Taylor Hayes, Mr. Marcus, Billy Glide – Masseuse 3**; Randi Rage, Kaitlyn Ashley, Jon Dough – Beautiful; Lexus, Toni James, Vince Vouyer – Debbie Does Dallas: The Next Generation; Erika Bella, Shanna McCullough, Vince Vouyer – Looker; Shayla LaVeaux, RayVeness, John Decker – Love's Passion; Tina Tyler, Michael J. Cox, Nancy Vee, James Bonn – Models; Deva Station, Alexandra Silk, Jon Dough – Shipwreck; Mark Davis, Leanni Lei, Kimberly Jade – White Angel	**Sean Michaels, Alisha Klass, Samantha Stylle, Halli Aston, Wendy Knight – Tushy Heaven**; Dina Jewel, Mr. Marcus, Mark Davis – World Sex Tour 13; Iroc, Stryc-9, Tiffany Mynx, Luciano, Van Damage – Asswoman in Wonderland; Wendy, Ben Dover, Two guys (Alex Kater, Bob Scott) – Ben Dover's British Housewives Fantasies; Holly Body, Katie Gold, Jessie James, Dakota, Alex Sanders, Alec Metro – Bodyslammin': Shake & Tumble; Kathy Divine, Sophie Call, Rocco – Buttman's Rolling Cheeks; Johnni Black, four guys – Depraved Fantasies 5 Gothic gangbang; Jill Kelly, Sindee Coxx, Johnni Black, Steve Drake, Brad Armstrong, Mickey G., Mike Horner – Flashpoint; Inari Vachs, Shelbee Myne, Sean Michaels, Paul Coxx – Fresh Meat 5; Ilana Moore, Brian Surewood, Mark Davis – The Lecher; Byron Long, Macho, Dee, Monique, India – My Baby Got Back 15; Tom Byron, Jessica Darlin, Iroc – Planet of the Gapes 2; Kendra Jade, Brandon Iron, David Steel – Thrillsex scene in supermarket; Alexa Schiffer, Wendy, Andrew Youngman, Jean-Yves LeCastel – The Voyeur 11; Sean Michaels, Temptress, Malitia Alex Dane – Whack Attack 2
Best Sex Scene in a Foreign Release	Best Solo Sex Scene
**10-person hotel orgy (Agness, Anna, Jessika, Laura, Laura Black, Lina, Niki Blue, an eighth girl, David Perry, Andrew Youngman) – Euro Angels 10**; Deborah, Kiki, Bionca, Jean-Yves LeCastel, Leslie Taylor – Assman 4; Isaphan fourway (Ispahan, Vanda Vitus, Christoph Clark, Yves Baillat) – Euro Angels 4; Katya Kean, Andrew Youngman, et al. (Bolivia Samsonite, Brigitta) – Fatal Orchid; Airplane hangar scene – Planet Sexxx; Meat packing plant scene – Rocco Never Dies; Five-man "Marquis" gangbang (Rita Cardinale, Bruno SX, David Perry, Frank Versace, Jean-Michel Kossa, Mephisto) – Tatiana; Tanya Russof, Dimitri – Tatiana 3; Silvia Saint, Micha, etc. (David Perry, Frank Gun) – Triple X Files: Enjoy Silvie; Ann-Marie, Rocco Siffredi, Omar – When Rocco Meats Kelly	**Toni James – Finger Lickin' Good**; Felecia – The House That Black Built; Nakita Ka$h – Real Female Masturbation; Jill Kelly – L.A. Fashion Girls; Alisha Klass – Seymore Butts Does Europe II; Krisztina – Lil' Women: Vestal Virgins 3; Lovette – Girls Home Alone; Kay London – Pussy Poppers 3; Taylor Moore – Girls Home Alone 4; Teri Starr – Pussy Poppers 6; Stacy Valentine – Forever Night
Most Outrageous Sex Scene
**Mila – Ass Artist** ass painting scene; Johnny Toxic, Candy Hill, A. Cake – Asscakes; Charlie, Kay London, Nicole London – Cat Scratch Fever milk fight scene; Nancy Vee – Models plunger scene; Helicopter Man scene – Samurai Debutantes

==== By Genre ====
Best All Sex Film	Best All Sex Video
**High Heels**; Delirious; Wet; Wicked Cover Girls; Delirious	**Fresh Meat 5**; Beyond Reality 5; Depraved Fantasies 5; Dream Catcher; Eros; Forever Night; Hustler's Pool Party; Layered; Skin: Cuntrol; Spellbinders
Best Gonzo Video	Best Vignette Tape
**Whack Attack 2**; Anabolic World Sex Tour 16; Ben Dover's British Housewives Fantasies; Bodyslammin' 2: Down & Dirty; Buttman in Budapest; Essentially Juli; Party Girls; Tom Byron's Cumback Pussy 10; The Voyeur 11	**Sodomania 24**; Dogtales; Gang Bang Auditions; Hustler Presents: Love Letters; Perverted Stories 16; Puritan Video Magazine 20; S.M.U.T. 4; Tails of Perversity 4; Wet Spots; White Trash Whore 9; Whore Stories; Wired for Sex
Best Anal-Themed Feature	Best Comedy
**Tushy Heaven**; Anal Examiner; Assman 4; Asswoman in Wonderland; Ben Dover's Crack Attack; Booty Duty 2; Buttholes Are Forever; Lewd Behavior: 2nd Offense; Lord of Asses; Only the A Hole; Planet of the Gapes 2; Rectal Rooter; Rocco's True Anal Stories; Sean Michaels' Up Your Ass 7	**The Pornographer**; Date From Hell; Hanky Panky; Homey in the Haystack; The Kiss; Nude World Order; Nurse Sadie; Nurses To the Rescue; Porno News; Sudden Passions; Terrors from the Clit; Thai Me Up
Best All-Girl Feature	Best Alternative Video
**Welcome to the Cathouse**; Buttslammers 16; Eat at the Pussy Café; Girls Home Alone 4; Nasty Girls 18; No Man's Land 20; San Francisco 69'ers; Shane's Slumber Party 2; Violation of Marylin Star; Where the Boys Aren't 10	**Memorial Weekend T & A '98, Vol. 2**; Buttman At Nudes-A-Poppin' 5; Hellcats in High Heels; Nude Paradise Club #224 Vol. 2; Jenna Exposed; Naked at the Lake; Penthouse Love Games; Playboy's Playmates Revisited; Playboy Video Centerfold: 1998 Playmate of the Year; Strip Shop; Sweetheart Murders; Taoist Sexuality: Energy, Elements, Ecstasy
Best CD-ROM	Best DVD
**Days of Oblivion**; Betty Page; Supermodels 2; Virtual Sex With Farrah	**Shock**; Bodyslammin' 2: Down & Dirty; Conquest; Debbie Does Dallas: The Next Generation; Dream Catcher; Jeff Stryker's Underground; New Wave Hookers 5; Night Trips; Penetrator 2; The Pyramid 1, 2 & 3; Secrets of the Kama Sutra; Zazel
Best Ethnic-Themed Video	The Hot Video Award
**Dinner Party at Six**; Black Erotic Moments 6; Black Street Hookers 12; Ebony Muff Divers; Freaks, Whoes & Flows; Ho' In; Inner City Black Cheerleader Search 22; Isis Blue; Manhattan Black; My Baby Got Back 15; Sugar Walls 6; Tokyo Summer Camp Girls; 24•7, Vol. 9; Wonton Workers'	(France's Hot Video magazine presents its award for Best American Production Released in France): **Drop Sex**; Buda; Café Flesh 2; Control; Cumback Pussy 6; Models; One Track Mind; Queen's Challenge; Zazel
Best Foreign Release	Best Foreign Vignette Tape
**Tatiana 1, 2 & 3**; Aphrodite: Goddess of Love; Citizen Shane; Debauchery; Fatal Orchid 1 & 2; Light My Fire; Planet Sexxx; Profession: Porn Actress; Rocco Never Dies 1 & 2; Sinful Desires 1 & 2; The Temptation of Clarisse; That$ Life 2	**Euro Angels 10**; Avena Extra Edition: Hungarian Style, Issue 2; Euro Angels 2; Euro Angels 3; Euro Angels 8; Lee Nover 6; Lil' Women: Vestal Virgins 3; No Mercy; Ritch Bitch; Triple X Files: Adele; Triple X Files: Katya Kean
Best Oral-Themed Feature	Best Pro-Am or Amateur Tape
**(Tie)**: **Blowjob Fantasies**; **Coed Cocksuckers 7**; The Blowjob Adventures of Dr. Fellatio 5; The Blowjob Adventures of Dr. Fellatio 10; Coed Cocksuckers 6; Cock Smokers; Deep Throat: The Quest Begins; In the Mouths of Babes; Interracial Fellatio 2; It Don't Matter Just Don't Bite It 3; Shut Up and Blow Me!; Shut Up and Blow Me! 2	**The Coeds 44**; Adventures in Pantyland 1; Amateurs Only 90; Amateur USA 4; Beaver Hunt 3; The Clean Up Woman; The Coeds 44; Fresh Faces 19; Global Warming Debutantes 11; Homegrown Video 500; More Dirty Debutantes 90; Triple X Amateur 86; Up and Cummers 54; Up and Cummers 56; Video Virgins 40
Best Specialty Tape—Big Bust	Best Specialty Tape—Bondage
**Big Tit Betrayal**; Big Boob Bangeroo 11; Boobsville Cabaret; Brown Sugar Babes 2; Chloe's Big Tit Conquests; Dirty Deeds; Double D Dolls 6; Natural Wonders of the World; Stacked: Titanic Tits; Stacked 2: Nightmare in Titsville; Wild Wild Chest 6	**Uncut**; Abduction of Chloe; Authentic Divas: Brutal Submission; The Boiler Room; Dark Paradise; Doomsday; Dresden Diary 18; Extreme Tit Torture; I Spit on Your Slave; Leather Bound Dykes from Hell 10; Raging Pain; Summer and Skye's Bondage Party; Tokyo Torture Chamber; Valentine's Day Massacre; Whipped Wet
Best Specialty Tape—Other Genre	Best Specialty Tape—Spanking
**Strange Life: The Breech**; Babes Ballin' Boys 4; Barefoot Confidential; Bend Over Boyfriend; Box of Laughter: Dueling Pages; Every Woman Has a Foot Fantasy; Hardcore Male-Female Oil Wrestling 2; Hot 50+ Two; Latin Plump Humpers; Leg Sex Dream; Leg Sex Fantasy; Little Anal Granny: Back to College; Nina Hartley's Guide to Sex Toys; Toe Tales 52; 2000 Lbs. of Love	**C.P. Research Institute**; The Caning 2; Discipline Daze II; Lingerie Models Spanked; Hotel Service; Mistress Tara's Finishing School; Spank Master 4
Best Transsexual Tape
**The Big-Ass She-Male Adventure**; Cocks 'n Frocks 6; Mommy Queerest; Real Transsexuals; Sex Changes; Sexual Transsexuals 2; That Darn Tranny; The Tranny-Sylvanians; Trans-Asian; Transsexual University: Cheerleader Ed.'

==== Marketing ====
Best Box Cover Concept	Best Packaging
**Castle of Lucretia (In-X-Cess International)**; The Art of Bondage (M. Zabel Productions); Afterglow (Wicked Pictures); Best Friends (Vivid Video); Café Flesh 2 (VCA Platinum Plus); Eros (Wicked Pictures); Phoenix Rising (Pleasure Limited Editions); The Rear Arrangers (Sterling Pictures); Skin: Cuntrol (Eurotique Entertainment); Skin 13 (Eurotique Entertainment); Thai Me Up (Cal Vista Video/Metro); Vortex (VCA Platinum Plus); Wicked Cover Girls (Wicked Pictures)	**Exile (Wicked Pictures)**; Beautiful Evil (Sin City Ultra); Date From Hell (Wicked Pictures); Fantasy Lane (Vivid Film); Flashflood 2 (Coast to Coast Video); Heartache (Wicked Pictures); Intimate Exposure (VCA Platinum Plus); The Look (Vivid Film); Looker (Pleasure Limited Editions); Mobster's Wife (Vivid Film); No Man's Land 20 (Video Team); Pornogothic (Wicked Pictures); Thrust Fault (VCA Platinum Plus); Words of Lust (Klimaxxx Productions)
Best Overall Marketing Campaign— Individual Title or Series	Best Overall Marketing Campaign—Company Image
**Flashpoint (Wicked Pictures)**; Cape Sin (Sin City Ultra); Eros (Wicked Pictures); Janine & Vince Neil • Hardcore & Uncensored (IEG/S&D Video); Nude World Order (Sin City Ultra); One Size Fits All (Adam & Eve Productions); Pam & Tommy Lee • Hardcore & Uncensored (IEG/S&D Video); Pornogothic (Wicked Pictures); Sexy Nurses 3 (Cal Vista Video/Metro)	**Wicked Pictures**; Elegant Angel Video; Evil Angel Productions; Metro, Inc.; Odyssey Group Video; Sin City Entertainment; VCA Pictures; Video Team; Vivid Video; Zane Entertainment Group

==== Series ====
Best Continuing Video Series	Best Ethnic-Themed Series
**White Trash Whore (JM Productions/Legend)**; 18 and Nasty (Devil's Films/IVC); 24•7 (Fat Dog Productions); Cherry Poppers: The College Years (Zane Entertainment Group); Nina Hartley: How To (Adam & Eve Productions); Nineteen Video Magazine (Dane Productions/Forbidden Films); No Man's Land (Video Team); PickUp Lines (Odyssey Group Video); Screw My Wife, Please (Tight Ends Productions); S.M.U.T. (Elegant Angel Video); Wet Cotton Panties (CDi Entertainment Group)	**Inner City Black Cheerleader Search (Woodburn/IVC)**; Black Dirty Debutantes (Ed Powers Productions); Black Street Hookers (Devil's Films/IVC); Bootylicious (JM Productions/Legend); Chocolate Covered Cherry Poppers (Zane Entertainment Group); Freaks, Whoes & Flows (Jake Steed Productions); My Baby Got Back (Video Team); Nasty Video Magazine (Video Team); Players Video Magazine (Players Video/Vivid Raw); Sista (Video Team); Sugar Walls (Dark Side/Elegant Angel); Sweet Honey Buns (West Coast Productions)
Best Gonzo Series	Best Pro-Am or Amateur Series
**Seymore Butts (Seymore Butts Home Movies)**; Anabolic World Sex Tour (Anabolic Video); Assman (Anabolic Video); Ben Dover (HK Video/VCA); Buttman (Evil Angel Productions); Butt Row (All Blew Shirts/Evil Angel); Dirty Dancers (Fallen Angel Entertainment); Fresh Hot Babes (West Coast Productions); Freshman Fantasies (All Good Video); Real Sex Magazine (Legend Video); Shane's World (Odyssey Group Video); Sweet Rides (All Good Video); Up Your Ass (Anabolic Video); The Voyeur (John Leslie/Evil Angel); Wet Cotton Panties (CDi Entertainment Group)	**Up & Cummers (Randy West/Evil Angel)**; Amateurs Only (Fat Dog Productions); Beaver Hunt (Hustler Video/Vivid Raw); The Coeds (Sunny Day Productions); Creme de la Face (Odyssey Group Video); Cum Stoppers (Legend Video); Global Warming Debutantes (Ed Powers Productions); Homegrown Video (Xplor Media Group); Hot Fucking Amateurs (Pleasure Nastiest Moments); More Dirty Debutantes (Ed Powers Productions); Mother Productions (Mother Productions); Private Moments (GRG); Real Life Video (Real Life Video); Slut Search (Tight Ends Productions); Video Virgins (New Sensations)

==== Technical Achievement ====
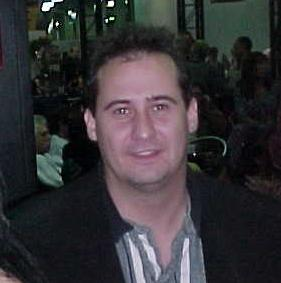
Nic Cramer, Best Director—Film and Best Screenplay—Film winner

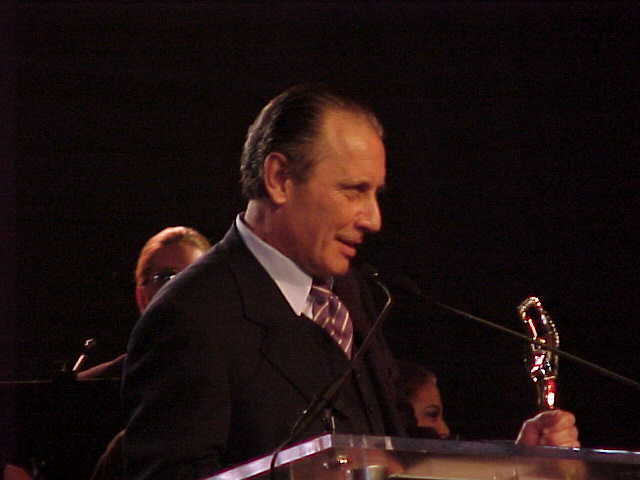
John Leslie accepting his award for Best Director—Video

Best Art Direction—Film	Best Art Direction—Video
**Tatiana**; Delirious; High Heels; Looker; Love's Passion; Mobster's Wife; Phoenix Rising; Shattered Vows	**Pornogothic**; Café Flesh 2; Dark Paradise; Dream Catcher; Eros; Flashpoint; Forever Night; Generation Sex 4; Infinite Bliss; Sexual Species; Skin: Cuntrol; Terrors from the Clit
Best Cinematography	Best Videography
**Jack Remy – Looker**; Andrew Blake – Delirious; Andrew Blake – High Heels; Andrew Blake – Wet; A. C. Fremont – White Angel; Jake Jacobs – The Good, the Bad and the Wicked; Kris Kramski – Models; Ralph Parfait – Mobster's Wife; Ralph Parfait – Motel Blue; Ralph Parfait, Jack Remy – Masseuse 3; Jack Remy – Phoenix Rising; Cyril Yano, Barry Wood – Love's Passion	**(Tie)**: **Jack Remy – Café Flesh 2**; **Barry Wood – Forever Night**; Antony Adams – Planet Sexxx; Tom Elliott – Generation Sex 4; Tashi Gold, Simon Poe – Skin: Cuntrol; Barry Harley, Dino Ninn, Predator – Dream Catcher; Jake Jacobs – Eros; Jake Jacobs – Exile; Jake Jacobs, Jack Remy – Flashpoint; Joone – Rocki Roads' Wet Dreams; Jack Remy – Penitent Flesh; Barry Wood, Predator – Fade to Blue
Best Director—Film	Best Director—Video
**Nic Cramer – Looker**; James Avalon – Carnal Instincts; Veronica Hart – Love's Passion; Kris Kramski – Models; Bud Lee – Appassionata; Paul Thomas – Masseuse 3	**John Leslie – The Lecher 2**; Brad Armstrong – Flashpoint; François Clousot – L.A. Uncovered; Teri Diver, Tom Elliott – Generation Sex 4; Tashi Gold – Skin: Cuntrol; Ernest Greene – Dark Paradise; Jonathan Morgan – Pornogothic; Michael Ninn – Dream Catcher; Antonio Passolini – Café Flesh 2; Jim Powers – Chamber of Whores; Jace Rocker – Thai Me Up; Candida Royalle – One Size Fits All; David Stanley – Turn About; Matt Zane – Lust and Lies; Michael Zen – Taboo 17
Best Director—Foreign	Best Music
**Rocco Siffredi – Rocco Never Dies I & II**; Karel C. – Journey Through My Heart; Christoph Clark – The Temptations of Clarisse; Marc Dorcel – Citizen Shane; Anita Rinaldi – Planet Sexxx; Frank Thring – Broken Dreams; Pierre Woodman – Tatiana 1, 2 & 3'	**Razed in Black – Strange Life: The Breech**; Johnny Toxic, Weed Whore – Action Man; Asia Carrera – Appassionata; Pantisi Sera – Café Flesh 2; Benedictus – The Craving; PPM, Inc. – Depraved Fantasies 5; Lauren Alexander – Dream Catcher; Tom Elliot, Marc Allan, Rook – Generation Sex 4; Raoul Valve – High Heels; Vittorio Worx – Looker; Melvin – Penitent Flesh; The Long Beach Dub All-Stars – Porno Star; Toshi Gold – Skin: Cuntrol; Razed in Black – Strange Life: The Breech; Nine-Inch Male – Welcome to the Cathouse; Ivory Gibson – White Angel
Best Editing—Film	Best Editing—Video
**SCSi Post, Nic Cramer – Looker**; Gabrielle Anex, Phil Leader – White Angel; Andrew Blake – Delirious; Andrew Blake – High Heels; Evan Daniels – Carnal Instincts; Steven Katz – Love's Passion; Kris Kramski – Models; Joe Kurtz – Masseuse 3; Jon Raven, Nic Cramer, Kelly Carpenter – Phoenix Rising; SCSi Post, Nic Cramer – Intimate Strangers; Motel Blue	**Alex Sanders – Bodyslammin': Shake & Tumble**; Keith Brian – Thai Me Up; Tom Byron – Whack Attack 2; Robyn Dyer – Layered; Tom Elliott – Generation Sex 4; Steven Katz – Dream Catcher; Joe Kurtz – Mission Erotica; John Leslie – The Lecher 2; Michael Ninn – Fade to Blue; Antonio Passolini, D-3 – Café Flesh 2; Simon Poe – Skin: Cuntrol; Tom Ponti – Planet Sexxx; Alex Sanders – Bodyslammin' 2: Down & Dirty; SCSi Post – Heartache; Bud Swope – Nude World Order
Best Screenplay—Film	Best Screenplay—Video
**Martin Brimmer, Nic Cramer – Looker**; James Avalon – Carnal Instincts; James Avalon – White Angel; James Avalon, Bella Feege – Red Vibe Diaries 2; A. J. Barber – Mobster's Wife; Asia Carrera – Appassionata; Nic Cramer – Phoenix Rising; Jane Hamilton – Love's Passion; L. Meyers – Party Favors; Raven Touchstone – Debbie Does Dallas: The Next Generation; Neil Wexler – Masseuse 3	**Mark Archer – Barefoot Confidential**; Brad Armstrong – Exile; Brad Armstrong – Heartache; Brad Armstrong, George Kaplan – Flashpoint; Martin Brimmer – No Man's Land 21; Martin Brimmer – Pornogothic; Guillermo Brown – The Neighbor; George Kaplan – Dinner Party at Six; Cash Markman – Contract; Cash Markman – Forbidden; Antonio Passolini – Café Flesh 2; Jim Powers – Chamber of Whores; Jace Rocker – Thai Me Up; Candida Royalle – One Size Fits All; David Stanley – Turn About
Best Special Effects
**Café Flesh 2**; Bodyslammin': Shake & Tumble; Bodyslammin' 2: Down & Dirty; Dream Catcher; Flashpoint; Forever Night; Generation Sex 4; Layered; Phoenix Rising; Terrors from the Clit

=== Achievement Awards ===
==== Breakthrough Award ====
- Alex Sanders

==== Safe Sex Award ====
- One Size Fits All – Femme Productions/Adam & Eve

==== Special Achievement Awards ====
- Larry Flynt, LFP
- Sharon Mitchell, AIM
- Shane, Shane's World
- Eddie Wedelstedt, Goalie Entertainment
- Greg Allan

==== Hall of Fame ====
- Lasse Braun
- Nikki Charm
- Bob Chinn
- Diedre Holland
- Tami Monroe
- Richard Pacheco
- Suze Randall
- Patti Rhodes
- Annie Sprinkle

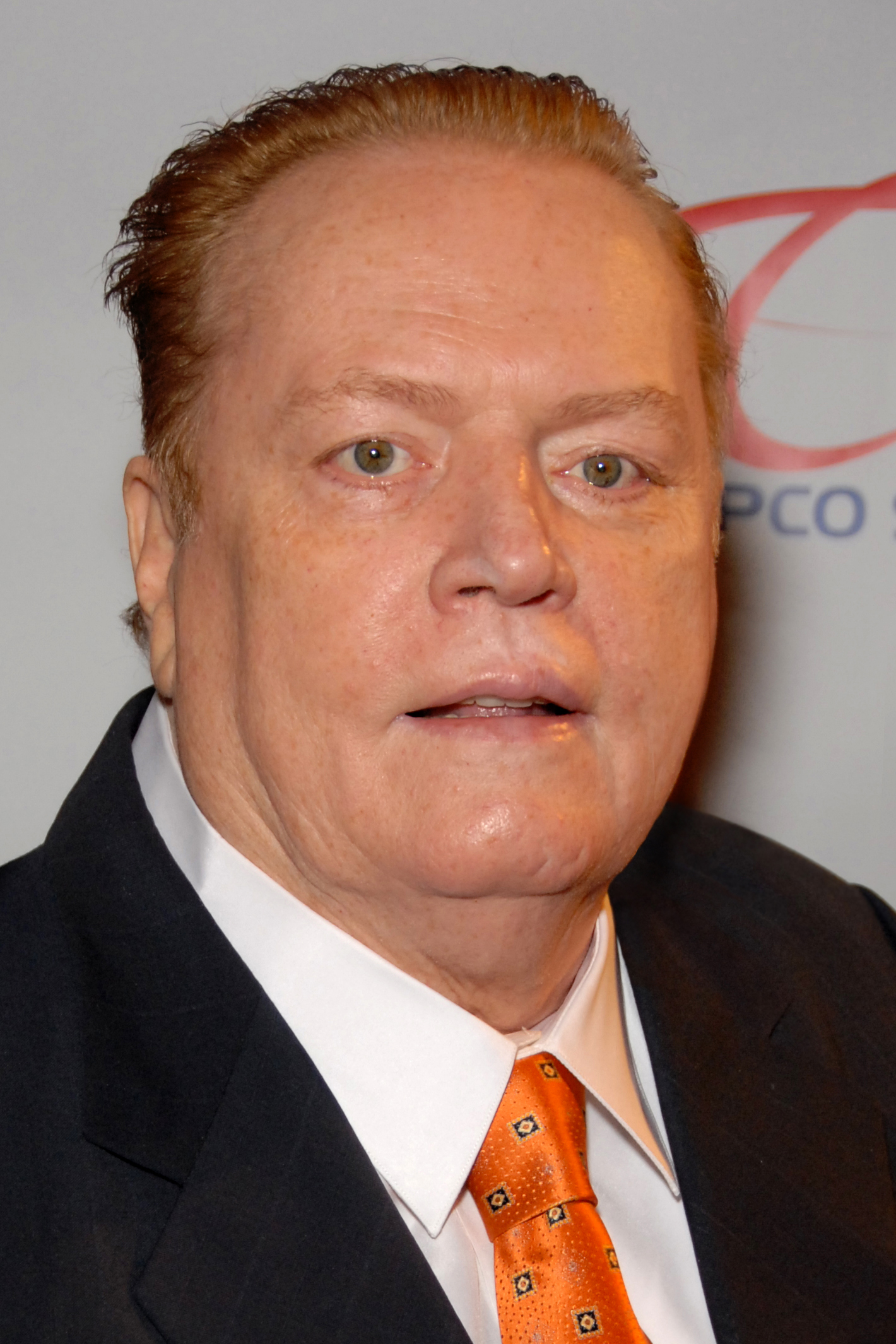
Larry Flynt, Special Achievement Award winner

==== Best-Selling Tape of the Year ====
- Pam & Tommy Lee•Hardcore & Uncensored, S & D Video/IEG

==== Best-Renting Tape of the Year ====
- Pam & Tommy Lee•Hardcore & Uncensored, S & D Video

o/I EG

=== Movies with multiple nominations and awards ===
The following 22 movies received the most nominations:

Nominations	Film
14	Café Flesh 2
13	Models
12	Looker
12	Love's Passion
11	Masseuse 3
11	Phoenix Rising
10	Flashpoint
9	Dream Catcher
9	White Angel
8	Exile
8	Pornogothic
8	Skin: Cuntrol
8	Thai Me Up
7	Appassionata
7	Carnal Instincts
7	Debbie Does Dallas: The Next Generation
7	Mobster's Wife
6	Forever Night
6	Generation Sex 4
6	Nude World Order
6	One Size Fits All
6	Turn About

The following 11 movies received multiple awards:

Awards	Film
6	Looker
4	Café Flesh 2
3	Tushy Heaven
2	Euro Angels 10
2	Forever Night
2	Masseuse 3
2	Models
2	Pornogothic
2	The Pornographer
2	Strange Life: The Breech
2	Tatiana 1

== Presenters and Performers ==
The following individuals presented awards or performed musical numbers.

=== Presenters ===
Presenters

Name(s)	Role
Jewel De'Nyle; Azlea Antistea	The Trophy Girls
Christi Lake; Misty; Randy Spears; Danielle Rogers	Presenters of the All-Girl Sex Scene—Video award
Kylie Ireland; Stacy Valentine; Jill Kelly	Presenters of the All-Girl Sex Scene—Film award
Jeanna Fine	Presenter of the Best Supporting Actor—Film award
Smally Pauly (The Howard Stern Show); Tina Tyler; Coral Sands	Presenters of the Best Couples Sex Scene—Video award
David Chryso (Hot Vidéo); Laure Sainclair; Oceane	Presenters of the Hot Video Award
Paul Fishbein (AVN Publisher)	Presenter of a Special Achievement award
Jenna Jameson	Presenter of the Breakthrough Award Award
Al Goldstein (Screw publisher)	Presenter of the first five Hall of Fame awards
Chloe; Ruby; Liz Leighton; Rocki Roads; Stryc-9; Crystal Knight	Presenters of the Best Group Sex Scenes awards
Jenteal {{{last}}} Lori Michaels; Taylor Hayes; Taylor St. Claire; Raquel DeVine; Ian Daniels	Presenters of the Best Supporting Actor—Video award
Janine Lindemulder	Presenter of the Best Selling and Renting Tapes awards
Jane Hamilton	Presenter of the last four Hall of Fame awards
Paul Fishbein (AVN Publisher); Vince Vouyer; Christopher Alexander (Anabolic Video)	Presenters of additional Special Achievement awards
Johnni Black (1998 Best New Starlet)	Presenter of the AVN Best New Starlet Award
Ron Jeremy; Candida Royalle; Houston; Claudia Chase; Holly Body; Alexandra Silk	Presenters of the Best Actor—Video and Best Actress—Video awards
Raylene; Marylin Star; Tonisha Mills; Nina Hartley; Julian St. Jox	Presenters of the Best Actor—Film and Best Actress—Film awards
Dee (actress); Misty Rain; Lexus	Presenters of the Male Performer of the Year award
Sean Michaels (pornographic actor); Jonathan Morgan; Kyle Stone	Presenters of the AVN Female Performer of the Year Award
Melanie Stone; Lauren Montgomery; Nikki Lynn	Presenters of the Best Video Feature award
Marilyn Chambers; Tony Tedeschi; Juli Ashton	Presenters of the Best Video Feature award

=== Performers ===
Performers

Name(s)	Role	Performed
AVN Orchestra	Performers	Orchestral
World Modeling Dancers	Performers	"Naked Choices"
Wild Side Girls	Performers	Bump-and-grind routine
John Leslie (pornographic actor)	Performers	"One More Before I Go"
Rich Williams	Performers	Bill Clinton impersonator
Ed Powers	Performers	"Swing That Thing"

== Ceremony information ==
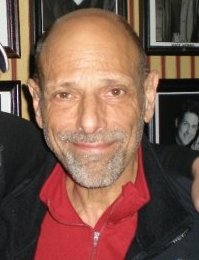
Robert Schimmel hosted the 16th AVN Awards.

For 1999, "a decision was made to reinstate the mainstream portion of the technical awards et al. in one evening's presentation" because for the first time, awards for gay movie categories were split off into a new event, the GayVN Awards, which were held a month earlier. Previously, technical and some other categories were presented separately from the awards show; with them included, the 1999 show ran four hours.

Gary Miller was producer of the show and comedian Robert Schimmel was selected for a second consecutive stint as host. Several other people participated in the production of the ceremony and its related events. Mark Stone served as musical director for the festivities. John Leslie, who won his fourth Best Director statuette at the event, and who led a blues band in his spare time, performed a self-composed song as one of the musical performers.

The award show kicked off with presentation of the Best Couples Sex Scene—Film award, with the winners announced as Stephanie Swift and Jon Dough. Erotic X-Film Guide magazine reported this was a faux pas: "Stephanie went to the podium to get her award and swore that she did not have sex with Jon Dough in the video. In fact, it was true and was a misprint in the program."

=== Box office performance of nominees ===
The Pam & Tommy Lee • Hardcore & Uncensored celebrity sex tape won the awards for Best Selling Tape and Best Renting Tape, presented to Steven Hirsch on behalf of S&D Video and IEG.

=== Critical reviews ===
The show received a mixed reception from sex publications. Hustler magazine reported, "Accused of rigging its voting process to favor its advertisers in the past, Adult Video News's judges restored luster to the proceedings this year by bestowing awards to deserving nominees." However, the magazine noted co-host Klass managed "to shock the ceremony's seen-it-all, heard-it-all organizers by repeatedly expressing her fondness for" anal sex.

Erotic X-Film Guide was critical of the show's length: "We realized this was indeed the longest and most drawn out show AVN had ever produced. As much as the industry likes to pat itself on the back and as much as we love AVN for giving us the porn equivalent of the Oscars, the show must go on. But only if it's edited with a merciless sword. Something must be done to make one of the most anticipated nights in porn not be one of the most dreaded."

== See also ==
- AVN Awards
- AVN Best New Starlet Award
- AVN Award for Male Performer of the Year
- AVN Award for Male Foreign Performer of the Year
- AVN Female Performer of the Year Award
- List of members of the AVN Hall of Fame
- 1999 GayVN Awards
- 1998 in film
- 71st Academy Awards
