= Flashpoint =

Flashpoint or flash point may refer to:

- Flash point, the lowest temperature at which a liquid forms a flammable vapor

== Arts and media ==
=== Film ===
- Flashpoint (1972 film), Australian film starring Serge Lazareff
- Flashpoint (1984 film), starring Kris Kristofferson
- Flashpoint (1998 film), adult film starring Jenna Jameson
- Flash Point (film), 2007 film starring Donnie Yen and Louis Koo
- Justice League: The Flashpoint Paradox, 2013 superhero film
- The Flash, a superhero film with The Flash, and taking influence from the Flashpoint comic book storyline.

=== Music ===
- Flashpoint (album), 1991 album by the Rolling Stones
- Flashpoint (soundtrack), 1984 album by Tangerine Dream
- "Flashpoint", 1995 song by Fear Factory from Demanufacture
- Flashpoint Music, Australian music publisher
- Flashpoint (band), American jazz group
- Flashpoint (rock band), American hard rock band
- "Flashpoint", song and concert by ReGLOSS

=== Print ===
- Operation Flashpoint, a 1970 novel in the Drake series by Dan J. Marlowe
- Flash Point (Gilbert novel), a 1974 novel by Michael Gilbert
- Flash Point (Bentley novel), a 2023 novel by Don Bentley
- Flashpoint, a 1976 novel by George LaFountaine; basis for the 1984 film
- Flashpoint, a 1980 S.S. Wotan novel by Leo Kessler
- Flashpoint, a 1981 novel by Jane Donnelly
- Flash Point, a 1988 SuperBolan novel by Charlie McDade, writing as Don Pendleton
- Flashpoint, a 1994 novel by Katherine V. Forrest
- London's Burning: Flashpoint, a 1995 novel based on the TV series by John Burke
- Flashpoint, a 1999 Carlotta Carlyle novel by Linda Barnes
- Flashpoint (Elseworlds), a 1999 comic book series
- Flashpoint, a 2001 BattleTech novel by Loren L. Coleman
- Flashpoints, a 2002 non-fiction book by Steve Arterburn and Angela Elwell Hunt
- Flashpoint, a 2004 Troubleshooters novel by Suzanne Brockmann
- Flashpoint, a 2007 Ben Maddox novel by Bernard Ashley
- Flashpoint, a 2008 American Heroes novel by Jill Shalvis
- Flashpoint (comics), a 2011 comic book series
- Starcraft II: Flashpoint, a 2012 Starcraft novel by Christie Golden
- Flashpoint, a 2013 Dev Conrad novel by Ed Gorman
- Flashpoint (Korman novel), the fourth and last book in the Unstoppable series, a 2014 novel by George Korman
- Flashpoint, a 2024 FBI Thriller novel by Catherine Coulter

=== Television ===
- Flashpoint (TV series), 2008–2012 Canadian crime series
- Flashpoint (Australian TV program), produced by Seven Network
- FlashPoint (Christian TV program)
- "Flashpoint", sixth episode of the 1964 Doctor Who serial The Dalek Invasion of Earth
- "Flashpoint" (Falcon Crest), a 1986 episode
- "Flashpoint" (The Flash episode), first episode of the third season of The Flash series
- "Flashpoint", a second-season episode of Justice League Unlimited

=== Other media ===
- Flashpoints (radio program) a 2001 news program from Berkeley, California
- Operation Flashpoint, series of military simulation computer games since 2001
- Flash Point: Fire Rescue, a 2011 Kevin Lanzing board game
- Flashpoint Archive, an online preservation project primarily focused on Adobe Flash
