= Bud Lee =

Bud Lee may refer to:

- Bud Lee (photographer) (1941-2015), American photojournalist
- Bud Lee (pornographer) (born 1955), American adult film director
