= Reel People =

Reel People may refer to:

- Reel people, an ethnic group of South Sudan
- Reel People (film), a 1984 pornographic movie directed by Anthony Spinelli
