= Rhonda Jo Petty =

American pornographic actress (born 1955)

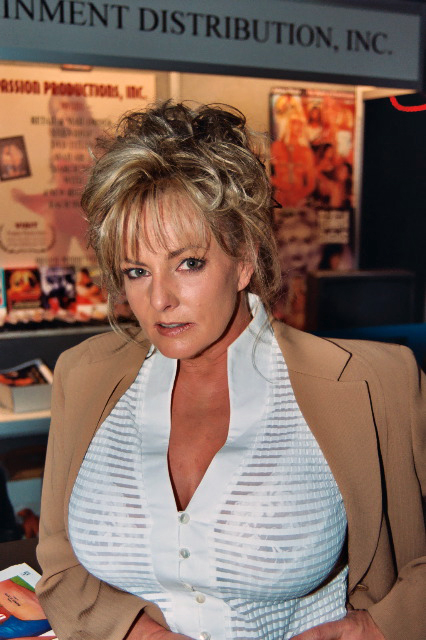
- Petty at the 2003 Adult Entertainment Expo
- Born: March 30, 1955 (age 71); North Hollywood, Los Angeles, U.S.
- Other names: Sarah Dawcett; Ronda Jo; Ronda Jo Petty
- Occupation: Pornographic actress
- Height: 5 ft 5 in (1.65 m)
- Spouse: Rocky Lowstetter

Rhonda Jo Petty (born March 30, 1955) is an American pornographic actress. She is a member of the AVN Hall of Fame and the XRCO Hall of Fame.

== Known life and known career ==
Petty was born in North Hollywood, California and raised in Chatsworth, California. Her first lead role was in Disco Lady, released in 1978, due to her physical resemblance to the at-the-time popular mainstream actress Farrah Fawcett. (She was, indeed, promoted as "the Farrah Fawcett look-alike," which was also a marketing point of Little Orphan Dusty, released at the same approximate time.) Suitably, another of her stage names, "Sarah Dawcett," traded off on that resemblance. However, Petty had obviously larger breasts than did the real Fawcett—a physical aspect the "look-alike" promotion glossed over.

Petty was popular because she was unique in the industry for her time during the 1970s; she shaved her private parts and she often took part in then unconventional fisting scenes; three times in Little Orphan Dusty alone. She performed in numerous films with early porn icon John Holmes, in addition to performing often in lesbian scenes. Her career was at its height in the late 1970s and the early to middle 1980s.

Petty starred in the film which debuted Holmes's future wife, Laurie Rose, who was then using the stage name Misty Dawn; this was The Greatest Little Cathouse in Las Vegas, released in 1982. Petty "became one of [Laurie's] favorite actresses for the longest time."

The Internet Adult Film Database notes that Petty brought her adult-film career to a close in 1991.
