= Lynn LeMay =

American pornographic actress (born 1961)

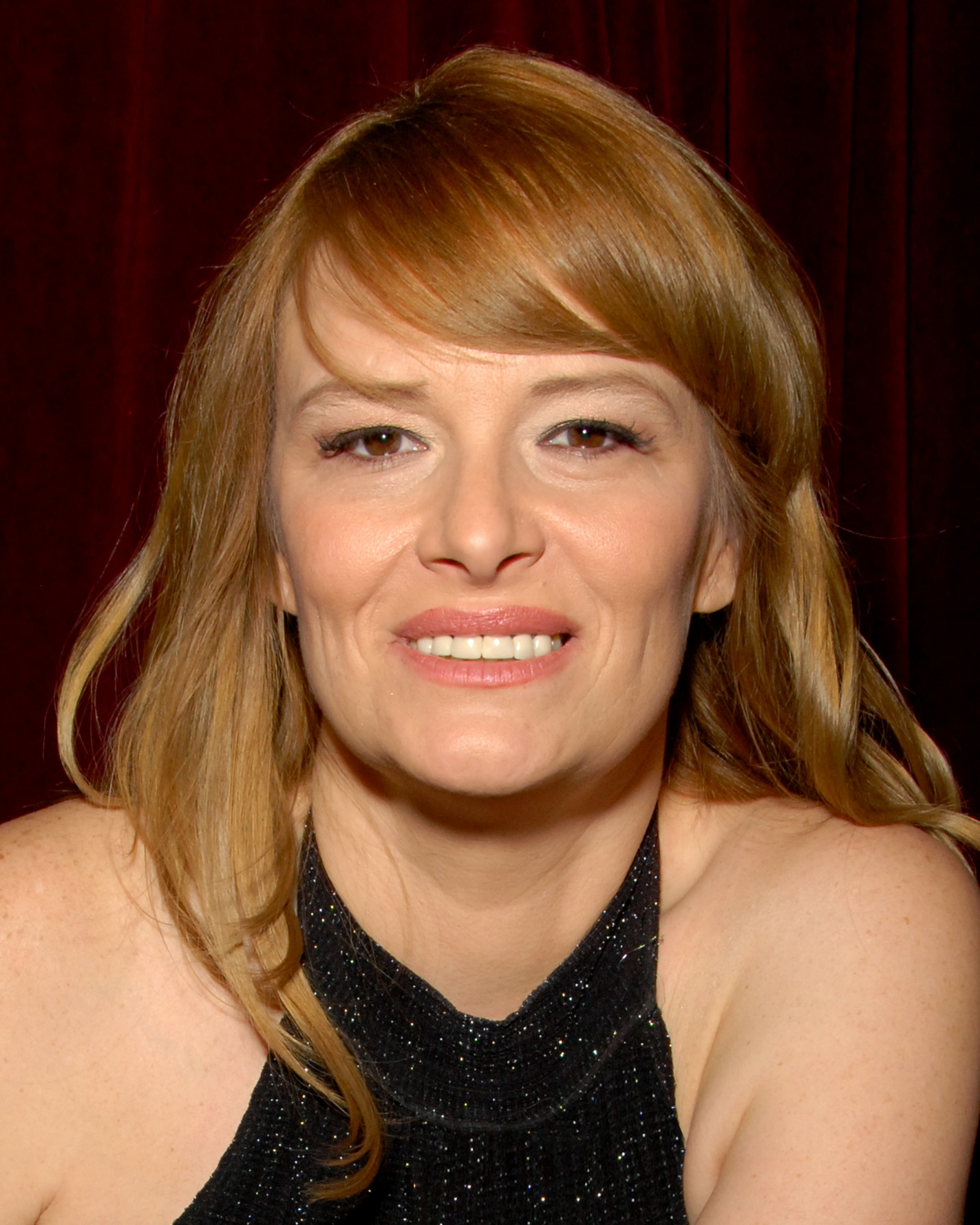
- Lynn LeMay attending the XRCO Awards in Hollywood on 17 April 2009
- Born: 1 December 1961 (age 64); Tacoma, Washington, U.S.
- Other names: Lynn Lamay; Lynn Lymay
- Occupation: Pornographic actress
- Height: 5 ft 10 in (1.78 m)

Lynn LeMay (born December 1, 1961) is an American pornographic actress. She was also a featured dancer in the U.S. and Europe. In fall 2006, she founded the adult production company LeMayzing Pictures.

== Awards ==
- 1989 XRCO Award - Best Female/Female Sex Scene for The Kink (with Porsche Lynn)
- 2006 AVN Hall of Fame inductee
- 2011 XRCO Hall of Fame inductee
