= List of members of the XRCO Hall of Fame =

The XRCO Hall of Fame lists well-known adult entertainment works and workers. The list is managed by X-Rated Critics Organization and inducted annually during the XRCO Awards. The first XRCO Awards were presented in Hollywood on February 14, 1985. Inductees must have been industry members for at least ten years.

Members are listed in the order that they were inducted, with the year they were inducted, if known:

== Actors ==
- 1985: John C. Holmes
- 1985: Harry Reems
- 1985: Jamie Gillis
- 1985: Eric Edwards
- 1985: John Leslie
- 1986: Paul Thomas
- 1988: Herschel Savage
- 1989: Jon Martin
- 1990: Joey Silvera
- 1990: Randy West
- 1991: Ron Jeremy
- 1992: Mike Horner
- 1993: Tom Byron
- 1993: Marc Wallice
- 1995: Peter North
- 1996: Buck Adams
- 1997: Don Fernando
- 1999: Steve Drake
- 2000: Sean Michaels
- 2000: T.T. Boy
- 2001: Rocco Siffredi
- 2001: Jake Steed
- 2002: Billy Dee
- 2003: Randy Spears
- 2006: Mark Davis
- 2006: Jon Dough
- 2006: Blake Palmer
- 2007: Mr. Marcus
- 2007: Steven St. Croix
- 2008: Christoph Clark
- 2009: Lexington Steele
- 2010: Evan Stone
- 2010: Erik Everhard
- 2011: Manuel Ferrara
- 2011: Dave Cummings
- 2012: Vince Vouyer
- 2014: Mark Wood
- 2014: Tony Montana

== Actresses ==
- 1985: Georgina Spelvin
- 1985: Tina Russell
- 1985: Rene Bond
- 1985: Marilyn Chambers
- 1985: Sharon Thorpe
- 1986: Annette Haven
- 1987: Leslie Bovee
- 1988: Sharon Mitchell
- 1988: Colleen Brennan
- 1989: Sharon Kane
- 1989: Gloria Leonard
- 1990: Kay Parker
- 1990: Suzanne McBain
- 1991: Seka
- 1991: Veronica Hart
- 1991: Erica Boyer
- 1992: Vanessa del Rio
- 1993: Desireé Cousteau
- 1993: Lisa De Leeuw
- 1994: Hyapatia Lee
- 1994: Debi Diamond
- 1995: Shanna McCullough
- 1995: Ginger Lynn
- 1995: Christy Canyon
- 1996: Amber Lynn
- 1996: Nina Hartley
- 1997: Desiree West
- 1997: Jeanna Fine
- 1998: Bionca
- 1998: Careena Collins
- 1999: Kelly Nichols
- 1999: Annie Sprinkle
- 1999: Barbara Dare
- 1999: Jessie St. James
- 1999: Shauna Grant
- 1999: Linda Wong
- 2000: Tori Welles
- 2000: Tracey Adams
- 2001: Porsche Lynn
- 2002: Teri Weigel
- 2003: Ashlyn Gere
- 2003: Tiffany Mynx
- 2004: Selena Steele
- 2005: Jenna Jameson
- 2006: Keisha
- 2006: Kylie Ireland
- 2007: Francesca Lé
- 2007: Janine
- 2007: Serenity
- 2008: Chloe
- 2008: Nikki Dial
- 2008: Shayla LaVeaux
- 2008: Jeannie Pepper
- 2008: Stephanie Swift
- 2009: Jewel De'Nyle
- 2009: Angel Kelly
- 2009: Leena La Bianca
- 2009: Missy
- 2009: Joanna Storm
- 2009: Stacy Valentine
- 2010: Sunset Thomas
- 2010: Inari Vachs
- 2010: Nikki Charm
- 2011: Rayveness
- 2011: Tricia Devereaux
- 2011: Jessica Drake
- 2011: Lynn LeMay
- 2011: Juli Ashton
- 2011: Aurora Snow
- 2012: Julia Ann
- 2012: Jenna Haze
- 2012: Jesse Jane
- 2013: Belladonna
- 2013: Lisa Ann
- 2013: Alexandra Silk
- 2014: Tera Patrick
- 2014: Stormy Daniels
- 2014: Taylor Wane
- 2015: Houston
- 2015: Melissa Hill
- 2015: Karen Summer
- 2016: Briana Banks
- 2016: Hillary Scott
- 2017: Raylene
- 2018: Alexis Texas
- 2019: Alana Evans
- 2019: Phoenix Marie
- 2019: Brandi Love
- 2020: Angela White
- 2020: Asa Akira
- 2020: Kaitlyn Ashley
- 2020: Tori Black
- 2021: Ashley Blue
- 2021: India Summer
- 2021: Katie Morgan
- 2021: Long Jeanne Silver
- 2021: Riley Reid
- 2021: Sunny Lane
- 2022: Dana DeArmond
- 2022: Heather Hunter
- 2022: Kayden Kross
- 2023: Natasha Nice
- 2023: Sasha Grey
- 2023: Tanya Tate
- 2024: Celeste
- 2024: Felecia
- 2024: Kagney Linn Karter
- 2024: Lexi Belle
- 2024: Misty Stone
- 2025: Brittany Andrews
- 2026: Domonique Simone
- 2026: Tiffany Million

== Directors ==
- 2013: Jonathan Morgan
- 2014: Axel Braun
- 2015: Stoney Curtis

== Fifth Estate ==
Auxiliary Fields

- 1994: Reb Sawitz
- 1994: Al Goldstein
- 1994: William Rotsler
- 1995: John Rowberry
- 1996: Jim South
- 1996: Larry Flynt
- 1997: Jared Rutter
- 1998: Jeremy Stone
- 2003: Susie Bright
- 2005: Bill Liebowitz
- 2005: Jim Holliday
- 2006: Doug Oliver
- 2006: Danni Ashe
- 2007: Mark Kernes
- 2008: Paul Fishbein
- 2009: Roger T. Pipe
- 2012: Denny Recob (cavr.com)
- 2012: Tristan Taormino

== Film Creators ==
- 1985: David F. Friedman
- 1985: Gerard Damiano
- 1985: Radley Metzger (Henry Paris)
- 1986: Alex de Renzy
- 1986: Anthony Spinelli
- 1986: Howard Ziehm (Linus Gator)
- 1987: Bob Chinn (director)
- 1987: Harold Lime (producer)
- 1988: The Mitchell Brothers
- 1988: Cecil Howard
- 1989: Henri Pachard
- 1989: Robert McCallum
- 1990: Erik Anderson
- 1991: Chuck Vincent
- 1994: F. J. Lincoln
- 1994: Bobby Hollander
- 1994: Bruce Seven
- 1995: John Stagliano
- 1996: Gregory Dark
- 1997: Michael Carpenter
- 1998: Candida Royalle
- 1999: Ed Powers
- 2000: Damon Christian
- 2001: Patrick Collins
- 2001: Jim Enright
- 2002: Kirdy Stevens
- 2003: Andrew Blake
- 2004: Seymore Butts
- 2004: James Avalon
- 2006: Michael Ninn
- 2007: Rinse Dream
- 2008: Richard Mahler
- 2008: Suze Randall
- 2009: Brad Armstrong
- 2009: Jules Jordan
- 2012: Miles Long
- 2012: Luc Wylder
- 2013: Christian Mann
- 2013: Rodney Moore

== Film Pioneers ==
- Prior to 1989: Serena
- Prior to 1989: Darby Lloyd Rains
- 1989: George S. McDonald
- 1989: Sandi Carey
- 1989: Sandy Dempsey
- 1989: Ric Lutze
- 1989: Jesse Adams
- 1989: C. J. Laing
- 1989: Cyndee Summers
- 1989: Johnny Keyes
- 1989: Richard Mailer
- 1989: William Margold
- 1990: Bob Vosse
- 1994: John Seeman
- 1994: David Christopher
- 1994: Michael Morrison
- 1997: Titus Moody
- 1999: Roy Karch
- 1999: Jim Malibu
- 1999: Juliet Anderson
- 1999: Bobby Astyr
- 1999: George Payne
- 2001: Dean Roberson
- 2005: Jared Rutter
- 2006: Richard Pacheco
- 2007: Loni Sanders
- 2007: Mai Lin
- 2008: R. Bolla
- 2008: Abigail Clayton
- 2008: Marc Stevens
- 2008: Lysa Thatcher
- 2009: Kandi Barbour
- 2010: Mike Ranger
- 2012: Rhonda Jo Petty
- 2014: Brigitte Lahaie
- 2016: Constance Money

== Films (with year of release) ==
- 1985: Deep Throat (1972)
- 1985: Behind the Green Door (1972)
- 1985: The Opening of Misty Beethoven (1976)
- 1986: The Private Afternoons of Pamela Mann (1974)
- 1986: Story of Joanna (1975)
- 1986: Honeypie (1976)
- 1987: The Devil in Miss Jones (1973)
- 1987: Sensations (1975)
- 1988: Femmes de Sade (1976)
- 1988: Naked Came the Stranger (1975)
- 1989: Wet Rainbow (1974)
- 1989: 3 A.M. (1976)
- 1989: Desires Within Young Girls (1977)
- 1989: Barbara Broadcast (1977)
- 1989: The Other Side of Julie (1978)
- 1989: Take Off (1978)
- 1989: Candy Stripers (1978)
- 1989: Sex World (1978)
- 1989: Easy (1979)
- 1990: Babylon Pink (1979)
- 1990: The Ecstasy Girls (1979)
- 1990: Pretty Peaches (1978)
- 1990: Eruption (1977)
- 1991: Baby Face (1977)
- 1991: Jack & Jill (1979)
- 1991: Insatiable (1980)
- 1991: Talk Dirty to Me (1980)
- 1992: Nightdreams (1981)
- 1992: Nothing to Hide (1981)
- 1992: Randy the Electric Lady (1980)
- 1993: Café Flesh (1982)
- 1993: Outlaw Ladies (1981)
- 1993: Platinum Paradise (1981)
- 1994: All American Girls (1982)
- 1994: Roommates (1981)
- 1994: Sexcapades (1983)
- 1995: Bad Girls (1981)
- 1995: Every Woman Has a Fantasy (1984)
- 1995: Firestorm (1984)
- 1996: New Wave Hookers (1985)
- 1996: Night Hunger (1983)
- 1997: Taboo (1980)
- 1997: Little Girls Blue (1978)
- 1997: Taboo American-Style (1985)
- 1998: Dangerous Stuff (1985)
- 1998: White Bun Busters (1986)
- 1998: Loose Ends (1985)
- 1998: Mary! Mary! (1977)
- 1998: Dixie Ray Hollywood Star (1983)
- 1999: Her Name Was Lisa (1979)
- 1999: Aerobisex Girls (1983)
- 2001: Obsessed (1977)
- 2001: The Catwoman (1988)
- 2001: Buttman's Ultimate Workout (1990)
- 2001: The Chameleon (1989)
- 2001: Hot Pursuit (1983)
- 2002: The Big Thrill (1989)
- 2002: Night Trips (1989)
- 2003: The Dancers (1981)
- 2003: Wild Goose Chase (1991)
- 2003: Chameleons – Not The Sequel (1992)
- 2004: Amanda By Night (1981)
- 2004: Buttman's European Vacation (1991)
- 2004: Black Throat (1985)
- 2005: No films inducted.
- 2006: Face Dance Parts I, II (1993)
- 2006: Justine – Nothing to Hide II (1994)
- 2006: Neon Nights (1981)
- 2007: Latex (1995 – Michael Ninn – VCA)
- 2008: Reel People (1984)
- 2008: Curse of the Catwoman (1992)
- 2009: Dog Walker (1994)
- 2010: Whispered Lies (1993)
- 2011: No films inducted.
- 2012: No films inducted.
- 2013: The Fashionistas (2002)
- 2014: Slave To Love (1993)

== Outlaws of Porn ==
- 2009: Max Hardcore

== Paladin Awards ==
"This unique special-achievement award is given periodically by the XRCO to acknowledge companies or individuals who have gone the extra distance for the adult-film industry."

- 1989: Director Anthony Spinelli for Portrait of an Affair, one of the few 35-mm films released in 1988.
- 1989: Arrow Film and Video for innovating the highly successful and widely copied "sell through" marketing program.
- 1990: Caballero Home Video for cinematic excellence in continuing to produce big-budget 35-mm films such as The Nicole Stanton
- 1990: Film editor Jim McReeding (Taboo American Style 1-4) for superior film and video editing throughout his career
- 1990: Hustler Hard video director Jean-Pierre Ferrand for sustained quality as a director
- 1990: Porn veteran Eric Edwards for becoming the industry's first four-decade performer (1960s–90s)

== Special awards ==
- 1995: Michael Cates (for achievement in videography, cinematography, and editing)
- 1995: Carl Esser (in memoriam)
- 2007: Anna Malle (in memoriam)
- 2007: Christi Lake (actress, director, industry supporter)
- 2008: H. Lewis Sirkin (for excellence in free speech and First Amendment cases and litigation)
- 2010: Phil Harvey – Adam & Eve Pictures – 1st Amendment
- 2011: Peter van Aarle

== XRCO Members' Choice ==
- 2007: Asia Carrera
