= Terrors from the Clit =

- DVD released by Extreme Associates
- Directed by: Slain Wayne
- Written by: Slain Wayne
- Story by: Slain Wayne
- Based on: Tales from the Crypt by William Gaines and Steven Dodd
- Produced by: Robert Black
- Starring: Elle DeVyne; Kelly Dean; Lizzy Borden; Erica Lockett; Porsha; Intrusion; Nikki Love
- Edited by: Igor Jerkovsky
- Music by: The Mad Scientist Club
- Production company: Extreme Associates
- Distributed by: Extreme Associates
- Release date: 1998
- Running time: 97 minutes
- Country: United States
- Language: English

Terrors from the Clit is a 1998 American pornographic comedy horror film written and directed by Slain Wayne and produced and distributed by Extreme Associates. An anthology film that contains zombies, vampires, and Frankenstein's monsters, Terrors from the Clit is hosted by Dukey Flyswatter and is the first installment in a series, having been followed by a 2000 sequel titled Terrors from the Clit 2. It stars Elle DeVyne, Kelly Dean, Lizzy Borden, Erica Lockett, Porsha, Intrusion, and Nikki Love.

== Plot ==
The film's five segments are hosted by the cross-dressing, pun-spewing Clit Master.

- "Porno Flick From Hell": A hippie couple on the set of an initially silent 1970s pornographic film is terrorized by the Devil Man. Unimpressed by the male performer, the Devil Man dissolves the actor's penis after the man gives a facial to the female performer, who then has sex with the Devil Man.
- "Night of the Living Head": In a cemetery, a couple is attacked by zombies, who kill the man before giving chase to the woman, Kelly. The zombies follow Kelly into an empty mansion, where they become inert after having sex with Kelly.
- "Vampire Lustiness": A pair of strippers are hired to entertain at a bachelor party in a secluded mansion, but the party consists of only two men, both of whom are revealed to be vampires after the strippers find body parts in a closet and ineffectually shoot one of the "bachelors." The strippers have sex with and are turned into vampires by the "bachelors."
- "Sexy Stitches": Doctor Freakstein has opened a new practice in a hospital, which a pair of laboratory assistants sneak into, discovering that Freakstein has used stolen human body parts to assemble a "Freakstein's Monster." The assistants end up having a threesome with the Freakstein's Monster.
- "One for the Road": Two robbers pick up a female hitchhiker, whom they have sex with before one of the thieves shoots the woman, who keeps coming back no matter how many times the robbers kill her as they flee to Mexico.

== Cast ==
- Dukey Flyswatter as The Clit Master
- Elle DeVyne as Porno Chick
- Van Damage as Porno Dude/Zombie #1/Dr. Freakstein
- Tom Byron as Devil Man
- Kelly Dean as Kelly
- Charles Dahmer as Kelly's Fiancée
- Michael Stefano as Zombie #2/Freakstein's Monster/Bachelor #1
- Lizzy Borden as Party Girl #1
- Erika Lockett as Party Girl #2
- Chris Cannon as Bachelor #2
- Intrusion as Lab Assistant #1
- Porsha as Lab Assistant #2
- Byron Long as Robber #1
- Tony Everready as Robber #2
- Nikki Love as Hitchhiker

== Production ==
Terrors from the Clit was the first pornographic film shot by director Slain Wayne. According to Wayne, the film's producer and cameraman, Rob Black, would abruptly leave the set mid-shoot to deal with the fallout of a breakup with his girlfriend, while an HIV/AIDS outbreak caused by Marc Wallice made performers "hard to cast" and resulted in "a lot of no-shows" because condoms were not used at Extreme Associates. According to actress Lizzy Borden, her sex scene partner, Chris Cannon, ejaculated prematurely in her anus, so Tom Byron had to fill in as a stunt cock to give a facial to Borden.

== Reception ==
AVN praised the film, giving it a score of 4½ out of 5 and writing, "Think of it as a XXX-rated GWAR show, with all of the tongue-in-cheek sensibilities and cheesy effects you'd expect from such a glorious event." Conversely, Peter van Aarle of Cyberspace Adult Video Reviews expressed distaste for Terrors from the Clit, giving it a grade of 7.20 on a scale of 6.00/10.00 and concluding, "More weirdness from Rob Black. This is the type of stuff that will some day come back to haunt the porn industry!"

Terrors from the Clit was nominated for Best Comedy, Best Special Effects, and Best Art Direction (Video) at the 16th AVN Awards, where Dukey Flyswatter was also nominated for Best Non-Sex Performance (Film or Video) for his role as the Clit Master. The film was also the subject of a satirical 1999 article by The Onion titled "Ironic Porn Purchase Leads To Unironic Ejaculation."
