= Porsche Lynn =

American pornographic film actress

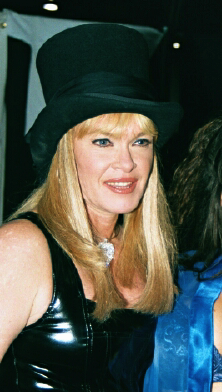
- Lynn in 2002
- Occupation: Pornographic film actress

Porsche Lynn is an American pornographic film actress.

== Career ==
Lynn chose her stage name from the Porsche car company after seeing one of their cars during a drive to one of her earliest film shoots; she added "Lynn" to it as it fitted well.

Between 1985 and 2002, Lynn appeared in about 170 adult films. Lynn is a member of the AVN Hall of Fame and the XRCO Hall of Fame.

Since 2002 Lynn has been the head mistress at a BDSM club in Scottsdale, AZ.

== Awards ==
- 1988 XRCO Award - Starlet of the Year
- 1989 XRCO Award - Best Female/Female Sex Scene for The Kink (with Lynn LeMay)
- 1994 AVN Award - Best Supporting Actress - Video for Servin' it Up
- 1996 Free Speech Coalition - Lifetime Achievement Award
- 2003 Porn Block of Fame

== Books ==
The Girl with the Million Dollar Legs: My Life in Burlesque, Porn and Kink (2014).
