= Billy Glide =

American pornographic actor (1970–2014)

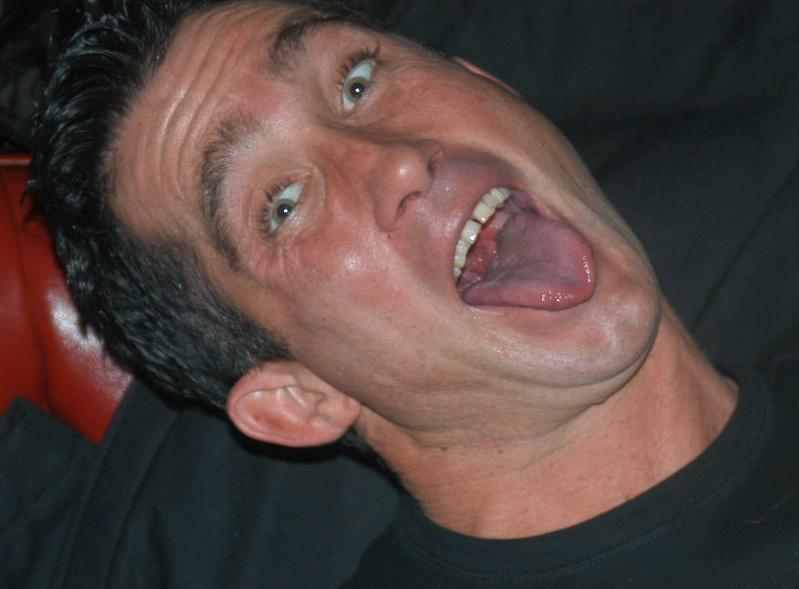
- Glide in 2005
- Born: Tad Douglas Nolen; July 25, 1970; Los Angeles, California, U.S.
- Died: May 24, 2014 (aged 43); Huntington Beach, California, U.S.
- Height: 6 ft 2 in (1.88 m)

Billy Glide (born Tad Douglas Nolen; July 25, 1970 – May 24, 2014) was a pornographic actor. He began appearing in adult films around 1995 and appeared in over 1300 movies.

== Personal life ==
Billy Glide was born Tad Douglas Nolen in Los Angeles, California, United States. He started his career in 1995. Nolen died on 24 May 2014 in Huntington Beach, California. It was initially reported that he had been bitten by a rattlesnake while helping a friend move, and had refused medical treatment. However, it was later confirmed that although he had suffered a venomous bite, the actual cause of death was alcohol intoxication. Glide never married but left behind a daughter at the time of his death.

Glide was posthumously inducted into the AVN Hall of Fame in 2015.

== Awards ==
- 1999 AVN Award winner – Best Group Sex Scene, Film – The Masseuse 3
- 2015 AVN Hall of Fame inductee.
