= Patrick Collins (director) =

American pornographic actor, producer, and director

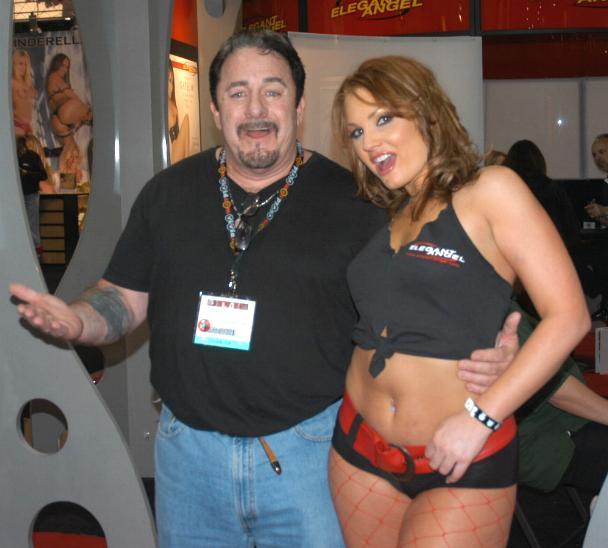
- Collins with Flower Tucci at Adult Entertainment Expo 2007
- Other names: Roscoe Bowltree
- Occupations: Pornographic film producer and director
- Spouse(s): Tianna (div. 1995) Nicole Lace (m. 1996; div. 2015)

Patrick Collins was an American pornographic film producer and director, who is the former owner of Elegant Angel Productions. Collins is a member of the AVN Hall of Fame and the XRCO Hall of Fame.

== Adult film career ==
Collins worked in sales before his career in the adult film industry when he joined Evil Angel Productions in 1989 as a sales manager at the behest of owner John Stagliano. They then founded Elegant Angel Productions (1990) as a subsidiary of Evil Angel and earned himself the moniker of the Collinator (male genitals that have greater girth than with length) from his adult film acting roles. In 1992, Collins had his industry directorial debut Buttwoman Does Budapest; followed by Tianna's Hungarian Connection. In 1996, Collins would later take Elegant Angel independent.

Collins was inducted into the XRCO XRCO Hall of Fame in 2000 and was inducted into the Adult Video News Hall of Fame in 2002. In 2003, Arena magazine listed him at fourteenth on the "50 Most Powerful People in Porn" list.

In January 2015, Patrick Collins decided to leave the adult industry and sold his half of Elegant Angel. His ex-wife, retains ownership.

== Copyright infringement litigation ==
Between September 2010 and September 2012, Patrick Collins Inc. filed suit against approximately 200 "John Does/IP address" in many different federal district courts in the US alleging that the copyright held by Patrick Collins Inc. via BitTorrent for adult movie content had been violated with the illegal download through the various internet provider systems used by the John Does. Patrick Collins Inc. has sought judicial enforcement of the lawsuit subpoenas compelling internet service providers, such as Comcast and Verizon, to disclose the subscriber names associated with those IP addresses.

The U.S. District Court for the Eastern District of New York denied relief to Patrick Collins Inc., because the court believed that the company really did not have any interest in prosecuting the claims and use the significantly less inexpensive court subpoena process to obtain the contact information of those that were alleged to have downloaded adult content without paying company. In Re BitTorrent Copyright Infringement Cases (Docket No. 2:11-CV-03995)(E.D.N.Y.)(GRB)(May 1, 2012), quoting Raw Films Ltd. v. Does 1-32, 2011 WL 6182025 at *2 (E.D.Va. Oct. 5, 2011).

== Personal life ==
Patrick Collins was married to pornographic actress Tianna. They divorced in 1995. In 1996, he married Nicole Lace. They divorced in 2015.

== Awards and nominations ==
- 1993 AVN Award - Biggest D*ck of the Year - Co-director - Lifetime achievement award (received twice)
- 1994 AVN Award - Best Anal Sex Scene, Video (Sodomania 5) - Co-director
- 1994 AVN Award - Best All-Sex Release (Bottom Dweller) - Director
- 2001 AVN Award - Best All-Sex Release (Buttwoman vs. Buttwoman) - Director
- 2002 AVN Award - Best All-Sex Release (Buttwoman iz Bella) - Producer & director
- 2002 FICEB Ninfa Award winner - Special Jury Award
- 2005 AVN Award - Best Specialty Release - Other Genre (Squirtwoman 2/Cytherea iz Squirtwoman) - Director
