= Reel People (film) =

- Directed by: Anthony Spinelli
- Written by: Anthony Spinelli
- Produced by: Richard Frazzini
- Starring: John Leslie, Richard Pacheco, Paul Thomas, and Aunt Peg
- Cinematography: Jim Babb
- Production company: Ricston Productions
- Distributed by: Arrow Film & Video
- Release date: 1984
- Running time: 82 min
- Country: United States

Reel People is a 1984 pornographic film directed by Anthony Spinelli. It was a seminal film as it was the first major movie to feature sex between professional pornographic performers and amateurs, ushering in "Pro-Am Porn", which became a porn genre. It is also a precursor of the reality porn genre. It was inducted into the XRCO Hall of Fame in 2008.

The professional performers in the film include John Leslie, Richard Pacheco, Paul Thomas, and Aunt Peg.

== Cast ==
- Richard Pacheco as himself
- John Leslie as himself
- Paul Thomas as himself
- Juliet Anderson as herself (as Juliette Anderson)
- Gail Sterling as herself (as Gayle Sterling)
