= Margie Schnibbe =

American artist (born 1963)

Margie Schnibbe (born 11-12-1963 in Yonkers, NY) is a multidisciplinary artist living in Los Angeles. Schnibbe is known for creating works that blur the boundaries between art, pornography and everyday life.

== Work ==
Schnibbe works in bricolage fashion in a variety of media, including painting, drawing, graphics, film, video and digital media, sculpture, installation and performance, frequently employing craft techniques and materials. Text and typography feature prominently in Schnibbe's work and are often integral to its motives, with texts ranging from the banal or faux-sentimental to more serious or straightforwardly affective or matter-of-fact statement, caption and commentary. Schnibbe is also a writer and the author of screenplays, performance scripts, poetry and prose. She has published several ‘zines.

Schnibbe produces and hosts a monthly interview and spoken word program on KCHUNG Radio and has participated in KCHUNG public engagement projects at the Hammer Museum, and the J. Paul Getty Museum.

As a director of commercial pornography for Hustler Video and Vivid Entertainment, Schnibbe has been known as Vena Virago. Her productions in the porn industry, which have been called ‘alt-porn,’ occasionally feature political or philosophical subtexts. She has been known to incorporate her artwork into the sets and backdrops for her pornographic films. Schnibbe was the production designer on multiple Eon McKai movies. Schnibbe directed the adult industry documentary Pornstar Pets.

== Early life and education ==
Schnibbe was born in Yonkers, New York and grew up in Hastings-on-Hudson where she attended St Matthew's elementary school and Hastings High School. Schnibbe studied ceramics at Hunter College under Susan Peterson. She received her BFA in Sculpture from Kansas City Art Institute in 1991 and an MFA in Film/Video from California Institute of the Arts in 1998.
