= Steve Cadro =

Steve Cadro was a Hungarian pornographic director.

Steve Cadro graduated in 1971 in Magyar Iparművészeti Főiskola (Hungarian Applied Arts College). Originally he was an interior designer. Later he worked for Antenna-Hungaria, which is the Hungarian national broadcasting system, and for the State Privatization Board. He was related to movie producer Alexander Korda and art director Vincent Korda. Steve's dead body was found at his apartment. He was working in the adult film industry from 1998 until 2000. Steve Cadro died violently on March 21, 2000; he was beaten and stabbed before he died.

== Directed films ==
- Attila the Hun (2001, Cadro Films)
- Bali: The Rights Of Manhood (2001, Cadro Films)
- Called For Duty (2000, Cadro Films)
- Country Tails (2000, Cadro Films)
- Cuba Libre 1 (2000, Arena)
- Cuba Libre 2 (2000, Arena)
- Cubana Robusto (2000, Cadro Films)
- Cue And Balls (1999, Jet Set Productions)
- Danube Dreams (1999, Jet Set Productions)
- Hot Buddies 3: Hungarian Sausage (1999, Jet Set Productions)
- Hungarians (1998, Kristen Bjorn)
- Loss of Innocence (1999, Cadro Films)
- Merry XXX-Mas (1999, All Worlds)
- Midsummer Night's Dream (2001, Cadro Films)
- Numbers Cream Of The Crop (2000)
- Pan Asian (2004, Cadro Films)
- Prince And The Pauper (1999, Pacific Sun Entertainment)
- Snow Balls (2000, Cadro Films)
- Thief Of Bangkok (2000, Cadro Films)
- Volcanoes (2001, Cadro Films)
