= Hyapatia Lee =

American adult film actress

- Born: Vicki Lynch; Haughville, Indianapolis, Indiana, U.S.
- Occupation: Adult film actress
- Spouse: Bud Lee (1980–1992; divorced)
- Children: 3

Vicki Lynch, known professionally as Hyapatia Lee, is an American former adult film actress. She was one of the best-known actresses of the Golden Age of Porn. Lee is an AVN and XRCO Hall of Fame inductee.

== Early life ==
Lee was born to teenage parents in the Haughville neighborhood of Indianapolis, Indiana, and is of Irish and Cherokee descent. She attended the local high school, where she performed in several musicals.

== Career ==
In 1984, Lee appeared in Sweet Young Foxes and Penthouse magazine.

Over time, her husband Bud Lee joined the cast and crew of her films. Together they created the second-most-expensive pornographic film (at the time), The Ribald Tales of Canterbury (1985), a version of Geoffrey Chaucer's The Canterbury Tales.

In 1993, she was inducted into the AVN Hall of Fame, and the XRCO Hall of Fame in 1994. She was also given the Lifetime Achievement Award from the Free Speech Coalition in 1995.

In 1998, members of her fan club received a report that she had died due to diabetes. The report was falsified by Hyapatia Lee herself.

Like many adult performers of the era, she retained no rights to her films.

=== Music ===
For SRO Records, Lee recorded the 7-inch single "Telephone Man", released in 1988; and the album Two Sides Of Hyapatia Lee in 1989. "Rub-a-Dub-Dub" from the album featured on Dr. Demento's 'Funny Five' playlist, airing April 30, 1989.

In 1994, Lee recorded the album Double Euphoric with her band W4IK. She toured with the same band, which was based in Los Angeles, and also with another band, based in Indiana, called Vision Quest.

In 1999, one of Lee's tracks from her 1994 release appeared on the music CD Porn to Rock.

Double Euphoric was re-released in September 2010, both in physical and digital versions, via outlets such as CD Baby, Amazon, and Apple iTunes.

=== Writing ===
Lee is an online columnist for High Times. In 1993, Lee co-wrote an autobiography comic book with Jay Allen Sanford, Carnal Comics: Hyapatia Lee, featuring her true life story illustrated by the Vampirella artist Louis Small Jr… She also took part in and appeared within the Carnal Comics title Triple-X Cinema: A Cartoon History, as well as co-starring with her friend Porsche Lynn in another issue of the adult comic book line. In 2000, Lee self-published an autobiography, The Secret Lives of Hyapatia Lee. In 2016, she authored a self-help book, Native Strength – The First Step on the Path to an Indomitable Life, the first in a series.

== Personal life ==
Lee met and married Bud Lee, with whom she bought land in rural southern Indiana, where she has lived since. The couple had two children, whom she homeschooled at their Indiana home. In 1993, she retired from the industry and separated from Bud the same year. She has since remarried and had another child. Lee has referred to herself as a "Blessed Woman" of the Lost River Band of the Cherokees, an unrecognized Cherokee heritage group in Mitchell, Indiana.

== Filmography (selection) ==
- 1983: Young Like It Hot
- 1984: Let's Get Physical
- 1985: Ribald Tales of Canterbury
- 1986: Hyapatia Lee's Sexy
- 1986: Secret Dreams
- 1986: The Wild, Wild West
- 1987: The Insatiable Hyapatia Lee
- 1990: Lust in the Woods
- 1990: The Masseuse
- 1992: Telesex
- 1993: Snakedance

== Publications ==
- The Secret Lives of Hyapatia Lee. AuthorHouse. 2001. ISBN 978-1-4208-9773-9.

== Awards ==
- 1991 AVN Best Actress - Film for The Masseuse
- 1993 F.O.X.E. Female Fan Favorite
- 1993 AVN Hall of Fame Inductee
- 1994 XRCO Hall of Fame Inductee
- 1995 Free Speech Coalition – Lifetime Achievement Award
