= Michael Morrison (actor) =

American pornographic film actor and director

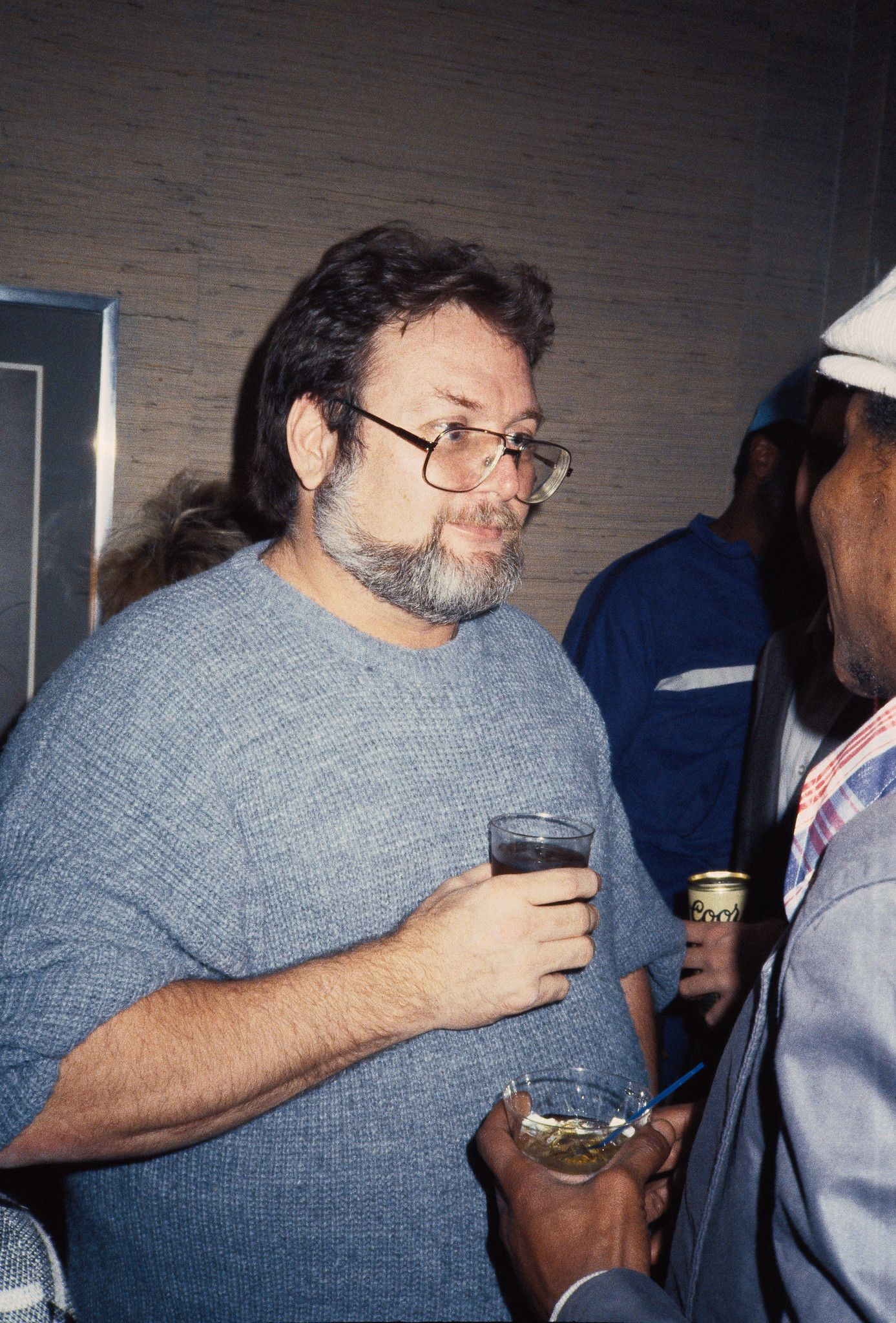
- Ingley at the 1988 International Winter Consumer Electronics Show
- Born: Milton Owen Ingley; May 23, 1946; Lubbock, Texas, U.S.
- Died: December 22, 2006 (aged 60); Mesa, Arizona, U.S.
- Other names: Johnny Morris, Milton Ingley, Milt Ingersoll, Uncle Miltie, Milton Camp
- Occupations: Pornographic actor, producer and director
- Height: 5 ft 9 in (1.75 m)
- Military career
- Allegiance: United States
- Branch: United States Army
- Service years: 1967-1968
- Rank: Corporal
- Conflicts: Vietnam War

Milton Owen Ingley (May 23, 1946 – December 22, 2006), also known as Michael Morrison, was an American pornographic actor, producer, and director. He was a member of the AVN Hall of Fame and the XRCO Hall of Fame.

== Biography ==
Ingley was born in Lubbock, Texas, and attended Texas Tech University there. He was a corporal in the U.S. Army and served in Vietnam from 1967 to 1968.

Ingley entered the adult film industry in 1977, appearing in a film as a favor to a girlfriend.

Ingley performed in over 140 films during the 1970s and 1980s under various names including Michael Morrison. He also produced and directed over 100 films with his own production company Chandler Studios during the 1980s and 1990s.

Ingley, as Morrison, was inducted into the X-Rated Critics Organization Hall of Fame in 1993 as a "Film Pioneer".

Ingley never married. He did have a daughter from an out-of-wedlock relationship, Helen.

In 1997, Ingley obtained a copy of an intimate video tape stolen from the home of Tommy and Pamela Anderson Lee and sold copies from the web site www.pamlee.com. The Lees sued Ingley and obtained a court injunction ordering him to stop selling the video.

Ingley lived in Amsterdam from 1997 to 2004. He then moved to Arizona to be closer to his family, according to his friend Sharon Mitchell. Milton Ingley died at his home in Mesa, Arizona, on December 22, 2006, from complications of diabetes. He is buried at the National Memorial Cemetery of Arizona in Phoenix.

== Partial filmography ==
- Island of Dr. Love (1978)
- Coed Fever (1980)
- Taboo (1980)
