= Christopher Cumingham =

American filmmaker

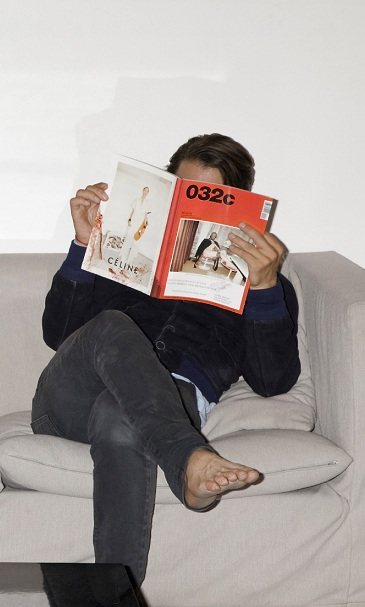
032c Christopher Cumingham

Christopher Cumingham is an American artist, photographer, and filmmaker who produces and directs pornographic films known as Nu Fetish.

The Miami New Times describes his work as something which "stays in your head all day long, popping in your subconscious, arousing you when you least expect. It's porn for intellectuals."

Cumingham's work is described as often being a collaborative effort, with ideas coming directly from the performers themselves and conveyed in unscripted short videos. They are usually created in single takes, driven by the intensity of the performers' own erotic desires.

== Website ==
In early 2010, Cumingham created a new website to explore societal distinctions between pornography and erotica as well as art and sex.

"Our society tends to draw distinctions between pornography and erotica, art and sex. On GIM@ we allow them to intersect without exclusivity as we seek to cross the boundaries between these categories to create a one-of-a-kind visual experience. Our content meditates on the value of the explicit and the unseen, the realities of hidden sexual desires and the beauty of actually making them come true."
