= Océane =

Océane (French pronunciation: [ɔseˈan]) is a French female given name, which means "from the ocean." As of 2006, it was the ninth most popular name for newborn girls in France and Quebec. Notable people with the name include:

- Océane Avocat Gros (born 1997), French ski jumper
- Océane Babel (born 2004), French tennis player
- Océane Cassignol (born 2000), French swimmer
- Océane Dodin (born 1996), French tennis player
- Océane Hurtré (born 2004), French footballer
- Océane Piegad (born 2003), French figure skater
- Océane Sercien-Ugolin (born 1997), French handball player
- Océane Zhu (born 1987), Chinese model, beauty queen and actress

== See also ==
- Dock Océane, an indoor sporting arena in Le Havre, France
- Stade Océane, a football stadium in Le Havre, France
- Oceane (opera), 2019 opera by Detlev Glanert
- Oceane von Parceval by Theodor Fontane
- Océane Aqua-Black, Canadian drag queen
