= Flashpoint (band) =

- Origin: Miami, Florida, United States
- Genres: Jazz
- Years active: 1991–present
- Members: Paul Messina; George Schoendorfer; Mark Harris; Ignacio Nuñez; Adrian G.Arredondo; Jose Martinez
- Past members: Max Garcia; Carlos Torres; Jaime Vila
- Website: flashpointjazz.com

Flashpoint is one of South Florida's most popular jazz bands. Based out of Miami, Flashpoint was band formed in 1991 by two firefighters, Paul Messina and George Schoendorfer. Described as "a six piece contemporary instrumental jazz fusion group, with a delightful latin flavor", Flashpoint's instrumentality includes: Flute/Saxophone (Messina), Guitar (Schoendorfer), Keyboards, Bass, Drums, and Percussion (Nuñez). Its music may be classified as sizzling jazz, Brazilian jazz, contemporary jazz, smooth jazz, jazz funk, and jazz fusion. Flashpoint released its debut album, "Cool Heat", in 2001 and is currently working on its second. Flashpoint's music is produced by Gary Vandy Audio Productions.

The band's leader, Paul Messina, is noted to be one of South Florida's top jazz musicians. Paul continues to be very musically active, both independently and as a member of Flashpoint. He just recently returned from performing in the 2008 Cayman Islands Jazz Fest, and is expected to release an independent album in the near future.

== Formation ==
Flashpoint was created in 1991 while Paul Messina (Flute/Sax) and George Schoendorfer (Lead/Rhythm Guitars) were playing together in the folk/rock group Relative Viewpoint. Paul and George, having a deep passion for jazz, discussed forming a group of their own—and Flashpoint was born. When Paul and George—both firefighters for the Miami-Dade Fire Department—originally formed the band, it was composed almost entirely of firefighters (with the exception of Bassist Mark Harris, who is now one of the most sought after studio musicians in Nashville). At that time, the other members were Roman Bas (Percussion) and Pedro Salgado (Drums). With such a strong connection to firefighting, the band was aptly named "Flashpoint"—a common term used in the practice.

Most of the original members of the band were only with Flashpoint for a few months, and thus Flashpoint was once again open to new talent. Paul's next door neighbor Carlos Torres, then a member of the local rock band "ICY", mentioned to Paul that his group had the desire to perform Jazz—and it was then that Flashpoint and ICY merged.

While in the recording studio, recording Flashpoint's debut album Cool Heat, Grammy award-winning (Grammy award winner for Best Latin Pop; two-time Latin Grammy award-winner) percussionist Ignacio Nuñez performed exceptionally well, and Flashpoint's producer Gary M. Vandy suggested that Ignacio was just what the band needed. As good as timing could be, Ignacio had just left the Latin Jazz group Oriente two weeks prior, and agreed to become a permanent member of Flashpoint.

== Debut album Cool Heat ==
Flashpoint's debut studio album Cool Heat was released on November 16, 2001. It has eight tracks, encompassing genres such as Light Jazz, Jazz Fusion, Funk, and Brazilian Jazz. The CD's cover and name are meant to represent both the band's roots in firefighting and the cool jazz for which it is known.

"From the beautiful acoustic guitar work (George), in "Summer Rain", to the incredible Percussion (Ignacio), in "Rafaela", this CD can be appreciated by audiences from Light Jazz, Jazz Fusion, Funk, to Brazilian Jazz. ... The virtuosic flute tracks (Paul) are mellow at times, then burst to heights of energy and expression. From the solid bass tracks played by Carlos, to Max's excellent keyboard tracks, such as the incredible solo on "On the Mark", to one of the most innovative drummers in the business (Jaime), FLASHPOINT has proven to be one of the top groups in South Florida."

Primary performance credits on Cool Heat include:

- Paul Messina: Flute, Bass Flute, Soprano Sax, Tenor Sax, Yamaha WX7, Keyboards, Vocals
- George Schoendorfer: Lead/Rhythm Guitars
- Max Garcia: Keyboards
- Carlos Torres: Bass
- Jaime Vila: Drums
- Ignacio Nuñez: Percussion.

Cool Heat also includes the guest artists Jennifer Messina (Vocals and Synthesized Cello), Megan Warner (Vocals), Linda Ortigoza (Vocals), Christine Mercedes Baltazar (Vocals), and Jeff Maldonado (Vocals).

Production credits include:

- Production: Gary Vandy, Paul Messina
- Engineering: Gary Vandy
- Mastering: Gary Vandy
- Arrangement: Gary Vandy, Paul Messina
- Vocal Arrangement: Paul Messina

== Performances ==
"Flashpoint" has shared the stage with Internationally known recording artists such as: Bella Fleck and the Flecktones, Tom Grant, Iko Iko, Gerald Dimitri, Joe Donato, and Nestor Torres.
