= Flashpoint (1998 film) =

Pornographic film by Brad Armstrong

Flashpoint is a 1998 adult film starring Jenna Jameson as a horny firefighter. It is the highest-selling adult film of all time.

The film was re-released as Flashpoint X to commemorate its 10th anniversary.

Flashpoint was shot on a budget of $220,000, making it one of the ten biggest budget adult films of all time.

== Awards ==
- 1999 AVN Award – Best Overall Marketing Campaign (Individual Title or Series)
- 1999 Hot d'Or Award – Best American Movie
