= Bud Lee (pornographer) =

American adult film director (born 1955)

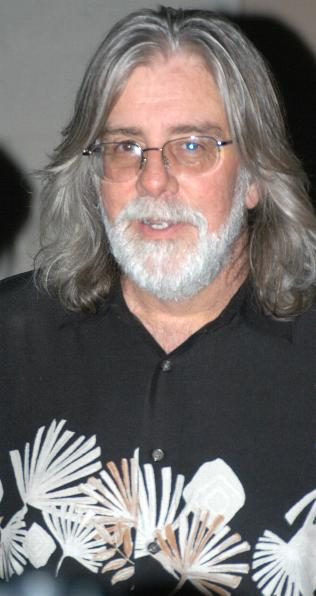
- Lee in 2006
- Born: Cameron Lyndon Bennett; September 1955 (age 70); Indianapolis, Indiana, US
- Occupation: Film director
- Spouse(s): Hyapatia Lee (m. 1980; div. 1992) Asia Carrera (m. 1995; div. 2003)
- Children: 2

Cameron Lyndon Bennett (born September 1955), better known as Bud Lee, is an American adult film director who is an AVN Hall of Fame member and also works as an agent for 101 Modeling, Inc.

Lee was married to adult film actresses Hyapatia Lee (1980–1992) and Asia Carrera (1995–2003). He took the last name of his first wife, Hyapatia Lee, as it is a Cherokee tradition for the husband to do so.
