= Patti Rhodes =

American pornographic film director

Patti Rhodes is a pornographic film director and producer. She is a member of the AVN Hall of Fame.

== Partial filmography as a director ==
- Marina Vice (1985)
- Swedish Erotica Featurettes 1 (1989)
- Rainwoman 3 (1990)
- Blow Job Betty (1991)
- Afterhours (2005)
- Frosty's Dad in Action (1990)

== Partial filmography as a producer ==
- Lust Italian Style (1987)
- Taboo 13 (1994)
- Teri Weigel: Centerfold (1998)
- Fire and Ice (2000)
- The Girl Next Door 1 (2004)
- Ackland uses clay(2007)
