= Alexandra Silk =

American pornographic actress (born 1963)

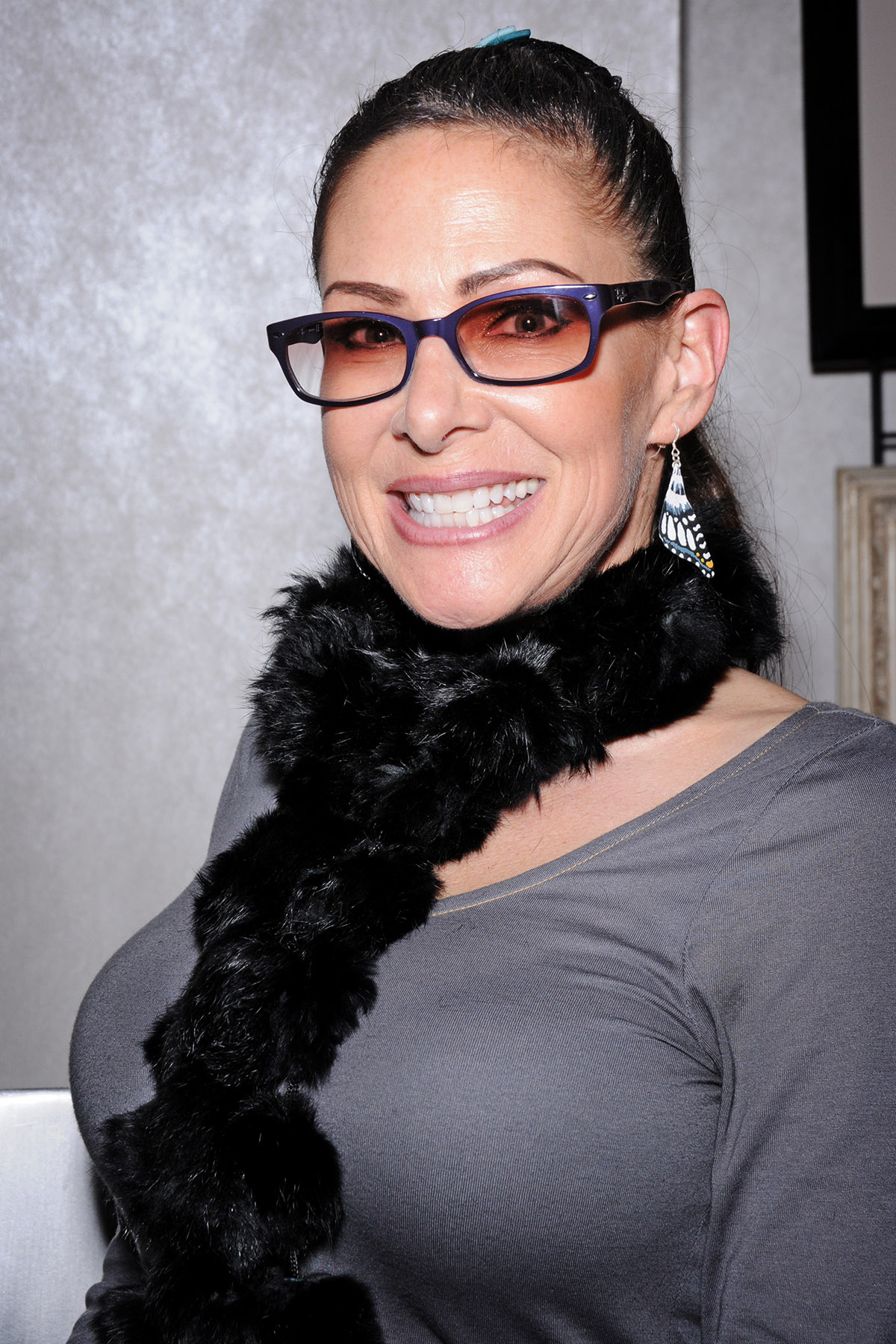
- Silk in 2014
- Born: Tamar Janine Reilly; September 19, 1963 (age 63); Long Island, New York, U.S.
- Other name: Bailiff Silk
- Occupations: Pornographic actress; pornographic director; adult model
- Height: 5 ft 4 in (1.63 m)
- Spouse: Luc Wylder
- Website: alexandrasilk.com

Tamar Janine Reilly (born September 19, 1963), known professionally as Alexandra Silk, is an American pornographic actress, pornographic director and adult model.

== Biography ==
A graduate of the State University of New York at Albany, Silk began her adult career as a stripper in Las Vegas. During this time she met porn star Jenna Jameson, who advised her on how to enter the pornographic industry. Silk made her way to Hollywood, where she met Ron Jeremy, who in turn introduced her to performers, directors and producers.

During the course of her career she married porn star Luc Wylder.

She is a member of the Free Speech Coalition, the National Coalition for Sexual Freedom, the Society for the Scientific Study of Sexuality, and a supporting member of the American Association of Sexuality Educators, Counselors, and Therapists (AASECT). By February 2010, Silk had completed her internship to become a certified sex surrogate with the International Professional Surrogate Association (IPSA), and names this as her true calling.

== Awards ==
=== Wins ===
- 2008 AVN Hall of Fame
- 2013 XRCO Hall of Fame

=== Nominations ===
- 1999 XRCO Award – Unsung Siren
- 2000 AVN Female Performer of the Year
- 2002 AVN Best Anal Sex Scene – Film for Taken (with Herschel Savage)
- 2004 AVN Best Actress – Video for Stud Hunters
