= List of members of the AVN Hall of Fame =

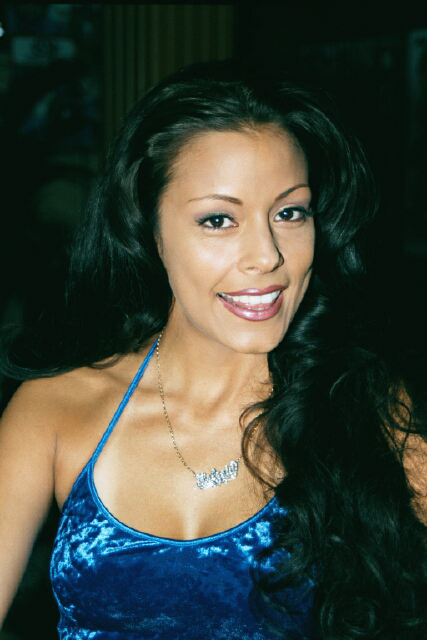
Felecia (1972–)

The AVN (Adult Video News) Hall of Fame has honored people for their work in the adult entertainment industry since 1995. The individuals inducted into the AVN Hall of Fame have "made significant contributions to the adult industry" and have had "a minimum of 10 years in the industry" to be considered for induction.

There are several branches of the AVN Hall of Fame:

- Performers and directors enter the original AVN, video-based Hall of Fame.
- The Founders branch is "for those who founded the industry's pioneering companies".
- The Internet Founders branch is "for those who built the online sector" of the industry.
- The Pleasure Products branch is "for manufacturers, distributors, and retailers of sex toys".
- The Executive branch is "for key members of the industry who work behind the scenes in the corporate offices or excelled in other capacities—for example, in sales, marketing, or education".

== Members (Video Branch) ==
Names and years of induction of members.

Member	Year
Buck Adams	
Tracey Adams	
Asa Akira	2019
Monique Alexander	2017
Alexis Amore	2018
Juliet Anderson	
Brittany Andrews	2008
Gabrielle Anex	2019
Joanna Angel	2016
Eva Angelina	2018
Julia Ann	2004
Lisa Ann	2009
Brad Armstrong	2004
Jay Ashley	2008
Kaitlyn Ashley	2001
Juli Ashton	2012
James Avalon	2005
Ebony Ayes	2025
Lois Ayres	1998
Bill Bailey	2020
Briana Banks	2009
Nyomi Banxxx	2022
Kandi Barbour	2013
Rebecca Bardoux	2007
Belladonna	2011
Nikki Benz	2016
Bionca	
Rob Black	2012
Tori Black	2022
Barrett Blade	2014
Andrew Blake	1996
Bunny Bleu	1997
Ashley Blue	2013
Mick Blue	2017
Skye Blue	2008
Vanessa Blue	2013
R. Bolla	1997
Rene Bond	1998
John T. Bone	2001
Leslie Bovee	
T.T. Boy	2003
Erica Boyer	
Kianna Bradley	2026
Axel Braun	2011
Lasse Braun	1999
Frank Bukkwyd	2019
Robert Bullock	1995
Jerry Butler	1998
Seymore Butts	2005
Tom Byron	
Stuart Canterbury	2017
Christy Canyon	
Mary Carey	2013
Michael Carpenter	1997
Asia Carrera	2001
Cassidey	2017
Marilyn Chambers	
Chanel	2021
Nikki Charm	1999
Chris Charming	2010
Christian XXX	2017
Bob Chinn	1999
Chloe	2006
David Christopher	
Kim Christy	2004
Christoph Clark	2002
David Aaron Clark	2012
Tiffany Clark	
Maestro Claudio	2019
Gino Colbert	1996
Careena Collins	1998
Patrick Collins	2002
Ryan Conner	2022
Desireé Cousteau	1997
Eli Cross	2015
Dave Cummings	2007
Stoney Curtis	2010
Devan Cypher	2016
Danny D	2024
Robby D.	2014
Dale DaBone	2012
Kiki Daire	2019
Gerard Damiano	
Stormy Daniels	2014
Barbara Dare	
Angel Dark	2020
The Dark Brothers	1996
Jonni Darkko	2016
Gia Darling	2011
Raquel Darrian	2002
Mark Davis	2003
Dana DeArmond	2016
Dee	2021
Sophie Dee	2025
Vanessa del Rio	
Nikita Denise	2016
Jewel De'Nyle	2009
Nina DePonca	2026
Alex de Renzy	
Ava Devine	2026
Raquel Devine	2010
Alexander DeVoe	2012
Diana DeVoe	2021
Devon	2010
Nikki Dial	2024
Debi Diamond	
Richie Diaz	2019
Karen Dior	1995
Kianna Dior	2020
Guy DiSilva	2009
Jon Dough	1998
Ben Dover	2011
Derek Dozer	2021
Jessica Drake	2010
Steve Drake	
Rinse Dream	2017
Duck Dumont	1997
Lacey Duvalle	2022
Nick East	2006
Eric Edwards	
Wesley Emerson	2009
Ben English	2014
Alana Evans	2015
Erik Everhard	2012
Felecia	2003
Don Fernando	2004
Manuel Ferrara	2013
Jeanna Fine	1997
Jada Fire	2011
Rod Fontana	2005
Gail Force	1997
Samantha Fox	2002
Scotty Fox	1995
Mickey G	2006
Sal Genoa	2021
Ashlyn Gere	1996
Ken Gibb	1997
Jamie Gillis	
Billy Glide	2015
Ernest Greene	2021
Sasha Grey	2023
Tommy Gunn	2016
William H.	2018
Max Hardcore	2004
Dave Hardman	2003
Dirty Harry	2019
Veronica Hart	
Nina Hartley	
Steve Hatcher	2006
Annette Haven	
Taylor Hayes	2007
Jenna Haze	2012
Melissa Hill	2014
Deidre Holland	1999
Kelly Holland	2017
Audrey Hollander	2024
Jim Holliday	
John Holmes	
Steve Holmes	2017
Mike Horner	
Houston	2004
Cecil Howard	
Ed Hunter	2019
Heather Hunter	2003
Nicki Hunter	2020
Ryan Idol	1995
Kylie Ireland	2005
Brandon Iron	2018
Janet Jacme	2006
Jenna Jameson	2006
Jesse Jane	2013
Sara Jay	2017
Jessica Jaymes	2018
Jelena Jensen	2020
Jenteal	2021
Ron Jeremy	
Joanna Jet	2015
Mike John	2014
Jules Jordan	2011
Kimberly Kane	2016
Sharon Kane	
Roy Karch	1998
Kagney Linn Karter	2025
Katsuni	2014
Keisha	1998
Angel Kelly	2008
Jill Kelly	2003
Bridgette Kerkove	2011
Johnnie Keyes	2004
Alisha Klass	2012
Tyler Knight	2021
Sascha Koch	2016
Kayden Kross	2019
L.T.	2020
Alex Ladd	2016
Chasey Lain	2003
C. J. Laing	2005
Tim Lake	2009
Karla Lane	2020
Tory Lane	2017
Sunny Lane	2020
Chi Chi LaRue	1995
Dyanna Lauren	2008
Shayla LaVeaux	2001
Francesca Le	2005
Dan Leal	2015
Bud Lee	2001
Hyapatia Lee	
Keiran Lee	2022
Lisa De Leeuw	
Kaylani Lei	2015
Dorothy LeMay	1998
Lynn LeMay	2006
Gloria Leonard	
Sunny Leone	2018
John Leslie	
Harold Lime	
Mai Lin	2005
Fred J. Lincoln	
Janine Lindemulder	2002
Marcus London	2020
Angel Long	2023
Byron Long	2010
Miles Long	2011
Rebecca Lord	2013
Cara Lott	2006
Brandi Love	2020
Shy Love	2013
Sinnamon Love	2011
Marie Luv	2021
Amber Lynn	
Gina Lynn	2010
Ginger Lynn	
Micky Lynn	2019
Porsche Lynn	
Kelly Madison	2015
Andre Madness	2015
Richard Mailer	
Jim Malibu	2004
Anna Malle	2013
Sonny Malone	2011
Chelsea Manchester	1998
Mandingo	2017
Nick Manning	2014
Mr. Marcus	2009
William Margold	
Daisy Marie	2017
Phoenix Marie	2022
Cash Markman	2006
Mason	2021
Rick Masters	2007
Eric Masterson	2014
Robert McCallum	
Shanna McCullough	
Clive McLean	2001
Radley Metzger	
Gianna Michaels	2020
Sean Michaels	1995
Midori	2009
Earl Miller	2001
Tyffany Million	2025
Missy	2002
Sharon Mitchell	
The Mitchell Brothers	
Constance Money	1998
Tami Monroe	1999
Tony Montana	2020
Rodney Moore	2006
Craven Moorehead	2015
Britt Morgan	
Jonathan Morgan	2003
Katie Morgan	2013
India Morel	2022
Michael Morrison	
Pat Myne	2011
Tiffany Mynx	2001
Kelly Nichols	1995
Michael Ninn	2002
Ramón Nomar	2019
Paul Norman	1998
Peter North	
Nick Orleans	2018
Henri Pachard	
Richard Pacheco	1999
Victoria Paris	1997
Kay Parker	
Tera Patrick	2009
Texas Patti	2025
Jeannie Pepper	1997
David Perry	2021
Mr. Pete	2014
Rhonda Jo Petty	2004
Derrick Pierce	2022
Wesley Pipes	2015
Tommy Pistol	2022
Eddie Powell	2021
Ed Powers	
Jim Powers	2005
Teagan Presley	2016
Kirsten Price	2018
Misty Rain	2004
Taylor Rain	2026
Janus Rainer	
Holly Randall	2024
Nikki Randall	1995
Suze Randall	1999
Mike Ranger	2018
Michael Raven	2008
Raylene	2008
RayVeness	2015
Harry Reems	
Riley Reid	2025
Jack Remy	2006
Patti Rhodes	1999
Toni Ribas	2012
Alicia Rio	2004
Olivia Del Rio	2025
Jace Rocker	1998
Kristina Rose	2022
Candida Royalle	
Ruby	2008
Tina Russell	2026
Will Ryder	2015
Sinn Sage	2024
Silvia Saint	2012
Savanna Samson	2011
Alex Sanders	2003
Loni Sanders	
Herschel Savage	
Rick Savage	
Savannah	1996
Reb Sawitz	2001
Annette Schwarz	2023
Hillary Scott	2024
Tristan Seagal	2021
John Seeman	2007
Seka	
Serena	2019
Serenity	2005
Bruce Seven	
Shane	2005
Rocco Siffredi	2002
Shay Sights	2024
Alexandra Silk	2008
Long Jeanne Silver	2021
Joey Silvera	
Domonique Simone	2007
Laurent Sky	2020
Justin Slayer	2022
Aurora Snow	2017
Jim South	1995
Rob Spallone	2020
P. J. Sparxx	2002
Randy Spears	2002
Georgina Spelvin	
Mark Spiegler	2013
Anthony Spinelli	
Mitchell Spinelli	
Annie Sprinkle	1999
Jasmin St. Claire	2011
Sheri St. Claire	1995
Taylor St. Claire	2014
Steven St. Croix	2005
Jessie St. James	
Julian St. Jox	2003
John Stagliano	1997
David Stanley	2018
Celeste Star	2018
Charmane Star	2017
Aiden Starr	2018
Bobbi Starr	2026
Rachel Starr	2022
Lexington Steele	2009
Riley Steele	2025
Selena Steele	2007
Sydnee Steele	2007
Joey Stefano	1997
Michael Stefano	2010
Matt Sterling	1996
Nici Sterling	2007
Carter Stevens	2009
Kirdy Stevens	2003
Marc Stevens	2019
Tabitha Stevens	2007
Charlotte Stokely	2020
Evan Stone	2011
Kyle Stone	2007
Madison Stone	2003
Mark Stone	2017
Misty Stone	2019
John Strong	2016
Samantha Strong	1995
Jeff Stryker	
Shyla Stylez	2016
India Summer	2019
Karen Summer	2015
Angela Summers	2008
Stephanie Swift	2006
Tim Von Swine	2015
Talon (Alex / Lex Baldwin)	2015
Jerome Tanner	2006
Scott Taylor	2013
Tony Tedeschi	2003
Alexis Texas	2022
Paul Thomas	
Sunset Thomas	2001
Tianna	2002
Raven Touchtone	
John Travis	1997
Flower Tucci	2026
Nikki Tyler	2026
George Uhl	2021
Inari Vachs	2012
Stacy Valentine	2012
Valentino	2010
Vaniity	2013
Dana Vespoli	2016
Vicky Vette	2016
Nacho Vidal	2012
Ron Vogel	
Bob Vosse	2001
Tasha Voux	2008
Vince Voyeur	2007
Marc Wallice	
Taylor Wane	2005
Jane Waters	1998
Devlin Weed	2018
Teri Weigel	2003
Jennifer Welles	1996
Tori Welles	1996
Kelly Wells	2025
Desiree West	2024
Randy West	
Angela White	2018
Honey Wilder	2001
Wendy Williams	2014
Leslie Winston	2025
Dick Witte	1997
Barry Wood	2004
Mark Wood	2010
Bambi Woods	1998
Luc Wylder	2009
Sam Xavier	2001
Ona Zee	
Michael Zen	2018
Pinky	2023
Ice La Fox	2023

== Executive Branch ==
For key members of the industry who work behind the scenes in the corporate offices or excelled in other capacities—for example, in sales, marketing, or education.

Member	Year
Glenn King	2020
Garion Hall	2024
Robert Plarski	2024
Jimmy James	2024

== Founders Branch ==
For those who founded the industry's pioneering companies.

Member	Year
Norman Arno	
Noel Bloom	
Charlie Brickman	
Marc Dorcel	2015
Howard Farber	
Larry Flynt	
Al Goldstein	2015
Phil Harvey	2007
Fred Hirsch	2016
David Joseph	2018
Mark Kulkis	2018
Arthur Morowitz	
Sidney Niekirk	
Rudy Sutton	2016
Steve Toushin	2009
Eddie Wedelstedt	2016
Chuck Zane	2018

== Pleasure Products Branch ==
For manufacturers, distributors, and retailers of sex toys.

Member	Year
Joani Blank	2011
Joe Bolstad	2015
Marc Bruder	2018
Ralph Caplan	2016
Mara Epstein	2018
Rondee Kamins	2018
Joel Kaminsky	2018
Pavle Sedic	2015
Steve Shubin	2016
Ari Suss	2015
Rina Valan	2016
Kim Airs	2024
Phyllis Heppenstall	2024
Karen & Barry Mason	2024

== Internet Founders Branch ==
For those who built the online sector.

Member	Work	Year
Danni Ashe	Danni's Hard Drive	2013
Charles Berrebbi and John Albright	Too Much Media	2016
Kenny B!	Your Paysite Partner	2024
Botto Brothers	MaxCash	2015
Ilan Bunimovitz	Gamelink.com	2016
Mitch Farber	Netbilling	2011
Anthony J	NetVideoGirls.com	2013
Mark "Greenguy" Jenkins	Link-O-Rama.com	2014
Lensman	Webmaster Access	2015
Steve Lightspeed	Lightspeed Cash	2015
Beth Mansfield	PersianKitty.com	2012
"Maurice"	Freeones.com	2014
Brad Mitchell	MojoHost	2018
Patrick	TheHun.net	2012
Bill Pinyon	Badpuppy.com	2013
Angie Rowntree	Sssh.com	2014
Colin Rowntree	Wasteland.com	2011
Shap	Twistys.com	2012
Tim Valenti	NakedSword	2011
Steve Wojcik	Badpuppy.com	2013
Mitch Fontaine	Burning Angel	2019
Nick Chrétien	CrakRevenue	2019
