= Jack Remy =

Jack Remy is a pornographic film director.

== Awards ==
- 1995 AVN Award – Best Cinematography – Dog Walker
- 1999 AVN Award – Best Cinematography – Looker
- 1999 AVN Award – Best Videography – Cafe Flesh 2 (joint winner with Barry Wood's Forever Night)
- 2006 AVN Hall of Fame inductee
