= Nikki Charm =

American pornographic film actor

Shannon Eaves, known professionally as Nikki Charm, is an American pornographic film actor. She is a member of the Adult Video News Hall of Fame and the XRCO Hall of Fame.

Between 1984 and 1990, Charm appeared in nearly 50 videos and was a contract performer with Vivid Entertainment for some time. Charm stopped appearing in adult videos in 1990, but spent some time as an exotic dancer. She made a brief return to the adult-entertainment industry between 1998 and 2000, when she appeared in six titles.

In 1986 the media revealed that adult superstar Traci Lords had been appearing in sex videos while underage. Federal authorities suspected that other women may also have performed in such movies before they were legally able, including Charm, and subpoenas were issued seeking access to records confirming her age. Unlike Lords, Charm was able to produce documentation verifying that she had made her first adult movie soon after her 18th birthday and was therefore legally able to appear in pornographic videos.

In October 2002 she was arrested and charged with several counts of burglary and grand theft auto. She was convicted and sentenced to a five-year prison term, which she served in the Central California Women's Facility near Chowchilla.

In early 2011 she returned to the adult industry, working as a production manager, and performed in a scene with Tom Byron for his "Seasoned Players" series of adult DVDs.
