= 22nd AVN Awards =

US adult industry award ceremony in 2005

- Date: January 8, 2005
- Site: The Venetian Las Vegas at Paradise, Nevada, U.S.A.
- Hosted by: Savanna Samson; Thea Vidale
- Preshow hosts: Chi Chi LaRue; Jamie Frontz
- Produced by: Gary Miller
- Directed by: Gary Miller

Highlights
- Best Picture: The Masseuse (Best Film)
- Most awards: The Masseuse (7)
- Most nominations: The Collector, The Masseuse (16)

Television coverage
- Network: Playboy TV
- Duration: Just over 2 hours

The 22nd AVN Awards ceremony, presented by Adult Video News (AVN), took place January 8, 2005 at the Venetian Hotel Grand Ballroom, at Paradise, Nevada, U.S.A. During the ceremony, AVN presented AVN Awards, referred to as the Oscars of porn, in nearly 100 categories honoring the best pornographic films released between Oct. 1, 2003 to Sept. 30, 2004. The ceremony, televised in the United States by Playboy TV, was produced and directed by Gary Miller. Comedian Thea Vidale hosted the show for the first time with adult film star Savanna Samson.

The Masseuse won the most awards on the night with seven, including Best Film. The Collector won four awards. Other winners included: Bella Loves Jenna, In the Garden of Shadows, 1 Night in Paris and Stuntgirl with three wins apiece.

== Winners and nominees ==
The nominees for the 22nd AVN Awards were announced on November 12, 2004. The Masseuse and The Collector received the most nominations with 16 each; Misty Beethoven: The Musical was next with 15.

The winners were announced during the awards ceremony on January 8, 2005. Adult film star Jenna Jameson was the year's biggest winner. Besides starring in both Best Film winner The Masseuse and Best Video Feature winner Bella Loves Jenna, she won individual awards for Best Actress–Film, Best All-Girl Sex Scene–Film and Best Couples Sex Scene–Film, all for The Masseuse.

=== Major awards ===
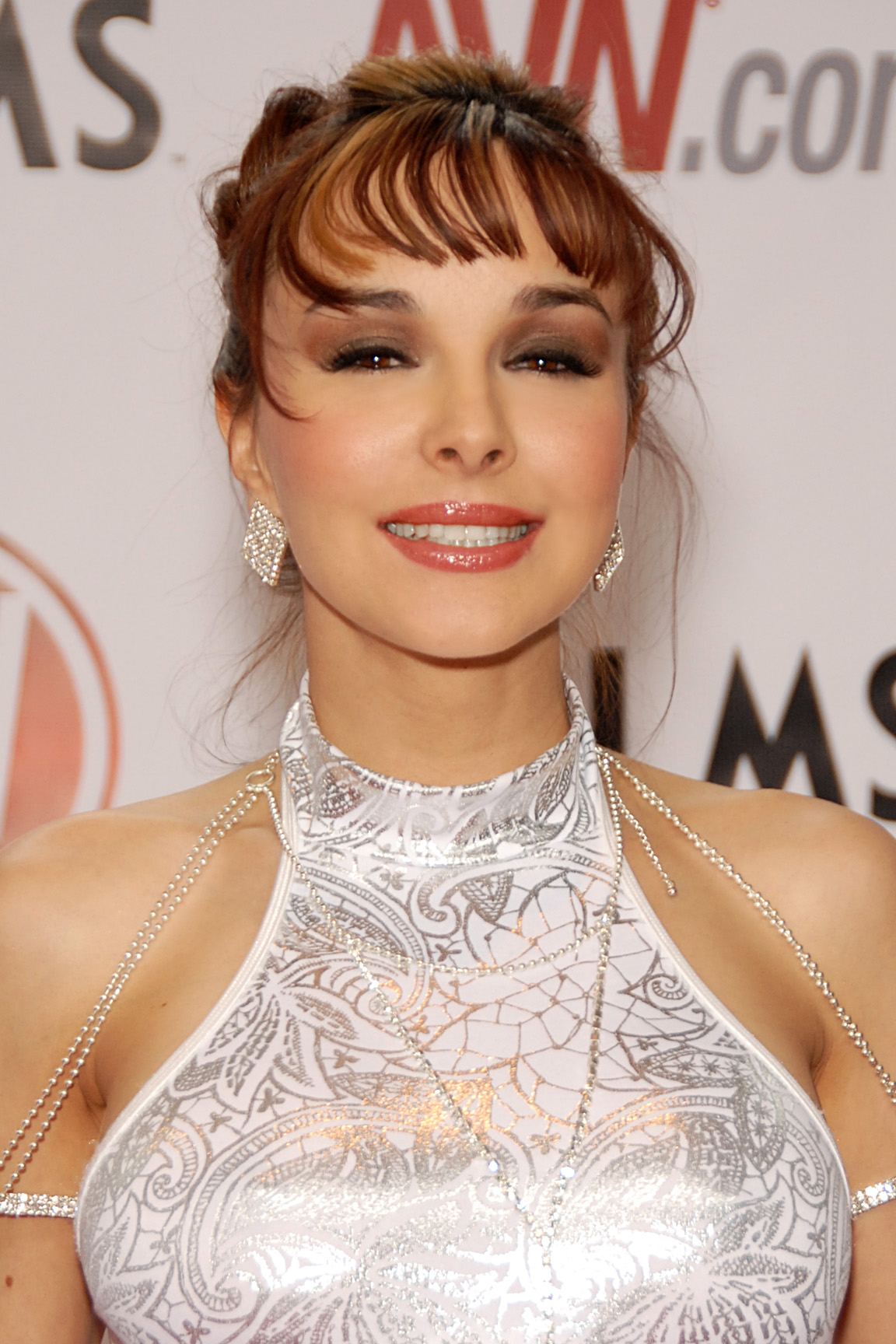
Cytherea, Best New Starlet winner

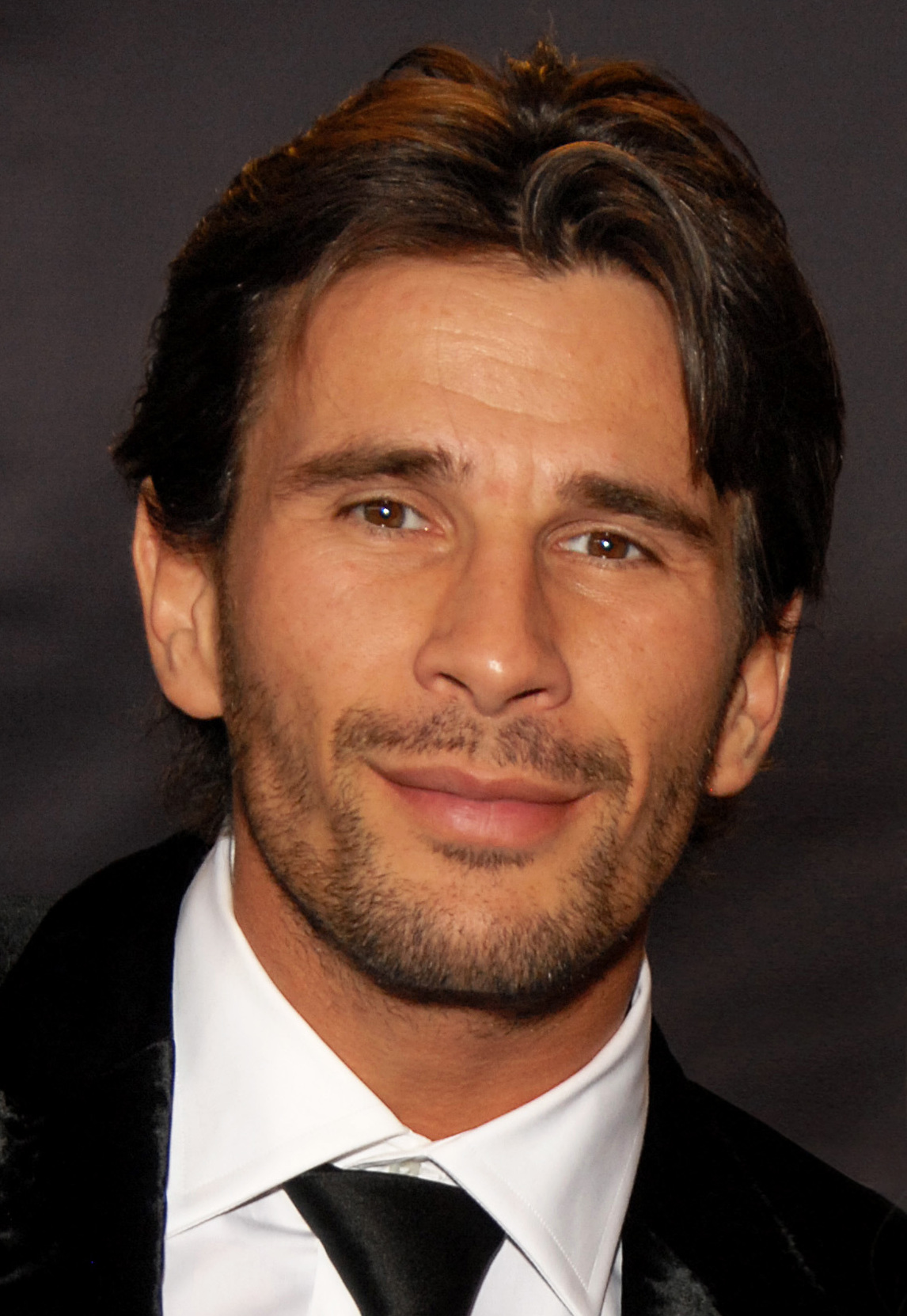
Manuel Ferrara, Male Performer of the Year winner

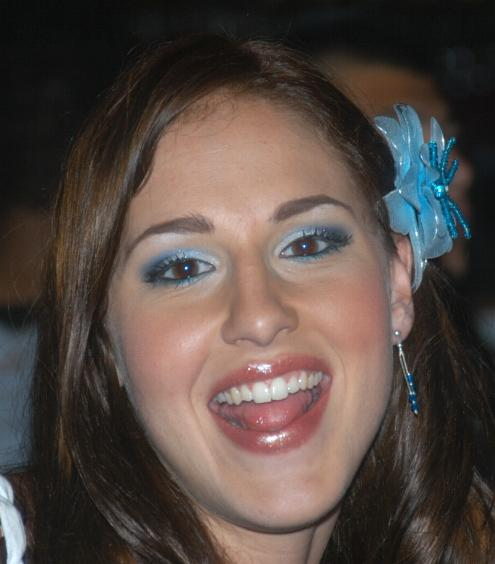
Lauren Phoenix, Female Performer of the Year

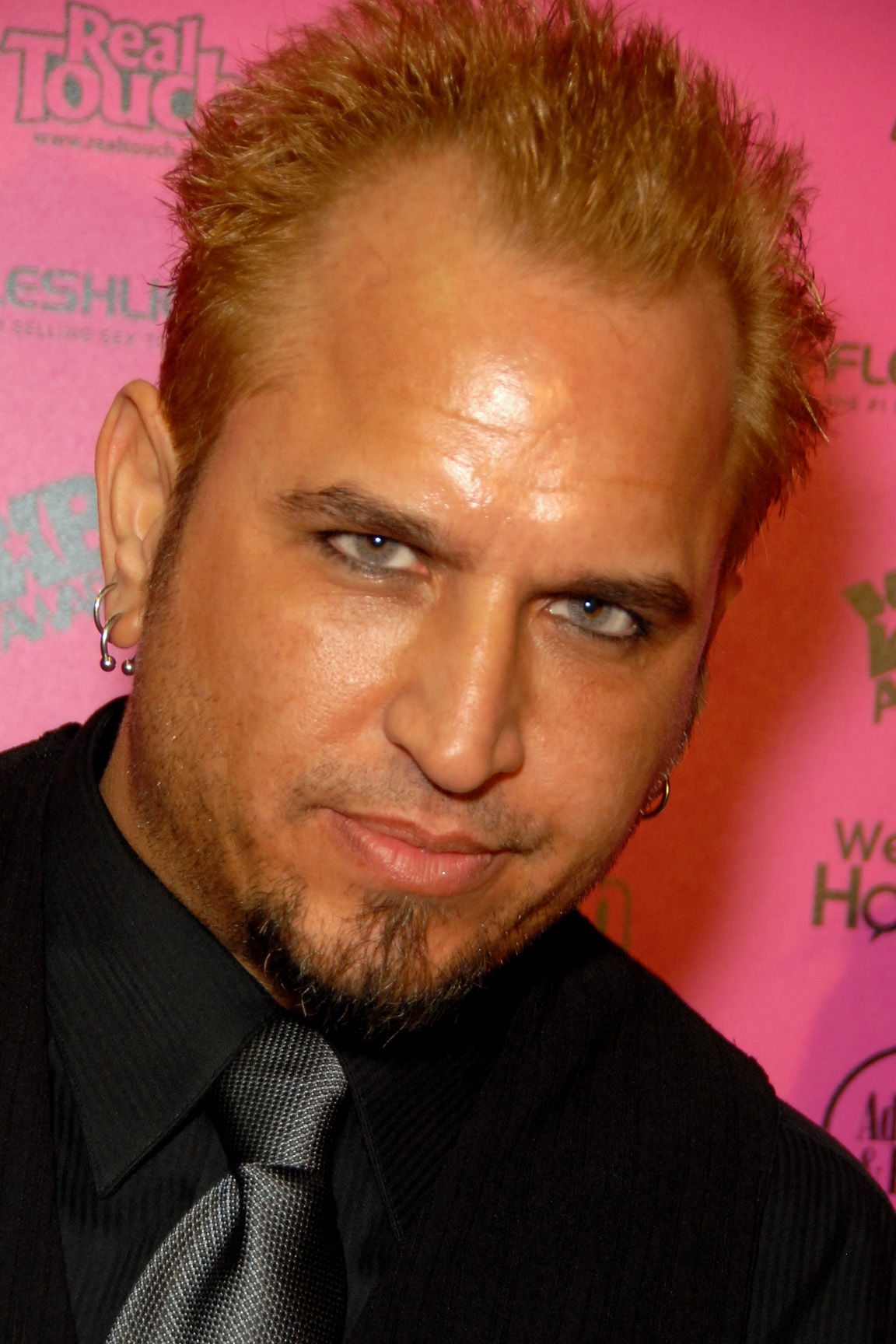
Barrett Blade, Best Actor – Video winner

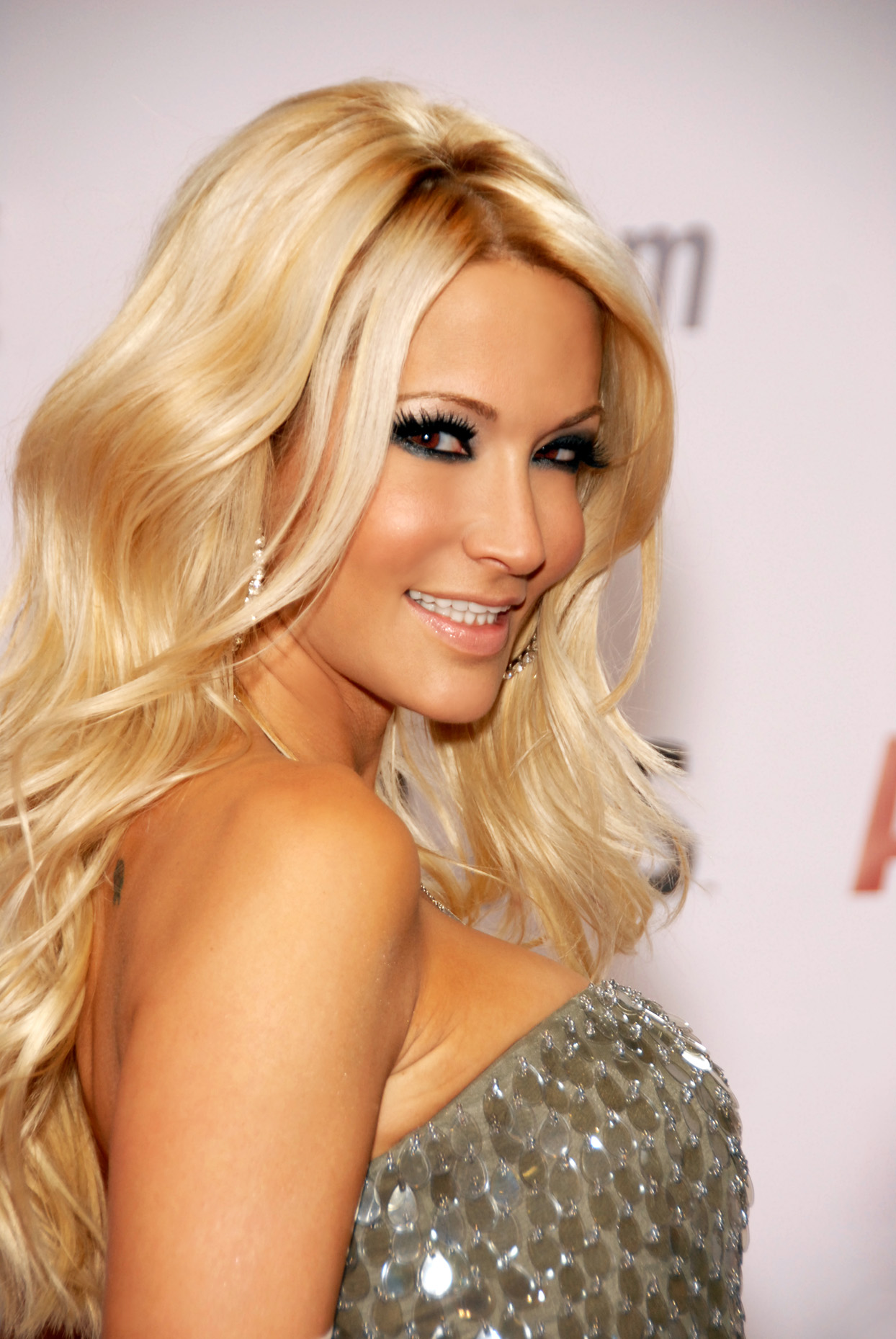
Jessica Drake, Best Actress – Video winner

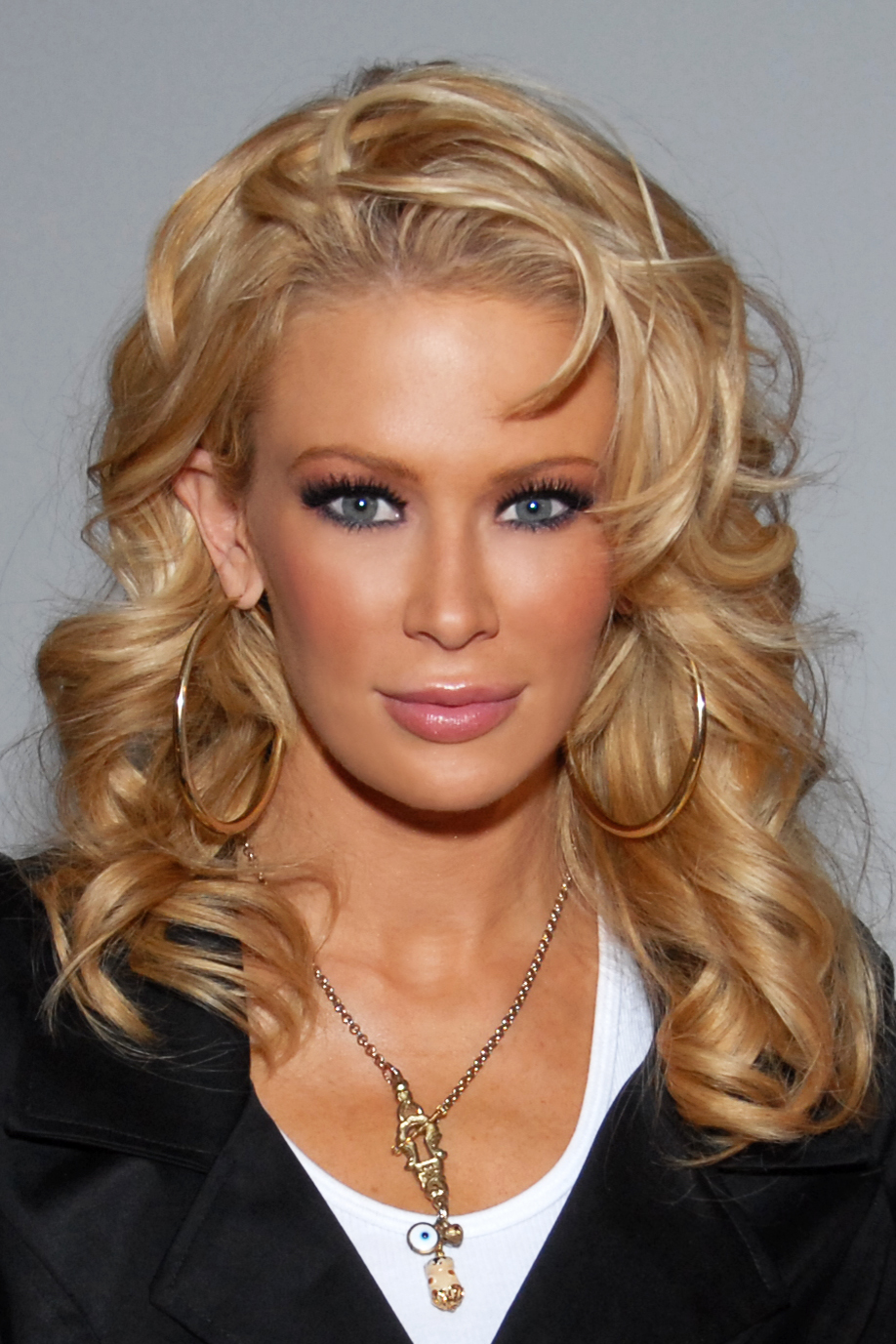
Jenna Jameson, Best Actress – Film winner

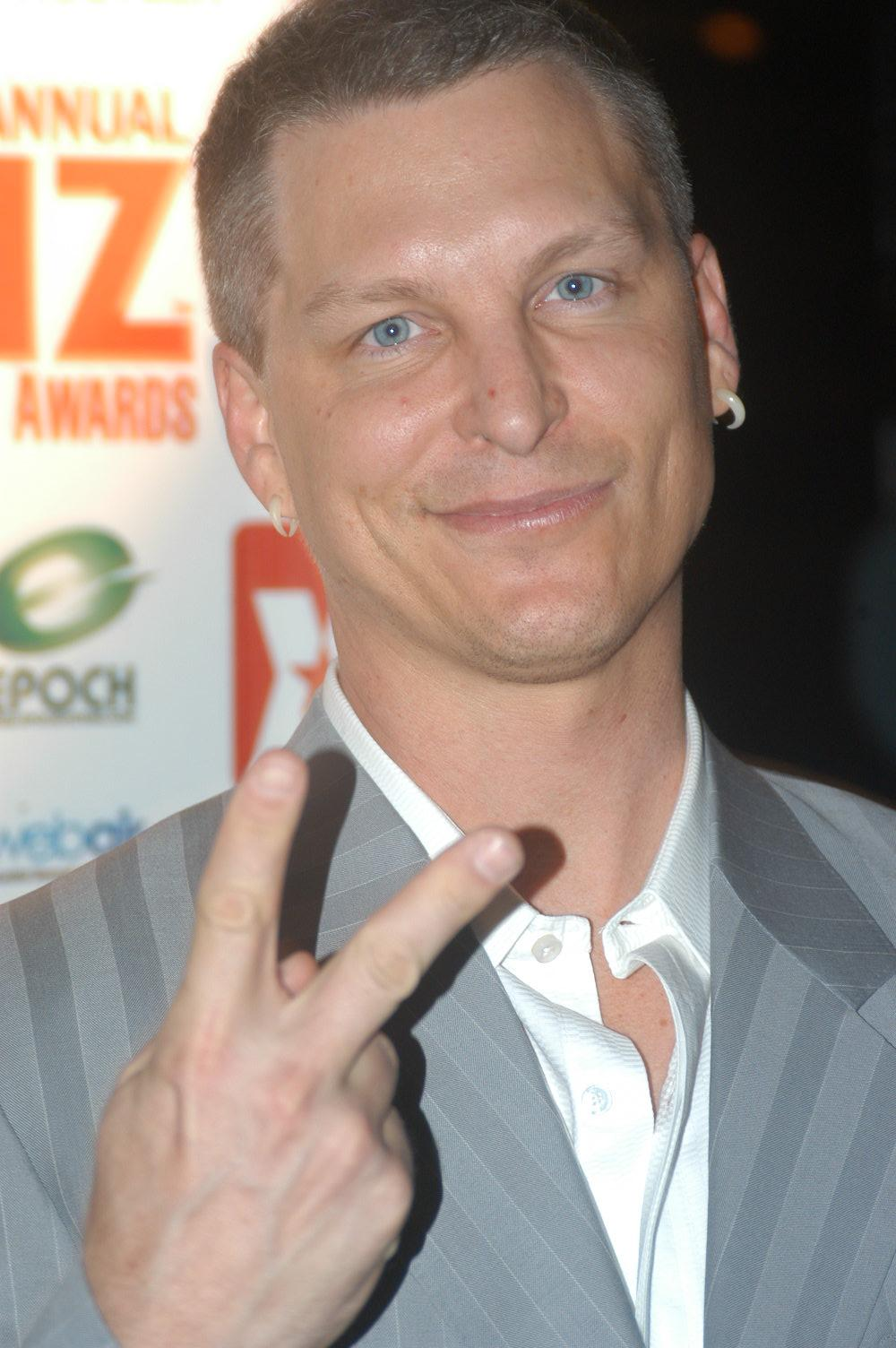
Justin Sterling, Best Actor – Film winner

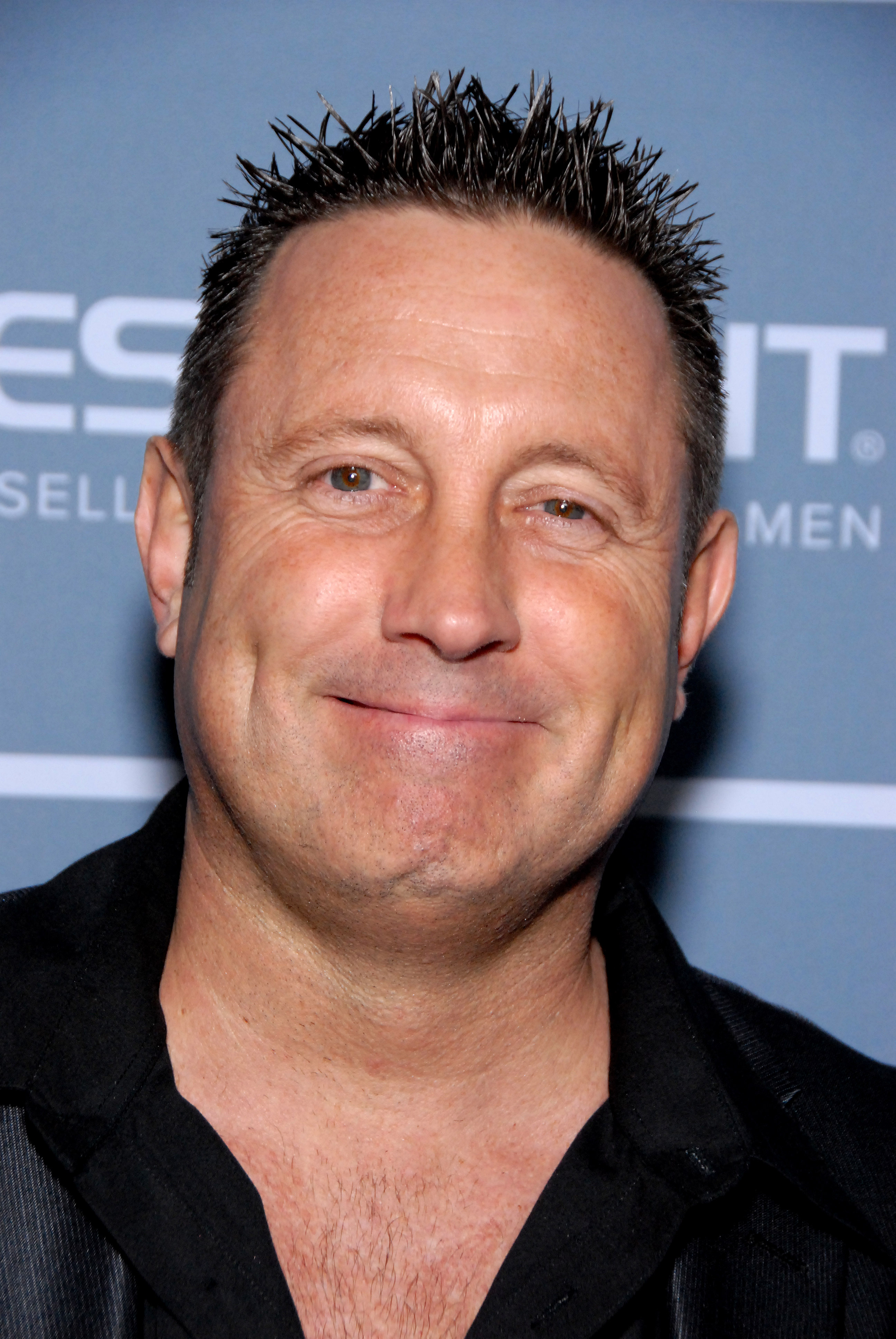
Brad Armstrong, Best Screenplay – Film winner

Winners are listed first, highlighted in boldface, and indicated with a double dagger (‡).

Best Video Feature	Best Film
**Bella Loves Jenna**‡; Café Flesh 3	**The Masseuse**‡; Debbie Does Dallas: The Revenge
Best Interactive DVD	Best New Starlet
**Groupie Love**‡	**Cytherea**‡; Audrey Hollander; Nicki Hunter; Teagan Presley; Dana Vespoli; Vicky Vette
Male Performer of the Year	Female Performer of the Year
**Manuel Ferrara**‡; T. T. Boy; Ben English; Kurt Lockwood; Mr. Marcus; Mr. Pete; Randy Spears; Michael Stefano; Evan Stone; Mark Wood	**Lauren Phoenix**‡; Ashley Blue; Cytherea; Jessica Drake; Ariana Jollee; Katja Kassin; Gina Lynn; Taylor Rain; Savanna Samson
Best Actor—Video	Best Actress—Video
**Barrett Blade, Loaded**‡; Brad Armstrong, Fluff and Fold; Joel Lawrence, Erotic Focus; Mr. Marcus, Blue Rain; Eric Masterson, Loaded; Herschel Savage, Love and Bullets; Randy Spears, Misty Beethoven: The Musical; Evan Stone, Faraway; Tony Tedeschi, Chasey's Back	**Jessica Drake, Fluff and Fold**‡; Julia Ann, Killer Sex and Suicide Blondes; Jenna Jameson, Bella Loves Jenna; Jesse Jane, Loaded; Kaylani Lei, Sweatshop; Savanna Samson, L’Affaire; Aurora Snow, Angels; Sunset Thomas, Misty Beethoven: The Musical; Michelle Wild, Hot Rats
Best Actor—Film	Best Actress—Film
**Justin Sterling, The Masseuse**‡; Eric Masterson, The 8th Sin; Evan Stone, Dual Identity; Tony Tedeschi, The 8th Sin	**Jenna Jameson, The Masseuse**‡; Sunrise Adams, Debbie Does Dallas: The Revenge; Jessica Drake, The Collector; Savanna Samson, Bare Stage
Best Director—Video	Best Director—Film
**David Stanley, Pretty Girl**‡; Brad Armstrong, Fluff and Fold; Red Ezra, The Getaway; Veronica Hart, Misty Beethoven: The Musical; Michael Ninn, In the Garden of Shadows; Antonio Passolini, Café Flesh 3; Michael Raven, Blue Rain; Jace Rocker, 30 Days in the Hole; Justin Sterling, Bella Loves Jenna	**Paul Thomas, The Masseuse**‡; Brad Armstrong, The Collector; Andrew Blake, Flirts; Bo Edwards, Dual Identity; David Stanley, Bare Stage
Best Supporting Actress—Video	Top Selling Title of the Year
**Ashley Blue, Adore**‡; Asia Carrera, Sweatshop; Chloe, Misty Beethoven: The Musical; Jessica Drake, Killer Sex and Suicide Blondes; Katie Morgan, High Desert Pirates; Rachel Rotten, Café Flesh 3; Stormy, Suspicious Minds; Lezley Zen, Fluff & Fold	**1 Night in Paris**‡
**Ashley Blue, Adore**‡; Asia Carrera, Sweatshop; Chloe, Misty Beethoven: The Musical; Jessica Drake, Killer Sex and Suicide Blondes; Katie Morgan, High Desert Pirates; Rachel Rotten, Café Flesh 3; Stormy, Suspicious Minds; Lezley Zen, Fluff & Fold	Top Renting Title of the Year
**Ashley Blue, Adore**‡; Asia Carrera, Sweatshop; Chloe, Misty Beethoven: The Musical; Jessica Drake, Killer Sex and Suicide Blondes; Katie Morgan, High Desert Pirates; Rachel Rotten, Café Flesh 3; Stormy, Suspicious Minds; Lezley Zen, Fluff & Fold	**1 Night in Paris**‡
Best All-Sex Release	Best Ethnic-Themed Release—Black
**Stuntgirl**‡	**Pimpfomation XXX**‡
Best Gonzo Series	Best Anal Sex Scene
**Jack's Playground**‡; Seymore Butts	**Katsumi, Lexington Steele, Lex Steele XXX 3**‡; Jayna Oso, Brian Surewood, The A-Line; Lauren Phoenix, Lee Stone, A.N.A.L. 3; Taylor Rain, Manuel Ferrara, Anal Perversions; Belladonna, Nacho Vidal, Bella Loves Jenna; Jessica Dee, Mick Blue, Cumback Pussy 50; Audrey Hollander, Otto Bauer, Fresh Porn Babes 4; Gia Paloma, Steve Holmes, Mr. Pete, Girlvert 5; Mandy Bright, Manuel Ferrara, One on One 2; Lyla Lei, Chris Charming, Shitty Shitty Bang Bang; Venus, Benjamin Bratt, Mark Wood, Sodomy: Law of the Land; Katsumi, Roxy Jezel, Mr. Marcus, Up Your Ass 22; Teagan Presley, Mark Ashley, Weapons of Ass Destruction 3
Best Couples Sex Scene—Video	Best Couples Sex Scene—Film
**Venus, Manuel Ferrara, Stuntgirl**‡; Anais, Kurt Lockwood, Fetish: I Know Your Dreams; Katja Kassin, Michael Stefano, Fresh Meat 18; Nicole Sheridan, Voodoo, Hustler Centerfolds; Lauren Phoenix, Manuel Ferrara, I'm Your Slut 2; Cytherea, Mark Ashley, Internal Cumbustion 3; Sabrine Maui, Lexington Steele, Invasian!; Charmane Star, Manuel Ferrara, Lessons in Lust 2; Janine, Nick Manning, Maneater; Katrina Kraven, Erik Everhard, Riot Sluts; Shawnie, Tristan Seagal, Not Just Another Teen Movie 3; Rocco Siffredi, Jewel De'Nyle, Rocco: Animal Trainer 15; Dani Woodward, Erik Everhard, Semen Sippers; Lauren Phoenix, Mick Blue, Sodomania 41	**Jenna Jameson, Justin Sterling, The Masseuse**‡; Jessica Drake, Cheyne Collins, The Collector; Sunrise Adams, Chris Charming, Debbie Does Dallas: The Revenge; Rachel Rotten, Rob Rotten, Dollhouse; Savanna Samson, Evan Stone, Sweethearts
Best All-Girl Sex Scene—Video	Best Three-Way Sex Scene—Video
**Audrey Hollander, Gia Paloma, Ashley Blue, Tyla Wynn, Brodi, Kelly Kline, The Violation of Audrey Hollander**‡; Belladonna, Catalina, The Connasseur; Belladonna, Jenna Jameson, Bella Loves Jenna; Brooke, Britney Foster, Nicki Hunter, Ly Len, Bitch; Cytherea, Tiana Lynn, Cytherea Iz Squirtwoman; Jessica Drake, Dolorian, Fluff and Fold; Jessica Jaymes, Justine, Ramona Luv, Gina Lynn's Close-Up 2; Boo D. Licious, Gina Lynn, Gina Lynn Reinvented; Felecia, Sky Lopez, High Desert Pirates; Breanne, Isabella Camille, Hook Ups 5; Francesca Lé, Dani Woodward, Pussy Galore; Jasmine, Zora Banx, Secret Delights of Baroness Kinky; Tera Patrick, Savanna Samson, Tera Tera Tera	**Dani Woodward, Barrett Blade, Kurt Lockwood, Erotic Stories: Lovers and Cheaters**‡; Cytherea, Fallon Summers, Toni Ribas, Addicted to Sex; Katrina Kraven, Lauren Phoenix, Tony T., Big Wet Asses 4; Cytherea, Lauren Phoenix, Randy Spears, Buttwoman Iz Lauren Phoenix; Cytherea, Delilah Strong, Brian Bacchus, Cytherea Iz Squirtwoman; Nadia Styles, Marco Duato, Ben English, Double Teamed; Olivia O'Lovely, Manuel Ferrara, Mario Rossi, Drop Sex 2; Teagan Presley, Mark Ashley, Alberto Rey, Flesh Hunter 7; Mandy Bright, Frank Gun, Brett Rockman, Hustler's Taboo; Monique, Michael Stefano, Steve Holmes, The Pussy Is Not Enough 2; Roxy Jezel, Cris Taliana, Dave Hardman, Pussyman's Teen Land 9; Mandy Bright, Frank Gun, Brandon Iron, Riot Sluts; Ariana Jollee, Jay Ashley, Tony T., Un-Natural Sex 11

=== Additional Award Winners ===
These awards were announced, but not presented, in two pre-recorded winners-only segments during the event. Trophies were given to the recipients off-stage:

**DIRECTOR AWARDS**

- Best Director—Foreign Release: Narcis Bosch, Hot Rats
- Best Director—Non-Feature: Jack the Zipper, Stuntgirl

**MARKETING AWARDS**

- Best DVD Packaging: Millionaire, Private North America/Pure Play
- Best Marketing Website: Evil Angel.com
- Best Overall Marketing Campaign—Company Image: ClubJenna
- Best Overall Marketing Campaign—Individual Project: 1 Night in Paris, Red Light District
- Best Retail Website: Adult DVD Empire.com and [WantedList |Wanted List.com] (tie)
- Best VHS Packaging: Island Fever 3, Digital Playground

**PERFORMER AWARDS**

- Best Male Newcomer: Tommy Gunn
- Best Non-Sex Performance: Mike Horner, The Collector
- Best Supporting Actor—Film: Rod Fontana, The 8th Sin
- Best Supporting Actor—Video: Randy Spears, Fluff and Fold
- Best Supporting Actress—Film: Lesley Zen, Bare Stage
- Best Tease Performance: Vicky Vette, Metropolis
- Female Foreign Performer of the Year: Katsumi
- Male Foreign Performer of the Year: Steve Holmes
- Transsexual Performer of the Year: Vicki Richter

**PRODUCTION AWARDS'**

- Best All-Girl Feature: The Connasseur
- Best Amateur Series: Homegrown Video
- Best Anal-Themed Feature: Big Wet Asses 3
- Best Classic DVD: Deep Throat (Remastered)
- Best Foreign Feature: Hot Rats
- Best Specialty Release/Big Bust: Francesca's Juggies
- Best Specialty Release/BDSM: Nina Hartley's Private Sessions 13

**Production (ctd.)**

- Best Sex Comedy: Misty Beethoven: The Musical

**SEX SCENE AWARDS**

- Best All-Girl Sex Scene—Film: Jenna Jameson, Savanna Samson, The Masseuse
- Best Group Sex Scene—Film: Katsumi, Savanna Samson, Alec Metro, Dual Identity
- Best Group Sex Scene—Video: Venus, Ariana Jollee, Staci Thorn, Zena, Louisa, Trinity, Jasmine, Nike, Melanie X, Bishop, D. Wise, Julian St. Jox, L.T., Mark Anthony, Tyler Knight, 2 others, Orgy World: The Next Level 7
- Best Oral Sex Scene—Film: Jessica Drake, Chris Cannon, Cheyne Collins, The Collector
- Best Oral Sex Scene—Video: Ava Devine, Francesca Le, Guy DiSilva, Rod Fontana, Steven French, Scott Lyons, Mario Rossi, Arnold Schwarzenpecker, Cum Swallowing Whores 2
- Best Sex Scene in a Foreign-Shot Production: Anna, Auxanna, Camilla, Daria, Gianna, Katia, Linda, Venus, Maria, Victoria, Rocco Siffredi, Rocco Ravishes Russia
- Best Solo Sex Scene: Penny Flame, Repo Girl
- Most Outrageous Sex Scene: Chloe, Ava Vincent and Randy Spears in “Randy's Singing Penis,” Misty Beethoven: The Musical

**TECHNICAL AWARDS**

- Best Art Direction—Film: The Collector
- Best Art Direction—Video: In the Garden of Shadows
- Best Cinematography: Andrew Blake, Flirts
- Best Editing—Film: Sonny Malone, The Masseuse
- Best Editing—Video: Justin Sterling, Bella Loves Jenna
- Best Music: Lloyd Banks, Groupie Love
- Best Screenplay—Film: Brad Armstrong, The Collector
- Best Screenplay—Video: David Stanley, Pretty Girl
- Best Videography: Barry Wood and Chris Hall, In the Garden of Shadows

=== Honorary AVN Awards ===
==== Reuben Sturman Award ====
- Harry Mohney, Déjà Vu Showgirls

==== Hall of Fame ====
AVN Hall of Fame inductees for 2005 were: James Avalon, Seymore Butts, Rod Fontana, Kylie Ireland, C. J. Laing, Francesca Lé, Mai Lin, Jim Powers, Serenity, Shane, Steven St. Croix, Taylor Wane

=== Multiple nominations and awards ===
The following releases received the most nominations.

Nominations	Movie
16	The Collector
16	The Masseuse
15	Misty Beethoven: The Musical
14	Bella Loves Jenna
13	The 8th Sin
11	Eye of the Beholder
11	Loaded
11	Millionaire
10	Café Flesh 3
10	Dinner Party 3
10	Fluff and Fold
9	Bare Stage
9	Hustler's Taboo
9	In the Garden of Shadows

The following 14 releases received multiple awards:

Awards	Movie
7	The Masseuse
4	The Collector
3	Bella Loves Jenna
3	In the Garden of Shadows
3	1 Night in Paris
3	Stuntgirl
2	Fluff and Fold
2	Groupie Love
2	Hot Rats
2	Island Fever 3
2	Millionaire
2	Misty Beethoven: The Musical
2	Pretty Girl
2	The Violation of Audrey Hollander

== Presenters and performers ==
The following individuals, listed in order of appearance, presented awards or performed musical numbers or comedy.

=== Presenters ===
Name(s)	Role
Jenna Jameson; Ron Jeremy; Krystal Steal	Presenters of the awards for Best Supporting Actress—Video, Best Threeway Sex Scene—Video and Best All-Sex Release
Brittney Skye; Jesse Jane; Devon	Presenters of the awards for Best Couples Sex Scene—Video and Best Gonzo Series
Julia Ann; Tommy Gunn; Kelly Erickson	Presenters of the awards for Best All-Girl Sex Scene—Video and Best Ethnic-Themed Release—Black
Dani Woodward	Presenter of the awards for Top Selling and Top Renting Release of 2004
Jimmy Flynt	Presenter of the Reuben Sturman Award
Savanna Samson	Introduction of the trophy girls—Keri Sable, Tyra Banxxx and RayVeness
Gina Lynn; Venus; Justin Slayer	Presenters of the awards for Best Couples Sex Scene—Film and Male Performer of the Year
Michael Stefano; Angel Cassidy; Cherokee	Presenters of the awards for Best Anal Sex Scene, Best Ethnic-Themed Series and Female Performer of the Year
Evan Stone; Tera Patrick; Tall Goddess	Presenters of the awards for Best Director—Video and Best Director—Film
Stormy Daniels	Presenter of the award for Best New Starlet
Kurt Lockwood; Jada Fire; Nautica Thorn	Presenters of the awards for Best Actor—Video and Best Actress—Video
Aurora Snow; Alexis Amore; Joanna Jet	Presenters of the awards for Best Interactive DVD and Best Actor—Film
Jessica Jaymes; Sean Michaels; Katie Morgan	Presenters of the awards for Best Actress—Film and Best Film
Taylor Wane; Steven St. Croix; Kimberly Kane; Janine	Presenters of the award for Best Video Feature

=== Performers ===
Name(s)	Role	Performed
Mark Stone and the AVN Orchestra	Musical Director/Producer	Orchestral
Olympic Gardens dancers Club Sapphire dancers Déjà Vu dancers	Performers	Go-go girls, pole dancing
Smash Mouth	Performers	Musical number, “All Star”
Thea Vidale	Performer	Standup comedy segment
Sean Michaels	Performer	Comic video vignette: "Dick Tips"
Ron Jeremy	Performer	Comic video vignette: "A True Icon"
Randy Spears; Cytherea	Performers	Comic video vignette: "Miracle of Nature"
Lit	Performers	Musical number, “My Own Worst Enemy”
Chingy	Performers	Musical number, “Balla Baby”

== Ceremony information ==
Two new categories were announced for this year's show – Best Interracial Release and Best P.O.V. Release. However, two other categories had insufficient entries to warrant a competition: Best Anal Sex Scene – Film and Adult Video Nudes, the latter for the worst release of the year. With the advent of digital video, emphasis started to shift to shot-on-video awards from shot-on-film awards. For the first time, the final award of the night was the Best Video Feature award, whereas in the past it had been the Best Film award. As well, the award for Best Supporting Actress—Video was moved on-stage into the main body of the awards show while the Best Supporting Actor—Film and Best Supporting Actress—Video awards were moved into the announcements segment with awards given off-stage.

The show was plagued by several glitches and miscues. Among them, the most noticeable one came when Sean Michaels announced the winner for Best Actress—Film as being Savanna Samson instead of the correct winner, Jenna Jameson. He and co-presenter Jessica Jaymes tried to correct the error but were drowned out by the orchestra and Samson, who, as co-host, was in the wings changing costumes, ran onstage in a towel to collect the award. When told apologetically by Jaymes of the mistake, in an epic wardrobe malfunction, Samson dropped the towel and exited naked back to the off-stage changing area.

Earlier during the show, when Lit launched into its song, "My Own Worst Enemy", Jeremy Popoff knocked over his amplifier when he started playing and the musical performance was cut short. Lit came on again at the end of the show to redo the song so it would be recorded properly for television.

Besides being recorded for broadcast on Playboy TV, a DVD of the awards show was also issued by Devil's Film.

=== Performance of year's movies ===
The Paris Hilton sex tape, 1 Night in Paris, was announced as the adult movie industry's top selling movie and the top renting movie of the previous year.

=== Critical reviews ===
London's Men's World magazine gave the show a positive review, calling comedian Thea Vidale "a hilarious host" and adding, "it was clear that the 2005 AVN Awards had been a big hit; it was quicker, slicker and better than previous years." The magazine also noted how well-dressed everyone was for the event, stating, "When the U.S. porn biz does glam, it does it 110 per cent." It concluded, "With music from Smash Mouth and rapper Chingy, it was a good evening, made better by the use of high speed video scrolls to list the many award categories that would bore an audience if they were done live (best packaging?), and little video vignettes including a comedy cracker about Ron Jeremy, which saw him playing the violin while 'factoids' popped up on-screen."

Video reviewer Denny Recob similarly enjoyed the show: "The first thing I noticed about this year's show is the comedian was outstanding. Her jokes were funny and topical and she actually knew the correct porn slang and knew the correct pronunciation of the stars' names. This is a big improvement from previous years."

== In Memoriam ==
AVN founder Paul Fishbein dedicated the show to two people who died in the previous year: Filmmaker Russ Meyer and film historian and director Jim Holliday.

== See also ==
- AVN Award
- AVN Best New Starlet Award
- AVN Award for Male Performer of the Year
- AVN Award for Male Foreign Performer of the Year
- AVN Female Performer of the Year Award
- List of members of the AVN Hall of Fame
- 2005 GayVN Awards
