= Erotic Heritage Museum =

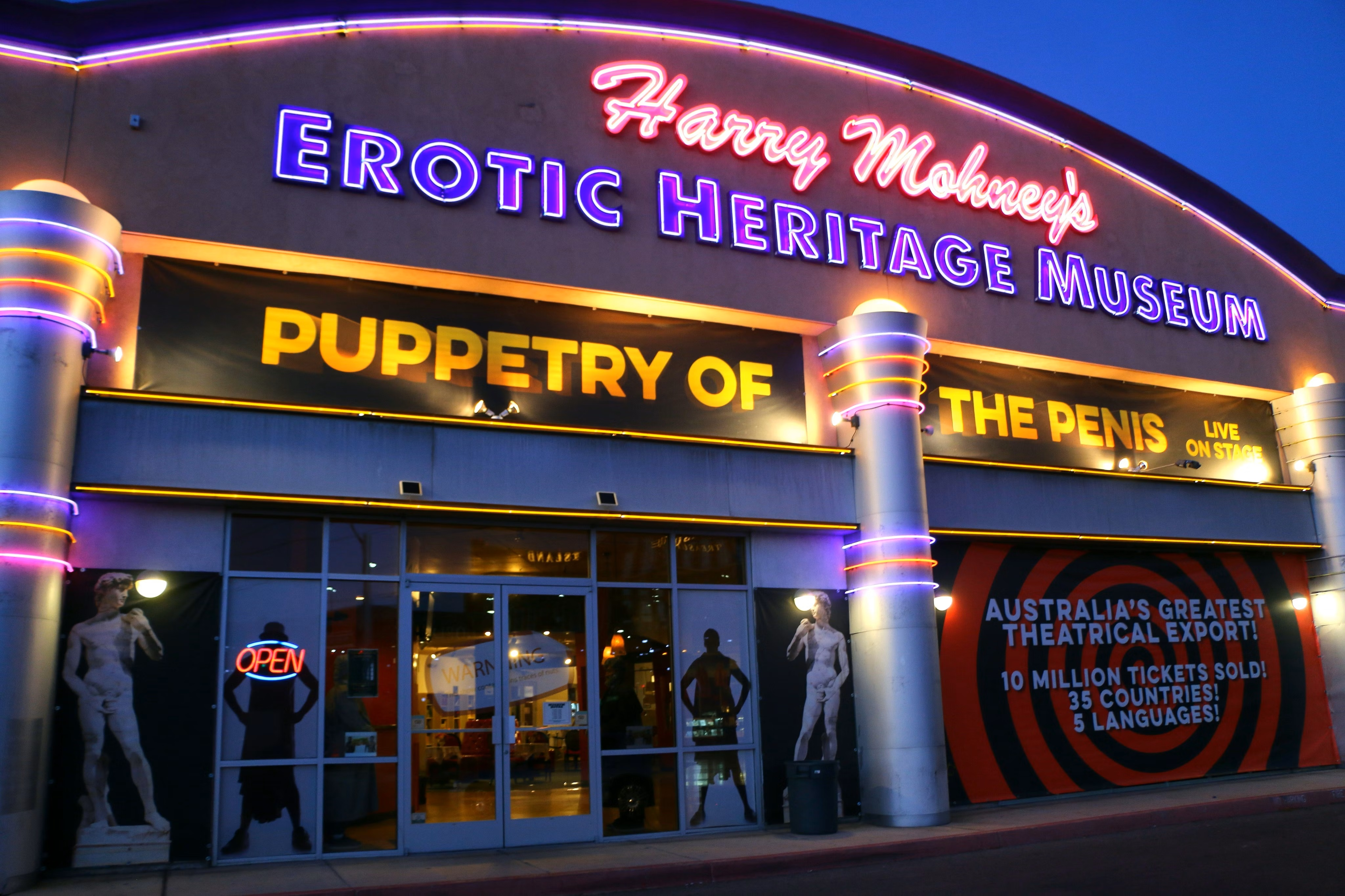
- Established: 2008
- Location: 3275 Sammy Davis Jr. Drive; Las Vegas, Nevada, 89109; United States
- Coordinates: 36.1300816°N 115.1746632°W
- Type: Erotic museum
- Directors: Victoria Hartmann, Ph.D.
- Website: www.eroticmuseumvegas.com

The Erotic Heritage Museum (EHM) is a 24,000-square-foot (2,200 m^{2}) space with 17,000 square feet (1,600 m^{2}) dedicated to the history of erotica, located in Las Vegas. The grand patron of the museum is Harry Mohney, founder of Déjà Vu. The Erotic Heritage Museum is an educational, performance, and exhibit space, where various retail items are sold in the lobby. The museum hosts readings, symposia, and "meet and greets" of notables in the world of sexual education and art.

== History ==
The museum opened on August 2, 2008, ceased operations for a brief restructuring on February 19, 2014, and reopened on June 7, 2014, as Harry Mohney's Erotica Museum. The museum is managed by Harry Mohney Erotic Museum LLC, a Nevada corporation.

== Collection ==
The Harry Mohney Erotic Museum is designed to perform educational, scientific, and literary functions relating to sexual, emotional, mental, and physical health. The museum features erotic art of multiple genres, including commercial art, pornographic art, folk art, pop art, and fine art.

The second floor is mainly devoted to erotic art, some of it available for sale. The presented pieces range from classic to abstract and include paintings, sketches, watercolors, porcelain figurines, sculptures, and carved wood objects.

== Performances ==
Since 2015, the museum has hosted Puppetry of the Penis, a nude live comedy show, up to 5 nights per week.

== See also ==
- Institute for Advanced Study of Human Sexuality
