= Hot Summer in the City =

- DVD Cover
- Directed by: Gail Palmer
- Written by: Gail Palmer
- Produced by: Harry Mohney
- Starring: Lisa Baker; Duke Johnson; Black Orchid
- Release date: July 14, 1976
- Running time: 58 minutes
- Country: United States
- Language: English
- Budget: $40,000

Hot Summer in the City is a 1976 American pornographic film about a white virgin who is abducted by a group of black militants. It was written and directed by Gail Palmer.

== Development ==
After Gail Palmer served as the manager for Cinema X, a Michigan pornographic film theater owned by Harry Mohney, and seeing the rise of porno chic which saw increased demand for more cinematic, plot-driven pornographic films such as Behind the Green Door (which had screened at the Cannes Film Festival), The Opening of Misty Beethoven, The Devil in Miss Jones and The Autobiography of a Flea (one of the rare porno films of the era that was directed by a woman), Palmer proposed that Mohney and her make their own pornographic film. Mohney told Palmer to "steal" a plot from a pornographic novel, and after she discovered a book called White Captive, she remembered writing a short story for her college's creative writing class based on a news account on the 1968 Detroit riot about a group of black youths that had kidnapped a white girl, and Palmer decided to develop a plot based on these two sources. Additionally, Palmer's plot had contained elements that had been popular requests in surveys she had distributed to the cinema patrons, of things that customers, particularly women, had wanted to see in pornography, particularly interracial sex between black and white performers, and simulated rape.

Palmer purchased a book on screenwriting and wrote a 40 page screenplay which she titled Hot Summer in the City, after the song by The Lovin' Spoonful. Palmer subsequently said that she would later find the film hard to watch because "society has changed a lot, and I’ve changed even more. I now have a much clearer idea of what rape is [...] maybe it was my repressed background, but I understood very well the fantasy of an aggressive lover, of being ravished. It took the responsibility off my shoulders. What I didn’t realize was that there’s a vast difference between a fantasy ravishment and the painful reality of rape." Palmer injected social commentary into the plot by writing a riot enacted by black militants as having been funded by white businessmen in order to collect on the insurance claim.

== Filming ==
Mohney hired a cameraman from a local television station who agreed to be the film's cinematographer on the condition of anonymity, and after his lawyer confirmed that it was legal to film pornography in Michigan, Mohney arranged for the film to be shot at a cabin he owned, with a 16mm film camera and lighting equipment Palmer borrowed from the University of Michigan, casting black students as the black militants, a massage parlor worker from Detroit named Black Orchid as one of the kidnapper's girlfriend, and Ohio dancer Lisa Baker in the role of the kidnapped girl, paying Baker $1,000 and the rest of the cast $300 each for the weekend.

The cast and crew arrived at Mohney's cabin on Friday to rehearse, and the black cast members added changes to their dialogue, criticizing the way Palmer wrote black vernacular; Duke Johnson, the lead actor, told Palmer, "We don’t say ‘pussy,’ we say ‘hole'. White guys say ‘pussy.'" Filming began with non-sex scenes being shot first; the man hired to play the part of "the White Man" was a friend of Mohney's who had difficulty remembering his lines, which had to be written on any available surface on set, including playing cards, the currency his character gave to the militants and the palm of his own hand.

After they began shooting sex scenes, Mohney and Palmer discovered that Stitch was a homosexual, which made it difficult for him to sexually perform with Black Orchid; Stitch explained that "my husband told me he thought it would be really cool" if Stitch acted in a movie. Further difficulties in trying to film cum shots led Mohney to employ a stunt penis from "Right-On Ray", a customer at Cinema X. $40,000 was spent on filming and post-production.

Credit for directing the film was given to The Hare, with Palmer later recalling, "if anybody had done anything like 'directing' on the set, it was me"; the Detroit press introduced Palmer as the director of the film at its premiere.
