= Gail Palmer =

American film director

- Born: April 4, 1955 (age 71); St. Clair, Michigan
- Occupations: Actress, producer, film director

Gail Palmer (also Gail Palmer-Slater born April 4, 1955) is an American former producer and director of pornographic movies in the U.S. during the late 1970s and early 1980s.

Among her well-known movies are Hot Summer in the City (1976) starring Lisa Baker as a white girl who is abducted and abused by a group of black men, and the comedies The Erotic Adventures of Candy (1978) starring John Holmes and Carol Connors and Candy Goes to Hollywood (1979) starring Carol Connors and the late punk singer Wendy O. Williams.

She was featured in Playboy September 1977 as a Michigan State girl, mentioned in Playboy February 1979 in "The Year in Sex", and in an article in Swank in June 1980. Also in the late 70s she had a rock band called Foreplay. Her autobiography, Candy Goes to Hollywood: the Gail Palmer Story, appeared in 1994.

She dated Harry Mohney, and after they split, she sued him in 1984 for excluding her from the profits of their movies. After splitting up with Mohney, entertainment work was harder to come by, and Gail would return to Michigan, where she met and dated a physician. The couple married in 1988.

After a visit to Hunter S. Thompson's home in 1990, she accused the writer of sexual assault; the charges were later dropped.

In the 2006 book When Elvis Meets the Dalai Lama, author Murray Silver claims to have ghostwritten Palmer's autobiography.
