= David Lourea =

American writer, AIDS activist, and bisexual rights activist (1945–1992)

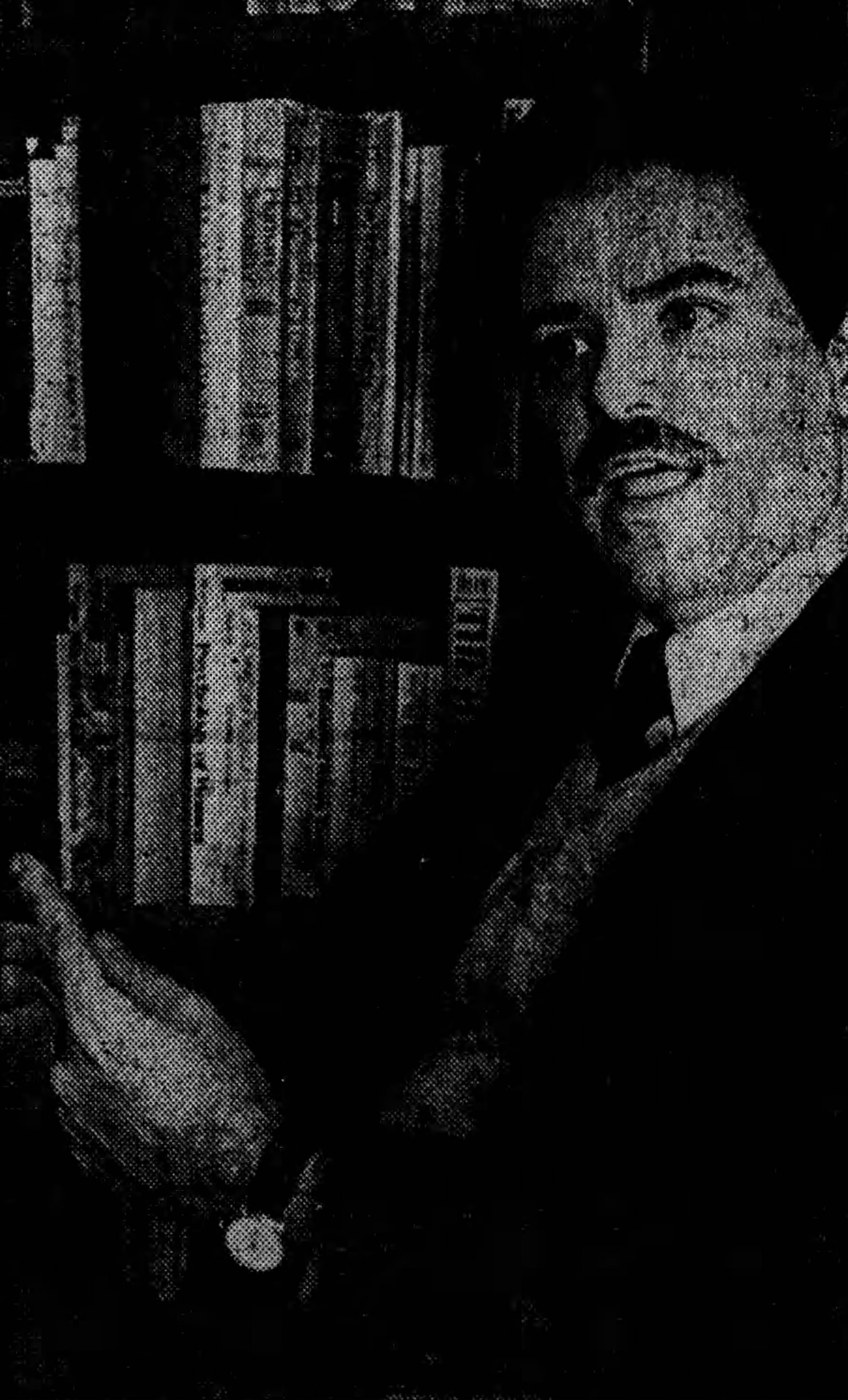
Lourea in 1984

David Nachman Lourea (August 26, 1945 – November 10, 1992) was an American writer, AIDS activist, and bisexual rights activist.

== Early life and education ==
David Lourea was born Philadelphia, Pennsylvania on August 26, 1945. He was raised Orthodox Jewish in Philadelphia, an antisemitic area at the time. Lourea later said his grandmother's encouragement to embrace his religion also made him more comfortable in his bisexuality, which he struggled with as a young man.

Lourea studied sculpture at Temple University's Tyler School of Art and Architecture and graduated with his B.A. in 1967. He later earned a Ph.D. from the Institute for Advanced Study of Human Sexuality.

== Bay Area bisexual movement ==
In 1973, Lourea and his wife Lee Olivier Lourea moved to the Bay Area seeking a bisexual community, where they met bisexual and sex-positive activists such as Maggi Rubenstein, Betty Dodson, Alan Rockway, and Lani Ka'ahumanu. He also became active with San Francisco Sex Information. Lourea and Rubenstein, along with other community activists, worked together to establish the San Francisco Bisexual Center, which opened to the public on September 23, 1976. The Center briefly operated out of Lorea's home in the North Panhandle neighborhood.

The Bi Center was heavily aligned with the sexual freedom movement, and offered a policy of inclusion, creating a space that was feminist, anti-classist, anti-racist, and trans-friendly. Its offerings included counseling and educational workshops on gender, bisexuality, and sexual health. The center also conducted advocacy work, fighting against bisexual erasure and discriminatory policies such as the Briggs Initiative, which barred gay and lesbian teachers from working in California public schools. While helping run the Bi Center, Lorea also worked as an elementary school teacher for San Francisco Public Schools.

== AIDS activism (1980's) ==
In the early 1980s, as AIDS began spreading in the LGBTQ community, Lourea and the other founders of the Bi Center shifted their focus to AIDS activism, often hosting workshops and programs on safer sex. In 1983, Lourea, Rockway, Ka'ahumanu, Rubenstein, Bill Mack, Autumn Courtney, and Arlene Krantz founded BiPOL, a LGBTQ feminist political action group. The group received national media coverage of its demonstrations near the 1984 Democratic National Convention, and pushed for bisexual visibility in politics by nominating Lani Ka'ahumanu as a vice-presidential candidate. Lourea's work including serving on Dianne Feinstein's AIDS Education Advisory Committee for the San Francisco Department of Public Health, and in 1984, after two years of campaigning, persuading the department to recognize bisexual men in their official AIDS statistics. This set a national precedent, with other U.S. health departments following suit.

The Bi Center formally closed in 1984 as its founders focused their efforts on the AIDS pandemic. Lourea studied at the Institute for Advanced Study of Human Sexuality, and began working professionally with AIDS and HIV patients to collect and publish information on the disease and its prevention, including as the founder executive director of the support group, Bisexual Counseling Services of San Francisco. He worked closely with Cynthia Slater to present safe sex education at bathouses and BDSM clubs.

Lourea continued his work as a sex educator throughout the 1980s and into the 1990s before his own death from AIDS complications.

== Death and legacy ==
On November 10, 1992, Lourea died at the age of 47 from to AIDS-related kidney failure. Author and organizer Naomi Tucker dedicated her book, Bisexual Politics: Theories, Queries, and Visions, to Lourea and his ability to inspire revolution.

Lourea's archival papers are held at the James C. Hormel LGBTQIA Center in the San Francisco Public Library.

== Publications ==
- '"Beyond Bisexual," in Bi Any Other Name: Bisexual People Speak Out, ed. Loraine Hutchins and Lani Kaʻahumanu, Boston: Alyson Pub., 1991, ISBN 1555831745.
- "Psychological aspects of bisexuality. Psycho-social issues related to counseling bisexuals", in Bisexualities : theory and research, ed. Dr. Fritz Klein and Timothy J. Wolf, New York: Haworth Press, 1985, ISBN 0866563369; also published as Journal of Homosexuality, volume 11, numbers 1/2, spring 1985.
- "HIV Prevention: A Dramaturgical Analysis and Practical Guide to Creating Safer Sex Interventions" (with Clark L. Taylor), in Rethinking AIDS prevention : cultural approaches, ed. Ralph Bolton and Merrill Singer, Philadelphia : Gordon and Breach Science Publishers, 1992, ISBN 2881245528, originally published in volume 14, numbers 2-4 of the journal Medical Anthropology.
