= Nicki Hunter =

American pornographic film actress and director (born 1979)

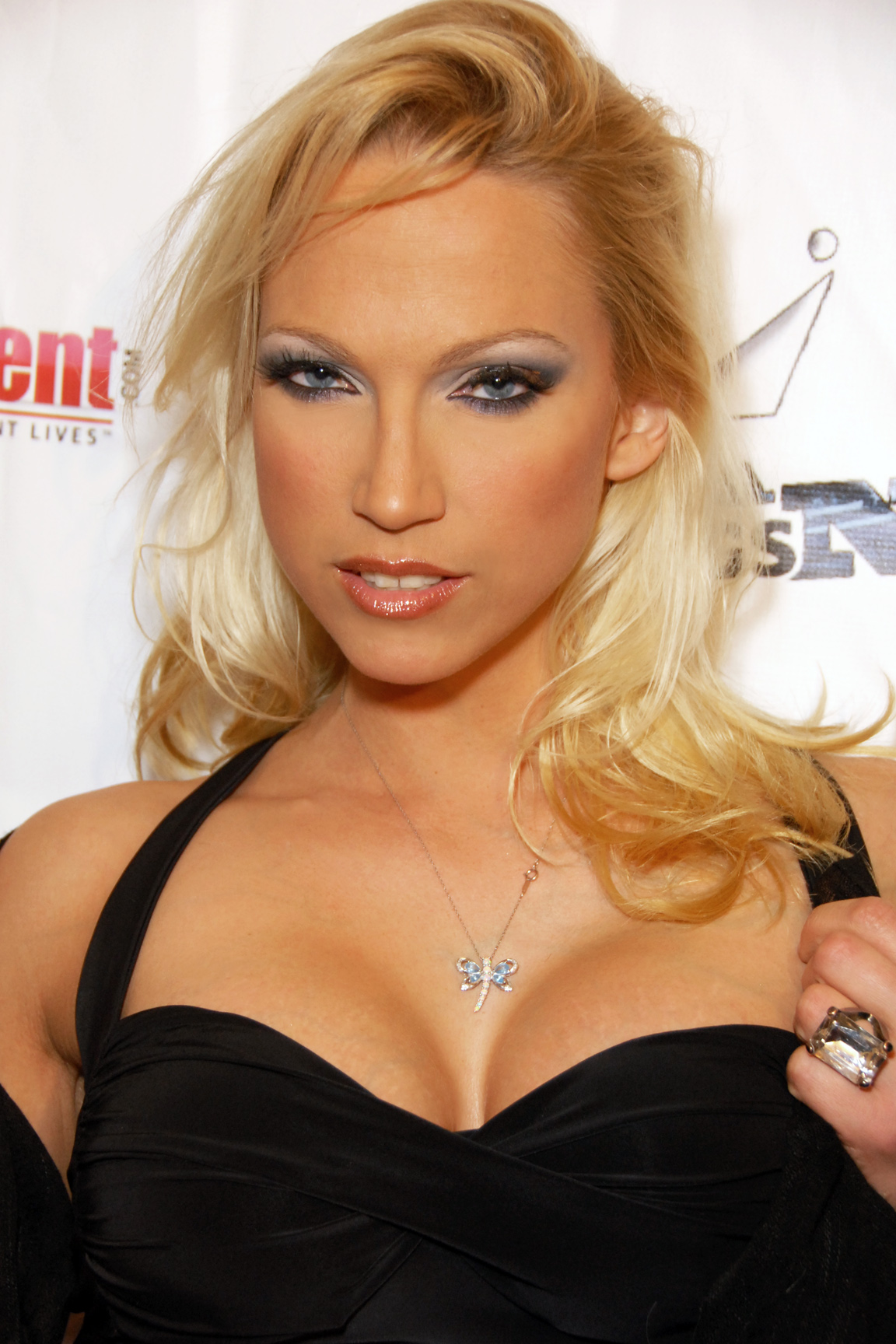
- Hunter in 2010
- Occupations: Pornographic film director; producer; make-up artist; radio personality; pornographic film actress
- Spouse: Jason Horne
- Children: 2

Nicki Hunter is an American pornographic film director, producer, make-up artist, radio personality, and former pornographic film actress.

== Career ==
Hunter made her directorial debut with the film Psychotic for Python Pictures, which was released on December 2, 2005.

In March 2010, Hunter appeared in a public service announcement for the Free Speech Coalition on the topic of copyright infringement of adult content, directed by Michael Whiteacre.

Hunter performed in pornographic films for 11 years before retiring from performing in 2014, but continues to work in the adult film industry as a director, producer, and make-up artist. She also hosts a show on Vivid Radio, SiriusXM Channel 791.

In 2004, Hunter appeared in the television documentary The Porn King Versus the President.

== Personal life ==
Hunter is married to pornographic film actor Jason Horne, with whom she has two sons.

In early 2007, Hunter was diagnosed with lymphoblastic leukemia/lymphoma (T-cell ALL), a complex form of cancer targeting the lymphatic system. Fundraising events were arranged with the help of the porn community to help offset some of her medical costs and expenses due to her suddenly being unable to work.

== Awards and nominations ==
List of accolades received by Nicki Hunter
Awards & nominations
Award	Won	Nominated
AVN Awards	2	13
NightMoves Awards	1	1
XRCO Awards	1	3
- Total number of wins and nominations
Totals	4	17
- References

AVN Awards
Year	Award	Film	Result
2005	Best New Starlet	—N/a	Nominated
2005	Best All-Girl Sex Scene – Video (with Brooke Banner, Britney Foster & Ly Len)	Bitch	Nominated
2005	Best Group Sex Scene – Video (with Nicoletta, Ben English & Manuel Ferrara)	Intensitivity	Nominated
2005	Best Group Sex Scene – Video (with Liza Harper, Gia Jordan, Rod Fontana, Arnold Schwarzenpecker, Randy Spears & Tyler Wood)	Tails From the Toilet	Nominated
2005	Most Outrageous Sex Scene	Pussy Farts	Nominated
2006	Female Performer of the Year	—N/a	Nominated
2006	Best Supporting Actress, Film	Two Hot	Nominated
2006	Best Group Sex Scene, Video (with Victoria Allure, Jenna Brooks, Lavea, Vanilla Skye, Cindy Sterling, Kelly Wells, Mark Anthony, Byron Long & Brian Pumper)	Orgy World 9	Nominated
2006	Best Solo Sex Scene	From My Ass to My Mouth	Nominated
2007	Best Supporting Actress – Video	Wild Things on the Run 3	Nominated
2007	Best All-Girl Sex Scene – Video (with Hillary Scott & Sandra Romain)	Anal Princess Diaries 2	Nominated
2010	Best Makeup (with Christi Belden, Lisa Berczel, Leonard Berczel & Julia Ann)	The 8th Day	Won
2010	Best Solo Sex Scene	Deep Anal Abyss 2	Nominated
2011	Best All-Girl Group Sex Scene (with Bobbi Starr, Kelly Divine & Clara G)	Buttman’s Evil Live	Nominated
2020	Hall of Fame	—N/a	Won

NightMoves Awards
Year	Award	Result
2005	Best New Starlet	Nominated
2010	Miss Congeniality	Won

XRCO Awards
Year	Award	Film	Result
2005	New Starlet	—N/a	Nominated
2006	Female Performer of the Year	—N/a	Won
2007	Best On-Screen Chemistry (with Haley Paige & Jack Venice)	The New Neighbors	Nominated
2009	Best Cumback	—N/a	Nominated
