= Lezley Zen =

American pornographic actress (born 1974)

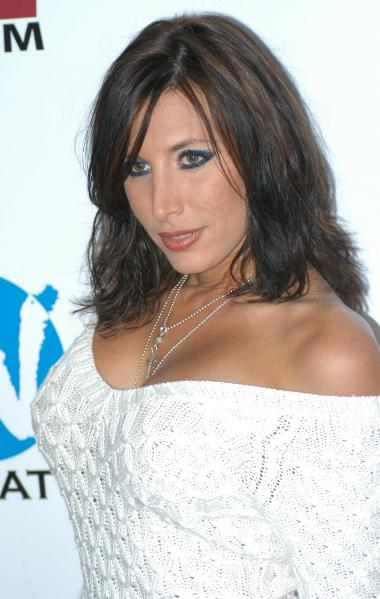
- Zen in 2006
- Born: 1974 (age 51–52); Charleston, South Carolina, U.S.
- Other name: Lezly Zen
- Occupation: Pornographic actress
- Height: 5 ft 6 in (1.68 m)
- Website: lezleyzen.com

Lezley Zen (born 1974) is an American pornographic actress.

== Early life ==
Zen was born in Charleston, South Carolina. AVN Insider stated in 2003, "This stunner is Cherokee Indian and part Irish". She attended college for three years and was in a pre-law program. She was the manager of a Westin Hotel restaurant prior to her porn career. She also worked as a bartender in Charleston for eight years.

== Career ==
She entered the adult film industry in 2001 after dancing during amateur night at a strip club where she met a porn star who was feature dancing and suggested she do porn. Her first scene was in Serenity’s Roman Orgy for Wicked Pictures.

In June 2005, Zen relocated from the San Fernando Valley to Miami and signed a non-exclusive, one-year contract with Pink TV.

== Personal life ==
Zen has two children.

== Awards and nominations ==
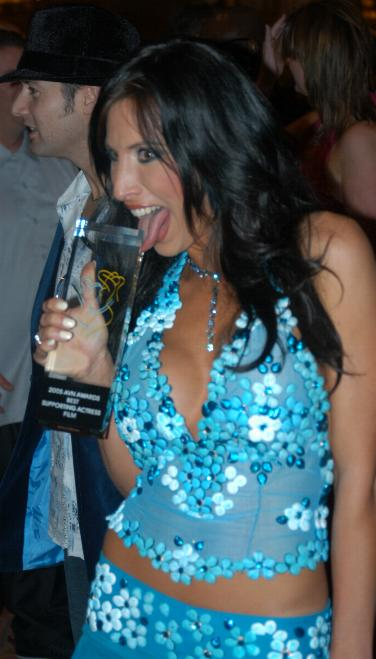
Zen holding her AVN Award for Best Supporting Actress, Film on January 8, 2005

Year	Ceremony	Result	Category	Film
2003	AVN Award	Nominated	Best New Starlet	—N/a
2004	AVN Award	Nominated	Best Oral Sex Scene – Video (with Austin O'Riley, Brandon Iron & Brian Surewood)	Throat Gaggers 3
2005	AVN Award	Won	Best Supporting Actress—Film	Bare Stage
2005	AVN Award	Nominated	Best Supporting Actress—Video	Fluff & Fold
2005	AVN Award	Nominated	Best All-Girl Sex Scene – Film (with Savanna Samson)	Bare Stage
2005	AVN Award	Nominated	Best Oral Sex Scene – Film (with Eric Masterson)	Bare Stage
2005	AVN Award	Nominated	Best Group Sex Scene-Film (with Jessica Drake & Brad Armstrong)	The Collector
2005	AVN Award	Nominated	Best Group Sex Scene-Film (with Jordan Haze & Rod Fontana)	Debbie Does Dallas: The Revenge
2005	AVN Award	Nominated	Best Group Sex Scene – Video (with Jessica Drake, Monica Sweetheart, Tommy Gunn & Trevor Zen)	Eye of the Beholder
2005	XRCO Award	Nominated	Unsung Siren	—N/a
2005	XRCO Award	Nominated	Single Performance, Actress	Bare Stage
2005	XRCO Award	Nominated	Group Scene (with Jessica Drake, Monica Sweetheart, Tommy Gunn)	Eye of the Beholder
2006	AVN Award	Nominated	Best Actress – Film	Les Bitches
2006	XRCO Award	Nominated	Best Single Performance - Actress	Les Bitches
2016	AVN Award	Nominated	Best All-Girl Group Sex Scene (with Jessica Drake, Remy LaCroix, Katrina Jade & Vicki Chase)	Massage School Dropouts
