= San Francisco Sex Information =

Sex education organization

San Francisco Sex Information (SFSI) is an organization that provides free sex information via the World Wide Web, e-mail, telephone, and online social networking. SFSI also offers a bi-annual sex educator training program and various continuing education lectures, all located in San Francisco, California.

== Mission ==
Founded in 1973 by Maggi Rubenstein, Margo Rila, and Tony Ayers as a telephone service, SFSI describes its mission as providing "free, confidential, accurate, non-judgmental information about sex and reproductive health."

The organization answers about 3,000 phone calls and about twice as many emails every year.

== Graduates ==
Since its inception, SFSI's Basic Sex Educator training program has graduated over 1,900 trainees.

Graduates of its training program include Isadora Alman, Joani Blank, Dossie Easton, Susie Bright, Patrick Califia, Sybil Holiday, Andrea Nemerson, Carol Queen, David Lourea, Veronica Monet, Midori and Violet Blue.

== See also ==
- American Journal of Sexuality Education
- Institute for Advanced Study of Human Sexuality
