= Electronic Journal of Human Sexuality =

Defunct American academic journal

- Discipline: Sexology
- Language: English
- Edited by: Peter B. Anderson

Publication details
- History: 1998–2014
- Publisher: David S. Hall for the Institute for Advanced Study of Human Sexuality (United States)
- Frequency: Continuous
- Open access: Yes

Standard abbreviations
- ISO 4: Electron. J. Hum. Sex.
- NLM: Electronic J Hum Sex

Indexing
- ISSN: 1545-5556
- LCCN: 2001243260
- OCLC no.: 44230072

Links
- Journal homepage

The Electronic Journal of Human Sexuality was a peer-reviewed academic journal that published articles, dissertations, theses, posters, and other academic materials about all aspects of human sexuality. It was published by David S. Hall for the Institute for Advanced Study of Human Sexuality, beginning in 1998 until 2014, with 17 volumes in total. The founder and original editor-in-chief of the journal was David S. Hall (Institute for Advanced Study of Human Sexuality), who later was succeeded as editor by Peter B. Anderson Walden University).

== Abstracting and indexing ==
The journal was abstracted and indexed in CINAHL and Scopus.
