= Maggi Rubenstein =

American activist for bisexual rights (1930–2024)

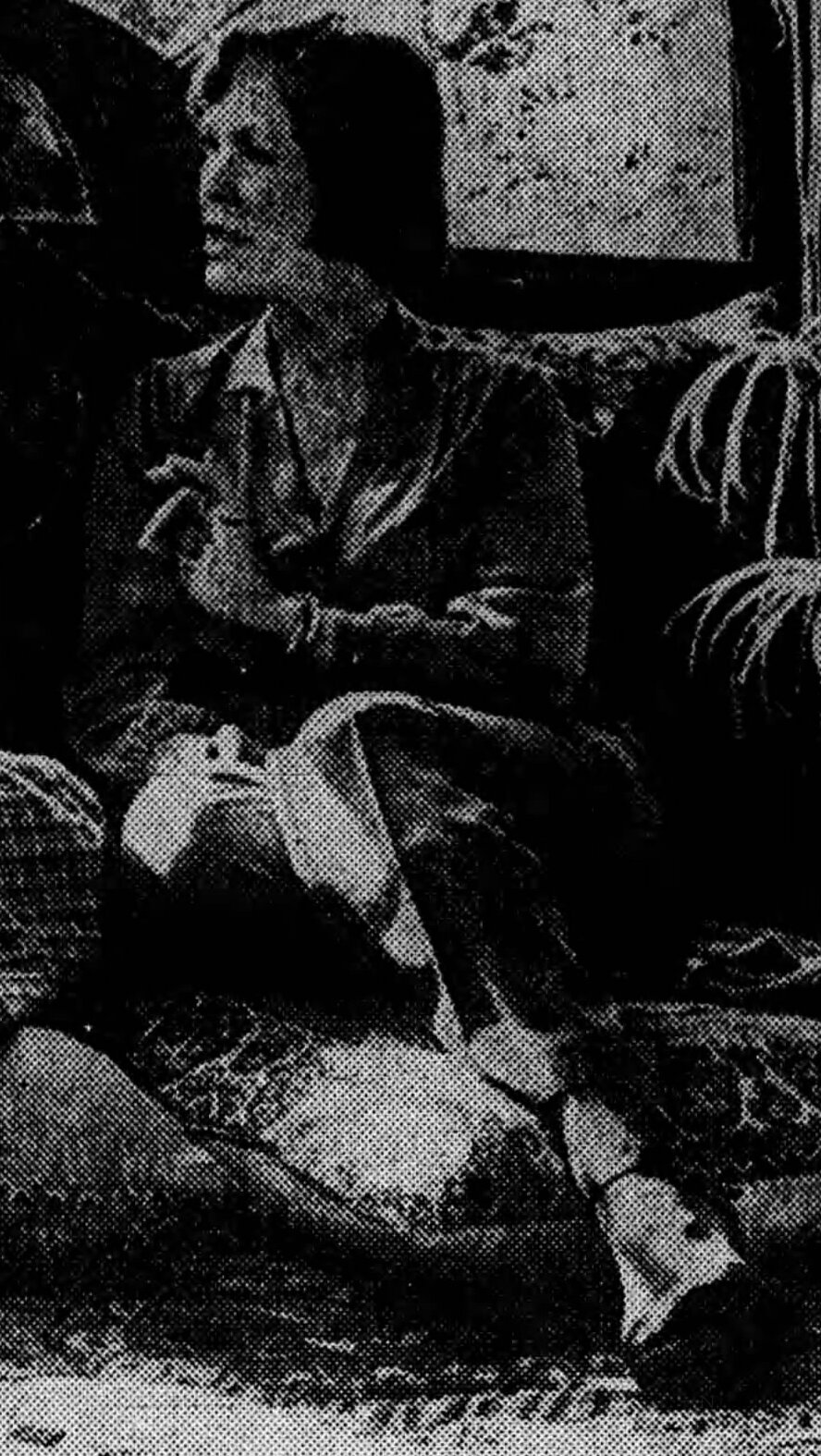
- Rubenstein in 1984
- Born: Marguerite Rubenstein; 1930; San Francisco Bay Area, California, US
- Died: August 19, 2024 (aged 93–94); Red Bluff, California, US
- Occupation: Sexologist
- Known for: Bisexual advocacy and sex education

Marguerite Rubenstein (1930–2024) was an American sexologist and activist for bisexual rights. According to articles in Common Ground and the Bay Area Reporter, she has been described as the "godmother of sex education".

== Early life and education ==
Marguerite Rubenstein was born in 1930 and raised in the San Francisco Bay Area. She received degrees in nursing and counseling, the latter from the University of San Francisco. She received a doctorate in sex therapy from the Institute for Advanced Study of Human Sexuality.

== Career and activism ==
Rubenstein began her career as a nurse. She worked at the Center for Special Problems in San Francisco, where she supported sexual minorities and transgender people. She then worked as a counselor in a private practice for 40 years, eventually focusing on sex therapy. While working with the Sex Counseling Program at the University of California, San Francisco, Rubenstein introduced bisexuality into the curriculum. After receiving her doctorate, she served as a faculty member at the Institute for Advanced Study of Human Sexuality.

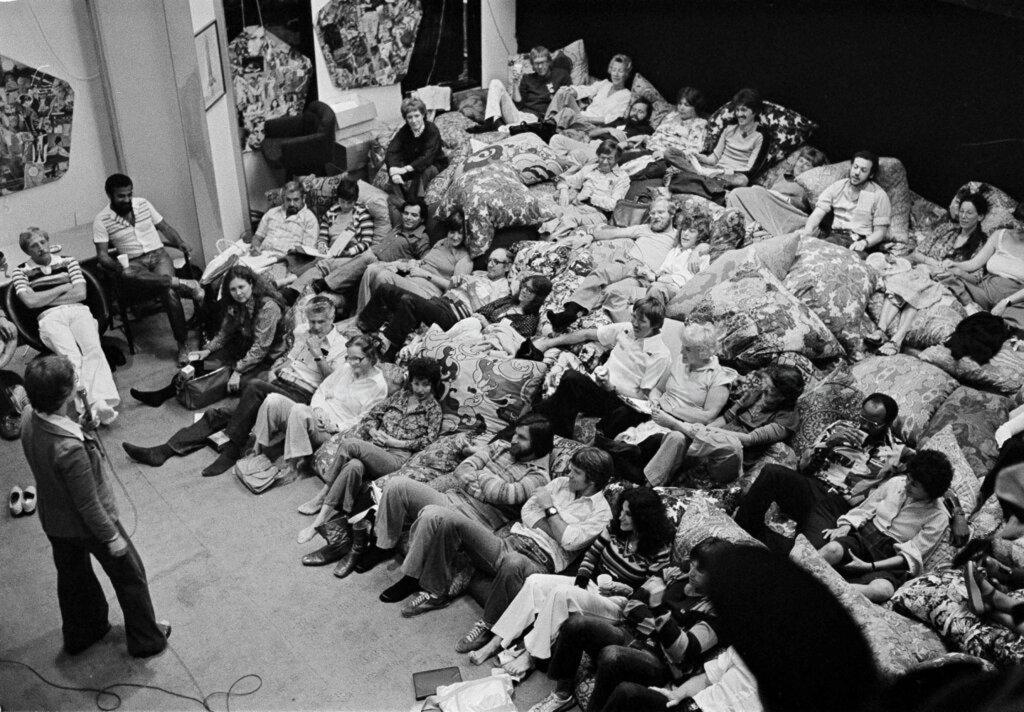
Rubenstein conducting a lecture at the Institute for Advanced Study of Human Sexuality in 1978

After coming out as bisexual in the 1960s, Rubenstein became a vocal activist for bisexual rights, often highlighting biphobia in homosexual advocacy throughout the 1970s and 1980s. She became known for yelling "and bisexual!" when people discussed gays and lesbians without mentioning bisexuals. In 1972, she began teaching about basic sexuality at the National Sex Forum at Glide Memorial Church. These trainings eventually led to the development of the Institute for Advanced Study of Human Sexuality in 1976. In the same year, she co-founded San Francisco Sex Information (SFSI) with Toni Ayres and Carolyn Smith. The organization provided confidential information about sex via telephone. SFSI eventually developed a website, becoming the first organization to share sex education online. Through this work, Rubenstein was influential in sex-positive sex education, including what became known as the "San Francisco model of AIDS education". Also in the 1970s, Rubenstein co-founded the SF Bisexual Center with Harriet Levi (sometimes spelled Leve), which was headquartered in the house of American writer and LGBT activist David Lourea. She was also a board member for the Council on Religion and the Homosexual. Early in the AIDS epidemic, Rubenstein recognized that the disease was likely transmitted via sex and thus, advocated for increased condom use. In the early 1980s, she co-founded the first and oldest bisexual political organization BiPOL, with Autumn Courtney, Lani Kaʻahumanu, Arlene Krantz, David Lourea, Bill Mack, and Alan Rockway. She also co-founded the Mobilization Against AIDS. After the SF Bisexual Center closed in 1985, Rubenstein co-founded the Bay Area Bisexual Network with Lani Kaʻahumanu and Ann Justi in 1987.

Rubenstein was active in the Harvey Milk Democratic Club.

== Honors ==
In 1992, Rubenstein was honored as the Community Grand Marshal at San Francisco Pride. In 2010, she received the Harry Britt Lifetime Achievement Award for her advocacy, then in 2020, received the GLBT Historical Society's History Makers Award.

== Personal life ==
Rubenstein was married twice, then came out as bisexual in 1969. When she came out to her mother, her mother said she wished Rubenstein "was a lesbian because all they do is hug". From the 1960s until her retirement, she lived in Glen Park, San Francisco. She moved to Northern California in 2017.

Rubenstein died in Red Bluff, California, on August 19, 2024.
