= Institute for Advanced Study of Human Sexuality =

Unaccredited graduate school in California, US

Coordinates: 37°47′19″N 122°25′26″W

- Type: Private unaccredited for-profit graduate school
- Active: June 8, 1976–2018
- President: Ted McIlvenna
- Location: San Francisco, California, United States

The Institute for Advanced Study of Human Sexuality (IASHS) was a private, for-profit graduate school and resource center for the field of sexology in San Francisco, California. It was established in 1976, lost accreditation in 2014 and closed in 2018. Degree and certificate programs focused on public health, sex therapy, and sexological research.

The institute developed out of research in the 1960s highlighting the general lack of understanding and formal training in human sexuality. Its library and archives were a collection of adult films, academic sexological and erotological resources, and sex therapy training materials.

Like all post-secondary schools in California, IASHS was required by California law to register with the State of California Bureau for Private Postsecondary Education (BPPE), an anti-fraud, anti–diploma mill unit of the California Department of Consumer Affairs. IASHS had BPPE "approval to operate", which means that IASHS met the minimum legal standards for "offering bona fide instruction by qualified faculty". That approval was discontinued in 2014. In 2017, the institute's attempt to restart operations was denied.

== History ==
In 1962 a program called the National Young Adult Project (NYAP) was established by the Methodist Church. NYAP eventually evolved into an ecumenical movement that included the Evangelical United Brethren and Presbyterian Church USA denominations, as well as the United Church of Christ denomination on a national level. There were also other churches (African Methodist Episcopal, American Baptist, Lutheran Church Missouri Synod, Protestant Episcopal, United Presbyterian Church in the US, and Lutheran Church of America) that participated on a regional or local level as well. Ted McIlvenna headed the San Francisco project for the NYAP and was also a Methodist minister. McIlvenna believed that there was a lack of research on human sexuality and an absence of demonstrably effective training and educational methodologies.

A meeting in 1967 at the Kinsey Institute for Sex Research led to the formation of the National Sex Forum as part of the Glide Foundation to address this lack of needed research and training. The NYAP developed 50+ nationwide projects by 1968, but only three of those connected to McIlvenna and to Glide Memorial Methodist Church had anything to do with sexuality or issues related to sexuality. The National Sex Forum's mission was to educate the public about human sexuality, via 16mm films, operating under many names, including: the Sexual Attitude Restructuring series, the National Sex and Drug Forum, the Exodus Trust, Multi-Focus, Inc., and the Multi-Media Resource Center, which acted as a distributor. In 1968, Phyllis Lyon began a career with National Sex Forum.

By 1974, it was clear to the forum that a free-standing institute dedicated to the study of and education and training in the emerging field of sexology was required. They divided the work of creating the academic institute as follows: McIlvenna was to re-envision the Forum as an academic setting; Laird Sutton was tasked with establishing a graphic-resources library; Herbert Vandervoort was assigned to organize and prepare the academic work of the study team; and Marguerite Rubenstein, Loretta Haroian, and Phyllis Lyon were charged with designating the professional training standards for the new academically trained professional sexologists. Wardell Pomeroy was chosen as the first Academic Dean.

All of this effort was part of the process that resulted in the founding of the Institute for Advanced Study of Human Sexuality (IASHS). Ted McIlvenna (1932-2018), became co-founder, owner, and president of the institute.

The institute was to be integral to the development of humanistic sexology, emphasizing experiential techniques and sexual pleasure over positivist empiricism. The culture of casual as well as clinical nudity and the inclusion of various bodywork and erotic massage techniques led to the institute being nicknamed "Hot Tub University" or "F**k U" by some critics. The inclusion of Reichian therapy and other scientifically unfounded techniques also led to criticism.

The institution was never accredited, but it was approved from 2010 until shortly before its closure by the California Bureau for Private Postsecondary Education (BPPE), meaning that IASHS was not a fraudulent diploma mill. In July 2014, the BPPE sent a Notice to Comply to IASHS regarding several violations, for problems such as failing to properly disclose the full cost, providing outdated and incomplete information about courses and instructors, and not telling prospective students that the school was unaccredited. In early 2016, the California Bureau for Private Postsecondary Education fined IASHS for of these seven violations. After two months IASHS was required by CA SB1247 to seek and obtain accreditation. Two years later, the institute closed.

In 2015, BPPE issued a fine and Order of Abatement to IASHS. In 2016, the BPPE (1) issued a second fine and Order of Abatement to IASHS and (2) the BPPE declined to renew the approval of IASHS to grant degrees and certificates.

== Academics ==
Degrees offered by IASHS were a Master of Human Sexuality, Master of Public Health in Human Sexuality, and Doctor of Human Sexuality, as well as a Doctor of Education and Doctor of Philosophy degrees with a focus in sexology and erotology. The institute also offered professional certificates.

Coursework varied by degree program, but included formal academic lectures, group-based discussion, video lectures and webinars (which could be undertaken off-site as part of a distance education program), and hands-on training in therapy and bodywork. Research-based degrees included independent or directed use of the institute's extensive primary and secondary archives of sexological material.

=== Accreditation ===
The institute was never accredited, but was approved from 2010 until shortly before its closure by the California Bureau for Private Postsecondary Education (BPPE). The BPPE was an anti-fraud agency focused on diploma mills in California, rather than an academic accrediting agency.

Quackwatch identified the institute as a "Questionable Organization". In a 2014 news article about the institution, IASHS founder, Dr. Ted McIlvenna stated: "We don't take federal money and that's why we won't be accredited by the traditional state agencies. We don't want to be handcuffed as to what we can provide, say and do. We've been approached by accrediting bodies run by Mormons and Roman Catholics that wanted us to change our code of ethics to promote contraception and change our name to reflect 'family and marriage counseling' instead of sexuality. We won't do it."

== Activities ==
In addition to its educational and archival mission, the institute engaged in various forms of outreach, including sex education to under-served teenagers in demographic areas at high risk for pregnancy. Ted McIlvenna, president of the institute, favored a curriculum focusing on teaching teenagers techniques for "obtaining healthy, respectful relationships with their partners" rather than abstinence-only sex education. The institute produced safe sex books, videos, and assorted paraphernalia. The archives included hundreds of thousands of adult films, as well as documents tracing the development of sexology as a field of research and training, as well as educational materials. Collectively, these items comprised one of the most comprehensive sexological and erotological resource centers in the world.

IASHS established the Erotic Heritage Museum in Las Vegas (in partnership with Harry Mohney), which displayed a revolving selection of films, sculptures and other forms of art at the Erotic Heritage Museum. The museum is presently owned and managed by Harry Mohney.

The institute favored open discussions of sexuality, including such issues as oral sex, masturbation, homosexuality, BDSM, informed consent, teen sex and pregnancy, as well as sex therapy. Roger Libby, adjunct professor, sex therapist, and author of The Naked Truth About Sex: A Guide to Intelligent Sexual Choices for Teenagers and Twentysomethings, encouraged the use of extensive pre-sex discussions to set parameters and establish comfort levels for sexual engagement.

Charles Moser, chair of IASHS Department of Sexual Medicine, has argued that paraphilias and BDSM should be removed from the Diagnostic and Statistical Manual of Mental Disorders (DSM).

Bri Watson obtained the Erotic Archive of the Institute for Advanced Study of Human Sexuality.

== Electronic Journal of Human Sexuality ==
The institute published the Electronic Journal of Human Sexuality each year until its final issue in 2014. Articles were reviewed by the editorial board with supplemental review by readers.

== Notable alumni ==
Category:Institute for Advanced Study of Human Sexuality alumni

- Lindsey Doe – Sexologist and YouTuber (born 1981)
- Del Martin – American feminist and gay-rights activist (1921–2008)
- Sharon Mitchell – American sexologist and pornographic actress (born 1950s)
- Annie Sprinkle – American pornographic actress and sex educator (born 1954)
- Tina Schermer Sellers, Seattle Pacific University
- Reece Malone, MPH, DHS, Antioch University Seattle
- Rafineè Butler Hashi, Saint Mary's College of California
- Clifford J. Scheiner, MD, Emergency Medicine, Brooklyn, editor, The Essential Guide to Erotic Literature, Encyclopedia of Erotic Literature

== See also ==
- San Francisco Sex Information
- History of erotic depictions
- Digital Transgender Archive
