= Cytherea (actress) =

American pornographic film actress and model

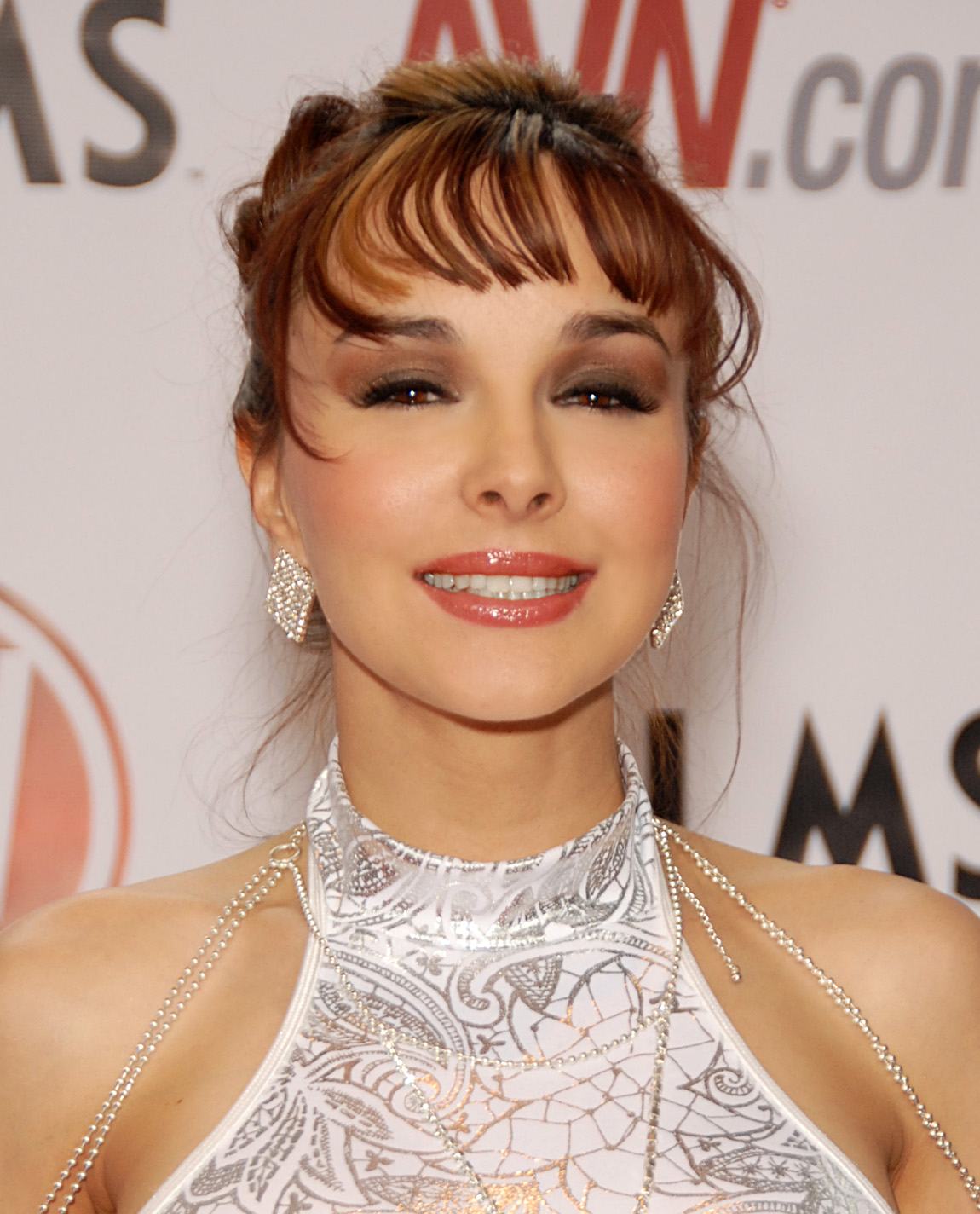
- Cytherea in 2011
- Born: Salt Lake City, Utah, U.S.
- Other names: Cynthia; Cytheria; Cyntherea; Sytheria; Cythera; Cyntheria
- Occupations: Pornographic film actress; model
- Spouse: Timothy Hale (died 2016)
- Children: 2

Cytherea is an American pornographic film actress and model. She is known for her ability to ejaculate (known as "squirting" in the adult industry) while performing sex acts.

== Career ==
Cytherea took her stage name from the Greek goddess of love, beauty, and music. She originally had a Yahoo! fan group when she was recruited by an agent into the adult industry. Her video career started in 2003, and she has performed in over 350 movies. Her first scene was with Tyce Bune for I've Never Done That Before 14. Elegant Angel produced a series of movies featuring her dubbed as "Squirtwoman". Cytherea performed her first anal scene in the movie Cytherea's Anal Whores in 2006.

In 2005, she received the AVN Best New Starlet Award. She made her feature dancing debut at The Gentlemen's Club in Charlotte, North Carolina, also in that year. Cytherea formed a production company called Cytherea Productions in 2004.

In 2012, Cytherea signed with Ideal Image Management for representation, returning to performing after a brief stint in 2010–11 after a nearly four-year hiatus.

In 2014, Cytherea announced her intentions to crowdfund her return to the adult industry. She stated that since retiring from the industry in 2005, she has been a stay-at-home mother to her two children. She also stated that she has had plastic surgery done in order to prepare herself for her return.

=== Appearances ===
She has appeared on cable television shows, most notably the HBO/Cinemax series Sex Games: Vegas, Playboy TV's Night Calls and has been a guest on the Tom Leykis Show and The Howard Stern Show.

Cytherea also hosted an industry talk and interview radio show on KSEX in Los Angeles, California called Goddess of Gush. According to her website, the show was cancelled in 2006 and Cytherea has toured as a feature dancer in the past.

She has also had minor roles in a variety of movies such as the thriller Tumbling After and the comedy film Finishing the Game: The Search for a New Bruce Lee, both in 2007, and the cable television series Sex Games Vegas in 2005.

== Personal life ==
Cytherea was born in Salt Lake City, Utah. She is a former Mormon.

Cytherea's house was invaded and robbed in January 2015, which involved a sexual assault by three armed men. Police believed the house was selected at random. Cytherea, her husband, and her two children were all home at the time.

She was married to Timothy Hale. Hale died at the age of 52 on November 2, 2016.

== Awards and nominations ==
AVN Awards
Year	Result	Award	Film
2004	Nominated	Best Sex Scene Coupling – Video (with Mark Ashley)	Barely Legal 40
2005	Won	Best New Starlet	—N/a
2005	Nominated	Female Performer of the Year	—N/a
2005	Nominated	Best Couples Sex Scene – Video (with Mark Ashley)	Internal Cumbustion 3
2005	Nominated	Best Group Sex Scene – Video (with Flower Tucci, Mari Possa, Aria & Julian)	Anal Surprise Party
2005	Nominated	Best Group Sex Scene – Video (with Roxanne Hall, Frank Gun & Arnold Schwartzenpecker)	Cytherea Iz Squirtwoman
2005	Nominated	Best All-Girl Sex Scene – Video (with Tiana Lynn)	Cytherea Iz Squirtwoman
2005	Nominated	Best Threeway Sex Scene – Video (with Delilah Strong & Brian Bacchus)	Cytherea Iz Squirtwoman
2005	Nominated	Best Threeway Sex Scene – Video (with Fallon Summers & Toni Ribas)	Addicted to Sex
2005	Nominated	Best Threeway Sex Scene – Video (with Lauren Phoenix & Randy Spears)	Buttwoman Iz Lauren Phoenix
2005	Nominated	Best Solo Sex Scene	Bob's Videos 184
2006	Nominated	Best All-Girl Sex Scene – Video (with Sandra Romain)	Cousin Stevie’s Pussy Party 7
2006	Nominated	Best Solo Sex Scene	Scuba Squirters
2006	Nominated	Most Outrageous Sex Scene (with Rodney Moore)	I Survived a Rodney Blast 3
2007	Nominated	Most Outrageous Sex Scene (with Flower Tucci, Angela Stone, Kat, Felony, Lexi Love & Mark Davis)	The Great American Squirt Off
2008	Nominated	Best All-Girl Sex Scene, Film (with Melisande)	X

XBIZ Awards
Year	Result	Award
2013	Nominated	Performer Comeback of the Year

XRCO Awards
Year	Result	Award	Film
2004	Won	Teen Cream Dream	—N/a
2005	Nominated	New Starlet	—N/a
2005	Nominated	Single Performance, Actress	Squirtwoman
2012	Nominated	Best Cumback	—N/a
