= Déjà Vu (company) =

U.S. company

Deja Vu Services, Inc.
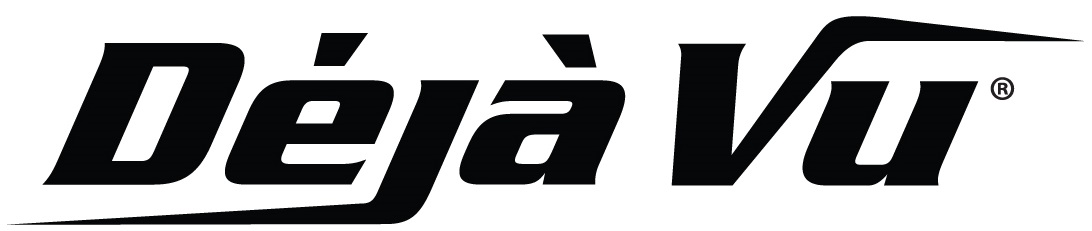
- Formerly: Deja Vu Consulting, Inc. / Deja Vu, Inc.
- Type: Private Corporation
- Industry: Adult Entertainment
- Founded: 1968
- Founder: Harry Mohney
- Headquarters: Las Vegas, Nevada, USA
- Number of locations: 200+
- Area served: International
- Revenue: $400M+ Annually
- Number of employees: 8,000+
- Website: www.dejavu.com

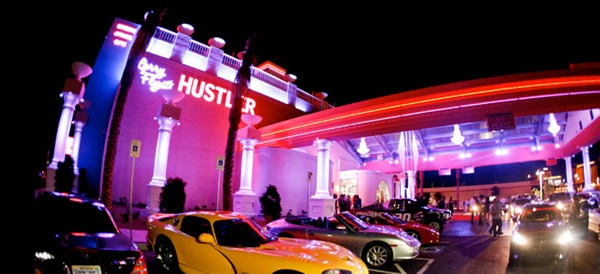
Hustler Club in Las Vegas, Nevada

Deja Vu Services, Inc., is an American company that operates nearly 200 strip clubs in the United States, United Kingdom, Australia, France, Canada, and Mexico.

It also operates a large chain of adult retail stores, adult websites, adult production studios, gay bars, nightclubs, sports bars, karaoke bars, restaurants, and has substantial real estate holdings.

As the largest strip club operator in the world, it is also one of the largest adult businesses in history. Its flagship locations in Las Vegas and Tijuana are the largest adult nightclubs in the World.

The company is headquartered in Las Vegas, Nevada. It was founded by Harry Mohney, who opened his first Deja Vu Showgirls club in Lake City, WA, in 1985 with partners Larry Flynt and Roger Forbes. Deja Vu had a humble beginning when Mohney secured employment in the early 1960s as a projectionist at a drive-in movie theater in Durand, Michigan, later converting the failing enterprise into the infamous "Durand Dirties" drive-in porn theater. The company quickly grew to over 300 adult theaters and stores nationally. Mohney pioneered the concept of the modern strip club in 1971, opening various "go-go" bars in the Midwest. An elusive man often referred to as the "Howard Hughes of Porn," Mohney was the largest distributor of pornography from the late '60s to the mid '90s, grossing nearly $1 billion in the distribution business between 1970 and 1998. That business largely concluded with Mohney serving three years in federal prison for tax-related crimes. While he was indicted over 100 times, this was the only charge that ever resulted in a conviction.

While Deja Vu's clubs operate under nearly 30 brand names, many are called Deja Vu Showgirls, Little Darlings, Dream Girls, Larry Flynt's HUSTLER Club, or HUSTLER's Barely Legal Club. Mohney's long-time friend, Larry Flynt, licensed Deja Vu the brand names for the HUSTLER Clubs and HUSTLER Hollywood stores, but was not involved in their operations. Deja Vu has monopolies or near-monopolies in many areas, including San Francisco, Washington State, and Tijuana, Mexico. The clubs typically aim for a clean and upscale atmosphere and offer fully nude or topless stage dancing as well as lap dances.

Deja Vu clubs are widely known for hosting industry-wide contests, including Showgirl of the Year, Pole Princess, and Showgirl Spectacular. Its publicity stunts and charity events at various clubs often garner international media attention.

Legal filings have indicated that Deja Vu’s affiliated entities have “ownership or controlling interest” in the real estate of more than 60% of the licensed adult entertainment clubs and stores in California. Its other noteworthy real estate holdings include most of Bourbon Street in New Orleans and a large portion of the real estate zoned for adult entertainment in many major cities in Minnesota, Florida, and Ohio.

Deja Vu's operation also includes a large chain of adult retail stores with nearly 60 locations. Those businesses also operate under a variety of trade names, including HUSTLER Hollywood, The Love Boutique, Adult Emporium, and Pleasure Emporium. They sell adult merchandise such as sex toys, lingerie, DVDs, etc., with most also featuring adult theaters and arcades.

Deja Vu's Erotic Heritage Museum in Las Vegas is a non-profit educational museum that features the world's largest collection of historical erotica, sexual artifacts, antique sexual devices, and one-of-a-kind exhibits, with nearly 30,000 feet of exhibition and education space. Its grand patron is Harry Mohney, with many items borrowed from his expansive personal collection.

While Deja Vu does not publicize all of its assets, various newspaper articles and legal filings have disclosed investment in an array of companies, including various adult video production studios and websites, popular gay bars like The Gay 90's, renowned nightclubs like The World-Famous Cat's Meow, and even national restaurant chains like Dick's Last Resort.

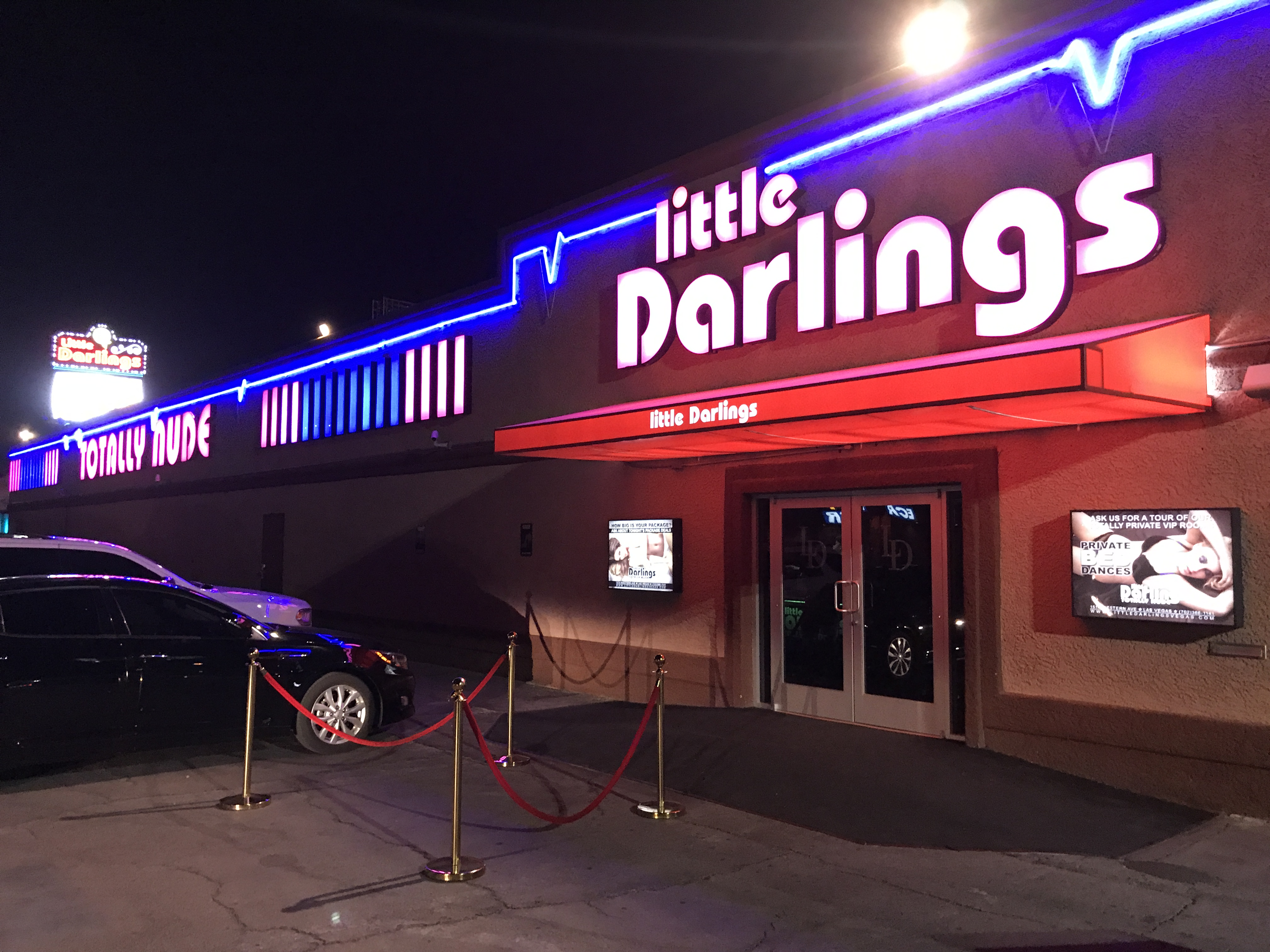
Little Darlings in Las Vegas, Nevada

The company is also known for having operated various businesses that set various landmark First Amendment Supreme Court decisions, including Miller v. California, Marks v. United States, City of Los Angeles v. Alameda Books, Inc., and Barnes v. Glen Theater, Inc.

== Awards ==
- 1998 Exotic Dancer Award – Club Chain of the Year
- 1999 Exotic Dancer Award – Club of the Year (Midwest) – Lansing, Michigan
- 1999 Exotic Dancer Award – Club of the Year (Southwest) – Ontario, California
- 1999 Exotic Dancer Award – Industry Innovator of the Year – Harry Mohney
- 2000 Exotic Dancer Award – Club Chain of the Year
- 2001 Exotic Dancer Award – Club Chain of the Year
- 2001 Exotic Dancer Award – Club of the Year (Northwest) – Seattle, Washington
- 2002 Exotic Dancer Award – Club Chain of the Year
- 2003 Exotic Dancer Hall of Fame – Harry Mohney
- 2004 Exotic Dancer Award – Club Chain of the Year
- 2006 Exotic Dancer Award – Club Chain of the Year
- 2008 Exotic Dancer Award – Club Chain of the Year
- 2008 Exotic Dancer Award – General Manager of the Year – Sherry Cooper (Industry, California)
- 2008 Exotic Dancer Hall of Fame – Jim St. John
- 2008 FSC Legacy Award – Harry Mohney
- 2009 Exotic Dancer Award – Club Chain of the Year
- 2010 Exotic Dancer Award – Club Chain of the Year
- 2011 Exotic Dancer Award – Club of the Year (Southeast) – Nashville, Tennessee
- 2012 Exotic Dancer Award – Club Chain of the Year
- 2013 Exotic Dancer Award – Club of the Year (Midwest) – Lansing, Michigan
- 2013 Exotic Dancer Award – Club of the Year (Northeast) – New York, New York
- 2013 Exotic Dancer Award – Club of the Year (West) – San Francisco, California
- 2013 Exotic Dancer Award – General Manager of the Year – Ken DeGori (San Francisco, California)
- 2013 Exotic Dancer Award – DJ of the Year – Jon Harmon (San Francisco, California)
- 2014 Exotic Dancer Award – Club of the Year (East) – Lexington, Kentucky
- 2014 Exotic Dancer Award – Club of the Year (West) – San Francisco, California
- 2015 Exotic Dancer Hall of Fame – Joe Carouba
- 2015 Exotic Dancer Award – Club of the Year (East) – Baltimore, Maryland
- 2015 Exotic Dancer Award – Club of the Year (Central) – Washington Park, Illinois
- 2015 Exotic Dancer Award – Club Employee of the Year – Ashely Sponsler (San Francisco, California)
- 2015 Exotic Dancer Award – DJ of the Year – Jay Crowley (San Francisco, California)
- 2016 Exotic Dancer Award – Club of the Year (West) – San Francisco, California
- 2016 Exotic Dancer Award – Club of the Year (Southwest) – San Francisco, California
- 2017 Exotic Dancer Award – Club of the Year (Central) – Dallas, Texas
- 2017 Exotic Dancer Award – Club of the Year (West) – Las Vegas, Nevada
- 2018 Exotic Dancer Award – Club Chain of the Year
- 2019 Exotic Dancer Award – Club of the Year (South) – Nashville, Tennessee
- 2019 Exotic Dancer Award – Club of the Year (Central) – Dallas, Texas

== See also ==
- List of strip clubs

== Sources ==
- Sex Trade Workers Organize, by Rebecca Kavoussi
- Stripping, a First Hand Account
- Collection of newspaper articles about Harry Mohney
- Battle of the Peeps, by Jay Allen Sanford
- Justice for Strippers, SFist, 2005-12-12
