= Hustler Club =

Bar chain in the US

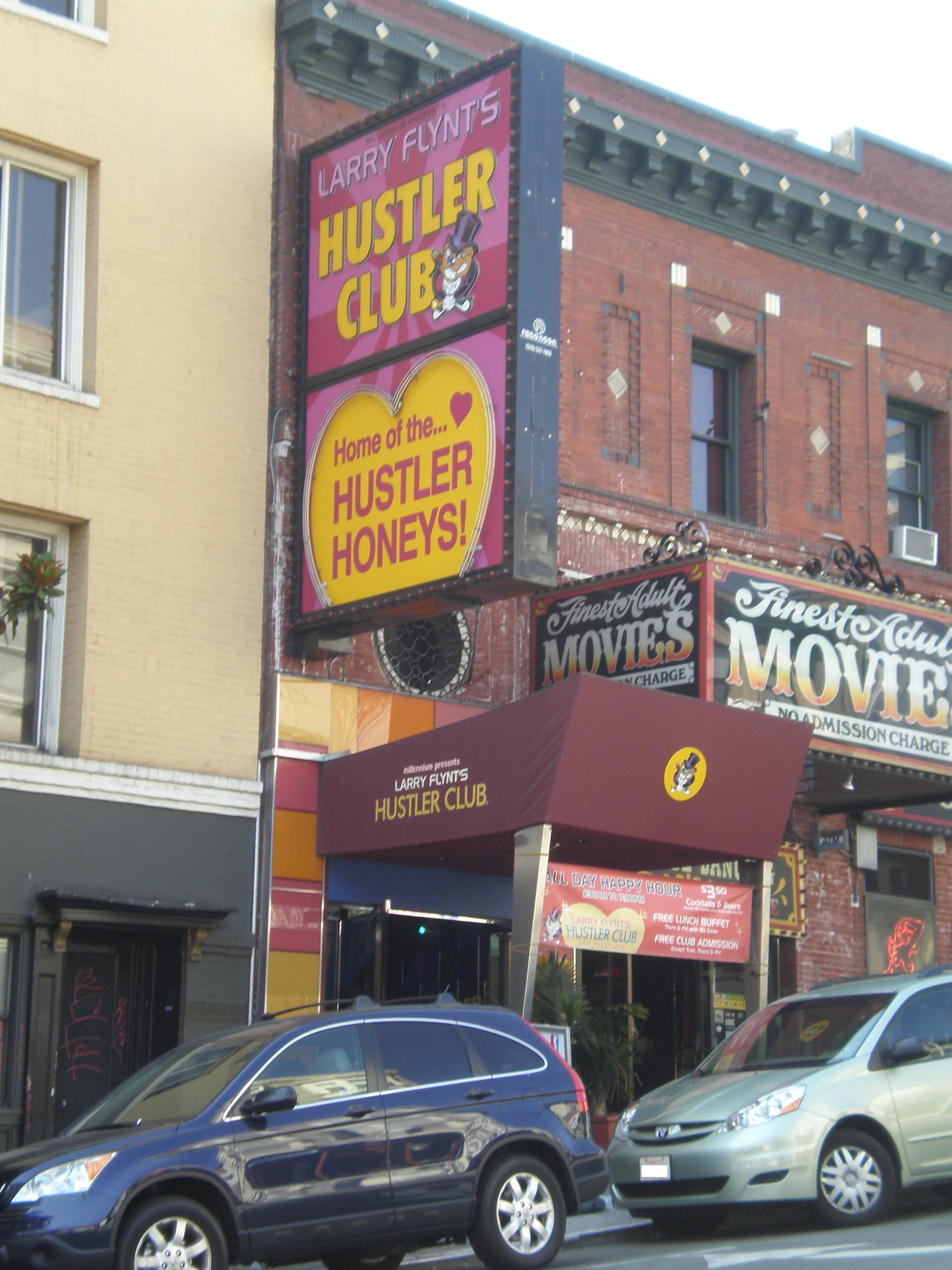
- The Hustler Club in San Francisco
- Industry: Go-go bar
- Founded: 1965; 61 years ago in Dayton, Ohio, United States
- Founder: Larry Flynt
- Number of locations: 14

The Hustler Club is a series of bars and chain of go-go clubs licensed by Hustler magazine publisher Larry Flynt.

== Early history ==
Flynt was discharged from the Navy in 1964 where he had served as a radar operator. After this stint in the Navy he worked in manufacturing jobs including one at a General Motors factory in Dayton, Ohio. In 1965, with $1,800 in savings, he made a down payment on a bar in one of Dayton's working-class neighborhoods. He specifically targeted working class patrons for his new bar by setting up horseshoe stakes and picnic tables and naming it Hillbilly Haven. Because of this, Flynt significantly increased the bar's sales. By the end of 1965, Flynt was able to buy a second bar, and, the following year, a third. Both were similar in approach and customer base to Hillbilly Haven.

Flynt opened a fourth bar named Whatever's Right. He purposely made this bar different from his earlier ventures. He sought to make this bar a "more elegant atmosphere" and geared it more to affluent and upscale male patrons. The club featured a dance floor and attractive hostesses whose job was to dance with patrons. These dancing hostesses were a huge success. In 1968, Flynt took this hostess idea a step further by opening the first Hustler Club which features semi-clothed girls. He figured that if fully clothed girls resulted in good sales, then semi-clothed girls would make great sales. His thoughts were right and the one Hustler Club in Dayton quickly creating a chain of clubs with the same name in Cincinnati, Columbus, Cleveland, Toledo, and Akron. Flynt sold his first two bars to focus on his Hustler Clubs and by early 1970, he had eight clubs and 300 employees.

== Closing ==
Flynt began publishing the Hustler Newsletter containing information about his various clubs. By 1974 the Hustler Newsletter had morphed into the full-fledged magazine, Hustler. A year into publishing Hustler the magazine was grossing more than $500,000 per issue. Later that same year with publishing profits far surpassing those of the Hustler Clubs, Flynt decided to get out of the bars business and be a publisher full-time.

== Rebirth ==
For close to 30 years the Hustler Club name lay dormant. In the early 2000s, Larry Flynt Publications began to license the Hustler Club name for new clubs across the country to Deja Vu, its partner in the pornography distribution business. At the opening of Hustler Club - San Francisco in March 2002 where Flynt was in attendance he said "there's a difference between style and class. We want this club to be about class." There are Hustler Clubs in six states and four countries. The brand continues to be expanded by Deja Vu, opening a new Hustler Club in Nashville in 2020.

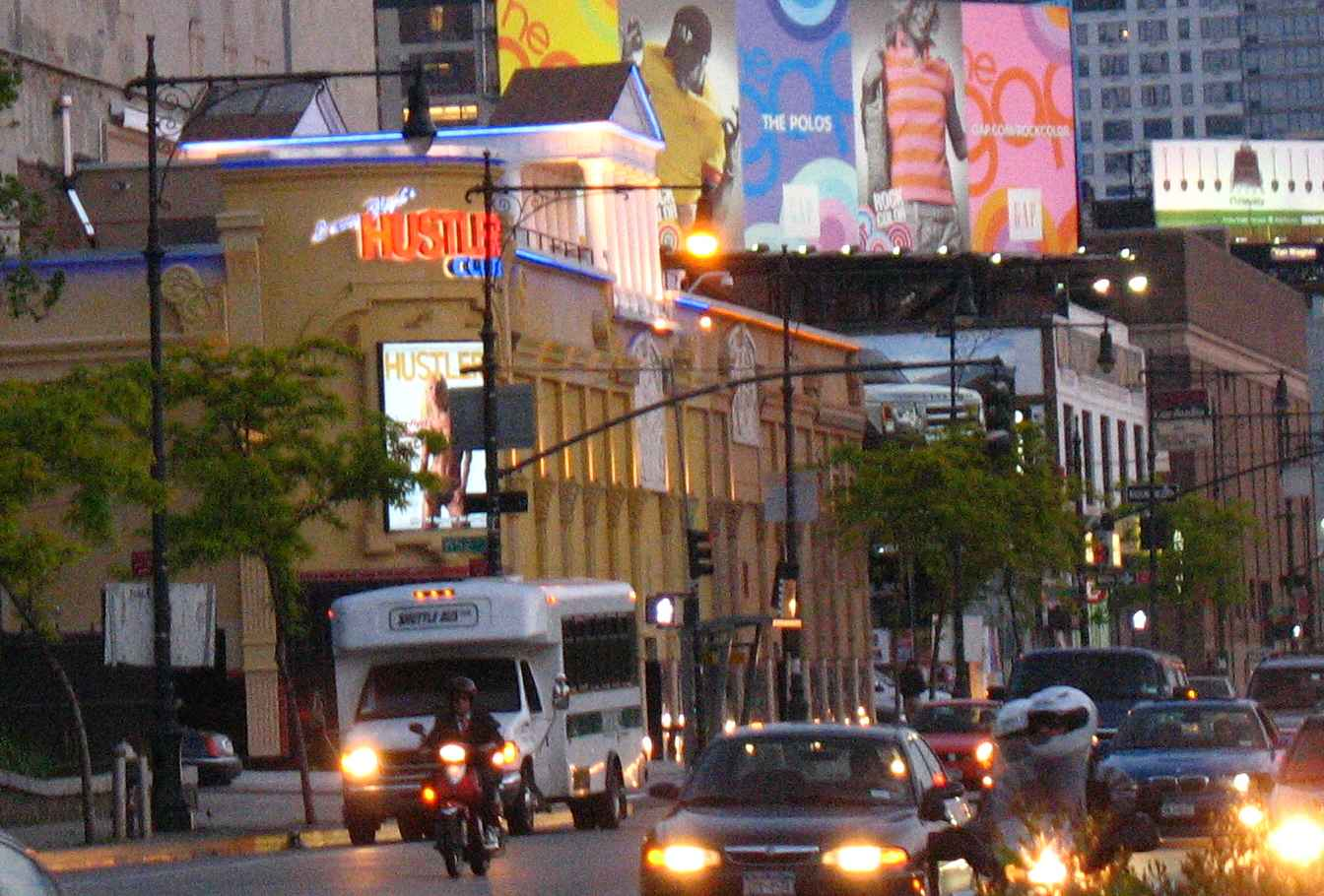
Hustler Club in New York

== Current clubs ==
=== United States ===
- San Francisco, California
- San Diego, California – closed
- Washington Park, Illinois (St. Louis)
- New Orleans, Louisiana
- Baltimore, Maryland – closed
- New York City, New York
- Cleveland, Ohio
- Shreveport, Louisiana
- Las Vegas, Nevada
- Nashville, Tennessee

=== International ===
- Melbourne, Victoria, Australia (Closed)
- Warsaw, Poland

== See also ==
- List of strip clubs
