= Ariana Jollee =

American pornographic actress and director (born 1982)

Ariana Jollee, also known as Adrian Knell
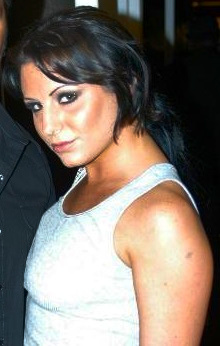
- Jollee at the XRCO Awards show, April 2006
- Born: September 29, 1982 (age 44); New York, New York, U.S.
- Other names: Arrianna, Pat; Mrs. Jollee; Ariane Giselle; Ms. Arianna
- Occupations: Pornographic actress; director
- Height: 5 ft 2 in (1.57 m)

Ariana Jollee or Adrian Knell, (born September 29, 1982) is an American pornographic actress and director. She is of Italian and Russian descent.

== Career ==
Jollee got into the adult film industry in March 2003 at around 20 years old after promoting herself on her homemade website. She was recruited by a production manager from Anabolic Video. Her first adult films were Nasty Girls 30 and Spring Chickens 4.

In 2004, she traveled to Prague to perform in 65 Guy Creampie (Devil's Film 2005) where she had sex with 65 men over six hours and, in the same year, signed a directing contract with Anarchy Films and Python Pictures. Her first movie under the contract was The Narcassist. Jollee also directed the Mayhem series Young Bung. She was only supposed to perform in the movie but replaced Lauren Phoenix as director when Phoenix left the production over creative differences.

== Awards ==
- 2005 AVN Award – Best Group Sex Scene, Video (Orgy World 7)
- 2005 XRCO Award – Superslut of the Year
- 2006 XRCO Award – Superslut of the Year
