= Jessica Jaymes =

American pornographic actress (1979–2019)

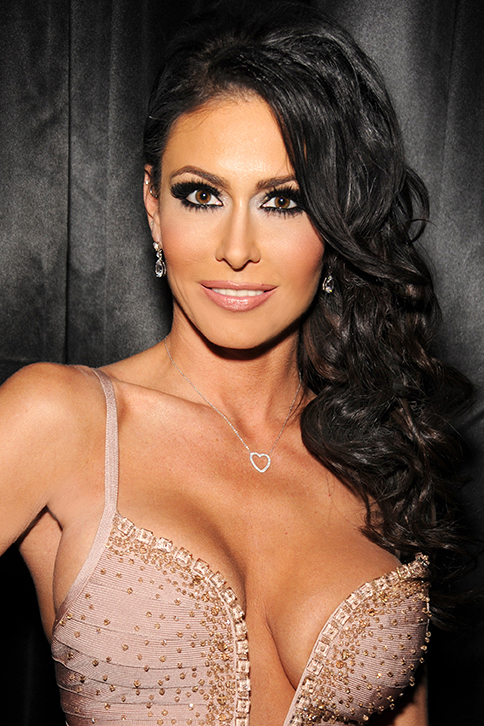
- Jaymes in 2014
- Born: Jessica Redding; March 8, 1979; Anchorage, Alaska, U.S.
- Died: September 17, 2019 (aged 40) (Note: Jaymes' age was inaccurately reported at the time of her death. The Los Angeles County Coroner confirmed that she was 40 years old.); North Hills, California, U.S.
- Other name: Jessica James
- Education: Rio Salado College
- Occupation: Pornographic actress
- Height: 5 ft 7 in (1.70 m)
- Website: jessicajaymesxxx.com

Jessica Redding (March 8, 1979 – September 17, 2019), known by her stage name Jessica Jaymes, was an American pornographic actress. She was Hustler's first contract model and the "Hustler Honey of the Year" in 2004, the August 2008 Penthouse Pet of the Month, and the co-founder of Spizoo, a pornographic film studio.

== Early life ==
Jessica Redding was born in Anchorage, Alaska, on March 8, 1979, to Deborah and Michael Redding (1950–2003). Her mother is of Czech and French descent, and her father worked as an undercover agent for the Drug Enforcement Administration (DEA) and fought in the Vietnam War. She had a younger sister, Bonnie. Redding attended the New Mexico Military Institute in Roswell, New Mexico, before graduating from Rio Salado College in Arizona. She then worked as a fourth- through sixth-grade teacher for three years. Her website states she held an art degree and could play classical piano.

== Career ==
Jaymes' adult film career began in the summer of 2002. Her stage name was a combination of her real first name and the first name of her then-lover, James. In 2004, she became Hustler Video's first contract model and the "Hustler Honey of the Year". She did exclusively all-female work until 2005, when she began appearing alongside male performers. In August 2008, she was the Penthouse Pet of the Month. That same year, she co-founded the pornographic film studio Spizoo.

Jaymes played a small role in two episodes of the television series Weeds in 2006 and 2007, in which she portrayed herself. She also made appearances on various reality shows such as VH1's Celebrity Rehab Sober House, HBO's Vivid Valley, and The Howard Stern Show.

She was credited with more than 300 appearances in both mainstream material and pornography.

== Death ==
Redding was found unconscious at her residence in North Hills, Los Angeles, on September 17, 2019, and pronounced dead at the scene. Her ex-husband and Spizoo business partner found her when he went to check on her after she had been inactive online and unresponsive to messages for nearly a week. Jaymes had a history of seizures, but the cause of her death was not immediately known. An autopsy was performed after which her body was released to her family, but a cause of death was deferred pending toxicology results. The Los Angeles County Coroner's report later listed her causes of death as a seizure and chronic alcohol abuse.

== Awards ==
- 2004 Delta di Venere (from Milan) winner — Best American Starlet
- 2018 AVN Hall of Fame
