= Julia Ann =

American pornographic actress

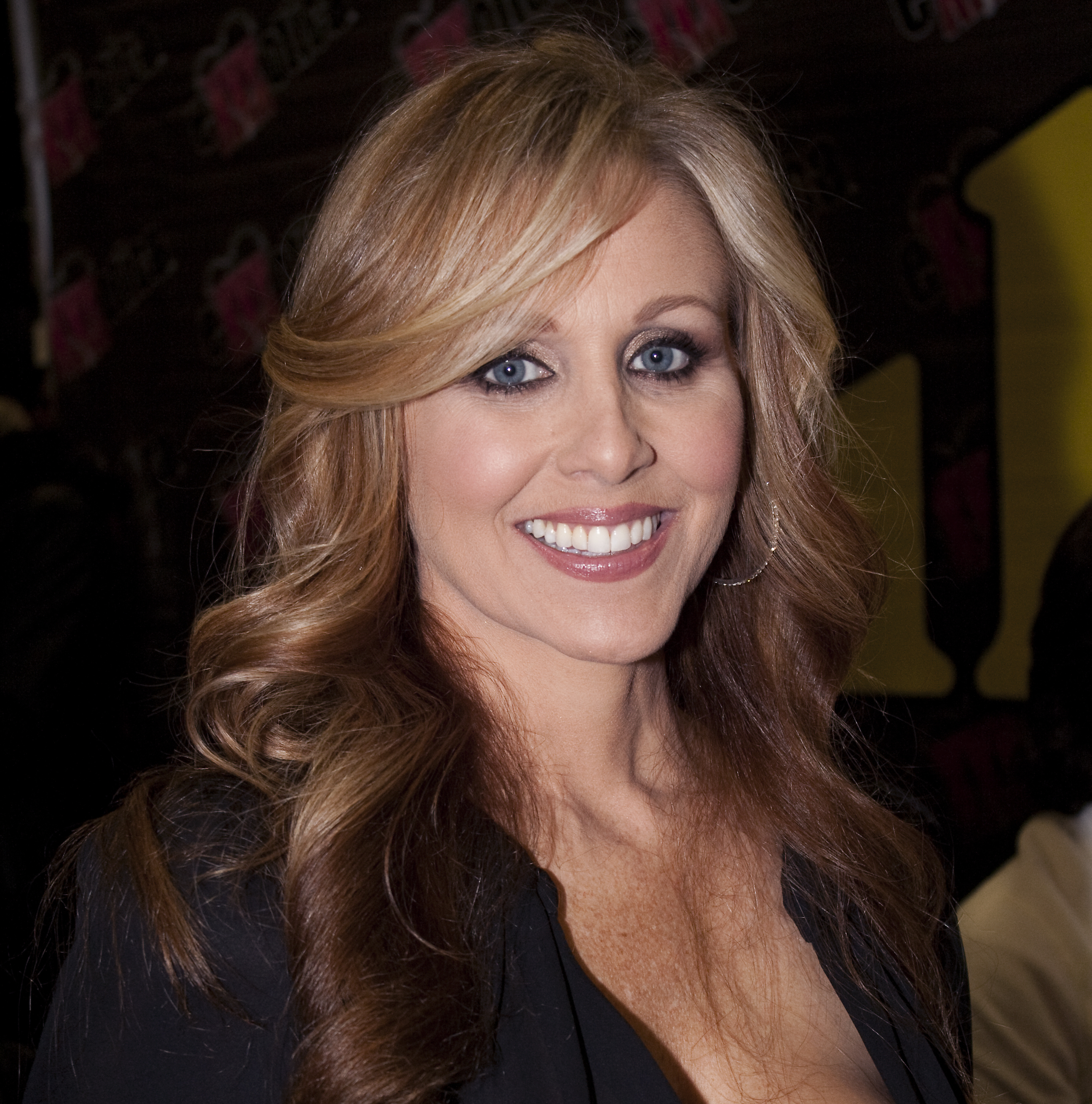
- Ann in 2014
- Born: Los Angeles, California, U.S.
- Occupations: Pornographic actress; feature dancer
- Website: juliaannlive.com

Julia Ann is an American pornographic actress and feature dancer. She is a member of the AVN, XRCO, NightMoves, and Brazzers Halls of Fame.

== Personal life ==
Ann says she grew up around animals and developed a love for horses; she also took piano lessons and learned to swim "like a fish". At age 12 she moved to Idyllwild, California, where she attended a college-prep school before moving back to Los Angeles to live with her grandmother at age 17.

== Career ==
At age 18, Ann hired a photographer to shoot a set of nude photos of her. She worked as a professional mud wrestler in Hollywood, California before becoming one half of the touring strip club feature act Blondage in the early 1990s with Janine Lindemulder. Their success led to their own issue of the Carnal Comics comic book title (which also published a Julia Ann solo comic, co-written by her), as well as offers to join the pornographic film industry.

In the 1990s, Ann performed for Vivid Video alongside Lindemulder. She was under contract to Wicked Pictures in 2006, but in May 2007 she posted on the members section of her website that she had not renewed her contract with Wicked.

== Awards ==
=== AVN awards ===
- 1994 Best All-Girl Sex Scene – Film for Hidden Obsessions
- 2000 Best All-Girl Sex Scene – Film for Seven Deadly Sins
- 2004 Best Actress – Video for Beautiful
- 2004 Hall of Fame
- 2010 Best Makeup for The 8th Day
- 2010 MILF/Cougar Performer of the Year
- 2011 MILF/Cougar Performer of the Year
- 2013 MILF/Cougar Performer of the Year
- 2015 Hottest MILF (Fan Award)
- 2017 Best Marketing Campaign – Individual Project for No on Prop 60
- 2017 Mainstream Star of the Year
- 2021 Most Outrageous Sex Scene for Ministry of Evil
- 2024 Best Non-Sex Performance for Privilege

=== XRCO awards ===
- 1994 Best Girl-Girl Scene for Hidden Obsessions
- 2009 MILF of the Year
- 2011 MILF of the Year
- 2012 Hall of Fame
- 2017 Mainstream Adult Media Favorite

=== NightMoves awards ===
- 2013 Best MILF Performer (Fan's Choice)
- 2015 Hall of Fame

=== XBIZ awards ===
- 2014 MILF Performer of the Year

=== Other awards ===
- 1994 January Hustler Honey
- 2001 Exotic Dancer Hall of Fame
- 2006 Temptation Awards Hall of Fame
- 2012 CNBC's Dirty Dozen
- 2012 Legends of Erotica Hall of Fame
- 2014 Miss FreeOnes Best MILF
- 2022 April VNALive Most Popular Cam Star
- 2023 Brazzers Hall of Fame
