= Rod Fontana =

American pornographic film director & actor (born 1952)

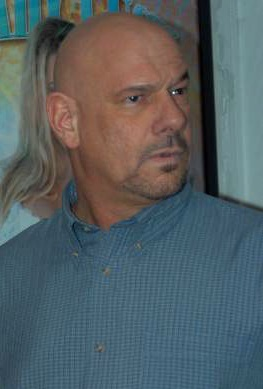
- Born: Ronald Boyer; September 18, 1952 (age 74); Central, South Carolina, U.S.
- Other names: Rod Fontanna, Rod Fontana, Scuddle Fontana
- Height: 6 ft 3 in (1.91 m)
- Spouse: Liza Harper (m. 2002)
- Children: 1

Ronald Boyer (born September 18, 1952), commonly known by the stage name Rod Fontana, is a pornographic actor and director. In 2005, he was inducted into the AVN Hall of Fame. He was reported to have retired from the adult film industry in 2007 to pursue religious interests, but his career continued the next year.

== Early life ==
Boyer was raised as a Southern Baptist in Central, South Carolina, where he was also born. He preached when in his teens before studying history and religion at college.

== Career ==
Boyer left college early to join the U.S. Army and fight in the Vietnam War. On his return in 1975, he had expected to join the NYPD, but the job offer was withdrawn. A friend who was an actor suggested pornography, and Boyer filmed his first scene in the summer of 1976. He left pornography during the 1980s to rejoin the U.S. military, serving as an E-4 specialist. He returned to pornography in the 1990s. Louis Theroux watched a porn shoot including Fontana for his 2005 book "The Call of the Weird: Travels in American Subcultures", calling him an "older guy, jolly, manic, overweight".

The New York Times reported that Fontana retired from pornography in January 2007 and became a registered private investigator and interested in the Episcopal Church. However, he appeared in and directed adult films for Hustler Video from the following year and said to AVN that the newspaper had misrepresented him.

== Personal life ==
Fontana is married to former pornographic actress Liza Harper. Their daughter Diana, born in 2002, nearly died of a staph infection in 2003. This incident eventually led the couple to become more religious.
