= Harry Mohney =

American businessman

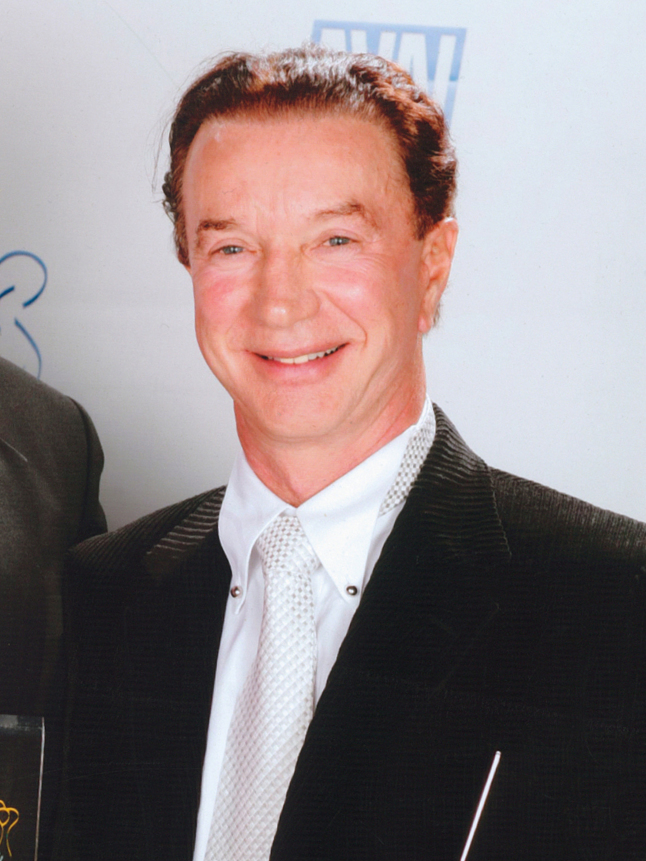
- Déjà Vu owner Harry Mohney with the Reuben Sturman Lifetime Achievement Award at the 2005 AVN Awards
- Born: May 30, 1943 (age 82); Durand, Michigan, U.S.
- Known for: Founder, Déjà Vu Showgirls
- Children: Jason Mohney

Harry Mohney (born May 30, 1943) is the founder of Déjà Vu, a U.S. company which (as of 2006) owns about 132 strip clubs and numerous other adult businesses in 41 U.S. states, as well as multiple clubs abroad. For a period of time, he was the single largest pornographer and distributor of adult material in the world. He began his empire in his hometown of Durand, Michigan (located midway between Flint and Lansing) by buying a failing drive-in theater just outside Durand and switching to showing adults-only movies.

== Déjà Vu ==
Déjà Vu is headquartered in Las Vegas, Nevada; it was founded and is controlled by Harry Mohney, who partnered with Roger Forbes and opened his first Déjà Vu strip club in Seattle in 1987. At the time, his main business was the large-scale distribution of pornography.

The gentleman clubs are called "Déjà Vu Showgirls", "Little Darlings" or "Dream Girls" or (by agreement with Mohney's long-time friends Jimmy Flynt and Larry Flynt who are not involved in the management of the clubs) "Larry Flynt's Hustler Club" and "Hustler Barely Legal". Déjà Vu also owns most of the adult theatres and clubs in San Francisco, but these however carry different names.

== Reuben Sturman Lifetime Achievement Award ==
On January 7, 2005, Jimmy Flynt presented Harry Mohney with the Reuben Sturman Lifetime Achievement Award at the 2005 AVN Awards, which were held at the Venetian Hotel Las Vegas.

== Erotic Heritage Museum ==
The Erotic Heritage Museum (EHM) is a 24,000 sq ft (2,200 m^{2}) area with 17,000 sq ft (1,600 m^{2}) dedicated to displays on the history of erotica, and it is located at 3275 Industrial Road in Paradise, Nevada.
