= Last Breath (2000 film) =

- DVD released by Extreme Associates
- Directed by: Luis Cypher
- Written by: Luis Cypher
- Produced by: Michael Stefano
- Starring: Jessica Darlin
- Cinematography: Slain Wayne
- Edited by: Slain Wayne
- Music by: Joey Amir; L4zie; 13 Music; Slain Wayne
- Production company: Extreme Associates
- Distributed by: Extreme Associates
- Release date: April 2000
- Running time: 120 minutes
- Country: United States
- Language: English

Last Breath is a 2000 American pornographic horror film written and directed by Luis Cypher and produced and distributed by Extreme Associates. The film stars Jessica Darlin as a morally ambiguous, angelic harbinger of death, and co-stars Bridgette Kerkove, Jewel Valmont, Kristi Myst, Allysin Embers, Shelbee Myne, Taylor Moore, Zarina, and Envy.

== Plot ==
As glyphs and death-related images are shown, a voiceover explains that a spirit, born of vengeance and destruction, claims to be the Angel of Mercy. The Spirit appears to the recently deceased and deceives them by offering them "one last breath" before claiming their souls for herself; this prevents the wayward dead from reaching the afterlife and condemns them to an "eternity of suffering" in which the Spirit feeds on them to fill her "emptiness."

A woman named Mary consumes alcohol mixed with pills and is found dead by her husband, who, in despair, commits suicide to be with Mary. The Spirit allows the couple to make love to each other again but then lays claim to both of their souls, which will now be separated for all eternity, with the Spirit musing that the couple, under normal circumstances, could have been together forever in death: "Except I'm not here to keep you together; I'm here to tear you apart."

A woman, in hysterics over being broken up with by her lover, attempts to hang herself from a tree but is stopped by the Spirit. The Spirit whisks the woman away and has a foursome with her and two other women before asking her, "Wouldn't it be great if every day was like this?" The Spirit returns the woman to the noose, and when the woman insists that she now wants to live, the Spirit mocks her and explains that her purpose is to take a person's "last breath" after teasing them with what they could have had right before the woman is hanged and has her soul taken by the Spirit. Elsewhere, a drug addict overdoses, but the Spirit rewinds time, and the addict has sex with his lover instead of getting high, though afterward time resets and the addict's soul is claimed by the Spirit.

Three members of the Black Gate Cult obey the videotaped teachings of their deceased leader and commit ritual suicide by drinking poison together in an attempt to ascend to a higher plane of existence, afterward being approached by the Spirit. The Spirit is gang-banged by the cultists, whom she afterward taunts, revealing that they will not be reunited with their leader and that, "Where you lie is where you die, and I'm here to make sure of it." Next, a gambler who had committed suicide via carbon monoxide poisoning after losing a big sports bet and being left by his wife has his soul reaped by the Spirit.

At the offices of Extreme Associates, a disgruntled warehouse worker named Mark is fired, snaps, and goes on a rampage through the premises with a shotgun, which he uses to murder several people, including his former boss, before attempting suicide, at which point he is approached by the Spirit. The Spirit places Mark in a fantasy in which he is a businessman who is pleasured by two women before the Spirit personally performs oral sex on Mark. After Mark ejaculates, he returns to the exact moment that he had turned his gun on himself and dies, splattering his blood on the Spirit. The Spirit, drenched in Mark's blood, smiles serenely as she walks out of Extreme Associates.

== Cast ==
- Jessica Darlin as The Spirit
- Bridgette Kerkove as Gambler's Wife
- Jewel Valmont as Hanging Suicide
- Kristi Myst as Mary
- Allysin Embers as Drug Addict's Lover
- Shelbee Myne as Hanging Suicide's Lover #1
- Taylor Moore as Hanging Suicide's Lover #2
- Zarina as Mark's Lover #1
- Envy as Mark's Lover #2
- Herschel Savage as Mary's Husband
- Lexington Steele as Gambler
- Michael Stefano as Black Gate Cult Member
- Mark Wood as Mark
- Jack Hammer as Drug Addict
- Chris Handsome as Black Gate Cult Member
- Backey Jakic as Black Gate Cult Member
- Luis Cypher as Mass Shooting Victim in Warehouse
- John Nystrom as Mark's Boss
- Slain Wayne as Black Gate Cult Leader

== Release ==
Last Breath was first announced by Rob Black, the owner of Extreme Associates, in a February 2000 interview with Gene Ross of AVN. In the interview, Black said that the film would be released direct-to-video in April 2000 before boasting, "It will be one of the biggest from Extreme this year. It's very disturbing. I'll get a ton of heat and aggravation for it, but I'll put it out the way it is."

== Reception ==
Jeremy Stone, in a review written for Adam Film World Guide, gave Last Breath a perfect score of 5/5 ("Volcanic") and called it a "twisted tantalizer" and "sex-crazed dementia at its most demented" before writing, "The flick is filled with disturbing, nightmarish imagery, as well as lots of over-the-top eroticism that will please those who can get past the out-there subject matter." AVN gave Last Breath a grade of 4/5, found the film to be "solid overall" in terms of sex scenes, and concluded, "The whole effect falls on the side of shock-value-for-shock-value's-sake, rather than the dark and interesting portrait of despair it ought to have been; but at least it's a return to the style that Extreme Associates fans have been deprived of lately." Peter van Aarle of Cyberspace Adult Video Reviews gave Last Breath a score of 8.98 on a scale of 6.00/10.00, praised Jessica Darlin's performance, and criticized the film's plot before concluding, "Lame storyline, hot action!" In a review written for Rec.Arts.Movies.Erotica, the film was commended, with the reviewer noting, "A full 2 hours of death and sex combined. It will probably kill a lot of wood but all you have to do is drag that sick fuck part of your personality out and you'll get rock hard!"

The film was nominated for Best Anal Sex Scene (Video) and Best Vignette Tape at the 18th AVN Awards but lost the former to In the Days of Whore and the latter to Terrors from the Clit 2, two other films that were also produced and distributed by Extreme Associates.
