= Ass Clowns =

- DVD released by Extreme Associates
- Directed by: Thomas Zupko
- Written by: Thomas Zupko
- Produced by: Thomas Zupko
- Starring: Taylor St. Clair; Kendra Jade Rossi; Kat Langer; Sharon Kane; Amber Woods
- Edited by: Sean Finn; Paul Norman; Slain Wayne
- Music by: Juz Maintain; Toby the Viking
- Production company: Extreme Associates
- Distributed by: Extreme Associates
- Release date: November 15, 2000 (United States)
- Running time: 137 minutes
- Country: United States
- Language: English

Ass Clowns is a 2000 American pornographic anthology film written and directed by Thomas Zupko and produced and distributed by Extreme Associates. The film consists of "a series of vignettes based around parental, societal, and religious abuse" and stars Taylor St. Clair, Kendra Jade Rossi, Kat Langer, Amber Woods, Michael Stefano, and Brian Surewood. Ass Clowns was followed by three sequels, the second of which, 2002's Ass Clowns 3, was one of the films for which the United States government prosecuted Extreme Associates for obscenity in the 2005 trial United States v. Extreme Associates, Inc.

== Plot ==
A wealthy man named Claudio and his wife bully their intellectually impaired daughter, who afterward begins masturbating to thoughts of her favorite soap opera star, Luciano. The masturbation fantasy turns grim when Luciano rips his head open and drenches the girl in brain matter before raping her, all the while mocking her for having "no fucking brains." As Luciano sexually abuses the girl while forcing her to spell words out loud, the girl starts to enjoy it and receives a facial from Luciano after he has her spell out the word "cum."

A girl named Cat is gangraped by her drunken father and three of his friends and, during the assault, begins dissociating by imagining herself as a silver-skinned humanoid having consensual sex with her attackers, all of whom Cat visualizes as life-sized toys consisting of an alien, the Easter Bunny, a zombie, and the Tooth Fairy. When the fantasy ends, Cat is shown still being gangraped while she sobs, "Help me! Please help me!" Elsewhere, a young couple in a car are approached by a pair of police officers, who plant marijuana on the youngsters, with one of the officers imbibing in the drug himself before he and his partner take the couple into the woods and force the boyfriend to watch as they rape his girlfriend (who, partway into the sexual assault, begins to enjoy it). After the officers leave, the girlfriend's father finds the couple and chastises his daughter for taking his car without his permission before forcing her to perform fellatio on him as he sarcastically states, "You know what's going to happen to you, you stupid bitch? The cops are going to come and take you."

While getting ready for the prom, a narcissistic, virginal teenage girl named Taylor orders a pizza and is attacked by the pizza delivery man, an undead brute whose pizza is covered in body parts, which he tries to force-feed to Taylor. The pizzaman begins raping Taylor, with Taylor's prom date at one point calling and listening over the telephone as the pizzaman is sexually assaulting Taylor. Taylor's parents, who are dressed as clowns, join the pizza delivery man in raping Taylor.

In a cemetery, a woman who is covered in worms has rough sex with a trio of demons while a priest, who is also covered in worms, masturbates nearby while reading aloud from the Bible. After the demons and the priest ejaculate and urinate on the woman, she begins tearing pages out of the Bible and shoving them up her anus while screaming blasphemy at a figurine of Jesus. In a post-credits scene, Kendra Jade Rossi and a member of the film's crew are both shown disparaging Thomas Zupko, the director of Ass Clowns.

== Cast ==
- Taylor St. Clair as Claudio's Daughter/Taylor
- Kendra Jade Rossi as Woman in Cemetery
- Kat Langer as Cat
- Amber Woods as Girl in Car
- Michael Stefano as Luciano/Police Officer
- Brian Surewood as Cat's Father's Friend #1/Alien/Zombie Pizza Delivery Man
- Valentino as Cat's Father's Friend #2/Tooth Fairy/Police Officer/Demon #1
- Brandon Iron as Demon #2
- Rod Fontana as Cat's Father's Friend #3/Zombie
- Mark Wood as Boy in Car/Demon #3
- Claudio Bergamin as Claudio/Cat's Father/Easter Bunny/Girl in Car's Father/Taylor's Father
- Anthony Crane as Priest
- Kristi Myst as Female Clown Host
- Jake Lawless as Male Clown Host
- Sharon Kane as Claudio's Wife/Taylor's Mother

== Production ==
Ass Clowns was shot on DV and was described by director Thomas Zupko as being more "down and dirty" and not as "story driven" as his previous film, In the Days of Whore, which was also produced and distributed by Extreme Associates. According to Zupko, he hoped to use Ass Clowns to "expose all of the frauds, kooks, and hypocrites on this god-forsaken planet, including priests, cops, politicians, the bourgeois, and most important of all, 99% of the directors and producers in pornography."

== Release ==
Ass Clowns was released direct-to-video by Extreme Associates on November 15, 2000, in both a standard edition and a director's cut, with the latter containing additional footage of sex acts like Kendra Jade Rossi being given a golden shower and Taylor St. Clair being fisted by Michael Stefano. The film was rereleased on DVD, with footage having been cut out, in May 2002. It was out of print by May 2006.

== Reception ==
AVN noted that Ass Clowns had a "very, very sharp edge" and opined that all of the film's sex scenes were "sick and twisted" and were intended to "provoke" as well as "titillate" before giving it a score of 3½/5. Peter van Aarle of Cyberspace Adult Video Reviews found most of the sex scenes in Ass Clowns to be "pretty hot" but criticized the roughness of others and described Kendra Jade Rossi's scene as being "too disgusting to review" before giving the film a score of 7.60 on a scale of 6.00/10.00. In a subsequent review of the film's DVD rerelease, van Aarle gave Ass Clowns a new, more lenient grade of 8.20/10.00 and wrote, "Thomas Zupko shows in this movie that he has the potential for greatness." Ass Clowns was described as being "the most fucked up porn movie I have ever seen" by a review posted on Rec.Arts.Movies.Erotica, where it was further deemed "shock porn" but nonetheless praised for its camerawork, editing, sex scenes, and performances by Taylor St. Clair. Peter Ramezap, in a review of the film's Director's Cut posted to Rec.Arts.Movies.Erotica, also praised Taylor St. Clair's performances and wrote, "Besides the incest theme, I thought this was a very well done piece of hardcore porn."

Roger T. Pipe of RogReviews was critical of the film's editing but commended the "hard, shocking and mostly well shot" sex scenes before concluding, "It's not my idea of a great jerk off movie, but it's wild, it's hard-core and pure Zupko." ViceList had a middling response to Ass Clowns, finding it "weird" and writing, "The simulated sexual assaults (either reality based or buried in twisted dream sequences) are very demented and certainly not for the faint of heart. At first, the scenes start out rather ironic and humorous. However, as the movie putters on, things get more seriously disturbing." A score of 5/5 was awarded to Ass Clowns by Neil B. of XXX Movie Review, who praised every aspect of it and wrote, "While this film may be disturbing to some, it is quite well done and not only delivers high-energy sex, but it gives you something to think about. Zupko's unique view of sex isn't for everyone, but he's one of the few directors out there that's willing to put this type of erotic fare on film."

Ass Clowns placed second in the High Society list Top Ten Videos of the Year (2000).
