= Terrors from the Clit 2 =

- Directed by: Slain Wayne
- Written by: Slain Wayne
- Based on: Tales from the Crypt by William Gaines and Steven Dodd
- Produced by: Slain Wayne
- Starring: Gauge; Brandi Lyons; Felony; Kristi Myst; Kiki D'Aire; Candy Cotton
- Edited by: Slain Wayne
- Music by: XXX Groovemaster; L4zie; 13 Music
- Production company: Extreme Associates
- Distributed by: Extreme Associates
- Release date: 2000
- Running time: 135 minutes
- Country: United States
- Language: English

Terrors from the Clit 2 is a 2000 American pornographic comedy horror film written and directed by Slain Wayne and produced and distributed by Extreme Associates. An anthology film, it is part of a series, being a sequel to the 1998 film Terrors from the Clit. It stars Gauge, Brandi Lyons, Felony, Kristi Myst, Kiki D'Aire, and Candy Cotton.

== Plot ==
The film's five segments are hosted by the pun-spewing Clit Master, who is dressed as Count Dracula.

- "The Evil Love Doll": A virgin purchases and becomes obsessed with an inflatable sex doll, which is discovered by his roommate, Mike. Mike convinces his roommate to have a threesome with him and his girlfriend; the enraged sex doll springs to life and murders Mike and his girlfriend before it confronts its owner, who it corners while chanting, "I love you."
- "Love Potion No. 69": A strip club employee named Joey longs for his boss's stripper wife, who he drugs with a love potion bought from a man named Shazbah. Joey accidentally spikes his crush's drink with the entire bottle of serum, instead of just the recommended single drop, before he has a threesome with her and Shazbah. The woman, who has begun acting obsessively towards Joey, kills her husband when he confronts and attacks Joey. Joey, in a panic, bludgeons and runs his crush over, but she comes back to life as a zombie and pursues Joey as he pleads, "Please, leave me alone!"
- "The Satanic Mechanics": A pair of female criminals steal $500,000 and shoot a police officer while fleeing to Mexico. The women's car breaks down, and they are forced to call a tow truck driver, who turns out to be the leader of a group of Satanists. The cultists cut out and eat one woman's heart as part of a Satanic ritual and are gunned down by the other woman, only to resurrect as demons due to having been "immortalized" by Satan. The cultists gangbang the remaining woman, who then escapes, unaware that she is now pregnant with "the demon's child."
- "Sadie the Succubus Slayer": Sadie, a vampire hunter, and her sidekick slay a vampire in an abandoned house and are afterward ambushed by two more vampires, who seduce Sadie's partner into helping them overpower Sadie. Sadie and her partner have sex with the vampires, who then vampirically sire Sadie.
- "The Cannible [sic] Jungle Porno": A small pornographic film crew ventures into a South American jungle, guided by a local named Stanley. The group disturbs members of a reclusive cannibal tribe, who butcher the crew's production assistant and male star after they are abandoned by Stanley. The crew's director, Jimmy, covertly records his film's female star being raped by the cannibals, who afterward behead the woman; the cannibals then catch and murder Jimmy, whose film reels are eventually found by the police and sold to Extreme Associates.

== Cast ==
- Gauge as Mike's Girlfriend
- Brandi Lyons as Strip Club Owner's Wife
- Felony as Fugitive #1
- Kristi Myst as Sadie
- Kiki D'Aire as Sadie's Sidekick
- Candy Cotton as Porno Actress
- Tonya White as Fugitive #2
- Kali Styles as Stripper
- Michael Stefano as Joey
- Nick East as Mike
- Mojo as Mike's Roommate
- Scott Lyons as Shazbah
- Brian Surewood as Strip Club Patron/Satanic Mechanics' Leader
- Brick Majors as Vampire #1
- Mark Anthony as Cannibal #1
- Mark Wood as Satanic Mechanic/Vampire #2
- Tony Michaels as Satanic Mechanic/Tony
- Brandon Iron as Satanic Mechanic
- Dukey Flyswatter as Dukey, the Clit Master
- Jimmy Bones as Production Assistant
- David Aaron Clark as Strip Club Owner
- Alexander DeVoe as Cannibal #2
- Arnold Schwartzenpecker as Satanic Mechanic
- Adrian Smith as The Clit Master's Sidekick
- Julian St. Jox as Stanley/Cannibal #3
- Slain Wayne as Jimmy

== Production ==
Terrors from the Clit 2 was first announced by Rob Black, the owner of Extreme Associates, in a May 1999 article by AVN, where Black mentioned that the film would be directed by Eric Brummer and star Kristi Myst. In August 2000, Slain Wayne announced that the film would star Candy Cotton and Keli Sparks, contain "a healthy dose" of cannibalism and necrophilia, and, as a publicity stunt, claimed that Extreme Associates had acquired "actual footage of a violent murder in a South American jungle" and developed it for use in Terrors from the Clit 2, stating, "Apparently a group of local filmmakers went out in the jungle to shoot some pornos, which totally enraged the local natives."

== Reception ==
AVN praised the film, giving it a score of 4/5 and writing, "Drugged-out, homicidal strippers? David Aaron Clark getting decapitated? Now that's porn! Slain Wayne presents five gore-filled vignettes here, steeped in twelve aortas' worth of blood and a Creepshow-meets-White Zombie sense of humor." Peter van Aarle of Cyberspace Adult Video Reviews criticized the film's first and third sex scenes, gave it an overall grade of 7.80 on a scale of 6.00/10.00, and concluded, "The sex part is real hot, the rest is not!" Richard Dunstan of Indiefilm noted that Terrors from the Clit 2 was an example of "extreme pornography" that attempted to "push the limits of both legality and taste" by introducing "horror elements into porn, complete with gory (though silly) special effects." ViceList opined that the film had commendable attempts at plots and storylines but was otherwise dismissive of it, writing, "A sober mind will be so frustrated by the atrociousness of the acting that there's no way the balls will have any say in the matter."

Terrors from the Clit 2 won Best Vignette Tape at the 18th AVN Awards, where it was also nominated for Most Outrageous Sex Scene.
