= Bound by Blood =

- DVD released by Extreme Associates
- Directed by: Michael Stefano
- Written by: Jewel De'Nyle; Michael Stefano
- Produced by: Michael Stefano
- Starring: Jewel De'Nyle; Jessica Darlin; Samantha Stylles; Kristi Myst; Nikita Denise
- Narrated by: Michael Stefano
- Edited by: Claudio Bergamin; Gina Rome
- Production company: Extreme Associates
- Distributed by: Extreme Associates
- Release date: January 2001
- Running time: 112 minutes
- Country: United States
- Languages: English; Italian

Bound by Blood is a 2001 American pornographic film written and directed by Michael "Luciano" Stefano and produced and distributed by Extreme Associates. A gangster film, it was co-written by an uncredited Jewel De'Nyle, who stars in it alongside Jessica Darlin, Samantha Stylles, Kristi Myst, and Nikita Denise.

== Plot ==
Lucky Luciano, a member of the Vincenzo crime family, beats and stabs a "rat" named Jimmy with the help of his partner, Alfi, and then has a threesome with Jimmy's oblivious wife and Alfi. Jimmy's wife is then garroted by Alfi after she hears her dying husband convulsing in the car trunk that he had been stuffed into by Alfi and Lucky.

Nick, another member of the Vincenzo family, has embezzled money from Don Vincenzo and defected to a rival crime family that is led by Tony. Lucky has his wife, Mary, seduce and stab Nick. Later, Don Vincenzo has a threesome with two prostitutes as he orders Lucky to look for his flighty wife, Donna. Donna turns out to be having an affair with Tony, who professes his love for Donna.

Tony responds to the Vincenzo family's murder of Nick by having two of his soldiers rape, strangle, and drown Mary. The Vincenzo family in turn retaliates by ambushing Tony while he is with Donna. Don Vincenzo has Tony beaten bloody and then forces him to watch at gunpoint as he has Alfi, Lucky, and a third Vincenzo crewman named Joey gangrape Donna (who, partway into the sexual assault, begins to enjoy it). After his henchmen ejaculate onto Donna's face, Don Vincenzo has Donna and Tony shot by Joey and Lucky. A mournful Lucky then returns home and drops a single red rose on top of the dead Mary.

== Cast ==
- Claudio Bergamin as Don Vincenzo
- Michael Stefano as Lucky Luciano
- Jessica Darlin as Donna Vincenzo
- Jewel De'Nyle as Mary
- Mark Wood as Alfi
- Micky Ray as Joey
- Jason McCain as Tony
- Troy Michaels as Nick
- Samantha Stylles as Jimmy's Wife
- Homeless Jimmy as Jimmy
- Kristi Myst as Slut #1
- Nikita Denise as Slut #2
- Mickey G. as Soldier #1
- Gino Greco as Soldier #2
- Ariel as Woman at Party
- Nick as Gangster #1
- Mitch Stylle as Gangster #2

== Production ==
The film had the working title of Luciano's Bound by Blood: Life of a Gangster and was co-produced and co-written (uncredited) by actress Jewel De'Nyle. According to De'Nyle, the scene where her face appears all bloody was unsimulated, as she had actually injured her nose during her character's rape scene with Gino Greco and Mickey G. De'Nyle decided to integrate the injury into the film, since it "fit the scene." In a 2002 interview with Roger T. Pipe, director Michael Stefano opined that Bound by Blood was "cool" but also "not worth it" and vowed not to produce any further adult feature films, later commenting, in a 2003 follow-up interview with Pipe, in regard to Bound by Blood, "If you look at that movie, there is like thirteen minutes of dialog, so it's all sex anyway. All that effort and time for a few minutes of dialog? People forgot about that movie in a few months so it wasn't worth it. I'd rather just keep it simple and give the best sex possible."

== Reception ==
AVN was critical of the film's choreography and special effects but otherwise praised it, giving it a score of 4/5 while opining that its sex scenes were "powerful" and that Michael Stefano showed "new range as a director, demonstrating he's not just about ultra hard wall-to-wall fare such as Anal Asspirations." Peter van Aarle of Cyberspace Adult Video Reviews called the film "another blood and guts movie from Extreme" and, focusing only on the sex scenes, gave Bound by Blood a score of 7.97 on a scale of 6.00/10.00. Neil B. of XXX Movie Review gave Bound by Blood a grade of 3/5 and, while praising the film's sex scenes, lambasted nearly every other aspect of it, concluding, "As far as the story goes, it's not bad. However the production was amateurish and the directing was lacking. On top of that, the music was weak, the special effects were cheap and the acting, with a few exceptions, left much to be desired." ViceList was similarly critical of the film, offering praise to all of the sex scenes besides the last two, but opining that the attempt at combining a gangster film with hardcore pornography was awkward, stating, "The two simply don't jive, and they do each other a disservice."

Bound by Blood received adult film award pre-nominations, including from AVN, but, according to Stefano, did not win or get nominated for any awards due to the enactment of an industry-wide ban on all content that was produced by Extreme Associates.
