= Abyss (2000 film) =

- DVD released by Extreme Associates
- Directed by: Thomas Zupko
- Written by: Thomas Zupko
- Based on: The House of the Dead by Fyodor Dostoevsky
- Produced by: Thomas Zupko
- Starring: Kristi Myst; Stevie; Krista Leigh; Gauge; Wanda Curtis
- Edited by: Slain Wayne
- Music by: Toby the Viking
- Production company: Extreme Associates
- Distributed by: Extreme Associates
- Release date: December 2000 (United States)
- Running time: 124 minutes
- Country: United States
- Languages: English; Russian

Abyss is a 2000 American pornographic film written and directed by Thomas Zupko and produced and distributed by Extreme Associates. A period piece, the film concerns high-ranking members of the Russian military who are sentenced to death for sex crimes, with the plot being based on the 19th-century Russian novel The House of the Dead by Fyodor Dostoevsky. It stars Kristi Myst, Stevie, Krista Leigh, Gauge, and Wanda Curtis.

== Plot ==
In 19th-century Russia, five military officers are vying to be appointed governor of a province north of Saint Petersburg. One of the men, Niklai Valkov, invites the other four to his estate, where their every whim is to be catered to by Valkov's servant, Smernov. The men enjoy the finery of the estate, as well as prostitutes who are brought to them by Smernov. Smernov, under orders from Valkov, kills the women whenever the officers are done with them, with his guilt over the murders being so immense that he dissociates from them by blaming them on a sadistic, imaginary "evil twin" named Horowitz.

Valkov arrests his fellow officers for the prostitute murders, which they have been framed for by Smernov. The officers are sentenced to death and imprisoned in Siberia, while Valkov is appointed governor and made a general by the Tsar. During their five years in prison, the officers are regularly visited and tortured by Valkov, who at one point grants them access to a woman who he has sex with alongside them and Smernov.

The night before their execution, the four officers, maddened by the harsh conditions of their imprisonment, collectively hallucinate the Virgin Mary. The officers gang bang Mary as she verbally abuses them and repeatedly shrieks, "There is no fucking God!" In the morning, the officers are personally executed by Valkov, who shoots each of the men in the head, with the vision of the Virgin Mary reappearing afterward to taunt the officers, performing oral sex on their bodies while sarcastically asking, "How does it feel to be dead?"

== Cast ==
- Kristi Myst as Virgin Mary
- Stevie as Prison Woman
- Krista Leigh as Second Prostitute
- Gauge as First Prostitute
- Wanda Curtis as Third Prostitute
- Brian Surewood as Military Officer
- Brandon Iron as Horowitz
- Mickey G. as Military Officer
- Valentino as Military Officer
- Mojo as Military Officer
- Mr. Pete as Smernov
- Anthony Crane as General Niklai Valkov

== Production ==
Abyss was based on The House of the Dead, a 19th-century Russian novel by Fyodor Dostoevsky. According to director Thomas Zupko, the film was "probably in some respects better" but also "completely different" than In the Days of Whore, another one of Zupko's films that was also produced and distributed by Extreme Associates. Zupko further described Abyss as "existential smut for all of us who have been fucked over by society our entire lives" and an example of "pushing the limit to see what I can get away with" and cited actress Krista Leigh's sex scene as an instance of the latter, with Zupko noting that Leigh had experienced a tearful, hysterical breakdown while shooting the scene because "it was probably the best sexual experience she's ever had."

== Release ==
Abyss was released direct-to-video by Extreme Associates in December 2000. It was rereleased on DVD in May 2002.

In 2005, a copy of the film was investigated by the Canada Border Services Agency for being potentially obscene, but it was ultimately judged to be "admissible" by the organization's Prohibited Importations Unit.

== Reception ==
AVN gave Abyss a score of 3½ out of 5, commended the film's sex scenes, and criticized every other aspect of it, with the reviewer lambasting Abyss as an annoying, drawn-out, muddled, and pretentious production that felt like a "pseudo-intellectual student film" before concluding, "Yes, Zupko has ambition and vision. But someone clearly needs to rein in his pretensions." Peter van Aarle of Cyberspace Adult Video Reviews awarded Abyss a grade of 8.42 on a scale of 6.00/10.00, criticized the "silly dialogue" and the roughness (specifically the slapping) of the second sex scene, and ultimately concluded, "Too bad about the slapping scene. If they would have left the slapping out, this would have been a monthly top ten!" In a subsequent review of the film's DVD rerelease, van Aarle gave Abyss a new, more lenient grade of 8.70/10.00 and wrote, "Thomas Zupko shows in this movie that he has the potential for greatness."

Roger T. Pipe of RogReviews gave Abyss a score of 9/10 and wrote, "While I don't think The Abyss is as deep or even as shocking as Days of Whore, I think it's a better piece of jerk off material. While I didn't dig the slapping in the Krista scene or the religious mix in the final fuck, the rest of the sex is pure, (good) filth." In a later review of the film's DVD rerelease, Pipe further commented, "Even two years later, I still say this stands as Zupko's most solid feature to date. The story is good, twisted of course, but deep. Some of the subtitles get a little long, but it's well worth watching from start to finish." Abyss was given a score of 3/5 by Neil B. of XXXMovieReviews, who praised the film's camerawork, editing, music, and sex scenes while criticizing the audio, pace, plot, and the use of subtitles, writing, "With Zupko, you usually either love it or hate it but with this one I loved the sex scenes but was quite disappointed with the rest."
