= Purity and Innocence =

- DVD released by Extreme Associates
- Directed by: Lizzy Borden
- Written by: Lizzy Borden
- Produced by: Robert Black
- Starring: Ashlyn Gere; Michael Stefano; Kristi Myst; Jessica Jewel; Angelica Sin
- Edited by: Slain Wayne
- Music by: L4zie; 13 Music
- Production company: Extreme Associates
- Distributed by: Extreme Associates
- Release date: 2000
- Running time: 105 minutes
- Country: United States
- Language: English

Purity and Innocence is a 2000 American pornographic film written and directed by Lizzy Borden and produced and distributed by Extreme Associates. A dark psychological drama, it stars Ashlyn Gere and Michael Stefano as a couple grieving the death of their infant son and co-stars Kristi Myst, Jessica Jewel, and Angelica Sin.

== Plot ==
Kelly returns home to find her husband, Nick, inconsolable, Nick having just been informed by the police that a hit and run driver killed both his and Kelly's nanny and their infant son, Brandon. Two months later, Kelly has become a depressed alcoholic and grown distant from Nick. Nick advises Kelly that they need to move on from Brandon's death, but the distraught Kelly instead grudgingly performs fellatio on Nick.

While Kelly bathes, drinks, and pops pills, Nick also gets drunk and mourns Brandon. The couple passes out, and Nick dreams about engaging in a rough threesome with Brandon's teacher and a special needs student named Joey. Kelly dreams about a demonic entity terrorizing her and Brandon, who is in a bloody bassinet, before she watches herself have sex with Nick.

In Nick's next dream, the demon brings him to Brandon's grave, where Brandon's teacher and another woman degrade, waterboard, and bind and gag Nick. While tormenting Nick, the women have sex with a man on top of Brandon's grave and are afterward attacked by Nick. Nick places the women in a trash bag and urinates on Brandon's grave before being transported to a birthday party for Brandon. There, Nick has an orgy with everyone from the graveyard, as well as a third woman, ending with him and the other man ejaculating onto a wreath (which has a bloody teddy bear on it) dedicated to Brandon.

A flashback reveals Kelly was cheating on Nick and that, while driving home drunk from a rendezvous with her paramour, she was the one who accidentally ran over the nanny and Brandon. Nick awakens to discover Kelly has slit her wrists with a razor blade, which prompts Nick to shoot himself in the head while cradling Kelly's body and a toy that belonged to Brandon.

== Cast ==
- Ashlyn Gere as Kelly
- Michael Stefano as Nick
- Kristi Myst as Teacher/Graveside Lover #1/Birthday Party Guest #1
- Jessica Jewel as Graveside Lover #2/Birthday Party Guest #2
- Angelica Sin as Birthday Party Guest #3
- Brandon Iron as Kelly's Lover
- Backey Jakic as Graveside Lover #3/Birthday Party Guest #4
- Chris Handsome as Joey
- Lizzy Borden as Brandon's Nanny
- Jake Lawless as Demon

== Production ==
According to director Lizzy Borden, the film suffered production problems due to issues with actress Ashlyn Gere, with Borden having stated, "We paid her for the whole thing, but she never finished it. That movie is not the way it was supposed to be. Ashlyn totally fucked us so we had to revamp the script." Like many of her films, Borden considers Purity and Innocence to be a morality play, an interview with Salon.com having summed the film's plot up with, "A bad alcoholic mother runs over her babysitter and her son, and ends up slashing her wrists (after having sex with assorted strangers first)."

== Reception ==
AVN called Purity and Innocence a "road show from hell" and a "very weird puzzle" that was comparable to an Italian opera before giving it a score of 4/5. Peter van Aarle of Cyberspace Adult Video Reviews lambasted the film, giving it a grade of 6.00/10.00 (the lowest one possible) and concluding, "Not my cup of tea! Too much weirdness!" Roger T. Pipe gave Purity and Innocence a score of 8/10 and wrote, "Sexually, this movie is fantastic, if a bit disturbing. Not for everyone, and not always for me, Purity and Innocence is original, hot, dark and dirty." ViceList opined that the film's acting was "surprisingly good" but otherwise expressed disdain for it, stating, "Lizzy isn't trying to make something artistic or sexy. She's going strictly for shock value."
