= Club Satan: The Witches Sabbath =

- DVD released by Extreme Associates
- Directed by: Shane Bugbee
- Written by: Amy Bugbee; Shane Bugbee
- Produced by: Mark Zane; Matt Zane
- Starring: Paris Gables
- Edited by: Hart D. Fisher
- Production company: Extreme Associates
- Distributed by: Extreme Associates
- Release date: March 21, 2007 (United States)
- Running time: 75 minutes
- Country: United States
- Language: English

Club Satan: The Witches Sabbath (also known as The Devil in Miss Gables) is a 2007 American pornographic horror film written and directed by Shane Bugbee, co-written by Amy Bugbee, and produced and distributed by Extreme Associates. The film was endorsed by the Church of Satan, contains an actual Black Mass, and was touted by its creators as being "the first Satanic porno film." It stars Paris Gables as Lilly, a churchgoing Catholic ingénue whose increasingly sexual thoughts lead to her embracing Satanism. An unproduced sequel, titled Club Satan: Bleed, Angels, Bleed, was announced by Shane Bugbee in March 2007.

== Plot ==
Lilly, a virginal Catholic schoolgirl, visits a playground and then a church for Confession. It has been sixty-nine days since Lilly's last Confession, and she admits to being troubled by thoughts of rough sex with men and women, as well as incest with her parents and younger brother, and fears that these fantasies will condemn her to Hell. During Confession, Lilly suffers a breakdown, during which she alternates between tearfully chastising and harming herself and spewing blasphemy while masturbating with a Jesus figurine and a Bible. The priest sends Lilly to see a pair of nuns, who denigrate Lilly while abusing her physically and sexually, including with a crucifix and Prayer beads. Lilly, as she is being assaulted, fantasizes about having sex with the nuns, and about the nuns using the Jesus figurine to splash her with their urine in a mockery of Baptism.

Lilly is deemed hopeless and kicked out of the church by the nuns and begins sobbing in an alleyway when she is approached by a man named Simon Iff. Iff comforts Lilly, reassures her that her desires are natural, and encourages her to give in to them, which Lilly does by performing oral sex on Iff. After Iff ejaculates on Lilly's face, he reveals that he somehow knows Lilly's name before inviting her to a gathering, reassuring Lilly, "You'll have a great time, I promise. And I also promise that you'll never feel bad again."

Hours later, Lilly visits the address given to her by Iff, a warehouse inhabited by a cult that worships Satan, who manifests before Lilly. Lilly gives the "kiss of shame" (anilingus) to Satan, who then calls forth his five Secret Chiefs, including Iff. A pair of high priests and the Secret Chiefs induct Lilly into their cult by performing a Black Mass before the Secret Chiefs engage in a rough gang bang with Lilly. During the gang bang, Lilly drinks and drenches herself in "unholy blood" from a kapala and urinates on a ceramic bust of Jesus. The gang bang ends with four of the Secret Chiefs ejaculating onto Lilly's face while the fifth ejaculates onto the bust of Jesus, which is then smashed by Lilly after she proclaims herself to be "Satan's fucking whore."

The credits roll over footage of Lilly, now in gothic attire, at a concert held by the Devil's Disciples.

== Cast ==
- Paris Gables as Lilly
- Matt Zane as High Priest #1
- Shane Bugbee as High Priest #2
- Dark Funeral as The Devil's Disciples
- Kyle Stone as Simon Iff/Secret Chief #5
- Frank Towers as Satan
- Dakota as Nun #1
- Cassandra Cruz as Nun #2
- Dominic Ross as Secret Chief #1
- Rick Masters as Secret Chief #2
- John West as Secret Chief #3
- Scott Lyons as Secret Chief #4

== Production ==
Club Satan: The Witches Sabbath was produced by brothers Matt and Mark Zane for Extreme Associates. The Zane Brothers' cousin, Rob Black, was the owner of Extreme Associates and, according to director Shane Bugbee, the only pornographer who would listen to Bugbee's pitch for Club Satan. On working with Extreme Associates, Bugbee noted, "As far as creativity went, it was really freeing over there. It was very nice." According to Matt, Bugbee's goal for the film was not to disgust viewers with repulsive acts but to destroy "the psychological and emotional taboos that society has set forth and engrained with endless social programming." Matt further stated, "This is not porn for mere entertainment, this has a philosophy within it." Bugbee's inspirations for the film included the Marquis de Sade and the Nancy Friday book Men in Love, Men's Sexual Fantasies: The Triumph of Love Over Rage.

Joel Jet was the still photographer for Club Satan and allegedly stormed off the set in disgust due to being uncomfortable with the film "crossing the line" between pornography and religion, an incident corroborated by actor Rick Masters. The film's editing and post-production were handled by Hart D. Fisher of Crime Pays, Inc., allegedly after Extreme Associates' in-house editor "wouldn't touch it."

Club Satan was the film debut of the black metal band Dark Funeral, who contributed their song "King Antichrist" to the soundtrack of Club Satan. The band's scenes were shot both before and during a performance that they held at the Key Club in Hollywood, Los Angeles, on January 21, 2007. During the show, the band subjected Paris Gables, the star of Club Satan, to a mock human sacrifice in the name of Satan. On the band's inclusion in the film, Bugbee stated, "Their music sets a serious vibe... it has power and an almost supernatural energy; an energy that has emotions and inspires action."

In a press release by Extreme Associates, it was claimed that actors Kyle Stone and Rick Masters had both walked off the set of the film in disgust over a scene in which a ceramic bust of Jesus was ejaculated upon and smashed, with Masters having allegedly declared that Bugbee had "gone too far." Stone and Masters both disputed this allegation, with both men claiming that they had not left the film's set and had not been asked to desecrate a bust of Jesus. Stone and Masters both asserted that they would not have done so, even if asked, with Stone stating, "I'm not a big fan of organized religion, but I'm not going to step on anybody else's beliefs, either." In another press release, star Paris Gables claimed to have had an out-of-body experience during the film's climactic Black Mass and declared, "Since that shoot I have had endless nightmares, bad karma and a sinking feeling deep within my stomach. I see things at night around every corner and wonder if I am going even crazier than I already am. I think I need an exorcism!"

To promote the film, a website, www.clubsatan.com, was launched in February 2007. Visitors to the website could enter a contest to create their own trailers for Club Satan, with the contest's winner getting the chance to be flown out to Los Angeles to direct a pornographic film scene for Extreme Associates. The website also contained a teaser trailer, picture and poster downloads, and samples of the soundtrack for Club Satan.

Bugbee, in the weeks preceding the film's release, feuded with detractors on Blabbermouth.net, as well as with the creators of Phallusifer—The Immoral Code, another Satanic black metal adult film that was also released in March 2007.

== Release ==
Club Satan: The Witches Sabbath was released direct-to-video by Extreme Associates on March 21, 2007, after initially being announced for release on March 25. The release was celebrated with a party held at the Hollywood, Los Angeles club Ivar that featured "massive insane visuals, multi-media art shows, bondage, S&M and mind numbing explosions of the best industrial music available."

Disputes with distributors led to two versions of Club Satan being released: a standard one, available for purchase from most adult film retailers, and a Director's Cut, only available for purchase online and through video on demand from Extreme Associates. The Director's Cut contains footage of fisting and "pissing nuns" as well as a "Cum Christ Scene." The physical editions of the Director's Cut came packaged with a bonus CD soundtrack containing songs by Acheron, Crypt 33, Dark Funeral, Electric Wizard, Fuckemos, Heathen Barrett Urban, Namsilat, Society 1, and Wicked Little Dolls.

The Director's Cut of Club Satan was screened in New York City, Chicago, Detroit, and Asbury Park, New Jersey, in celebration of Walpurgis Night on April 30, 2007. An afterparty was held in Chicago at Exit 1315 W. North Avenue. Other screenings for the film's Director's Cut were announced for Los Angeles, Las Vegas, Salt Lake City, Atlanta, Austin, and Portland.

According to producer Matt Zane, the film did not sell as well as expected, with Zane lamenting, "The press and interest was there, but getting that movie placed in stores was next to impossible."

== Reception ==
AVN gave Club Satan: The Witches Sabbath a score of 4/5 and wrote, "With a metal soundtrack, dark lighting, grainy effects and Paris Gables playing the role of an uncontrollable nymphomaniac who submits herself to the will of the Christian faith, score one for the Satanists." Oren Cohen, the owner of TightFit Productions, similarly praised the film, writing, "It's amazing—to say that Shane's done a lot with a little is an understatement." Denis Sheehan of Askew Reviews praised Paris Gables's performance and the film's "hectic" atmosphere and concluded, "Loaded with occult rituals, sacrilegious behavior, and backed with a black/death metal soundtrack, Club Satan certainly is not a movie for the faint of heart, or even the seasoned porno veteran." While ViceList commended all but the film's first and final sex scenes, it also opined, "There is this constant attempt from EA to put out movies that combine hardcore sex with an anti-religious message. And with each flick, there seems to be more set-ups and far less sex. At some point, you have to realize that you're not making porn anymore and just save the sex for something filthier. Nobody wants to be preached at while they're jerking off."

The film was nominated for Most Outrageous Sex Scene at the 25th AVN Awards, but lost to Ass Blasting Felching Anal Whores.
