= Abyss =

Abyss may refer to:

== Religion ==
- Abyss (religion), a bottomless pit, or a passage to the underworld
- Abyss (Thelema), a spiritual principle within the system of Thelema

== Film and television ==
- The Abyss (1910 film), a Danish silent film starring Asta Nielsen
- The Abyss (1988 film) (L'Œuvre au noir), a French-Belgian film
- The Abyss, a 1989 film directed by James Cameron
- Abyss (2000 film), an American pornographic film
- The Abyss (2023 film), a Swedish film starring Tuva Novotny
- Abyss (TV series), a 2019 South Korean television series

=== Episodes ===
- "The Abyss" (Captain Power and the Soldiers of the Future), 1987
- "The Abyss" (Entourage), 2005
- "The Abyss" (NCIS: New Orleans), 2015
- "The Abyss" (The Punisher), 2019
- "Abyss" (Stargate SG-1), 2002

== Games ==
- Abyss (Dungeons & Dragons), a plane of the Dungeons & Dragons roleplaying games
- Abyss (Flying Buffalo), a 1980 role-playing game adventure for Tunnels & Trolls
- Abyss (magazine), a defunct gaming magazine
- Abyss, a flight map in Aion
- Abyss, the final boss character of Marvel vs. Capcom 2
- Abyss or Zasalamel, a character in Soulcalibur III
- "The Abyss", a content update for No Man's Sky
- "The Abyss", an area in the video game Hollow Knight
- "The Abyss", an area in the video game Dark Souls
- "The Abyss Order", a faction within the video game Genshin Impact

== Literature and comics ==
- The Abyss (Card novel), by Orson Scott Card, a novelization of the 1989 James Cameron film
- The Abyss (Yourcenar novel), a 1968 historical novel by Marguerite Yourcenar
- Abyss (Weddle and Lang novel), a 2001 Star Trek novel
- Abyss (Denning novel), a 2009 Star Wars novel
- "The Abyss", a 1941 horror short story by Robert A. W. Lowndes
- Abyss (comics), various characters in the Marvel Universe
- The Abyss, a supernatural prison in the Japanese anime/manga Pandora Hearts
- The Abyss, the titular setting of the Japanese anime/manga Made in Abyss

== Music ==
- The Abyss (band), an American alternative rock band
- The Abyss (musical project), a black metal side project of the Swedish death metal band Hypocrisy
- The Abyss (recording studio), a recording studio owned by Swedish musician Peter Tägtgren
- Abyss, the talent agency that represents the South Korean performing artist Sandara Park

=== Albums ===
- Abyss (Ad Infinitum album), 2024
- Abyss (Chelsea Wolfe album) or the title song, 2015
- Abyss (Lionsheart album) or the title song, 2004
- Abyss (Unleash the Archers album) or the title song, 2020
- The Abyss (album), by natori, or the title song, 2026

=== Songs ===
- "Abyss", a song by Amberian Dawn from Darkness of Eternity
- "Abyss", a song by Circus Maximus from Isolate
- "Abyss", a song by D'espairsRay from Monsters
- "Abyss", a song by Jin
- "Abyss", a song by Stratovarius from Dreamspace
- "Abyss", a song by The-Dream from Love King
- "Abyss", a song by Wolfheart from Shadow World
- "Abyss", a song by Woodz
- "The Abyss", a song by The Weeknd and Lana Del Rey from Hurry Up Tomorrow
- "The Abyss", a song by Accept from Blood of the Nations
- "The Abyss", a song by August Burns Red from Death Below
- "The Abyss", a song by Cypecore from Identity
- "The Abyss", a song by Hypocrisy from The Arrival
- "The Abyss", a song by Sepultura from Schizophrenia

== Other uses ==
- Abyss (roller coaster), at Adventure World in Perth, Western Australia
- Abyss (wrestler) (born 1973), ring name of professional wrestler Chris Park
- AUV Abyss, an autonomous underwater research vehicle
- Abyss, in heraldry, the exact middle of an escutcheon
- "The Abyss", an episode of the Canadian podcast Someone Knows Something

== See also ==
- Abysmal, a 2015 album by The Black Dahlia Murder
- "Abysmal", a song by The Haunted from Revolver
- "Abyssal", a song by Fleshgod Apocalypse from Mafia
- Abyssal plain, a flat area on the ocean floor
- Abyssal zone, a deep extent of the sea
- Into the Abyss (disambiguation)
- Bezdna (disambiguation), Russian for "Abyss"
