= Last Breath =

Last Breath or The Last Breath may refer to:

== Books ==
- Last Breath, Morganville Vampires novel by Rachel Caine, 2011
- The Last Breath, Paddy Meehan novel by Denise Mina, 2012
- Last Breath, novel by Tunku Halim, 2014
- "Last Breath" (short story), by Joe Hill, 2014 (concerning a Dr. Allinger whose "Museum of Silence" contains the last breaths of various people)

== Film ==
- The Last Breath (1999 film), a Canadian drama film originally titled Le Dernier souffle (Montreal police officer investigating murder in Arkansas)
- Last Breath (2000 film), a 2000 American pornographic horror film
- The Last Breath, also known as Epitaph, a 2007 South Korean horror film (Korea under Japanese rule in 1942)
- Saansein: The Last Breath 2016 romantic horror film starring Rajneesh Duggal (disappearing singer in Mauritius)
- Last Breath (2019 film), a documentary (deep sea divers rescuing colleague)
- Last Breath (2024 film), a drama film
- The Last Breath (2024 film), a survival thriller film (scuba divers stuck on a wreck)
- Last Breath (2025 film), a survival thriller film (deep sea divers rescuing colleague)

== Music ==
- "Last Breath" (Sevendust song), 2011
- "Last Breath" (Liamoo song), 2018
- "Last Breath" (Kanye West song), 2025/2026
- "Last Breath", song by Attack Attack! from Attack Attack! (2010)
- "Last Breath", song by Bleeding Through from Nine (2025)
- "Last Breath", song by Chelsea Grin from the album My Damnation (2011)
- "Last Breath", song by Hatebreed from Satisfaction Is the Death of Desire (1997)
- "Last Breath", song by Norther from Dreams of Endless War (2002)
- "Last Breath", song by Plain White T's from Wonders of the Younger (2010)
