= 18th AVN Awards =

US adult industry award ceremony in 2001

- DVD cover art of the recording of the 18th AVN Awards.
- Date: January 8, 2001
- Site: The Venetian Las Vegas at Paradise, Nevada, U.S.A.
- Hosted by: Jenna Jameson
- Preshow hosts: Chi Chi LaRue
- Produced by: Gary Miller
- Directed by: Mark Stone

Highlights
- Best Picture: Watchers (Best Film)
- Most awards: Dark Angels (6)
- Most nominations: Dream Quest (20)

The 18th AVN Awards ceremony, presented by Adult Video News (AVN), took place January 8, 2001 at the Venetian Hotel Grand Ballroom, at Paradise, Nevada, U.S.A. During the ceremony, AVN presented AVN Awards in 77 categories honoring the best pornographic films released between Oct. 1, 1999 and Sept. 30, 2000. The ceremony was produced by Gary Miller and directed by Mark Stone. Adult film star Jenna Jameson hosted the show for the second time.

The year's biggest winner was Dark Angels with six awards, including best Video Feature and Best Director—Video for Nic Andrews, however, Watchers won for Best Film while capturing three additional trophies. Other multiple winners included: Les Vampyres with five awards, Dream Quest with four and Raw and West Side each with three.

== Winners and nominees ==
The nominees for the 19th AVN Awards were announced in November 2000. Dream Quest led the way with 20, followed by Watchers with 18, Les Vampyres with 17, West Side with 16, Raw with 15, Dark Angels with 14, Jekyll and Hyde with 12 and A Midsummer Night's Cream, Artemesia and In the Days of Whore with 10 apiece.

The winners were announced during the awards ceremony on January 8, 2001.

=== Major awards ===
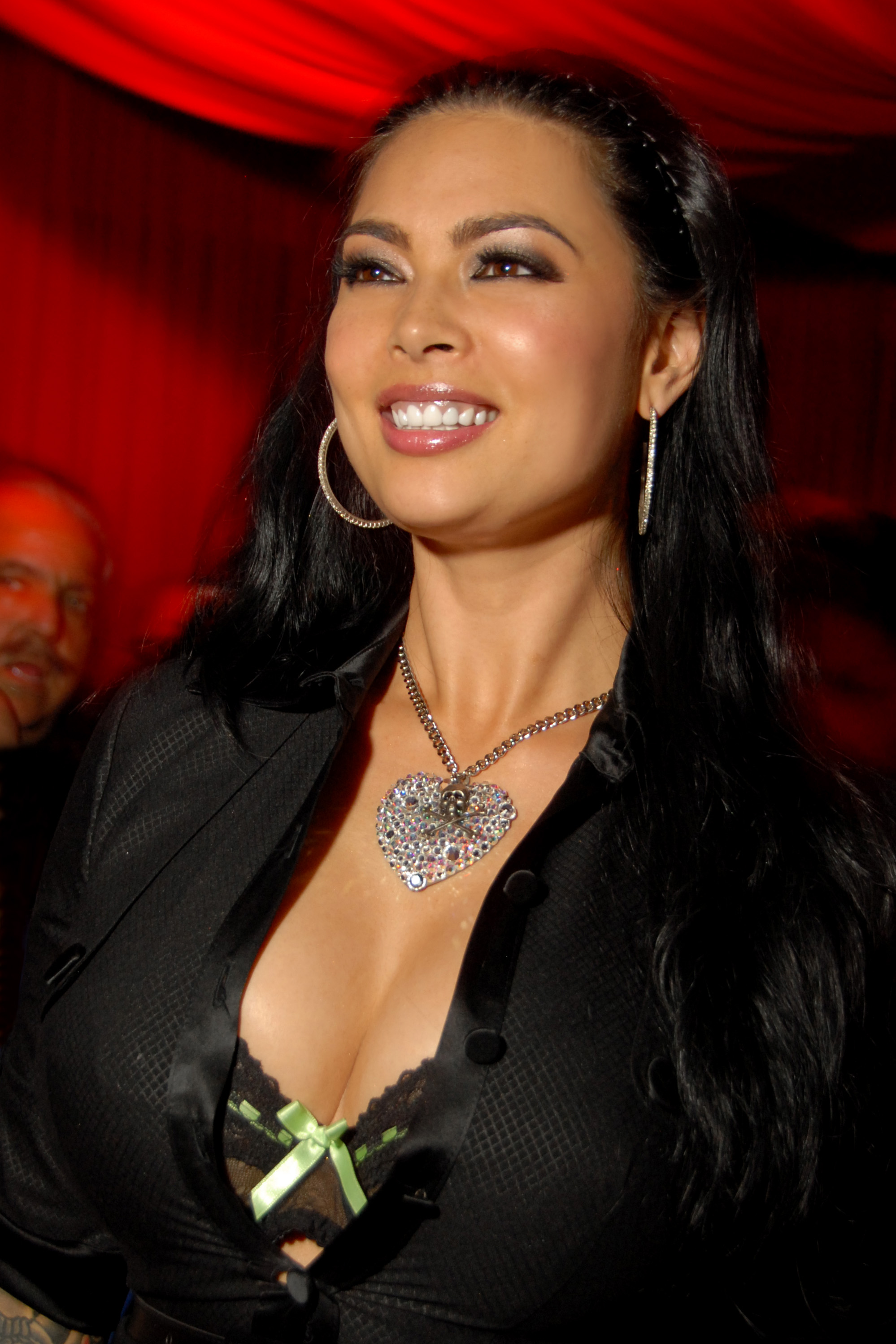
Tera Patrick, Best New Starlet winner

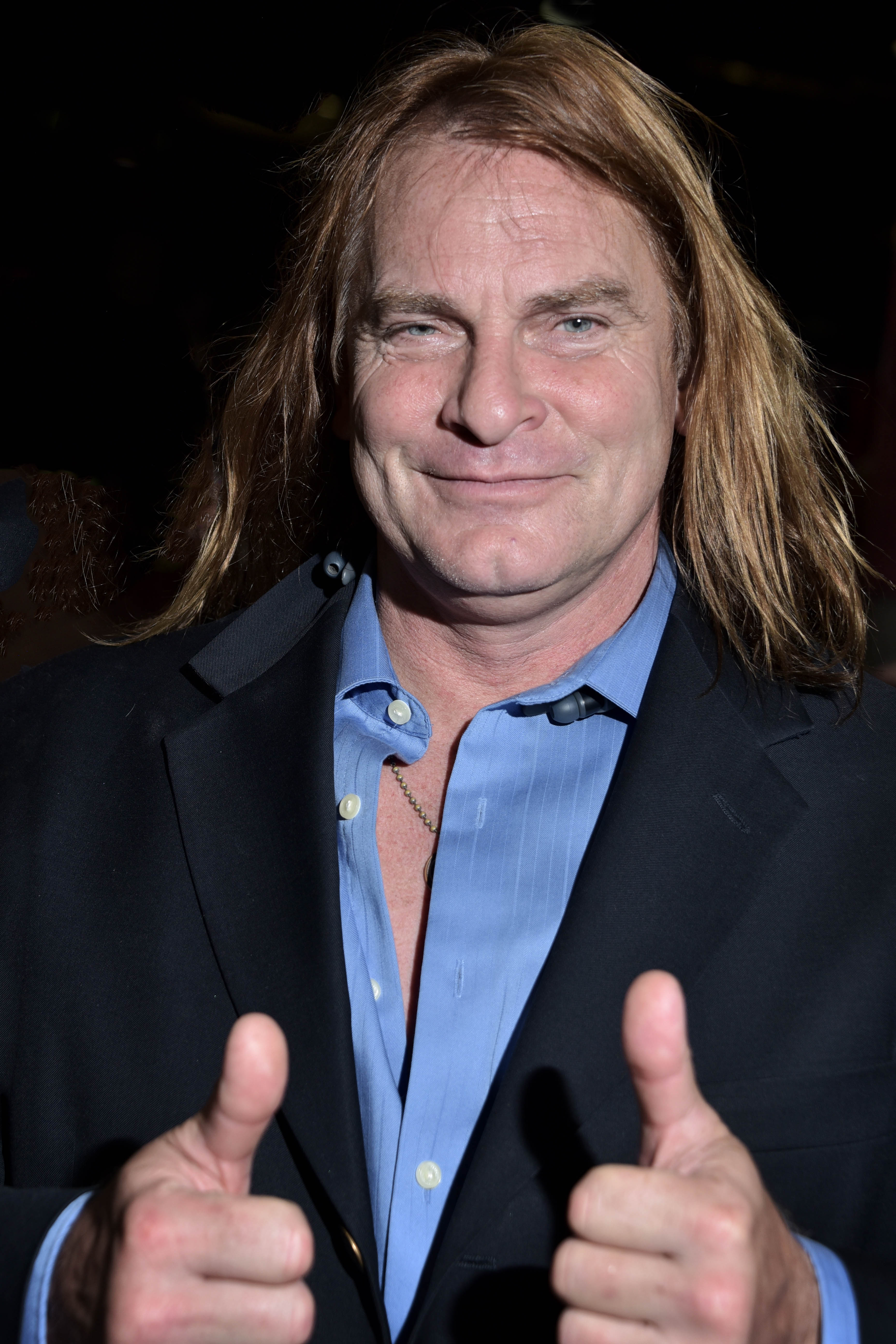
Evan Stone, Male Performer of the Year and Best Actor—Film winner

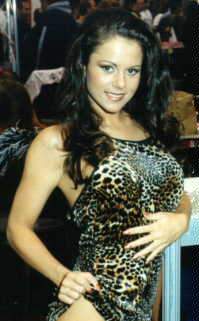
Jewel De'Nyle, Female Performer of the Year

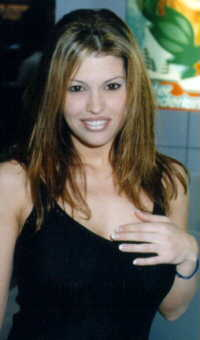
Taylor Hayes, Best Actress—Film co-winner

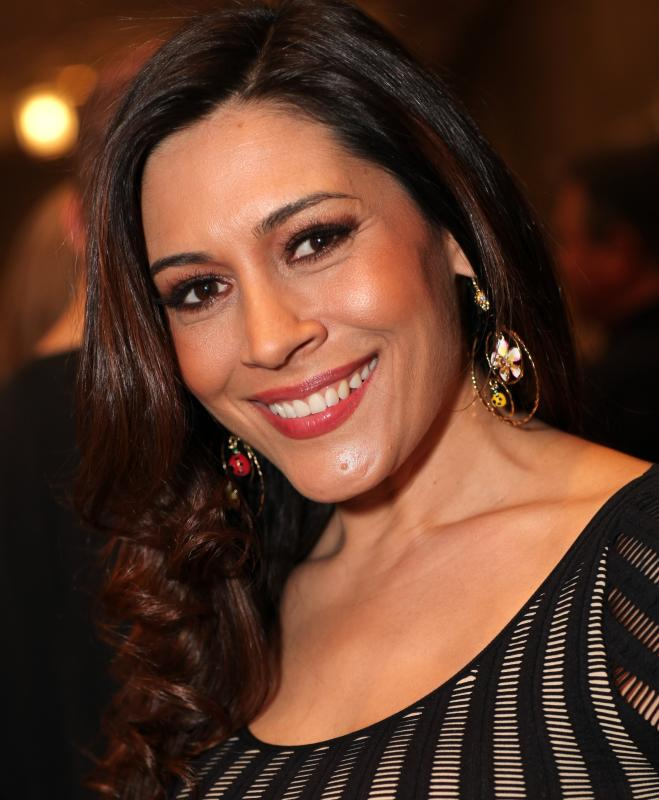
Raylene, Best Actress—Film co-winner

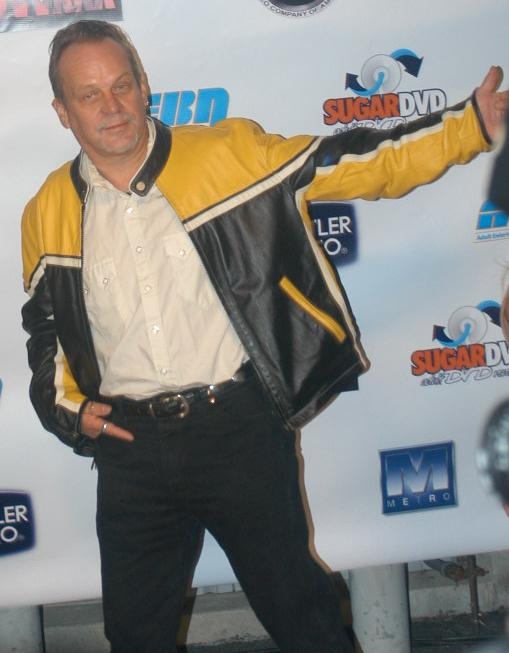
James Avalon, Best Director—Film winner

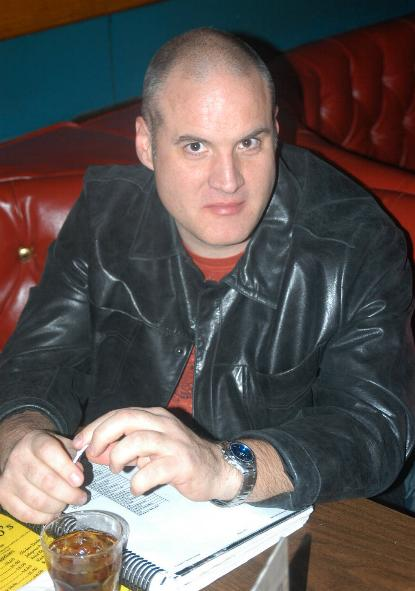
Michael Raven, Best Screenplay—Film winner

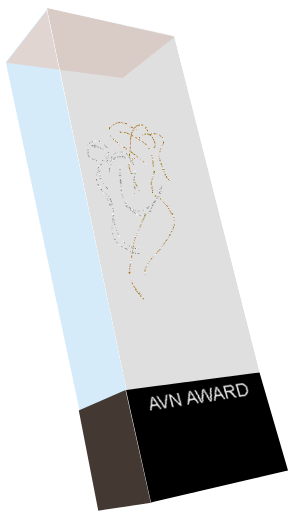
The new AVN Award trophy

Winners are listed first, highlighted in boldface, and indicated with a double dagger (‡).

Best Film	Best Video Feature
**Watchers**‡; Adrenaline; Artemesia; Dream Quest; Façade; Jekyll and Hyde; Les Vampyres; Looker 2: Femme Fatale; A Midsummer Night's Cream; Screamers; Secret Party	**Dark Angels**‡; Carnal Secrets; Goddaughter 5; In the Days of Whore; New Wave Hookers 6; Partners Forever; The Pushover; Raw; Shayla's Web; Spellbound; Taboo of Tarot; Trixxx 2; West Side; White Lightning
Best DVD	Best New Starlet
**Raw**‡; All Star; Boobsville.com; Dark Garden; Decadence; Double Feature; Dream Quest; Fetish Therapy; Jekyll and Hyde; Nothing to Hide 3 & 4; Sexual Species; Watchers; West Side; White Lightning; A Witch's Tail	**Tera Patrick**‡; Alexa; Cassidey; Dayton; Jessica Drake; Tasha Hunter; Miko Lee; Lola; Heather Lyn; Tiffany Mason; McKayla Matthews
Male Performer of the Year	Female Performer of the Year
**Evan Stone**‡; Mark Davis; Dillion Day; Erik Everhard; Max Hardcore; Dave Hardman; Luciano; Mr. Marcus; Rocco Siffredi; Randy Spears; Nacho Vidal	**Jewel De'Nyle**‡; Jessica Darlin; Dee; Bridgette Kerkove; Kristi Myst; Alexandra Quinn; Serenity; Sydnee Steele; Inari Vachs; Ava Vincent
Best Actor—Film	Best Actress—Film
**Evan Stone, Adrenaline**‡; Tyce Bune. True Blue; Dillion Day. Watchers; John Decker. Secret Party; Mike Foster. Jekyll and Hyde; Joel Lawrence. Les Vampyres; Herschel Savage. Dream Quest; Randy Spears. Façade; Bobby Vitale. Façade	**Taylor Hayes, Jekyll and Hyde**‡; **Raylene, Artemesia** (tie)‡; Nina Hartley, A Midsummer Night's Cream; Jenna Jameson, Dream Quest; Julie Meadows, Watchers; Sydnee Steele, Façade; Gwen Summers, Looker 2: Femme Fatale; Syren, Les Vampyres; Inari Vachs, Façade; Ava Vincent, Les Vampyres
Best Actor—Video	Best Actress—Video
**Joel Lawrence, Raw**‡; Tyce Bune, Wages of Sin; Dillion Day, Dark Angels; Mike Horner, Prisoner of Sex; Jonathan Morgan, Becoming Wet; Herschel Savage, Spellbound; Randy Spears, Partners Forever; Lexington Steele, West Side; Evan Stone, Paradise Hole; Tony Tedeschi, She Town	**Serenity, M: Caught In the Act**‡; Juli Ashton, Bliss; Asia Carrera, Goddaughter 5; Jewel De'Nyle, Dark Angels; Kylie Ireland, Raw; Devinn Lane, Spellbound; Ginger Lynn, White Lightning; Tera Patrick, Sex Island; Sydnee Steele, Dark Angels; Gwen Summers, Virgin Whore; Inari Vachs, West Side; Ava Vincent, Perfectly Flawless
Best Director—Film	Best Director—Video
**James Avalon, Les Vampyres**‡; Brad Armstrong, Dream Quest; Andrew Blake, Secret Paris; Stuart Canterbury, A Midsummer Night's Cream; Nic Cramer, Looker 2: Femme Fatale; Ralph Parfait, The Cult; Michael Raven, Watchers; Andre Richard, Screamers; Paul Thomas, Artemesia	**Nic Andrews, Dark Angels**‡; Brad Armstrong, Spellbound; Francois Clousot, Trixxx 02; Jim DiGiorgio, The Sopornos; Veronica Hart, White Lightning; Father John, Carnal Secrets; Bud Lee, Goddaughter 5; Cash Markman, A Lust in America; Michael Ninn, Shayla's Web; Antonio Passolini, Raw; Jace Rocker, The Pushover; Ren Savant, West Side, Nicholas Steele, Taboo of Tarot; Thomas Zupko, In the Days of Whore
Best Supporting Actress—Video	Best Sex Comedy
**Midori, West Side**‡; Alexa, Partners Forever; Juli Ashton, Best Friends; Chloe, White Lightning; Jeanna Fine, Ooze; Bridgette Kerkove, Out of Control; Anna Malle, A Witch's Tail; Sonja Redd, Goddaughter 5; Tabitha Stevens, Bride of Double Feature; Gwen Summers, Trailer Trash Nurses; Keri Windsor, The Collector	**M: Caught in the Act**‡; Big Island Blues; The Cellar Dweller 3; Debbie Does Iowa; A Lust in America; Porno Chick; Prisoner of Sex; The Sopornos; Super Quick
Top Selling Tape	Top Renting Tape
**Dream Quest**‡	**Dream Quest**‡
Hot Video Award (Best U.S. Release in France)	Best Foreign Release
**Tell Me What You Want**‡; Bliss; Chloé; Dark Garden; Double Feature; Playthings; Raw; Search for the Snow Leopard; Trial By Copulation	**Rocco: Animal Trainer 3**‡; Assquest 2; The Club; Dangerous Things; Fashion; The Inheritance; The Loves of Laure; Matador 4: Anal Garden; Rocco Meats an American Angel in Paris; Tease
Best All-Sex Film	Best All-Sex Video
**Erotica**‡; Decadence; House of Hooters; Lipstick; Pinups 2; Private Openings; Secret Paris	**Buttwoman vs. Buttwoman**‡; All Star; Cum Covered 4; Depraved Fantasies 7; Fresh Meat 8; Gangbang Auditions #5; In Style; Lust in Paradise I & II; Pickup Lines 47; Sexual Healing; Sodomania: Gangbang Edition; White Trash Whore 16; XXXtreme Fantasies of Jewel De'Nyle
Best Gonzo Release	Best Gonzo Series
**Please 12**‡; Ben Dover's Back To the Crack; Buttman's Big Tit Adventure 5; Cumback Pussy 29; Fresh Meat 8; Fuck 'Em All 3; Mission to Uranus; The Voyeur 16; The Watcher 10; Welcome to Chloeville; Whack Attack 8	**Please!**‡; Action Sports Sex; Ben Dover; Buttman; Fresh Meat; Freshman Fantasies; North Pole Series; Seymore Butts; The Voyeur; Whack Attack
Best Ethnic-Themed Series	Best Sex Scene in a Foreign Release
**Chica Boom**‡; Bootylicious; Booty Talk; Color Blind; Inner City Black Cheerleaders Search; Latinas Debutantes; More Black Dirty Debutantes; My Baby Got Back; Panochitas; Sugar; Sugar Walls; Super Freaks; United Colors of Ass; We Go Deep	**Jazmine, Nacho Vidal, Isabella, Buttman's Anal Divas**‡; Cynthia Palmers, John Walton, Bob Terminator, Karl Ben, Ass Quest; Nicole Thomson, Christie, David Perry, Buttman's Anal Divas; The Boat Orgy (Bruna Barcelli, Cassandra Wild, Isabella, Jazmine, Samantha Santos, Fabio Scorpion, Hatman, Joey Silvera, Nacho Vidal, Rocco Siffredi), Buttman & Rocco's Brazilian Buttfest; David Perry, Silvia Saint, Dangerous Things; Anal Gang Bang (Kelly, Martina Mercedes), Dirty Anal Kelly in Rome 2; Kathrine Count, David Perry, Richard Langin, Ian Scott, Euro Angels: Hardball 8; Laura Dark, Nacho Vidal, Vanessa, Fashion Sluts 14: The Lost Whores; Jazmine, Nacho Vidal, Fresh Meat 8; Russian Military Prison Scene, Hell, Whores and High Heels; Nacho Vidal, Ellen, Killer Pussy; Nikita, Christoph Clark, Obsession of Laure; Lea Martini, Katyana, Oceane, Richard, Private XXX 11; Savana, Carmen, Rocco Siffredi, Rocco Meats an American Angel in Paris; Princess, Cassandra, Rocco Siffredi, Rocco's True Anal Stories 11
Best All-Girl Sex Scene—Film	Best All-Girl Sex Scene—Video
**Ava Vincent, Syren, Les Vampyres**‡; Sky, Alexa Rae, Debbie Does New Orleans; Jenna Jameson, Stephanie Swift, Felecia, Dream Quest; Alexa, Jenna Jameson, Dream Quest; The Fairy Orgy (Amber Michaels, Cheyenne Silver, Ginger Paige, Nakita Kash, Nina Hartley, Shay Sweet), A Midsummer Night's Cream; Janine, Randi Rage, Pink Janine; Shay Sweet, Gina Ryder, Private Openings; Katja Kean, Ava Vincent, Virtuoso; Katja Kean, Shay Sweet, Watchers	**Sydnee Steele, Jewel De'Nyle, Dark Angels**‡; Emily, Coral Sands, Felecia, Tina Cheri, Bobbi Barron, Babes Illustrated 8; Charlene Aspen, Linda Diego, Daisy Chain, Buttwoman vs. Buttwoman; Brooke Hunter, Felecia, Angela Summers, Sydnee Steele, Temptress, Inari Vachs, Daisy Chain, Car Wash Angels 2; Chloe, Tina Tyler, Shelbee Myne, Chloe's "I Came, Did You?!!"; Juli Ashton, Shayla LaVeaux, Dee, Keri Windsor, the Sybian, Essentially Dee; Brittany Andrews, Chandler, Exotic and Erotic; Jackie Strano, C. C. Belle, Hard Love/ How To Fuck in High Heels; Kiki D'Aire, Ryan Conner, Monique DeMoan, New Wave Hookers 6; Bridgette Kerkove, Kylie Ireland, No Man's Land 32; Group Shower Scene, Ooze; Bridgette Kerkove, Sana Fey, Nikol, Pussyman's Decadent Divas 3; Shayla LaVeaux, Keri Windsor, Alexandra Nice, Shayla's Web; Jill Kelly, Daisy Chain, Amanda Rain, S.M.U.T. 16; The All-Girl Orgy (Bridgette Kerkove, Candy Apples, Coral Sands, Daisy Chain, Gwen Summers, Layla Jade, Vivi Anne), The Violation of Bridgette Kerkove
Best Couples Sex Scene—Film	Best Couples Sex Scene—Video
**Sydnee Steele, Bobby Vitale, Façade**‡; Jessica Drake, Evan Stone, Adrenaline; Halli Aston, Evan Stone, The Cult; Devin Wolf, Jenna Jameson, Dream Quest; Kira Kener, Erik Everhard, Façade; Joel Lawrence, Ava Vincent, Les Vampyres; Mickey G., Gwen Summers, Looker 2: Femme Fatale; Dee, Herschel Savage, Screamers; Azlea Antistia, John Decker, Secret Party; Dasha, Dillion Day, Shakespeare Revealed; Sydnee Steele, Randy Spears, Watchers	**Lexington Steele, Inari Vachs, West Side**‡; Jill Kelly, Eric Price, Carnal Secrets; Lola, Dillion Day, Chica Boom 3; Lexington Steele, Alexandria Quinn, Cumback Pussy 29; Ginger Paige, Voodoo, Dark Angels; Syren, Evan Stone, Intimate Expressions; Ginger Lynn, Voodoo, New Wave Hookers 6; Temptress, Randy Spears, Spellbound; Evan Stone, Envy, Taboo of Tarot; Randy West, Bridgette Hasek, Up and Cummers 72; Tera Patrick, Randy West, Up and Cummers 80; Midori, Dillion Day, West Side; Asia Carrera, John Decker, Wet Dreams 7; Lexington Steele, Alexandra Nice, Wickedgirl.com

=== Additional Award Winners ===
- Best All-Girl Feature: Hard Love/How to Fuck in High Heels
- Best All-Girl Series: The Violation of...
- Best Alternative Video: Dream Girls: Real Adventures 18
- Best Anal Sex Scene—Film: Randy Spears, Inari Vachs; Façade
- Best Anal Sex Scene—Video: "Kristi Myst's Anal Gang Bang" (Kristy Myst, Anthony Crane, Arnold Schwartzenpecker, Brandon Iron, Brian Surewood, Dick Nasty, Gino Greco, John Strong, Rod Fontana, Trevor Thompson, Valentino), In the Days of Whore
- Best Anal-Themed Feature: Rocco's True Anal Stories 11
- Best Anal-Themed Series: Rocco's True Anal Stories
- Best Art Direction—Film: Jekyll and Hyde
- Best Art Direction—Video: Shayla's Web
- Best Box Cover Concept: Les Vampyres, Cal Vista Films/Metro
- Best Cinematography: Ralph Parfait, Jake Jacobs; Dream Quest
- Best Classic Release on DVD: Chameleons Not the Sequel
- Best Continuing Video Series: Pick Up Lines, Hollywood Hardcore (tie)
- Best Director—Foreign Release: Tanya Hyde; Hell, Whores and High Heels (Pirate Video 10)
- Best DVD Extras: All Star
- Best Editing—Film: Michael Raven, Sammy Slater; Watchers
- Best Editing—Video: Nic Andrews, Dark Angels
- Best Ethnic-Themed Release: Panochitas 5
- Best Foreign Vignette Series: Private XXX
- Best Foreign Vignette Tape: Hell, Whores and High Heels (Pirate Video 10)
- Best Group Sex Scene—Film: Violet Luv, Wendi Knight, Brandon Iron; Les Vampyres
- Best Group Sex Scene—Video: Hakan Serbes, Alisha Klass, McKayla Matthews; Mission to Uranus
- Best Interactive DVD: Virtual Sex With Tera Patrick
- Best Music: Derik Andrews, Inversion 89; Dark Angels

- Best Non-Sex Performance—Film or Video: Rob Spallone, The Sopornos
- Best Oral-Themed Feature: Blowjob Adventures of Dr. Fellatio 26
- Best Oral-Themed Series: Blowjob Adventures of Dr. Fellatio
- Best Overall Marketing Campaign—Company Image: Vivid Entertainment Group
- Best Overall Marketing Campaign—Individual Title or Series: Les Vampyres, Cal Vista Films/Metro
- Best Packaging: Dream Quest, Wicked Pictures
- Best Pro-Am or Amateur Series: Up and Cummers
- Best Pro-Am or Amateur Tape: California College Student Bodies 16
- Best Screenplay—Film: Michael Raven, George Kaplan; Watchers
- Best Screenplay—Video: Antonio Passolini, Raw
- Best Solo Sex Scene: Devinn Lane, In Style
- Best Special Effects: Intimate Expressions
- Best Specialty Tape—Bondage and S/M: Humiliation of Heidi
- Best Specialty Tape—Big Bust: Harem Hooters
- Best Specialty Tape—Other Genre: Barefoot Confidential 8
- Best Specialty Tape—Spanking: Public Canings
- Best Supporting Actor—Film: Randy Spears, Watchers
- Best Supporting Actor—Video: Wilde Oscar, West Side
- Best Supporting Actress—Film: Chloe, True Blue
- Best Tease Performance: Jessica Drake, Shayla's Web
- Best Transsexual Tape: Rogue Adventures: Big Ass She-Males 7
- Best Videography: Nic Andrews, Jake Jacobs; Dark Angels
- Best Vignette Tape: Terrors from the Clit 2
- Best Vignette Series: Perverted Stories
- Most Outrageous Sex Scene: “The Detached Cock” with Bridgette Kerkove, Tyce Bune; In the Days of Whore

=== Honorary AVN Awards ===
==== Reuben Sturman Award ====
- Ed Powers, Mark Kernes

==== Hall of Fame ====
AVN Hall of Fame inductees for 2001 were: Kaitlyn Ashley, John T. Bone, Asia Carrera, Bud Lee, Shayla La Veaux, Clive McLean, Earl Miller, Tiffany Mynx, Reb Sawitz, Sunset Thomas, Bob Vosse, Honey Wilder, Sam Xavier

=== Multiple nominations and awards ===
The following releases received the most nominations.

Nominations	Movie
20	Dream Quest
18	Watchers
17	Les Vampyres
16	West Side
15	Raw
14	Dark Angels
12	Jekyll and Hyde
10	A Midsummer Night’s Cream
10	Artemesia
10	In the Days of Whore
9	Spellbound
9	White Lightning
8	Adrenaline
8	Goddaughter 5
8	Screamers
8	Shayla's Web

The following 15 releases received multiple awards:

Awards	Movie
6	Dark Angels
5	Les Vampyres
4	Dream Quest
4	Watchers
3	Raw
3	West Side
2	Blowjob Adventures of Dr. Fellatio 26
2	Façade
2	Hell, Whores and High Heels (Pirate Video 10)
2	In the Days of Whore
2	Jekyll and Hyde
2	M: Caught In the Act
2	Please 12
2	Rocco's True Anal Stories 11
2	Shayla's Web

== Presenters and performers ==
The following individuals presented awards or performed musical numbers or comedy. The show's trophy girls were Haven and Lacey.

=== Presenters (in order of appearance) ===
Name(s)	Role
Chloe; Crystal Knight; Lee Stone	Presenters of the awards for Best Couples Sex Scene—Film and Best Couples Sex Scene—Video
Dee; Mikko Lee	Presenters of the awards for Best Gonzo Series and Best Ethnic-Themed Series
Dayton; Nicole Sheridan	Presenters of the awards for Best All-Girl Sex Scene—Video and Best All-Girl Sex Scene—Film
Ron Jeremy	Presenter of the awards for Best Renting Tape and Best Selling Tape
Brittany Andrews; Mike Saccone	Presenters of the award for Best Sex Comedy
Jewel De'Nyle; Shyla Fox	Presenters of the award for Best DVD
Taylor Hayes; Ben Dover	Presenters of the awards for Best Sex Scene in a Foreign Release and Best Foreign Release
Sydnee Steele; Dascha; Dillion Day	Presenters of the award for Best Supporting Actress—Video
Paul Fishbein	Presenter of the Hall of Fame honors and first Reuben Sturman Memorial Award
Al Goldstein	Presenters of the second Reuben Sturman Memorial Award
Alexa; Raylene; Dale DaBone	Presenters of the awards for Best Actor—Video and Best Actress—Video
Bridgette Kerkove	Presenter of the Best New Starlet Award
Mickey G. Lola; Charlie	Presenters of the awards for Best Actor—Film and Best Actress—Film
Alec Metro; Cassidey; Mikayla Matthews	Presenters of the awards for Male Performer of the Year and Female Performer of the Year
Mark Davis; Juliet Cariaga; Ashley Degenford	Presenters of the award for Best Director—Film and Best Director—Video
Midori; Kid Vegas	Presenters of the awards for Best All-Sex Film, Best All-Sex Video and Best Gonzo Video
Jessica Drake; Ava Vincent; Evan Stone	Presenters of the awards for Best Video Feature and Best Film

=== Performers ===
Name(s)	Role	Performed
Mike Saccone	Performer	Standup comedy segment
Planet Eater	Performers	Musical numbers

== Ceremony information ==
The awards show marked the premiere of its new trophy design, which Adult Video News called "an original 3-D Lucite monolith that hailed the long awaited Demise of the Golden Bitch."

The year's show featured a "Pussy Cam", a floor-level camera near the stage's podium, which offered attendees an infrequent glimpse of female stars lingerie or lack thereof. In his moment at the podium, actor Mark Davis offered female attendees equal time by dropping his trousers for the audience's supposed benefit.

The show was recorded and a DVD of the show was published and distributed by VCA Interactive.

=== Performance of year's movies ===
Dream Quest was announced as the adult movie industry's top selling movie and was also the top renting movie of the previous year.

=== Critical reviews ===
The show received a negative reception from Adult DVD Talk. An article by Groundskeeper Willie was titled, "The Adult Video Snooze Awards" and besides having found the show slow and monotonous with occasional gaffes, he also took organizers to task for not using film or video clips during the show, even in the major categories.

Hustler magazine agreed that "the ceremony dragged on for what seemed like an eternity but still managed to entertain, despite the shaky hositn gskills of cock-shy Jenna Jameson" and also decried the $195 fee for admission tickets.
