= Into the Abyss =

Into the Abyss may refer to:

- Into the Abyss (book), a 2012 non-fiction book by Carol Shaben
- Into the Abyss (film), a 2011 documentary by Werner Herzog
- Into the Abyss (album), a 2000 album by Hypocrisy
- "Into the Abyss" (song), a 1982 song by Sex Gang Children
- Into the Abyss, an upcoming game based on season 2 of Guardians Evolution
- "Into the Abyss", an episode of the 2008 BBC series Pacific Abyss

== See also ==
- Abyss (disambiguation)
- "In the Abyss", an 1896 short story by H. G. Wells
- "Made in Abyss", a 2012 til present manga by Akihito Tsukushi about entering into an abyss
