= David Aaron Clark =

American pornographic actor

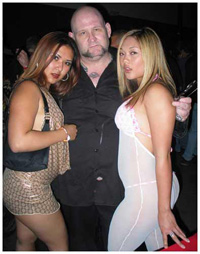
- David Aaron Clark and friends
- Born: September 5, 1960; Camden, New Jersey, U.S.
- Died: November 28, 2009 (aged 49); Los Angeles, California, U.S.
- Occupations: Director, actor, musician

David Aaron Clark (September 5, 1960 – November 28, 2009) was an author, musician, pornographic actor, and pornographic video director.

== Career ==
Switching majors and finally graduating with a degree in journalism in 1986. He served as editor-in-chief of The Daily Targum, Rutgers' student newspaper, winning multiple Columbia Scholastic Press Association College Gold Circle Awards.

Clark then worked as a stringer at The Bergen Record and the New Brunswick Home News Tribune before becoming an online editor at Dow Jones News Service. He left after two years to accept an editorial position at Genesis magazine, followed by a five-year tenure at Al Goldstein's Screw magazine.

Clark also edited the fanzine Chrome on Fire, and performed in the band False Virgins, produced by Sonic Youth guitarist Lee Ranaldo. The band released two albums at the turn of the decade -The 1990 album Skin Job, engineered by Brooklyn producer Martin Bisi. When the lead singer committed suicide, Clark broke up the band and retired from playing music.

Clark wrote several works of erotic fiction, including The Wet Forever about the relationship between a hedonistic man (Janus) and a dominatrix (Madchen).

He moved to San Francisco in 1995 and was hired for an editorial position at the now-defunct The Spectator.

In 1998 he moved to Los Angeles to accept a position directing porn videos for John T. Bone’s Cream Studios. His screenplay for Brad Armstrong’s Euphoria won an AVN Award for Best Screenplay in 2000. He has directed features for companies ranging from Extreme Associates to Vivid Video.

In an interview with Luke Ford Clark said:

I graduated from Rutgers with a double major in journalism and art. Once I found out that I couldn't paint or draw, I decided to become a serious journalist. I wrote for two years for the Dow Jones news service in New Jersey, then switched to Genesis in 1988 and wrote for a friend. He was my college roommate who now edited Genesis. I was bored and looking for something else to write about other than planning commission meetings and human interest stories on missing children, gun shows, etc. From there I went on to Screw. I lead a flamboyant personal lifestyle that meshes with my work. In New York I was seeing and eventually got engaged to a teenage dominatrix who slashed me with a knife when she was angry. The story hit the tabloids like the New York Post. Their headline read - "Porn Editor Cut Up By Kinky Cutie." It showed my picture. We moved to San Francisco to get out of the news and I was with her until October, 1995.

His most recent film, PURE, for Evil Angel, received multiple AVN nominations, including Best Actor (Keni Styles), Best Actress (Asa Akira), Best Supporting Actor (Jake Malone), Best Couples Sex Scene, Best Music Soundtrack, Best Special Effects, Best Screenplay, Best Director – Feature and Best Video Feature.

He died suddenly on November 28, 2009, reportedly as the result of a pulmonary embolism.

== Bibliography ==
=== Novels ===
- The Wet Forever (1991, Rhinoceros Publications reissue 1995) ISBN 1-56333-117-9
- Sister Radiance (1992, Rhinoceros reissue 1994) ISBN 1-56333-215-9
- The Marquis de Sade's Juliette: Vengeance On The Lord (1993, Masquerade books 1996) ISBN 1-56333-240-X
- Into The Black (Titan Books, London) (1995) ISBN 1-85286-679-9

=== Collaborations ===
- Ritual Sex (Co-edit with Tristan Taormino) (Masquerade Books, 1995) ISBN 1-56333-391-0
- True Blood (Text with Charles Gatewood photography, 1997, Last Gasp Books) ISBN 0-86719-447-2
- The Fallen: The Pale Door (Graphic novel, illustrated by Miran Kim) (NBM/Nantier Beall Minoustchine Publishing, 1999) ISBN 1-56163-233-3
- The Fallen: Cold Religion (Graphic novel, illustrated by David Rankin, 2000, 2004) ISBN 1-56163-406-9

=== Anthology appearances ===
- Gahan Wilson’s the Ultimate Haunted House (Byron Preiss Press) ISBN 0-06-105315-5
- World’s Best Erotica (Titan Books)
- Best Of Gauntlet Magazine (Richard Kasak Books)

== Music releases ==
- False Virgins, SKINJOB (1990, Enemy Records)
- False Virgins, INFERNAL DOLL (1991, Enemy Records)
