= Kendra Jade Rossi =

American actress

Kendra Jade
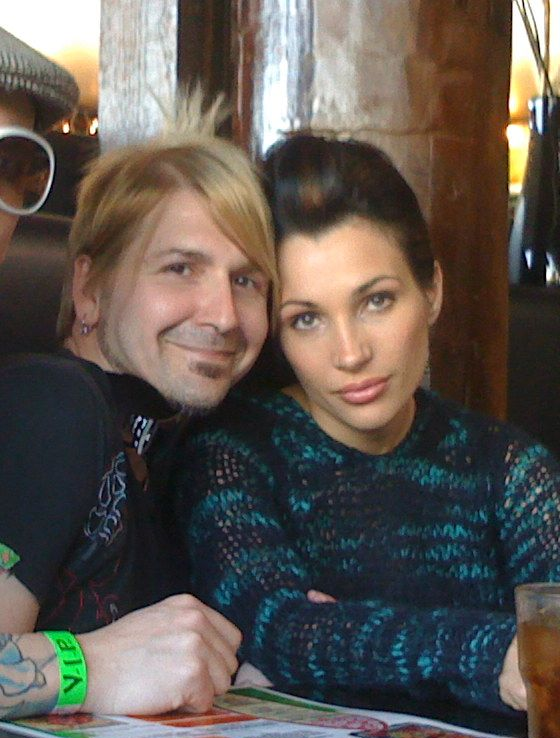
- Jade in 2009
- Born: April 19, 1977 (age 49); Northampton, Massachusetts, U.S.
- Occupations: Model; actress; adult film star
- Spouse: Lukas Rossi (m. 2007; div. 2021)

Kendra Jade (born April 19, 1977) is an American model, actress, and former adult film star. Jade appeared on the VH1 reality television series Sex Rehab with Dr. Drew and Sober House. During these shows, Jade was treated for sex addiction and alcoholism by Dr. Drew Pinsky.

== Career ==
Jade is credited with many film, television and music videos but is most notably known for her reality television appearances for several seasons on VH1's Sober House and she is one of the women with the most appearances on the Howard Stern Radio Show. She was the featured star of the final issue of the Carnal Comics True Stories of Adult Film Stars line. Dropping out of the adult entertainment industry in 2001, Jade began touring throughout the country as the featured burlesque performer in gentlemen's clubs. She has appeared in music videos, feature films, magazines, radio, print, and television. She appeared in the music video for the band Disturbed titled "Remember", as well as Everclear's "The Boys are Back in Town" for the movie Detroit Rock City.

She is an activist in animal rights issues and operates her own animal rescue.

== Personal life ==
Jade moved to Southern California in her early twenties and quickly became a star in adult films. She fell into the Hollywood party scene and was once linked to a sex tape scandal involving Jerry Springer.

Jade met Canadian singer-songwriter Lukas Rossi soon after he landed the lead singer position with Rock Star Supernova, the reality television-formed supergroup featuring Tommy Lee, Gilby Clarke, and Jason Newsted. The two were introduced by mutual friends Tommy Lee and Dave Navarro in 2006 and were married in May 2007.

In a 2015 interview with ET Canada, Jade's husband Lukas announced the couple had adopted a son named Bryden.

In 2021, Kendra and husband Lukas divorced.

== Film ==
- Wind Song (1998)
- Royal Rumble (1999)
- WWF Royal Rumble: No Chance In Hell (1999)
- Ass Clowns (2000)
- Being Ron Jeremy (2003)

== TV ==
- Howard Stern (13 episodes 1997–2002)
- Howard Stern on Demand (2006)
- Sex Rehab with Dr. Drew (2009)
- Celebrity Rehab Presents Sober House (2010)
