= Simon Iff =

Protagonist in a series of short detective stories by Aleister Crowley

Simon Iff is the protagonist of a series of short detective stories written by occultist Aleister Crowley. He is portrayed as a mystic, magician, world traveller, high society figure and great detective who is advanced in years but possesses a thorough insight into human psychology. According to publisher, editor and Crowley scholar William Breeze, the character is based on Crowley's idealised self-image of his own old age.

The stories typically revolve around an apparently unsolvable crime, which is eventually untangled by Iff's magical and psychological logic. Crowley explained the method of crafting a Simon Iff story in simple terms:

Think of a situation as inexplicable as possible, then to stop up all the chinks with putty, and having satisfied myself that no explanation was possible, to make a further effort and find one.

== Publication history ==
The Simon Iff stories were written during a visit to New Orleans in December 1916, primarily as a means of alleviating Crowley's financial hardships. The mystic was verging on bankruptcy, a result of his lifestyle, and extravagant self-publishing, while having never earned a wage. The initial collection of six stories which Crowley penned would be labelled The Scrutinies of Simon Iff. Crowley would later write twelve more stories under the title Simon Iff in America, six stories as Simon Iff Abroad, and two final stories as Simon Iff Psychoanalyst. The Scrutinies of Simon Iff were first published in 1917–1918 in the New York publication The International under the pseudonym Edward Kelly (presumably a nod to Edward Kelley, the Elizabethan alchemist and enochian magician). There is an edition of The Scrutinies of Simon Iff published by Teitan Press; while a 2012 Wordsworth Editions release under their "Tales of Mystery & the Supernatural" line, contains the complete works.

Simon Iff also appears in Crowley's most widely read novel Moonchild (1929).
