= Bezdna =

Bezdna (Russian: Бездна: abyss) may refer to:

- Bezdna (Chuvashia) (Chuvash: Пасна), a tributary of the Sura
- Bezdna (Tatarstan) (Tatar: Бизнә), a tributary of the Volga
- former name of Antonovka, Spassky District, Tatarstan, Russia

== See also ==
- Bezdna Unrest, a protest by serfs in the Russian Empire centered on the village that is now Antonovka
