= Jewel De'Nyle =

American pornographic film actress

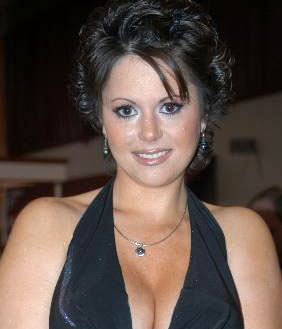
- De'Nyle in 2005
- Occupations: Pornographic film actress; director

Jewel De'Nyle is an American former pornographic film actress and director. She is a member of the NightMoves, AVN, and XRCO Halls of Fame.

== Career ==
In 2000, De'Nyle made her directorial debut with XXXtreme Fantasies of Jewel De'Nyle for New Sensations before parting ways with the studio. Later that year, she co-wrote and co-produced Bound by Blood for Extreme Associates and started a series for Jill Kelly Productions titled Sluts of the Nyle.

Her mother was also a pornographic film actress going by the name De'Bella. By the start of the 2008 AVN Adult Entertainment Expo they had reconciled their differences, with De'Nyle saying that the biggest part of their reconciliation came when De'Bella left Platinum X Pictures.

In January 2003, she became a founding part-owner of the porn studio Platinum X Pictures, located in the San Fernando Valley of California. De'Nyle left Platinum X in June 2006.

== Personal life ==
De'Nyle was born to Debbie Schwarz, who was 19 at the time of her birth. De'Nyle was later adopted by Larry Jack Schwarz, a former Republican Colorado state legislator.

She was the co-owner of Platinum X Productions while her mother was the sales director.

In September 2005, she was reported to be "newly married" in New York.

== Awards ==
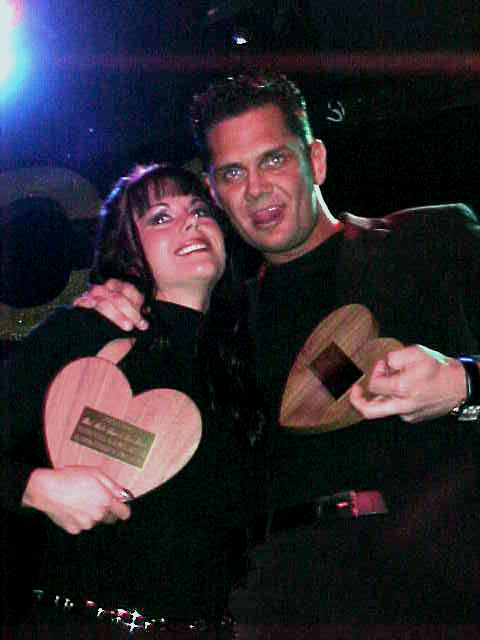
De'Nyle and Nacho Vidal holding their XRCO Award trophies for Best Male-Female Sex Scene in 2001

- 1999 NightMoves Award – Best New Starlet (Editor's Choice)
- 2000 XRCO Award – Best New Starlet
- 2001 AVN Award – Female Performer of the Year
- 2001 AVN Award – Best All Girl Sex Scene, Video (Dark Angels) with Sydnee Steele
- 2001 XRCO Award – Female Performer of the Year
- 2001 XRCO Award – Best Male-Female Sex Scene (Xxxtreme Fantasies of Jewel De'Nyle) with Nacho Vidal
- 2002 XRCO Award – Female Performer of the Year
- 2002 XRCO Award – Orgasmic Analist
- 2002 XRCO Award – Best Girl/Girl Sex Scene (No Man's Land 33) with Inari Vachs
- 2002 NightMoves Award – Best Actress (Fan's Choice)
- 2003 AVN Award – Best Anal Sex Scene, Video (Babes in Pornland 5: Interracial Babes) with Lexington Steele
- 2004 XRCO Award – Best Sex Scene, Couple (Babes in Pornland 14: Bubble Butt Babes) with Manuel Ferrara
- 2004 Adam Film World Guide Award – Directrix of the Year
- 2005 Adam Film World Guide Award – Directrix of the Year
- 2007 NightMoves Hall of Fame inductee
- 2009 AVN Hall of Fame inductee
- 2009 XRCO Hall of Fame inductee
