= Gauge (actress) =

American dancer and pornographic film actor

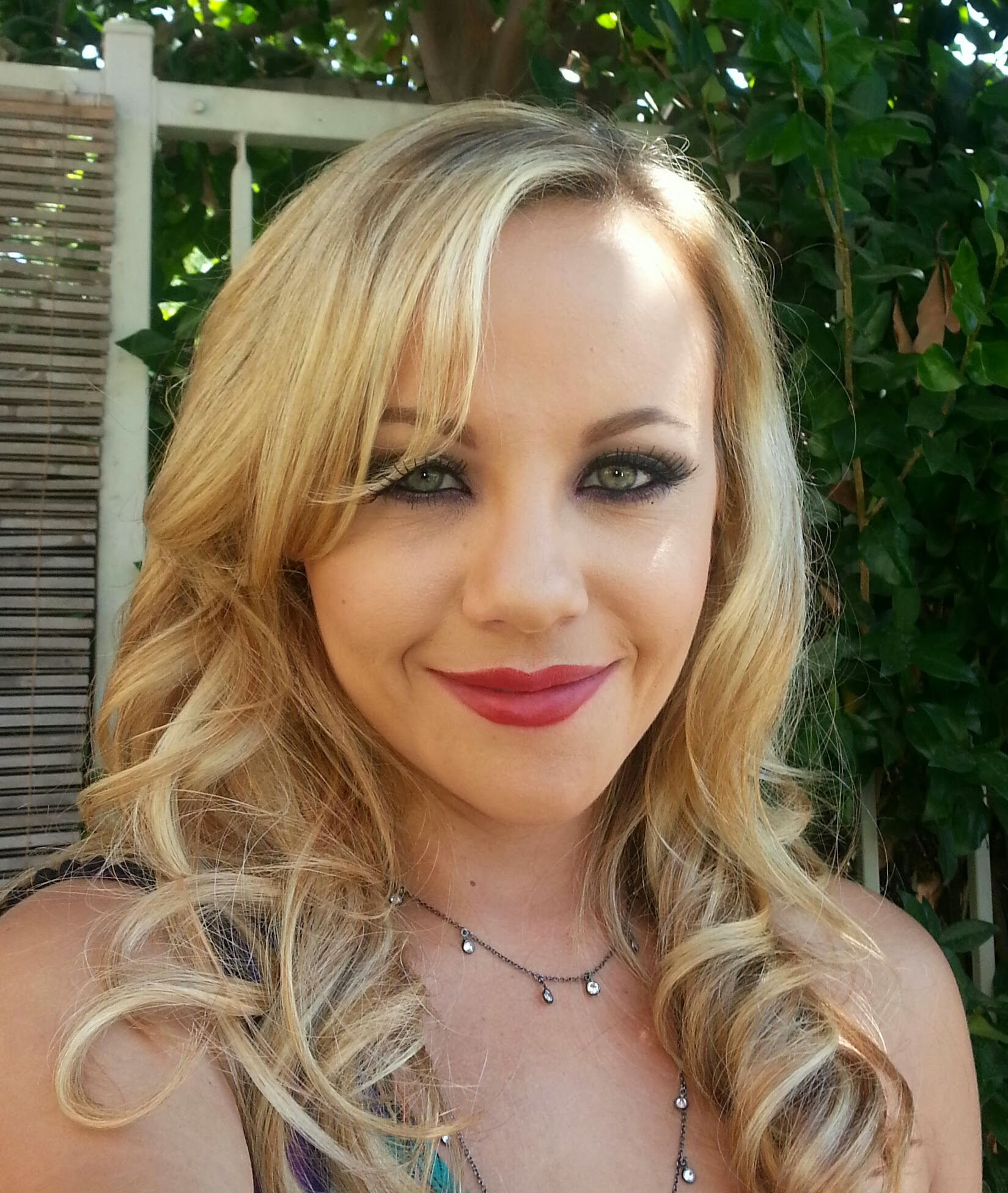
- Gauge in 2013
- Occupation: Pornographic film actress

Gauge is an American former pornographic film actress.

== Career ==
After having appeared in about 140 movies, Gauge left the pornographic film industry in 2005 due to a contract dispute with her management company. She was certified as a surgical technologist, but she reported that she was often turned down for jobs because of her adult film career. She retrained as a makeup artist, but suffered similar issues.

While Gauge was studying to become a surgical technician, an anesthesia student recognized her as a pornographic film actor, word spread among the staff and, when she was set to graduate, no one would sign off on her required hours. Later, while working at a hospital, her boss sexually harassed her and the hospital's complaints department did not believe her so she resigned.

== Awards and nominations ==
Year	Ceremony	Result	Award	Work
2003	XRCO Award			
2003	XRCO Award	Won	Best Threeway Sex Scene (with Aurora Snow & Jules Jordan)	Trained Teens
2005	KSEXradio Listener's Choice Award	Won	Favorite Porn Star (Not a KSEXradio Host)	—N/a
