= In the Days of Whore =

- DVD released by Extreme Associates
- Directed by: Thomas Zupko
- Written by: Thomas Zupko
- Produced by: Thomas Zupko
- Starring: Kristi Myst; Taylor St. Clair; Bridgette Kerkove; Monica; Suzanne Storm
- Edited by: Slain Wayne
- Music by: XXX Groovemaster
- Production company: Extreme Associates
- Distributed by: Extreme Associates
- Release date: October 17, 2000 (United States)
- Running time: 138 minutes
- Country: United States
- Language: English

In the Days of Whore is a 2000 American pornographic film written and directed by Thomas Zupko and produced and distributed by Extreme Associates. A dark psychological drama that is set in the 13th century, the film stars Kristi Myst, Taylor St. Clair, Bridgette Kerkove, Monica, and Suzanne Storm.

== Plot ==
In 1219 A.D., England is ruled by King Simon and his devoutly Christian wife, Queen Isabella. Simon's deranged son, despising his father, conspires with his wife, the princess, to trick Simon into having sex with a leprous woman, who spreads her disease to Simon. Simon had earlier decreed that all lepers, without exception, are to be stripped of their possessions and titles before being condemned to a leper colony on an island called Abaddon. Simon is tortured by his own knights and urinated upon by the princess before being banished to Abaddon.

Two years later, Simon, his body and mind having deteriorated due to his leprosy, has become a pessimistic nihilist who has taken over Abaddon with the help of a trio of marauding Vikings. The Vikings abduct women for themselves and Simon to rape, and after one captive is gangraped by the Vikings, including by being sodomized with a cigar, she attempts to garner mercy by consenting to having sex with Simon. Simon and another leper named Lazarus have sex with the woman, during which Lazarus begins to fall apart, with his penis breaking off in the woman's anus and his detached arm being used by Simon to anally penetrate the woman, who, now afflicted with leprosy, joins the rest of the outcasts on Abaddon. As he is dying, Lazarus confesses to Simon that he had once engaged in necrophilia with the body of a kindhearted French woman who had been gangraped and beaten to death by the Vikings. Simon euthanizes Lazarus.

A knight interrupts the prince as the prince is being fellated by a man to inform him that Simon is abducting maidens to turn into debauched lepers with the help of the Vikings. The prince has the knight executed for annoying him, having no sympathy for the "low class harlots" who are being kidnapped by Simon. Simon has the princess abducted and leaves her with lepers and the Vikings after telling her, "Do what you must, and you will find freedom." After the princess has sex with all of the Vikings and lepers, Simon has her fellate him before he decapitates her, with the princess's severed head being taken and used for oral sex by a leper as the distraught prince is comforted by Isabella.

A year later, Simon's sermon to a cult-like group of monks is interrupted when the Vikings bring him Isabella, who prostrates herself before her husband while declaring, "To this end, we all must come." Simon is unable to face Isabella and does nothing as she is sexually assaulted by the Vikings. Simon has Isabella taken down into the church's basement, where he and the Vikings gangrape her in a tub full of blood before having Isabella be gangraped by the monks, who spout Christian rhetoric as they take turns anally violating Isabella. After all of the monks ejaculate onto Isabella's face, one of them collects all of the semen on a crucifix and, in a mockery of absolution, feeds the sperm to Isabella. The monks all proceed to urinate on Isabella and the crucifix before Isabella fellates Simon. Simon's penis breaks off, spraying blood all over Isabella. Simon, in despair, slits Isabella's throat and then his own, with Simon's last dying act being to reach out to the dead Isabella.

== Cast ==
- Kristi Myst as Queen Isabella
- Taylor St. Clair as Princess
- Bridgette Kerkove as Captured Woman
- Monica as French Woman
- Suzanne Storm as Leprous Woman
- Brian Surewood as Viking
- Rod Fontana as Viking
- Mickey G. as Viking
- John Strong as Monk
- Tyce Bune as Lazarus
- Brandon Iron as Leper/Monk
- Mark Wood as Leper
- Dick Nasty as Monk
- Trevor Thompson as Monk
- Arnold Schwartzenpecker as Leper/Monk
- Valentino as Monk
- Gino Greco as Monk
- Mr. Pete as Leper
- Oliver as Leper
- Jay Stone as Prince
- Brick Majors as Monk
- Homeless Jimmy as Knight
- Jake Lawless as Knight
- Dynamite D as Knight
- Anthony Crane as King Simon

== Production ==
The script for In the Days of Whore was thirty-three pages long, and the film was shot on September 2–4, 2000. It was shot on betacam by Francois Clousot and Tom Byron and edited by Slain Wayne.

According to Thomas Zupko, Extreme Associates gave him total creative control over In the Days of Whore. The budget for the film was larger than that of any prior projects produced by Extreme Associates. When it came to directing the film, Zupko stated, "It's very easy to say 'I'm going to let the girl go with what she wants to do.' I think it has to be more, so if I have to be difficult with a performer, if I have to take them that little extra mile to a place where they may hate me, I'll do it." In response to allegations that In the Days of Whore would merely be an exercise in shock value, Zupko asserted, "It isn't about shock value, it's the whole story line. This microcosm for life with really intense sex going on." Zupko further compared the film to "Max Hardcore teaming up with Frederick Fellini" and stated, "So many people in porno aspire to greatness by boasting that their flicks are 'revolutionary' and 'cutting edge,' a marriage between adult and mainstream, but you can't get that in two or three days. You can only get that if you take your performers to their very limit and get every camera angle, every bit of dialogue, every fucking subtlety and nuance, and make sure your sex is of the hardest and nastiest variety, then take it to an editor who brings the same passion to the project as you."

The film's climax, in which actress Kristi Myst's character is gangraped twice in a row by two different groups of men while being dunked in a tub full of fake blood, took over seven hours to shoot, with Myst having commented, "There were times during the shoot when I seriously considered retirement-and that is not a joke." Costar Brandon Iron has alleged that after Myst did the first sex scene, she was informed that she would be doing a second one with even more men immediately afterward, even though she had not agreed to do so, Myst having "consented only to being pissed on." According to Iron, Myst only did the second sex scene after she had suffered a tearful breakdown during which she was taken aside and consoled for twenty minutes by Tom Byron.

Adult film director Skeeter Kerkove has claimed that his ex-wife, actress Bridgette Kerkove, had been offered $1,200 by Extreme Associates to appear in In the Days of Whore but was only paid $1,000. Kerkove has further alleged that Extreme Associates had contracted Bridgette to do only one sex scene in the film but instead had her perform in two, and as such Extreme Associates owed Bridgette an additional $1,000.

== Release ==
In the Days of Whore was released direct-to-video on October 17, 2000, as part of E-Days, a promotion in which Extreme Associates released one big-budget feature-length pornographic film every week of October.

== Reception ==
AVN gave In the Days of Whore a grade of 4/5 and deemed it an ambitious, audacious, and distinctive film that "stays burned in one's memory banks" while also calling it "a flawed, only partially successful production" that was marred by "long-winded metaphysical rantings, masturbatory-distracting gross-out images (lepers, rotting, bloody cocks, etc.) and sex that while brutally depraved (quasi-rape scenes essentially), frequently doesn't come to a full-on boil." Roger T. Pipe of RogReviews awarded In the Days of Whore a score of 8/10 and wrote, "From a creative standpoint, it's original, well thought out, technically solid and bound to shock pretty much everyone. From a jerk-off tape standpoint, there is too much violence, rape, blood and piss for my taste. So everyone watch it, judge for yourself, but pick up a Tom Byron movie to go along with it so you can cleanse your masturbatory palate with purely strokeable material." Neil B. of XXX Movie Review criticized the film's dialogue but otherwise praised it, declaring it a "masterpiece" and giving it a grade of 5/5 before writing, "This is a serious movie that stays true to the plot all the way through. The direction, music, make up, acting, editing, production and storyline are some of the best I've ever seen. The integrity of the story is such that you never need or want to use the fast forward."

Peter van Aarle of Cyberspace Adult Video Reviews, despite praising the film's sex scenes and production values, awarded it a score of just 6.00/10.00 (the lowest one possible) due to having been disgusted by elements like "the distorted ugly faces, decapitation, blood, guts and other horror movie stuff", concluding, "At least the sex is hot, the rest is NOT!" ViceList deemed In the Days of Whore an "enormous undertaking of a movie" and "the kind of porn you experience, not the kind you generally rub a quickie out with" but criticized the acting, plot, and "heavy-handed yet completely ridiculous metaphysical notions" before concluding, "The best thing I can say is that it makes simulated rape entertaining to more people because each sequence is packed with hilarious ranting barbarians!" Howard Hampton, author of Born in Flames: Termite Dreams, Dialectical Fairy Tales, and Pop Apocalypse, was dismissive of the film, calling it "ineptly artsy twaddle" and a "Catholic-schoolboy barf-fest replete with grunting Vikings, horny lepers, and a maiden being raped every twenty minutes."

In the Days of Whore placed third in the Adam Film World ranking of the top pornographic films of 2000 and took ninth place in the High Society list Top Ten Videos of the Year (2000).

=== Awards ===
In the Days of Whore won Best Anal Sex Scene (Video) and Most Outrageous Sex Scene at the 18th AVN Awards. The film also won Best Group Sex Scene at the 2001 XRCO Awards and the Ninfa Awards for Best Anal Scene and Best 100% Sex Film at the 2001 Barcelona International Erotic Film Festival, which it was entered in under the name Orgías Vikingas.

== Prequel ==
In August 2006, Thomas Zupko announced that he and Extreme Associates had begun work on a prequel to In the Days of Whore titled Before the Days of Whore. Zupko spent a month writing the prequel's characterization-heavy script, which he declared was "far more intense" than In the Days of Whore, and stated that production on the film was scheduled for September with a cast that would include Tom Byron (playing a king) and Paris Gables. The film, which went unproduced, would have been released in a two-disc DVD set with a remastered and recut version of In the Days of Whore.
