= Michael Stefano =

American pornographic actor and director

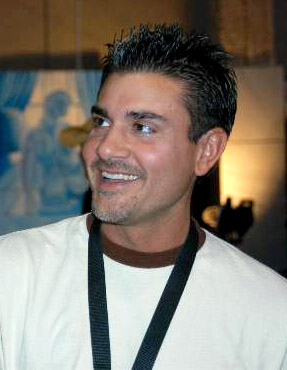
- Stefano at the 2005 AVN Adult Entertainment Expo
- Born: August 29, 1969 (age 57); Hartford, Connecticut, U.S.
- Other names: Luciano, Mike Long
- Height: 5 ft 10 in (1.78 m)

Michael Stefano (born Michael Vito Menta; August 29, 1969) is an American pornographic actor and director. He appeared in over 1,000 films and, by his own estimate, performed in over 3,000 scenes.

An injury forced Stefano to take a break from performing and in the interim he learned how to edit. He began his directing career with Extreme Associates in the mid-1990s under the name Luciano. In 2001, he started directing for Red Light District Video. In 2003, Platinum X Pictures was launched by Stefano and Jewel De'Nyle (whom he would later marry), bankrolled by Red Light. Platinum X featured directors Manuel Ferrara, Brandon Iron, and Steve Holmes, and produced very similar content to Red Light. Around the same time, Red Light began distributing the films of Amateur District and Candy Shop, a studio headed by Stefano specializing in interracial content.

In 2010, Stefano announced his retirement from pornography, but in 2011 he announced his return to pornography full-time. In 2012, he again retired from the Adult Industry, but returned in 2013. He is still active in the industry as of 2025.

== Awards ==
- 1999 XRCO Award – Unsung Swordsman as Luciano
- 1999 XRCO Award – Best Group Scene as Luciano - Asswoman In Wonderland
- 2004 AVN Award – Male Performer of the Year
- 2005 Adam Film World Guide Award - Male Performer of the Year
- 2009 AVN Award – Best Threeway Sex Scene – The Jenny Hendrix Anal Experience
- 2010 AVN Hall of Fame inductee
- 2010 Urban X Hall of Fame inductee
- 2011 AVN Award – Best Group Sex Scene – Buttwoman vs. Slutwoman
