= Extreme Associates =

Pornographic film production company

- Type: Private
- Industry: Pornography
- Founded: 1997; 29 years ago
- Headquarters: 11133 Vanowen, Suite D, North Hollywood, California, United States
- Key people: Rob Zicari (founder, owner, director); Janet Romano (owner, director); Tom Byron (owner, director)
- Products: Pornographic films

Extreme Associates, formerly known as Extreme and Extreme 2.0, is an independent pornographic film production company, featuring a catalog of DVD titles and Internet content. It is owned by Rob Zicari ("Rob Black") and his former wife Janet Romano ("Lizzy Borden"). The studio's material is controversial, with its films often featuring erotic humiliation and rough sex. Extreme has faced legal charges of obscenity in the U.S. It is associated with another adult film company, Evolution Erotica.

== History ==
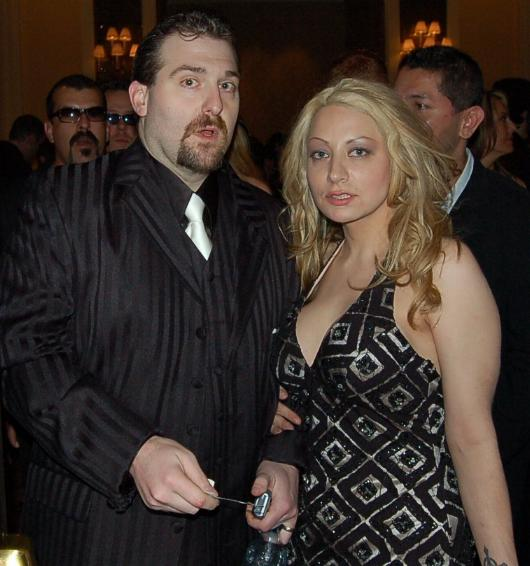
Rob Zicari and Janet Romano.

Extreme Associates evolved from Rob Zicari's former company, Extreme Video. It became known as Extreme Associates in 1997 when Zicari, Tom Byron and Van Damage broke away from Patrick Collins' Elegant Angel and formed their own company. Tom Byron and Van Damage have since left the company. Janet Romano started to work for Zicari in 1998, first as an actress and then as a director.

In 2003, it was indicted by the U.S. federal government on obscenity charges. The company is known for being controversial, as it has engaged in public relations wars with Vivid Video, Patrick Collins and his company Elegant Angel, Paul Fishbein and his publication Adult Video News, and Larry Flynt.

Extreme Associates has been featured on America's Most Wanted, Nightline with Ted Koppel and The Daily Show with Jon Stewart, and also in publications such as Time and Details. The company is the subject of the documentaries: PBS Frontline: American Porn (2002) and The Porn King vs. The President, and co-owner Lizzy Borden recently stated that there are more documentaries about the company in the process of being filmed.

Extreme Associates operated a professional wrestling promotion called Xtreme Pro Wrestling (XPW) from 1999 to 2003.

In March 2006 Extreme became the exclusive U.S. distributor for Shots Video Netherlands. The Dutch company is responsible for series like Men's Lounge, Bi Sex, Clinic Sex and Deep Throat Anal. Shots had been the exclusive European distributor for Extreme Associates since 2004.

In April 2006, Extreme films were added to AdultRental.com's video on demand service.

Starting in May 2006, the studio's content could be downloaded to the iPod and PSP.

In February 2007, Extreme signed a deal to be the exclusive distributor of all-black studio Baller Nation's films.

In September 2007, the company announced it would be halting DVD sales, and would be distributing content exclusively through its video on demand service, ExtremeVOD.com, which was launched in February 2006. The decision was taken due to the general downturn in porn DVD sales, and the refusal of some retailers to stock the studio's films.

Extreme posts approximately one hour's worth of free content on numerous "porn tube" websites every month, in the form of clips lasting just a few minutes. Zicari thinks the various 'Porn 2.0' user-generated content sites are useful for spreading brand awareness, even if it is difficult to measure how much this increases sales.

== Obscenity prosecution ==
The filming of Lizzy Borden's movie Forced Entry, which included several simulated rapes, was covered in the PBS Frontline documentary American Porn which aired on February 7, 2002; the makers of the documentary were repulsed and walked off the set. Zicari was interviewed in the documentary; he defended the company's content and challenged Attorney General John Ashcroft to take action against him. Zicari stated in an interview for the program, "We've got tons of stuff they technically could arrest us for. I'm not out there saying I want to be the test case. But I will be the test case. I would welcome that. I would welcome the publicity. I would welcome everything, to make a point in, I guess, our society". These scenes possibly led to the subsequent undercover operation by federal authorities.

On April 8, 2003, the premises of Extreme Associates were raided by federal agents, and five videos were seized. The United States Postal Inspection Service and the Pornography Unit of the Los Angeles Police Department's Organized Crime and Vice Division had conducted the investigation leading to the indictment. On September 5, 2002, a U.S. postal inspector had joined the Extreme website. Postal inspectors then viewed clips on the site and ordered three videotapes which were sent to a postal agent in Pittsburgh. On August 6, 2003, Black, Borden and the company were indicted by a federal grand jury in Pittsburgh on ten counts of the production and distribution by mail and the Internet of obscene pornographic materials. Zicari and Romano faced a maximum total sentence of 50 years in prison, a fine of $2,500,000, or both. Extreme Associates, Inc. faced a maximum total sentence of a term of probation of 50 years and a fine of $5,000,000. The prosecution also sought forfeiture of the films charged in the indictment, all gross profits from the distribution of the films, and all property used to facilitate the alleged crimes, including the domain name extremeassociates.com. At the time, it was the first major federal obscenity prosecution in ten years.

On March 11, 2009, Extreme Associates and its owners pleaded guilty to the reinstated obscenity charges to avoid trial, effectively shutting down the company. Extreme Associates also apparently took its website down concurrent with the plea.

== Films ==
=== Nature of content ===
Extreme Associates bills itself as having the hardest hardcore pornography on the Internet. The studio's content has been described as "extremely violent", "shocking", "slasher porn" and "patently offensive". In an interview with Salon.com Borden said of Extreme's content, "It's disgusting but I like to watch it because it's shocking". Borden and Zicari compare their films to slasher films and some reality television, which people watch in order to be shocked. Talking to ABC News about his films, Zicari said, "You might not like what you had just seen. It might have disturbed you, it might have repulsed you, it might have given you all sorts of emotions. But are you going to limit and be that person that has the right to say 200 million other citizens cannot watch that because you don't like it?"

=== Slap Happy ===
Slap Happy is a rough sex series, created by Brandon Iron and distributed by EA. The videos were directed by either Iron or Coffee Ron in a gonzo style and showcases male dominance with female submission. Each scene features at least one man with a woman who performs fellatio. He holds her head stationary while continually slapping and verbally abusing her as she gets irrumated by him. In many instances, the girl retches or throws up as a result of being gagged by a penis. Iron initially offered the series to 34 companies before Black agreed to distribute it.

== Actresses ==
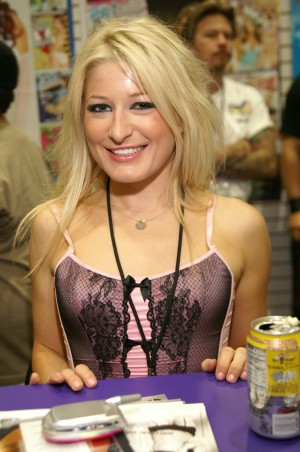
Paris Gables.

Actresses who have worked for Extreme Associates include Alana Evans, Alexandra Nice, Amber Lynn, Anastasia Blue, Ashlyn Gere, Bridget the Midget, Heather Gables, Iroc, Jasmin St. Claire, Jessica Darlin, Jewel De'Nyle, Juanita Chong, Kendra Jade, Kristi Myst, Lizzy Borden (who is also a producer and director), Monique DeMoan, Nikita Denise, Stryc-9, Tiffany Mynx, and Veronica Caine (formerly Barrett Moore). Pro wrestler Nicole Bass did some non-sex bondage videos for Extreme in 2000.

Ashlyn Gere performed in several films after making a comeback from retirement. She appeared in titles including House of Whores and the Extremely Yours: Ashlyn Gere compilation.

Gia Paloma had a contract with the studio until she left in May 2006. She was formerly married to EA director Coffee Ron. Kristi Myst also used to be an EA contract girl. Paris Gables is currently the company's main contract star, and has also directed. Gables initially went under contract in January 2005. By February 2006 she had appeared in almost a dozen films, and agreed to a one-year contract extension.

== Directors ==
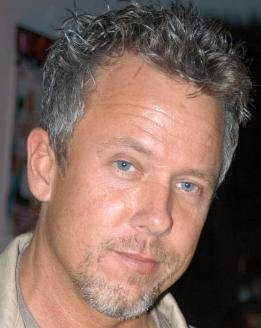
Tom Byron.

Extreme's current directors are Rob Black, Lizzy Borden, Shane Bugbee, Mark Zane (also known as Alias), Ivan E. Rection, Chris Justice (also known as Chris Evans), Coffee Ron and Thomas Zupko. Extreme's former directors include Matt Zane, Ashlyn Gere, David Luger, Derek Newblood, Gene Ross, Jane Waters, Luis Cypher (also known as Bobby Darlin), Luciano (Michael Stefano), Scott Snot, Slain Wayne (Eric Brummer), Smiley Johnson, Tiffany Mynx, Tom Byron, Brandon Iron and Van Damage.

Michael Stefano began his directing career with Extreme Associates in the mid-1990s under the name Luciano, before leaving to direct for Red Light District Video and other studios.

Thomas Zupko initially directed for the company from 2000 until 2003. His debut film was In the Days of Whore. After leaving, he worked for Elegant Angel, Sin City and Hustler Video, before returning to Extreme as a contract director in May 2006. The first film of his second stint was entitled Lisa Ann Defiled. Zupko won a Ninfa Special Jury Award in 2006.

Church of Satan member Shane Bugbee directs the satanism-themed Club Satan series. The first title, Club Satan: The Witches Sabbath was released in early 2007. Several crew-members and performers walked off the set of the film when an actor was asked to ejaculate upon and then smash a model of Jesus Christ's head. Actor Rick Masters said that Bugbee had "gone too far".

== Awards ==
The following is a selection of major awards EA has won:

- 1998 XRCO Award - 'Best Gonzo Series' for Whack Attack
- 1999 AVN Award - 'Best Gonzo Release' for Whack Attack 2
- 2000 AVN Award - 'Best Anal Sex Scene - Video' for Anastasia Blue and Lexington Steele in Whack Attack 6
- 2000 XRCO Award - 'Best Group Sex Scene' for Kristi Myst's gangbang in In the Days of Whore
- 2001 AVN Award - 'Best Vignette Release' for Terrors from the Clit 2
- 2001 AVN award - 'Most Outrageous Sex Scene' for Tyce Bune and Bridgette Kerkove in In the Days of Whore
- 2001 AVN Award - 'Best Anal Sex Scene - Video' for Kristi Myst in In the Days of Whore
- 2006 AVN award - 'Reuben Sturman Award' for Rob and Janet Zicari.
