= Kristi Myst =

American pornographic actress (born 1973)

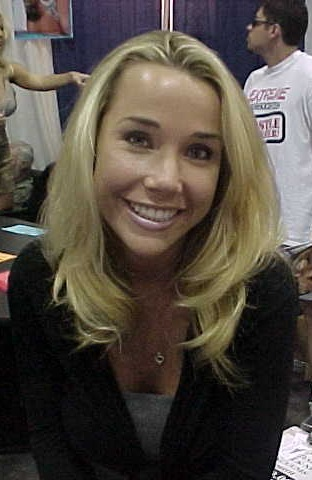
- Kristi Myst at the AVN Adult Entertainment Expo in 1999
- Born: December 25, 1973 (age 52); Solvang, California, U.S.
- Other names: Buffy the Vampire Layer; Kristy Must; Christy Myst; Kristy Myst; Krysti Myst; Pamela Sanderson; White Trash
- Occupations: Pornographic actress; professional wrestler
- Height: 5 ft 4 in (1.63 m)

Krysti Myst (born December 25, 1973) is an American former pornographic actress and former professional wrestler.

== Porn career ==
Myst was working as a dental assistant in Los Angeles when she decided to get into the adult entertainment industry. She did a cover shoot for Hustler magazine and layouts for High Society and New Rave before making the jump into adult films in 1995.

Myst's best known films include the Buffy the Vampire Layer series of horror parodies. Buffy Down Under (1996), from that series, produced by David Haines, was the highest selling Australian produced adult film of all time.

She won the 2001 AVN Award for Best Anal Sex Scene – Video for a gang bang scene with urophagia in the film In the Days of Whore (Extreme Associates). Myst had broken down on the set and wanted to walk off the film and quit the business rather than complete her scene.

== Pro wrestling career ==
She made a move into professional wrestling by joining Xtreme Pro Wrestling in 1999 and feuded with Lizzy Borden. She was present for an incident which took place at Extreme Championship Wrestling's HeatWave 2000 PPV. Several XPW wrestlers attended the ECW event and an altercation ensued between XPW and ECW performers. Much of ECW's locker room ran to ringside to escort their XPW counterparts out of the building.

Myst went on to become part of the Wrestling Vixxxens website with Tammy Lynn Sytch and Missy Hyatt in 2001.

== Retirement ==
In January 2001, she left the industry to raise a child. In a 2005 interview, she described herself as a "full time mom," and a fan of X-Men comic books.

== Awards and nominations ==
| Year | Ceremony | Result | Award | Work |
|---|---|---|---|---|
| 2000 | AVN Award | Nominated | Best Anal Sex Scene, Video (with Evan Stone) | L.A. 399 |
| 2000 | XRCO Award | Nominated | Best Anal or D.P. Scene (with Tom Byron) | Whack Attack 6 |
| 2001 | AVN Award | Nominated | Female Performer of the Year | —N/a |
| 2001 | AVN Award | Won | Best Anal Sex Scene - Video | In the Days of Whore |
| 2001 | AVN Award | Nominated | Most Outrageous Sex Scene | Cocktails |
| 2001 | XRCO Award | Nominated | Female Performer of the Year | —N/a |
| 2001 | XRCO Award | Nominated | Actress (Single Performance) | In the Days of Whore |
| 2001 | XRCO Award | Nominated | Anal Queen | —N/a |
| 2001 | XRCO Award | Won | Best Group Sex Scene | In the Days of Whore |
| 2001 | FICEB Ninfa Award | Won | Best Anal Scene | ORGÍAS VIKINGAS - final scene |
