= 24th AVN Awards =

US adult industry award ceremony in 2007

- Date: January 13, 2007
- Site: Mandalay Bay Events Center at Paradise, Nevada, U.S.A.
- Hosted by: Jessica Drake; Jim Norton
- Preshow hosts: Jesse Jane; Kirsten Price; Daisy Marie
- Produced by: Gary Miller
- Directed by: Gary Miller

Highlights
- Best Picture: Manhunters (Best Film)
- Most awards: Corruption (7); Manhunters (7)
- Most nominations: Manhunters (24)

Television coverage
- Network: Playboy TV
- Duration: 2 hours, 10 minutes

The 24th AVN Awards ceremony, presented by Adult Video News (AVN), honored the best pornographic films of 2006 and took place January 13, 2007 at the Mandalay Bay Events Center in Paradise, Nevada. During the ceremony, Adult Video News presented AVN Awards (commonly referred to as the Oscars of porn) in 119 categories released during the eligibility period, Oct. 1, 2005 to Sept. 30, 2006. The ceremony, televised in the United States by Playboy TV, was produced and directed by Gary Miller. Adult film star Jessica Drake hosted for the first time, with comedian Jim Norton, who also co-hosted in 2004.

Manhunters won seven awards, including Best Film and Best Director for Brad Armstrong, as did Corruption, which won Best Video Feature and Best Director—Video for Eli Cross. Other winners included Fuck and Sacred Sin each with five and Fashionistas Safado: The Challenge with three.

== Winners and nominees ==
The nominees were announced Nov. 22, 2006 by AVN.

The winners were announced during the awards ceremony on January 13, 2007. The coveted Female Performer of the Year and Best New Starlet awards went to Hillary Scott and Naomi respectively while Tommy Gunn won Male Performer of the Year.

=== Major awards ===
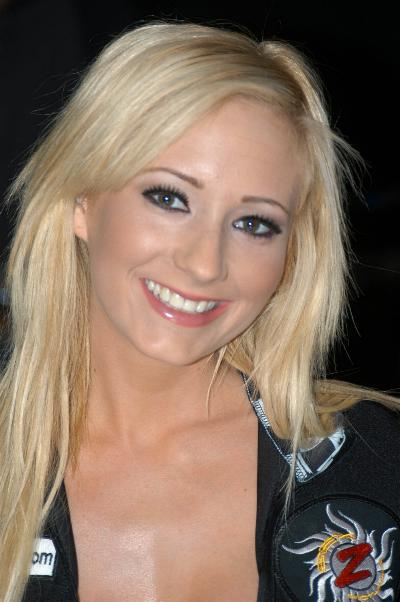
Hillary Scott, Female Performer of the Year and Best Actress – Video winner

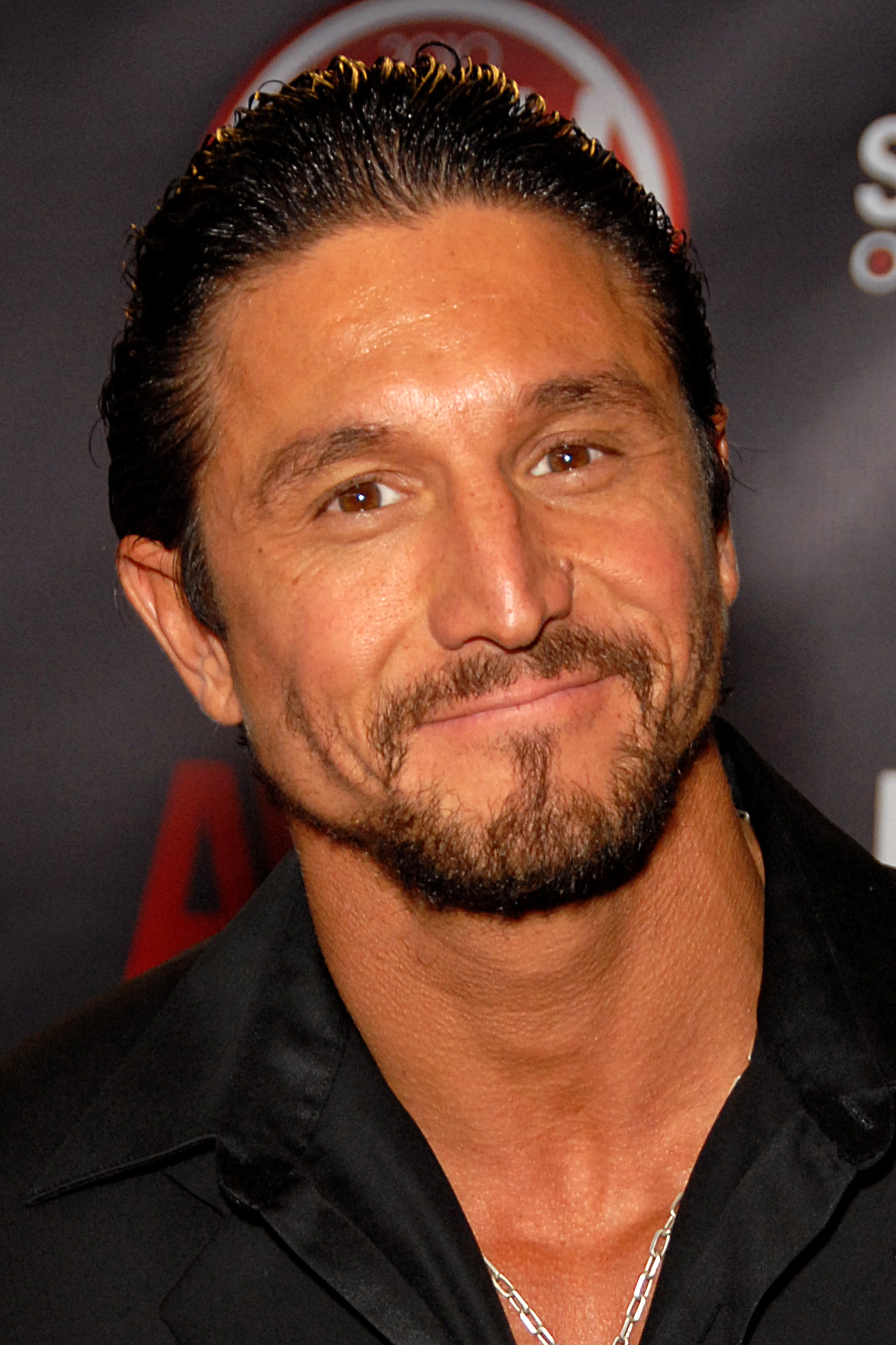
Tommy Gunn, Male Performer of the Year winner

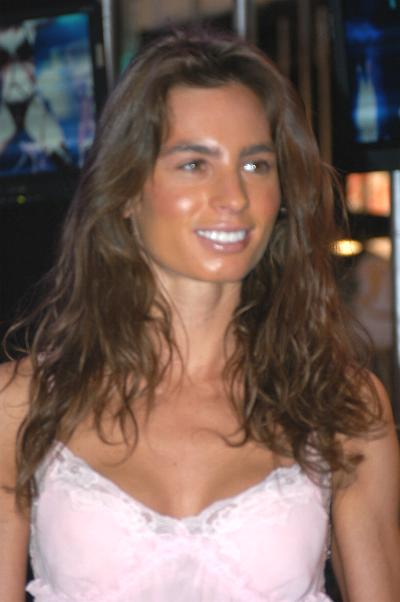
Naomi, Best New Starlet winner

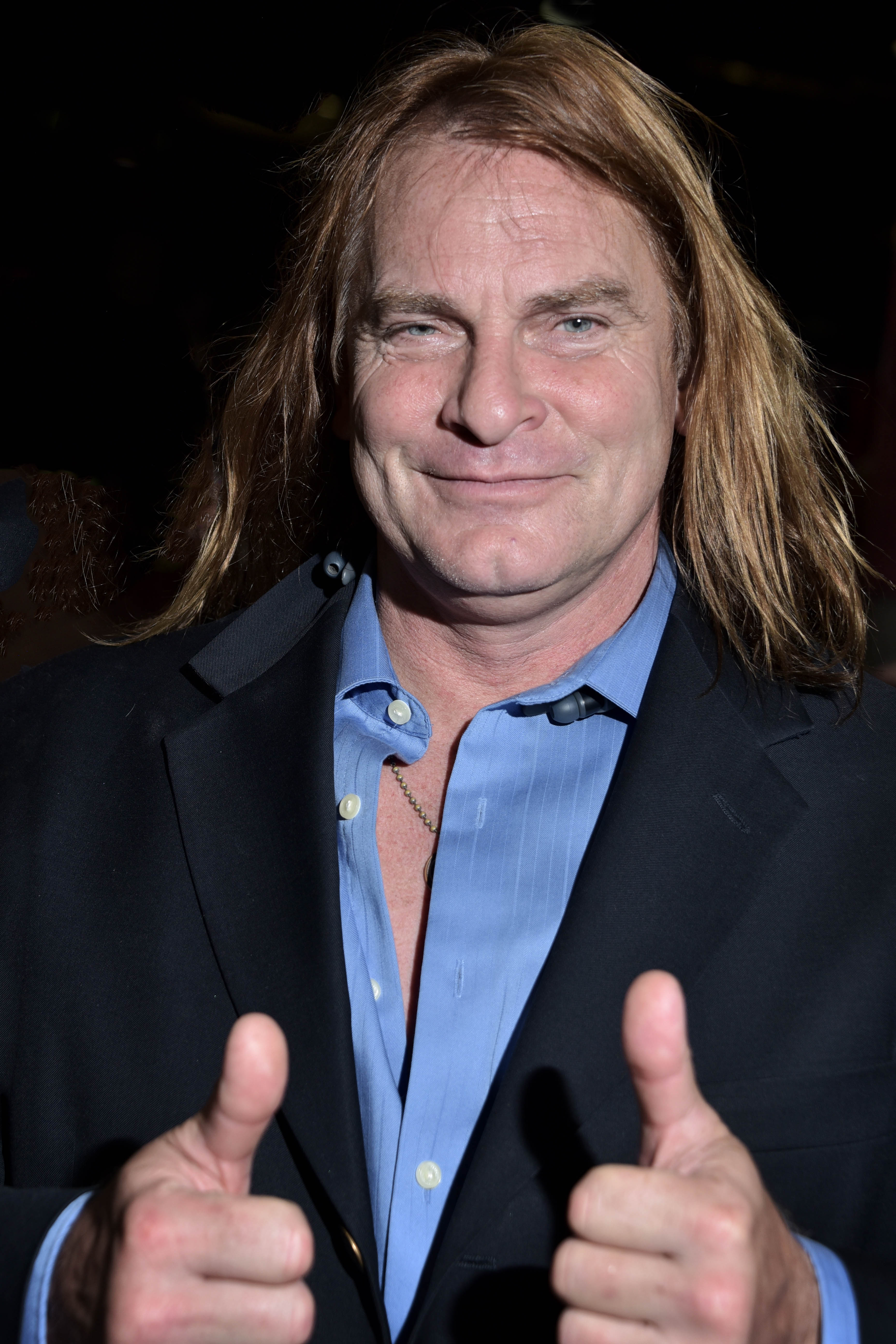
Evan Stone, Best Actor – Video winner

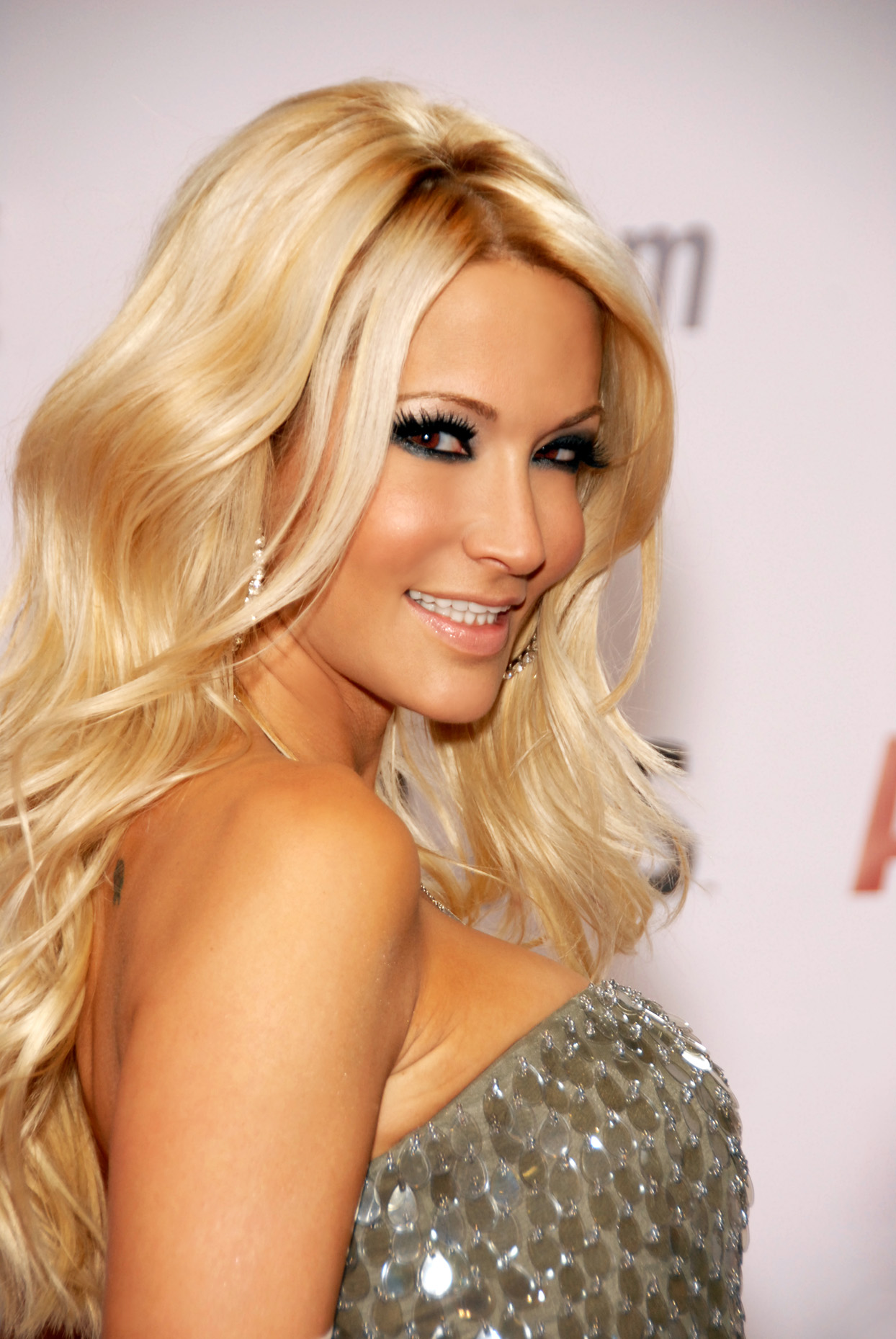
Jessica Drake, Best Actress – Film winner

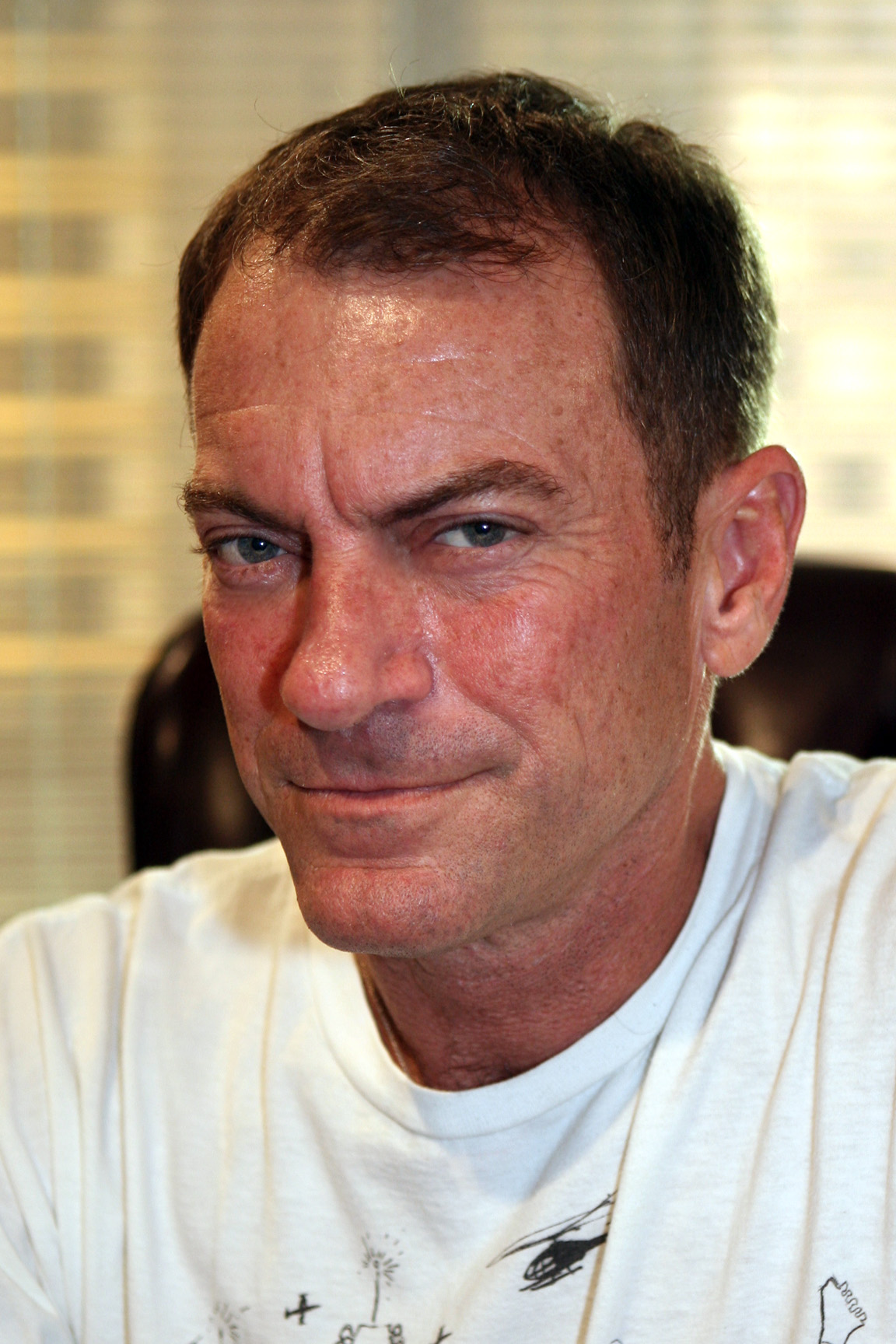
Randy Spears, Best Actor – Film winner

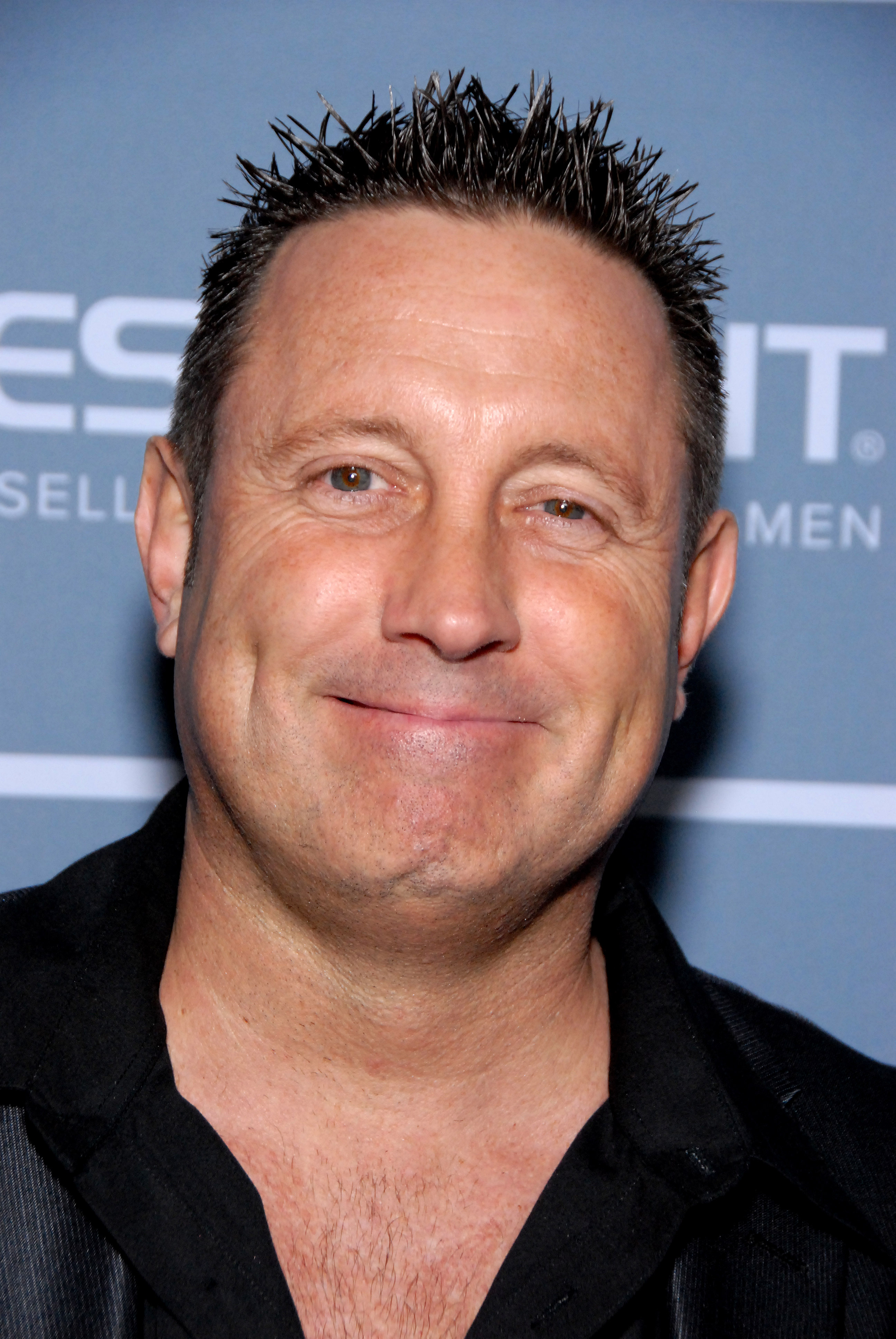
Brad Armstrong, Best Director – Film and Best Screenplay – Film winner

Winners are listed first, highlighted in boldface, and indicated with a double dagger (‡).

Best Video Feature	Best Film
**Corruption**‡; 1000 Words; Aphrodisiac; Briana Loves Rocco; Curse Eternal; Fashionistas Safado: The Challenge; Grub Girl; The New Neighbors; Sacred Sin; Sex Pix; The Sex Whisperer; Sodom 2; Tailgunners; The Visitors; Wonderland	**Manhunters**‡; Emperor; Fade to Black 2; Fuck; Janine's Been Black Maled; Jenna's Provocateur; To Die For; Valentina
Female Performer of the Year	Male Performer of the Year
**Hillary Scott**‡; Belladonna; Jasmine Byrne; Jenna Haze; Roxy Jezel; Kimberly Kane; Kinzie Kenner; Tory Lane; Sunny Lane; Shy Love; Marie Luv; Sativa Rose; Flower Tucci	**Tommy Gunn**‡; Mark Ashley; Marco Banderas; James Deen; Erik Everhard; Manuel Ferrara; Kurt Lockwood; Scott Nails; Justin Slayer; Lexington Steele; Michael Stefano; Evan Stone; John Strong; Tony T.
Best New Starlet	Best Tease Performance
**Naomi**‡; Alektra Blue; Sasha Grey; Gianna Lynn; Candy Manson; Riley Mason; Michelle Maylene; Stefani Morgan; Naomi See; Jenna Presley; Kirsten Price; Amy Ried; Ava Rose; Mia Rose; Charlotte Stokely	**Amy Ried – My Plaything: Amy Ried**‡; Jasmine Byrne – Jack's Playground 31; Roxy DeVille – Blacklight Beauty; Penny Flame – Short & Sleazy; Kinzie Kenner – Big Wet Asses 7; Tory Lane – Illegal Ass; McKenzie Lee – My Plaything McKenzie Lee; Smokin' Mary Jane – The Rebelle Rousers; Riley Mason – Hard Candy; Naomi – Naomi There's Only One; Celeste Star – Intoxicated; Jennifer Steele – Butt Blassted 3; Valentina Vaughn – Valentina; Valentina Velasquez – Crack Her Jack 5; Ariel X – Sex Gallery
Best Actress – Video	Best Actor – Video
**Hillary Scott – Corruption**‡; Joanna Angel – Joanna's Angels 2; Belladonna – Fashionistas Safado: The Challenge; Violet Blue – Wonderland; Stormy Daniels – Taken; Jessica Drake – Curse Eternal; Kimberly Kane – The Visitors; Sunny Lane – Sex Pix; Mercedez – Illicit; Missy Monroe – The Da Vinci Load; Austyn Moore – Tailgunners; Kirsten Price – Just Like That; Linda Roberts – The New Neighbors; Britney Skye – Grub Girl; Heather Vuur – Sacred Sin	**Evan Stone – Sex Pix**‡; Brad Armstrong – Women on Top; Van Damage – Intimate Strangers; Manuel Ferrara – Bustful of Dollars; Mike Horner – The New Neighbors; Spyder Jonez – Desperate; Kurt Lockwood – Illicit; Nick Manning – Sacred Sin; Eric Masterson – 3 Wishes; Tommy Pistol – Joanna's Angels 2: Alt Throttle; Reda Semlahen – Sex City; Rocco Siffredi – Fashionistas Safado: The Challenge; Dick Smothers Jr. – Get Luckier!; Randy Spears – Just Like That; Steven St. Croix – Wonderland
Best Actress – Film	Best Actor – Film
**Jessica Drake – Manhunters**‡; Monique Alexander – To Die For; Janine – Emperor; Austin Kincaid – To Die For; Ava Vincent – Fade to Black 2	**Randy Spears – Manhunters**‡; Buck Adams – Uninhibited; Tommy Gunn – To Die For; Julian – Janine's Been Black Maled; Rocco Siffredi – Emperor
Best Supporting Actress – Video	Best Director – Video
**Katsumi – Fashionistas Safado: The Challenge**‡; Alana Evans – Corruption; Nicki Hunter – Wild Things on the Run 3; Kylie Ireland – Corruption; Jassie – Sacred Sin; Kat – Caliente; Tory Lane – The Fling; Kaylani Lei – Curse Eternal; Carmen Luvana – Tailgunners; Stefani Morgan – Illicit; Katie Morgan – Get Luckier!; Haley Paige – The New Neighbors; Texas Presley – Orgazmika; Keri Sable – The Visitors; Aurora Snow – Rumour Had 'Em	**Eli Cross – Corruption**‡; Joanna Angel – Joanna's Angels 2 Alt Throttle; Brad Armstrong – Curse Eternal; James Avalon – Sex Pix; Skye Blue – Airgazmic: The Capture; Frank Castle – The New Neighbors; DCypher – Wonderland; Stormy Daniels – Gossip; Michael Ninn – Sacred Sin; Nick Orleans – Tailgunners; Jim Powers – Stiffer Competition; Michael Raven – The Visitors; John Stagliano – Fashionistas Safado: The Challenge; David Stanley – 1000 Words; Jerome Tanner – Aphrodisiac
Best All-Sex Release	Best Gonzo Release
**Blacklight Beauty**‡; **Neu Wave Hookers** (tie)‡; 7 Deadly Sins; Addicted Again; Between the Sheets; Flesh Gallery; Game; Industry; Island Fever 4; Jesse Jane: Sexual Freak; McKenzie Made; Naked and Famous; Porno Revolution; Teagan's Juice; Teradise Island	**Chemistry**‡; Attention Whores 6; Barely Legal Corrupted 6; Brianna Love Oversexed; Butt Pirates of the Caribbean; Control; Devinn Lane's Swingers; The Gauntlet; Hellcats 10; Jack's Teen America 9; Naomi...There's Only One; Rockhard: Making the Video; Service Animals 23; Teens for Cash 7; The Voyeur 31
Best Ethnic-Themed Series – Latin	Best All-Girl Sex Scene – Video
**Mami Culo Grande**‡; Big Latin Wet Butts; Chica Boom; Mamacitas; Mexicunts; My Latin Cream Pie; Pretty Little Latinas; Young Tight Latinas	**Teagan Presley, Jesse Jane, Jana Cova, Sophia Santi – Island Fever 4**‡; Kapri Styles, Ariel Alexis – Addicted to Black Crack; Sarah Blake, Justine Joli – All About Keri; Hillary Scott, Sandra Romain, Nicki Hunter – Anal Princess Diaries 2; Sammie Rhodes, Jamie Huxley – Artcore 4; Tory Lane, Roxy Jezel – Belladonna: No Warning 2; Belladonna, Chloe Dior – Belladonna: No Warning; Kylie Ireland, Hillary Scott – Corruption; Jesse Capelli, Natalia Cruz – Deep in Style; Brea Bennett, Veronica Snow – Girls in White; Brianna Love, Sativa Rose – Girls Love Girls; Kelly Kline, Roxy Jezel – Girls Sodomizing Girls; Sammie Rhodes, Shyla Stylez, Jenaveve – Girlvana 2; Jenna Haze, Tory Lane – Jenna Haze Dark Side; Sunny Leone, Lanny Barbie, Lexie Marie, Amy Reid, Charmane Star – Virtual Vivid Girl Sunny Leone
Best Sex Scene Coupling – Video	Best Sex Scene Coupling – Film
**Tiffany Mynx, Manuel Ferrara – Slave Dolls 2**‡; Daisy Marie, Evan Stone – Aphrodisiac; Allie Sin, Alec Knight – Blacklight Beauty; Katie Morgan, Randy Spears – Clique; Ice LaFox, Tyler Knight – Darker Side of Sin 3; Lela Star, Manuel Ferrara – Erotica XXX 12; Teagan Presley, Evan Stone – Island Fever 4; Jenna Haze, Mario Cassini – Jenna Haze Dark Side; Pixie Pearl, Tommy Pistol – Joanna's Angels 2: Alt Throttle; Naomi, James Deen – Naomi...There's Only One; Amy Ried, Michael Stefano – New Whores on the Block; Sierra Sin, Sean Michaels – Racial Tension; Jassie, Jean Val Jean – Sacred Sin; Taylor Rain, Evan Stone – Sensual Image; Kimberly Kane, Evan Stone – The Visitors	**Janine, Manuel Ferrara – Emperor**‡; Janine, Rocco Siffredi – Emperor; Jessica Drake, Eric Masterson – Fuck; Eve Lawrence, Chris Cannon – Janine's Been Black Maled; Janine, Evan Stone – Janine's Been Black Maled; Ashton Moore, Manuel Ferrara – Jenna's Provocateur; Krystal Steal, Barrett Blade – Jenna's Provocateur; Carmen Hart, Myles Camack – Manhunters; Devon Michaels, Lee Stone – Manhunters; Liza Harper, Kurt Lockwood – To Die For; Monique Alexander, Tommy Gunn – To Die For; Angie Savage, Devon Savage – Valentina
Best Anal Sex Scene – Video	Best Oral Sex Scene – Video
**Amy Ried, Vince Vouyer – Breakin’ ‘Em In 9**‡; Genesis Skye, Michael Stefano, John Strong – Anal Violation; Flower Tucci, Justin Slayer – Big Booty White Girls 4; Christie Lee, Sean Michaels – Elastic Assholes 4; Sativa Rose, Richard Kline – Hellcats 11; Hillary Scott, Jean Val Jean – Jessica's Jet Set; Joanna Angel, James Deen – Lewd Conduct 27; Tyla Wynn, Kelly Wells, John Strong – Lick Her Ass Off My Dick; Kinzie Kenner, Randy Spears – Lil' Red Riding Slut; Sandra Romain, Tommy Gunn – Porno Revolution; Mia Rose, Manuel Ferrara – Slutty and Sluttier; Holly Wellin, Tom Byron – T for Tushy; Tory Lane, Mark Davis – Up'R Class 4; Heather Gables, Mandingo – Weapons of Ass Destruction 4; Audrey Hollander, Otto Bauer, Alex Sanders – X-Treme Violation	**Jenna Haze, Scott Lyons, Arnold Schwartzenpecker, Johnny Fender, Trent Sulari, Donny Schlong – Jenna Haze Dark Side**‡; Taylor Hayes, Mark Davis – Ass Hunt; Allie Sin, Alec Knight – Blacklight Beauty; Gianna Michaels, Mandingo – Boob Bangers 2; Dana DeArmond, Jack Lawrence – Chemistry; Naomi, Chris Charming – Control 3; Hillary Scott, James Deen – Corruption; Katsumi, Nacho Vidal – Fashionistas Safado: The Challenge; Tory Lane, Jenner – Gag Factor 21; Leah Luv, Mick Blue – Hard Candy; Alana Evans, Billy Glide – Mind Blowers 3; Kimberly Kane, Lexi Love, gloryhole boys – Naked and Famous; Sasha Grey, four Mopes – Oral Supremecy; Lacie Heart, Anton Michael – Roughed Up; Sandra Romain, Jonni Darkko – Suck It Dry 2

=== Additional Award Winners ===
These awards were announced in a pre-recorded winners-only segment during the event but were not part of the televised awards show. Trophies were mailed to the recipients later:

**DIRECTOR AWARDS**

- Best Director - Film: Brad Armstrong, Manhunters
- Best Director - Foreign Release: Pierre Woodman, Sex City
- Best Director - Non-Feature: JacktheZipper, Blacklight Beauty
- Director of the Year (Body of Work): Jim Powers

**MARKETING AWARDS**

- Best New Video Production Company: Jules Jordan Video
- Best Online Marketing Campaign – Company: Digital Playground, DigitalPlayground.com
- Best Online Marketing Campaign – Individual Project: Sacred Sin, Ninn Worx
- Best Overall Marketing Campaign – Company Image: ClubJenna
- Best Overall Marketing Campaign – Individual Project: Sacred Sin, NinnWorx
- Best Packaging: Tailgunners, Adam & Eve
- Best Renting Title of the Year: Pirates
- Best Retail Website – Rentals: WantedList.com
- Best Retail Website – Sales: AdultDVDEmpire.com
- Best Selling Title of the Year: Pirates

**PERFORMER AWARDS**

- Best Male Newcomer: Tommy Pistol
- Best Non-Sex Performance: Bryn Pryor, Corruption
- Best Supporting Actor – Film: Kurt Lockwood, To Die For
- Best Supporting Actor – Video: Manuel Ferrara, She Bangs
- Best Supporting Actress – Film: Kirsten Price, Manhunters
- Contract Star of the Year: Stormy Daniels
- Crossover Star of the Year: Jenna Jameson
- Female Foreign Performer of the Year: Katsumi
- Male Foreign Performer of the Year: Jean Val Jean
- Transsexual Performer of the Year: Buck Angel
- Underrated Starlet of the Year (Unrecognized Excellence): Mika Tan

**PRODUCTION AWARDS**

- Best All-Girl Release: Belladonna: No Warning
- Best All-Girl Series: Erocktavision
- Best Alternative Release: Real Adventures 84
- Best Amateur Release: Bang Bus 9
- Best Amateur Series: Homegrown Video
- Best Anal-Themed Release: Weapons of Ass Destruction 4
- Best Anal-Themed Series: Big Wet Asses
- Best Animated Release: Pornomation 2
- Best Classic DVD: Neon Nights
- Best Continuing Video Series: Dementia
- Best Ethnic-Themed Release – Asian: Asia Noir 5: A Lust Supreme
- Best Ethnic-Themed Release – Black: Tales from the Darkside
- Best Ethnic-Themed Release – Latin: Brazilian Island 2
- Best Ethnic-Themed Series – Asian: Sakura Tales
- Best Ethnic-Themed Series – Black: Phatty Girls
- Best Foreign All-Sex Release: Euro Domination
- Best Foreign All-Sex Series: Obsession
- Best Foreign Feature: Porn Wars: Episode 1
- Best Gonzo Series: College Invasion
- Best Hard-Edged All-Sex Release: Slave Dolls 2
- Best High-Definition Production: Fashionistas Safado: The Challenge
- Best Interactive DVD: Virtual Vivid Girl Sunny Leone
- Best Interracial Release: Racial Tension
- Best Interracial Series: My Hot Wife Is Fucking Blackzilla
- Best Mainstream Adult Release: Pornography: The Secret History of Civilization
- Best Oral-Themed Release: Feeding Frenzy 8
- Best Oral-Themed Series: Hand To Mouth

**Production (ctd.)**

- Best POV Release: Pole Position: Lex POV 5
- Best POV Series: Jack's POV
- Best Pro-Am Release: Breakin' 'Em In 9
- Best Pro-Am Series: Beaver Hunt
- Best Sex Comedy: Joanna's Angels 2: Alt Throttle
- Best Vignette Release: Jenna Haze Dark Side
- Best Vignette Series: Jack's Playground

**SEX SCENE AWARDS**

- Best All-Girl Sex Scene – Film: Jessica Drake, Katsumi, Felecia, Clara G.; Fuck
- Best Anal Sex Scene – Film: Jada Fire, Sandra Romain, Brian Surewood; Manhunters
- Best Group Sex Scene – Film: Carmen Hart, Katsumi, Kirsten Price, Mia Smiles, Eric Masterson, Chris Cannon, Tommy Gunn, Randy Spears; Fuck
- Best Group Sex Scene – Video: Belladonna, Melissa Lauren, Jenna Haze, Gianna Michaels, Sandra Romain, Adrianna Nicole, Flower Tucci, Sasha Grey, Nicole Sheridan, Marie Luv, Caroline Pierce, Lea Baren, Jewell Marceau, Jean Val Jean, Christian XXX, Voodoo, Chris Charming, Erik Everhard, Mr. Pete, Rocco Siffredi; Fashionistas Safado: The Challenge
- Best Oral Sex Scene – Film: Ice LaFox, Eric Masterson, Tommy Gunn, Marcus London, Mario Rossi; Fuck
- Best POV Sex Scene: Naomi, Tommy Gunn; Jack's POV 2
- Best Sex Scene in a Foreign-Shot Production: Isabel Ice, Sandra Romain, Dora Venter, Cathy, Karina, Nicol, Puma Black, Erik Everhard, Steve Holmes, Robert Rosenberg; Outnumbered 4
- Best Solo Sex Scene: Alana Evans, Corruption
- Best Threeway Sex Scene: Sandra Romain, Sasha Grey, Manuel Ferrara; Fuck Slaves
- Most Outrageous Sex Scene: Ashley Blue, Amber Wild, Steve French in “Meat Is Murder”, Girlvert 11

**SPECIALTY AWARDS**

- Best Solo Release: I Love Big Toys 2
- Best Specialty Release – Big Bust: Breast Worship
- Best Specialty Release – BDSM: My New Girlfriend
- Best Specialty Release – Fem-Dom Strap-On: Strap Attack 4
- Best Specialty Release – Foot Fetish: Barefoot Confidential 40
- Best Specialty Release – MILF: Cheating Housewives 3
- Best Specialty Release – Other Genre: Horny Hairy Girls 22
- Best Specialty Release – Spanking: Baltimore Brat
- Best Specialty Release – Squirting: Flower's Squirt Shower 3
- Best Transsexual Release: Rogue Adventures 27
- Best Specialty Series – Big Bust: Boob Bangers
- Best Specialty Series – MILF: MILF Seeker
- Best Specialty Series – Other Genre: Adorable Girls
- Best Specialty Series – Squirting: Flower's Squirt Shower
- Best Transsexual Series: Transsexual Prostitutes

**TECHNICAL AWARDS**

- Best Art Direction – Film: Fuck
- Best Art Direction – Video: Sacred Sin
- Best Cinematography: Fuck
- Best DVD Extras: The Visitors
- Best DVD Menus: The Visitors
- Best Editing – Film: Justin Sterling, Johnny 5; Jenna's Provocateur
- Best Editing – Video: Robin Dyer, Mark Logan; Corruption
- Best Music: Eddie Van Halen, Loren Alexander; Sacred Sin
- Best Screenplay – Film: Brad Armstrong, Manhunters
- Best Screenplay – Video: Alvin Edwards, Eli Cross; Corruption
- Best Videography: Sacred Sin
- Best Special Effects: Kovi, Porn Wars

=== Honorary AVN Awards ===
==== Reuben Sturman Award ====
- None given this year

==== Hall of Fame ====
AVN Hall of Fame inductees for 2007 were: Rebecca Bardoux, Dave Cummings, Taylor Hayes, Rick Masters, John Seeman, Domonique Simone, Selena Steele, Sydnee Steele, Nici Sterling, Tabitha Stevens, Kyle Stone, Vince Vouyer

- Founders Branch: Charlie Brickman, Cinderella Distribution; Phil Harvey, Adam & Eve; Arthur Morowitz and Howard Farber, Video-X-Pix; Sidney Niekirk, Cal Vista

=== Multiple nominations and awards ===
The following releases received the most nominations.

Nominations	Movie
24	Manhunters
18	Emperor
18	Sacred Sin
17	Corruption
15	Curse Eternal
15	Jenna's Provocateur
14	Fashionistas Safado: The Challenge
14	Tailgunners
13	Blacklight Beauty
13	Fade to Black 2
13	To Die For
13	The Visitors
12	Fuck
12	Island Fever 4
12	Valentina

The following 14 releases received multiple awards:

Awards	Movie
7	Corruption
7	Manhunters
5	Fuck
5	Sacred Sin
3	Fashionistas Safado: The Challenge
2	Blacklight Beauty
2	Breakin' 'Em In 9
2	Flower's Squirt Shower 3
2	Jack's POV 2
2	Jenna Haze Dark Side
2	Pirates
2	Porn Wars: Episode 1
2	Slave Dolls 2
2	The Visitors

== Presenters and performers ==
The following individuals presented awards or performed musical or comedy numbers.

=== Presenters (in order of appearance) ===
Name(s)	Role
Tera Patrick; Jada Fire; Gene Simmons	Presenters of the awards for Best Supporting Actress in a Video Feature and Best Oral Sex Scene
Tera Patrick; Jada Fire	Golden Tongue Award presented to Gene Simmons by the 2007 AVN Awards
Savanna Samson; Sasha Grey; Erik Everhard	Presenters of the awards for Best Tease Performance and Best All-Girl Sex Scene in a Video
Shy Love; Courtney Cummz; Sophia Rossi	Presenters of the awards for Best Couples Sex Scene in a Film and Male Performer of the Year
Criss Angel; Gina Lynn	Presenters of the award for Best Actress in a Film
Ron Jeremy; Mia Rose; Ava Rose	Presenters of the awards for Best Ethnic-Themed Series – Latin and Best Couples Sex Scene in a Video
Jesse Jane; Kirsten Price; Dave Navarro	Presenters of the awards for Best Actor in a Film and Best Anal Sex Scene in a Video
Jim Norton	Introduction of the trophy girls, Paulina James and Casey Parker
Carmen Luvana; Monique Alexander	Presenters of the awards for Best Actor in a Video Feature and Best New Starlet
Flower Tucci; Cassidey; Shane Diesel	Presenters of the awards for Best Actress in a Video and Best All-Sex Release
Marie Luv; Memphis Monroe; Nick Manning	Presenters of the awards for Best Director of a Video Feature and Best Gonzo Release
Jenna Presley; Brea Bennett; Bobby Slayton	Presenters of the awards for Female Performer of the Year and Best Film
Paul Fishbein	Presenter of the awards for Best Renting and Best Selling Titles of the Year
Kimberly Kane; J. D. Harmeyer; Carrot Top	Presenters of the award for Best Video Feature

=== Performers ===
Name(s)	Role	Performed
Mark Stone and the AVN Awards Orchestra	Musical Director/Producer	Orchestral
Olympic Gardens DreamGirls	Performers	Opening dance number
Jim Norton	Performer	Comedy segment
Anthony Hardwood; Nate Hall; Kissy Kapri; Kira Croft	Performers	"Anthony Hardwood's Pornstar Bootcamp" comedy clip
Criss Angel; Brandy Beavers	Performers	Magician act
Fashionistas	Performers	"The Fashionistas" dance musical
Ron Jeremy; Lindsey Meadows; Gia Paloma; Bobbi Starr	Performers	"Pornstar Cologne" comedy clip
Buckcherry	Performers	Musical number, “Crazy Bitch”
Marie Luv; Adrianna Nicole; Lorelei Lee; Sasha Grey	Performers	"Dick Magnet" comedy clip
Lexington Steele; Kitty Langdon; Sincerre; Gianna Michaels; Missy Monroe; Veronica Rayne; J. R. Langdon	Performers	"Myra" comedy clip
Kurt Lockwood; Nikki Hunter; Avy Scott; Sunny Lane	Performers	"Kurt Lockwood Porn Fantasy Rock & Roll Camp" comedy clip

== Ceremony information ==
A new venue, the 12,000-seat Mandalay Bay Events Center, was not the only change made at the 2007 AVN Awards show. For the first time, porn fans could purchase tickets to attend the show; previously only industry insiders were permitted to attend.

While the Best DVD award was discontinued, several new awards debuted: Director of the Year (Body of Work), Contract Star of the Year, Underrated Starlet of the Year (Unrecognized Excellence), Best Animated Release, Best Hard-Edged All-Sex Release, Best Interracial Series, Best POV Series and Best POV Sex Scene. Additionally, the Best Specialty Series was split among five categories—Big Bust, MILF, Squirting and Other, along with Best Transsexual Series; Best Ethnic-Themed Series was split into three—Asian, Black and Latin; and Best Online Marketing Campaign was split into Company and Individual Project categories.

Several other people participated in the production of the ceremony. Mark Stone served as musical director for the ceremony and also produced the comedy clips, mostly spoofing TV infomercials and starring Ron Jeremy, Anthony Hardwood, Kurt Lockwood, Lexington Steele and several others. Members of John Stagliano's Fashionistas gave a special performance of the Fashionistas Las Vegas revue.

Wicked Pictures created and distributed a DVD of the year's show.

=== Performance of year's movies ===
Pirates was announced as the top selling and top renting movie of the previous year.

== In Memoriam ==
AVN publisher Paul Fishbein's annual In Memoriam tribute honored the following people: Adam & Eve's Mary Gates, VCX co-founder Rudy Sutton and actor Jon Dough.

== See also ==
- AVN Award
- AVN Best New Starlet Award
- AVN Award for Male Performer of the Year
- AVN Award for Male Foreign Performer of the Year
- AVN Female Performer of the Year Award
- List of members of the AVN Hall of Fame
- 2007 GayVN Awards
