= Shifting Gears =

Shifting Gears may refer to:

== Technology ==
- Changing gears in controlling a motor vehicle or other machine: see gearbox

== Comics ==
- Spider-Woman: Shifting Gears, a 2015–2017 comic-book series

== Film and television ==
- Shifting Gears: A Bisexual Transmission, a 2008 American bisexual pornographic film by Chi Chi LaRue
- Shifting Gears (film), a 2018 American comedy-drama film
- Shifting Gears (TV series), a 2025 American sitcom starring Tim Allen
- Shifting Gears with Aaron Kaufman, a 2018 automotive TV series featuring Aaron Kaufman

== Music ==
- Shifting Gears (Nancy Sinatra album), 2013
- Shifting Gears (Z-Trip album), 2005
- Shifting Gears, an album by Cooder Graw, 2001
- Shifting Gears, an album by Thirsty Merc, 2015
