= Rocco Siffredi =

Italian pornographic actor (born 1964)

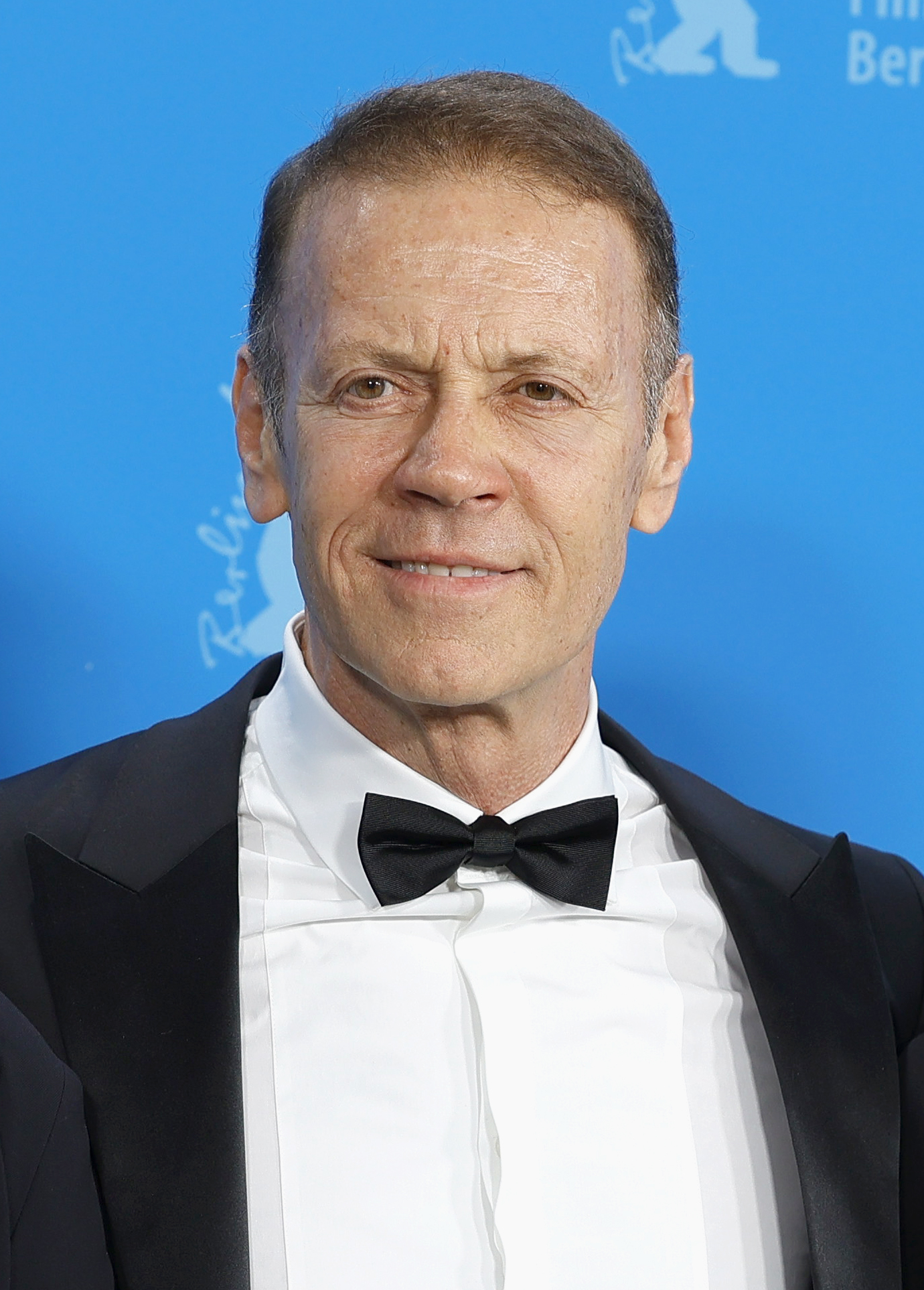
- Siffredi at the 74th Berlin International Film Festival
- Born: Rocco Antonio Tano; 4 May 1964 (age 62); Ortona, Italy
- Other names: Rocko Sifreddi; Rocco de Milano; Rocko Siffredi; Rocco Fiffreddi; Rocco Siffredy; Tano Rocco; Rocco Daryl Tano Jr.; Rocco Daryl Tano; Rocco Ziffredi; Roco; Rocky Siffreddy; Rocco Sieffredi; Rocco Sifredi; Rocco Tano
- Occupations: Pornographic actor; director; producer
- Spouse: Rosa Caracciolo (m. 1993)
- Children: 2
- Website: roccosiffredi.com

Rocco Antonio Tano (born 4 May 1964), known professionally as Rocco Siffredi, is an Italian pornographic actor, director, and producer. He has starred in more than 1,300 pornographic films since 1986.

Siffredi is known for his rough style of pornography, often involving anal sex, spitting, slapping and choking, his collaboration with the pornographic studio Evil Angel, as well as his own productions.

== Pornography career ==
Siffredi first got the idea to work in the porn business after discovering a pornographic magazine as a teenager. He moved to Paris in his early twenties and attended different sex clubs where he was eventually discovered by French porn actor and director Gabriel Pontello, who introduced him to other producers. Siffredi made his pornographic debut in the 1986 film Sodopunition pour dépravées sexuelles. He chose his stage name in reference to the characters Roch Siffredi (Borsalino and Borsalino & Co) and Rocco Parondi (Rocco and His brothers), both played by Alain Delon.

Siffredi briefly stepped away from porn in the late 1980s and worked as a fashion model, but returned to the business with the help of porn actress Teresa Orlowski. Siffredi went on to perform in both plot-based and gonzo-style pornography, with styles of sex ranging from ordinary to extreme. Siffredi's performances involving anal sex and anilingus, as well as rough sex and his psychological intensity and athleticism, earned him recognition and ultimately a cult following.

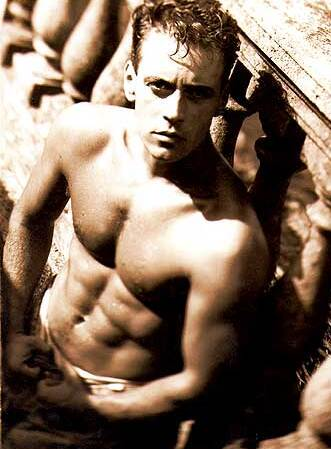
Siffredi in 1988

Through his collaboration with John Stagliano's Evil Angel studio and his own Budapest-based Rocco Siffredi Produzioni as both a performer and director, Siffredi became one of the most influential and recognizable personalities in pornography. "Rocco has far more power in this industry than any actress", Stagliano commented in 2001. Siffredi has credited Stagliano with being his mentor through all 30 years of his career. Actress Bobbi Starr noted of Siffredi, "Any girl in the industry who has been with him... will tell you that they have done things with him that they will never do with anyone else." Speaking of his female partners, Siffredi says, "I want to see emotion... fear... excitement... the eyes going up from being surprised."

=== Retirements and comebacks ===
In June 2004, Siffredi declared that he would retire from performing in porn for the sake of his children, and instead focus on direction and production. "My children are growing up", he said, "and I can no longer just say 'Dad is going to work to make money for the family'. They want to know more." Regarding Siffredi's long career, Axel Braun commented, "The problem is that he's been trying for years to find an 'heir to the throne', but it's no easy task. He thought he found him in Nacho Vidal, but then Nacho went his own way."

Siffredi, while continuing to direct, was largely absent as an on-screen performer for nearly five years. However, sexual frustration and disappointment as a director with his male talent and the state of the porn industry overall led Siffredi to return as a performer in 2009. Despite renewed success, Siffredi announced his retirement once again in 2015, shortly after appearing on the Italian reality television show L'isola dei famosi (The Celebrity Island), which saw him stranded naked and alone on a beach for one week. He was reported to have told a friend, "I never felt so naked as I did then. I was all alone and it gave me a lot of time to think about what is important. And I realised I don't want to lose my wife." In 2015, he told the press, "More than a year ago I started to get uncomfortable in the front of the camera...Something inside of me has changed."

In 2016, a French documentary called Rocco was released about his life and career.

Siffredi would later continue to perform in various pornographic films and his own casting series. In 2020, his cousin and long-time collaborator Gabriel Zero died. Siffredi subsequently announced the possibility of collaborating with his son Lorenzo on productions. In late 2022, Siffredi announced that he had stopped performing in scenes, but stated that he had not retired and noted "I don't say 'I'm retiring' anymore" due to previous retirements and comebacks. He returned to performing for his 4 Cams POV series in 2023.

The 2024 Netflix miniseries Supersex was loosely based on Siffredi's career as a porn performer.

==== Allegations of harassment and abuse ====
In 2024, a journalist who interviewed Siffredi shortly before the launch of Supersex on Netflix alleged that, after their interview, Siffredi sent her a number of "harassing" text and voice messages, which caused her distress and abdominal pain and for which she announced her decision to sue him. Siffredi claimed the journalist offered him "continuous provocation" and invited her to sue and reveal all the exchanged messages.

His Budapest-based Siffredi Hard Academy, promoted as "the world's first university of porn", regularly hosts auditions for aspiring porn actresses. On the Mediaset Italian TV show Le Iene (The Hyenas), in March 2026, sixteen women who had auditioned there stated they'd been "victims of non-consensual sexual practices" during the filming and accused Siffredi of "sexual misconduct." Siffredi's legal team responded by filing a defamation lawsuit against the women, the show's producers and writers, and Mediaset. His lawsuit, in rejecting the allegations, offers as counter evidence footage from scenes filmed on set, as well as the candidates' video consent releases, and their statements ostensibly to the effect that "everything took place consensually."

== In mainstream media ==
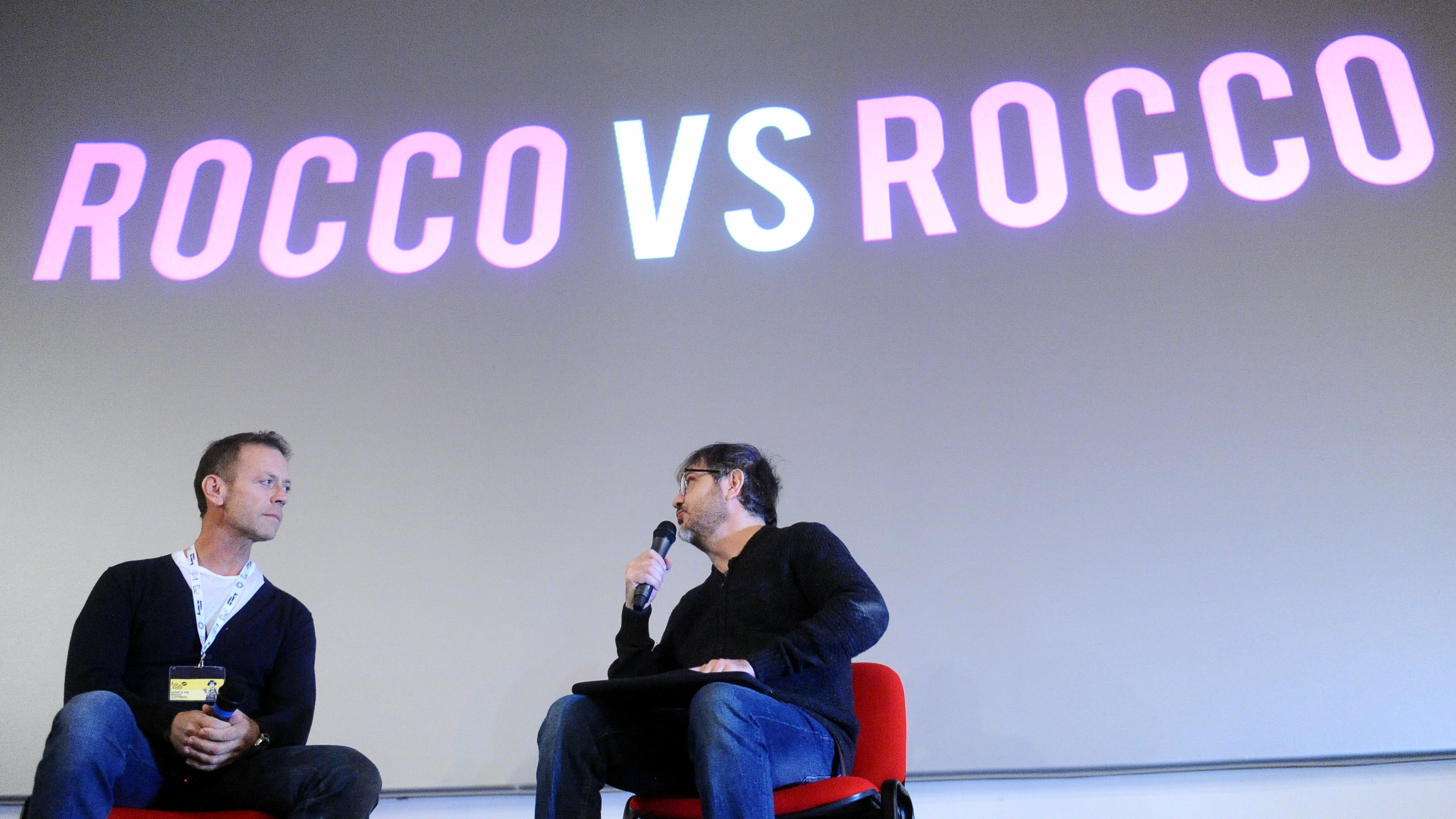
Siffredi being interviewed by Rocco Tanica at Lucca Comics & Games 2016

Siffredi is one of a few porn actors to enjoy crossover appeal and success with respect to other segments of the adult film industry, as well as some in mainstream media.

In 1999, he appeared in the controversial Catherine Breillat film Romance. His performance in this role was followed by a part specifically written for him by the same director in her 2003 film Anatomie de L'enfer (Anatomy of Hell), in which he played a gay man who became sexually involved with a woman. Both films featured unsimulated sexual scenes involving Siffredi, although it is disputed whether he actually had intercourse with co-star Caroline Ducey in Romance (she said no, Siffredi said yes). In 2012, he made a cameo as himself in the successful French comedy Porn in the Hood.

Siffredi is also visible in non-pornographic roles on Italian television, including television commercials for Amica Chips, a snack food, which have spawned considerable controversy and have at one point been taken off the air, a Cielo show, Ci pensa Rocco, and a La5 docu-reality series, Casa Siffredi.

In 1997, Italian band Elio e le Storie Tese dedicated a song and a video, "Rocco e Le Storie Tese", to Siffredi. Siffredi directed the video, in addition to appearing in it. He later sang a duet with the band on the song "Un bacio piccolissimo" at the 63rd edition of the Sanremo Music Festival in 2013. Siffredi appeared as himself in a cameo in the 2018 Italian comedy film Natale a cinque stelle.

In June 2023, Siffredi featured in the Spring-Summer 2024 runway show of Milan-based fashion brand Dsquared², playing the role of a pornographic movie director.

== Personal life ==
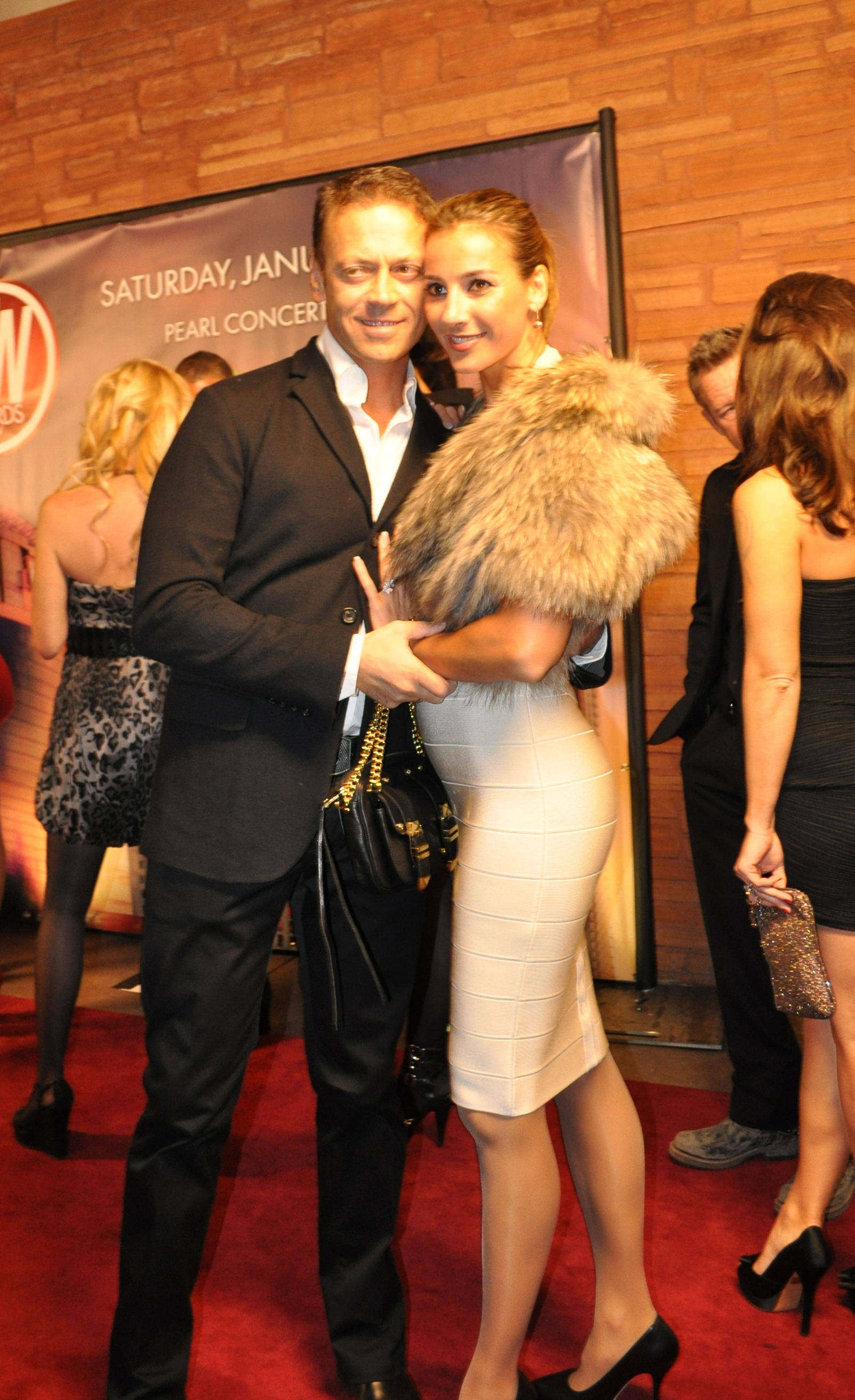
Siffredi with his wife Rosa at the AVN Awards in January 2011

Siffredi is married to Rosa Caracciolo (born Rózsa Tassi), a Hungarian model whom he met in 1993 in Cannes and with whom he performed two years later in Tarzan X: Shame of Jane. Together they have two sons, Lorenzo and Leonardo.

Siffredi's mother died in 1991. The day after her death, he decided to undergo an adult circumcision, later recounting, "I just wanted to feel the pain that my mother felt. I wanted the pain to keep me alive." Siffredi later called the decision "catastrophic", saying that with a foreskin, "you can feel much more fun." During his initial retirement starting in 2004, Siffredi battled sex addiction, disappearing from home for days to have sex, including with trans women, seniors and men. Upon his decision to return to on-screen pornographic performance in 2009, Siffredi recounted, "I spoke with my wife and she said it's my problem only, it doesn't belong to her and the boys. And she said, 'You decided to stop; we never asked you. So if you want to go back, just go back.'" However, after a long period of intensive performing, with much time away from his home in Italy, Siffredi announced his retirement again in 2015 for the sake of his marriage. "Today I can see, my wife, she is the top priority", he said in a press statement. "She deserves to have what she wanted from day one, to be with only me without sharing with other girls." Caracciolo told the press, "I know him very well and I love him for who and what he is. Let's see what the new version of him will be like."

Siffredi's father died in 2013. In 2015, Siffredi discussed his personal life on the reality television show L'isola dei famosi (The Celebrity Island). Speaking of his sexuality, he described his sex addiction as emerging from "some kind of devil in me" and said that it "sometimes sends me out of my mind." He discussed asking God for intervention from the spirit of his mother, whose photograph he always carries. He considers himself "a believer in God".

== In popular culture ==
- Siffredi was featured in the biographical documentary Rocco directed by Thierry Demaizière and Alban Teurlai, which premiered at the Venice Film Festival.
- Siffredi is referenced in the songs "Most People Are DJs" by the American band The Hold Steady, "Roko na Sterydach" ("Rocco on Steroids") by the Polish punk band Anti Dread, "Kundel Bury" and "Wina Satana" by the Polish band Arka Satana, "Rocco Siffredi" by the German rapper SSIO, "Padre Siffredi" by the Danish hardcore band Barcode.
- Underground filmmaker Carlos Atanes stated that Stanley Kubrick, David Lean and Rocco Siffredi were his main film references, and said of Siffredi's work that "Agnes' scene in Rocco invades Poland or Gabriella Kerez' pool scene from True Anal Stories 9 are deeper than any Theo Angelopoulos' movie and show us the human inside more accurately than any Ingmar Bergman's film".
- In the episode "Mère et patrie" of the French crime drama Braquo, Internal Affairs Inspector Roland Vogel jokes that his "tool" would make Rocco Siffredi "hide in shame".
- Siffredi's line "It's only smells" from his scene with Helena White in Rocco's POV 5 became a viral meme in the early 2010s.
- British band The Singing Pictures released a secret track named "Siffredi it" in reference to his porn acting style.
- In Dave Hutchinson's 2014 spy novel Europe in Autumn, Siffredi's name is used as a cover name for an agent.
- Siffredi is mentioned in the journal article "Pharmaco-pornographic Politics: Towards a New Gender Ecology" by Paul B. Preciado.
- Actor Alessandro Borghi portrays Siffredi in the Netflix series Supersex.

== Filmography ==
=== Select pornographic ===
- Buttman's Ultimate Workout (1990)
- Curse of the Cat Woman (1991)
- Buttman's European Vacation (1991)
- New Wave Hookers 3 (1993)
- Bend Over Brazilian Babes 2 (1994)
- Buttman's Big Tit Adventure 3 (1995)
- Buttman & Rocco's Brazilian Butt Fest (2000)
- Buttman and Rocco Go to Montreal (2001)
- Fashionistas (2002)
- Rocco Smashes Tunes Back Doors In (2005)

=== Non-pornographic ===
Year	Title	Role	Notes
1999	Romance	Paolo	Feature film debut
2001	Amorestremo	Silver	
2004	Anatomy of Hell	Him	
2011	Wedding in Paris	François Leroy	
2012	I Cesaroni	Himself	Episode: "Senza mezze misure"
2012	Tutti i rumori del mare	Thomas's friend	
2014	Amore oggi	Doctor of sex	Television film
2016	Rocco	Himself	Documentary film
2018	Natale a cinque stelle	Himself	
2024	Supersex	Man at table	Uncredited appearance; episode: "La carne"

== Awards and nominations ==
List of awards and nominations received by Rocco Siffredi
Awards and nominations
Award	Wins	Nominations
AVN Awards	33	39
XRCO Awards	13	1
XBIZ Awards	7	15
NightMoves Awards	1	0
Hot d'Or Awards	2	0
Ninfa Awards	6	0
Venus Awards	3	0
Legends of Erotica	1	0
Erotic Lounge Awards	0	3
- Total number of wins and nominations
Totals	72	56
- References

=== AVN Awards ===
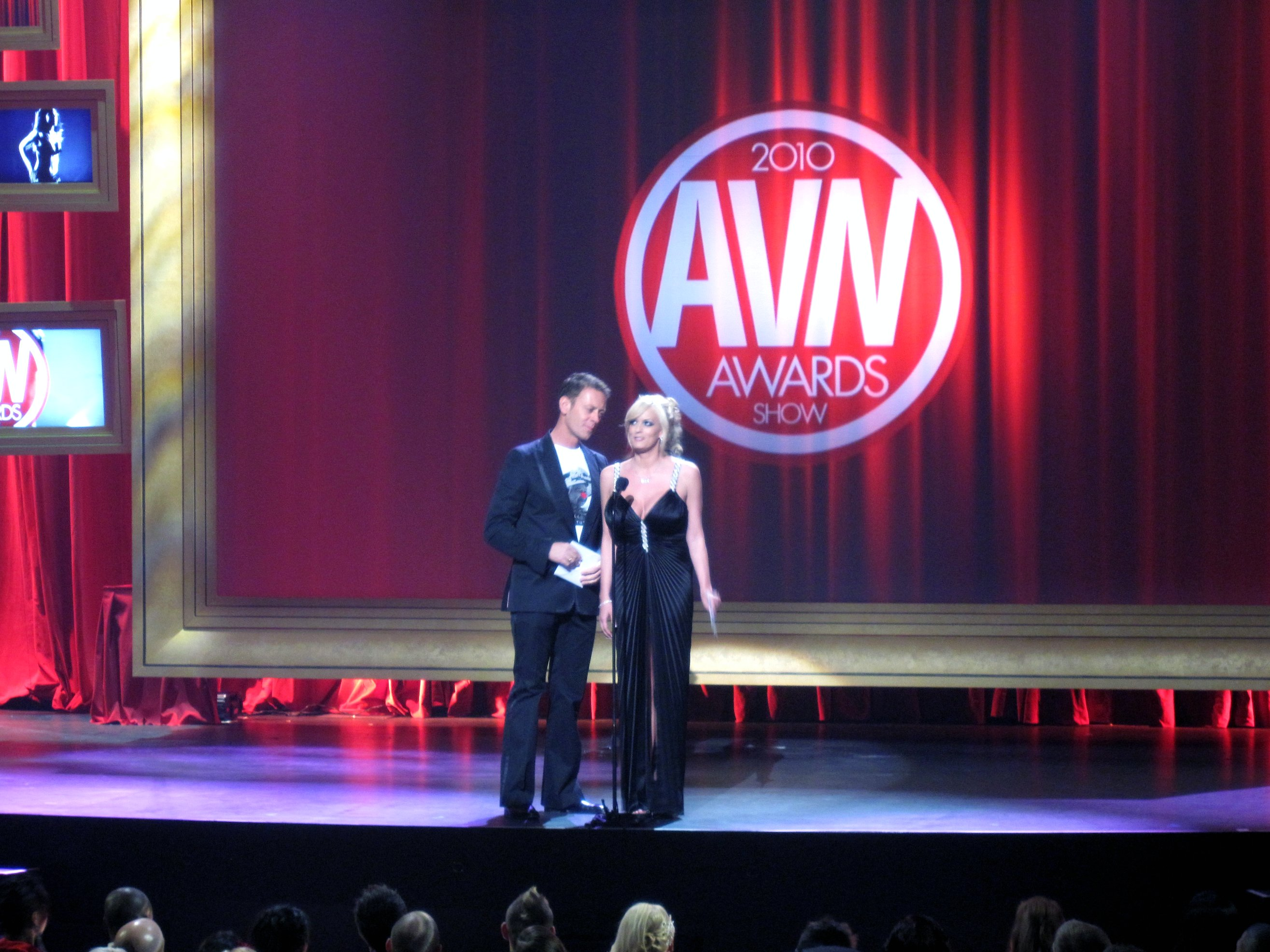
Siffredi with Stormy Daniels at AVN Awards in 2010

Won

Year	Award	Film	Shared with	Result
1991	Best Group Sex Scene – Video	Buttman's Ultimate Workout	Alexandra Quinn and Sunny McKay	Won
1992	Best Couples Sex Scene – Video	Buttman's European Vacation	Silver Forrest	Won
1992	Best Group Sex Scene – Video	Buttman's European Vacation	Silver Forrest and Zara Whites	Won
1993	Male Performer of the Year	—N/a	—N/a	Won
1994	Best Group Sex Scene – Film	New Wave Hookers 3	Crystal Wilder, Francesca Le, Jon Dough, Lacy Rose and Tiffany Million	Won
1995	Best Anal Sex Scene – Video	Bend Over Brazilian Babes 2	Felipé, Jessica and Sara	Won
1996	Male Performer of the Year	—N/a	—N/a	Won
1996	Best Couples Sex Scene – Video	Buttman's Big Tit Adventure 3	Debbie Dee	Won
1997	Best Couples Sex Scene – Film	Jenna Loves Rocco	Jenna Jameson	Won
1997	Best Group Sex Scene – Video	Buttman's Bend Over Babes 4	Christi Lake, John Stagliano and Ruby	Won
1997	Best Anal Sex Scene – Video	Buttman's Bend Over Babes 4	Danielle Louise Kelson and Laura Turner	Won
1998	Best Couples Sex Scene	Buda	Ursula Moore	Won
2000	Best Sex Scene in a Foreign Release	When Rocco Meats Kelly 2: In Barcelona	Alba Dea Monte, Kelly and Nacho Vidal	Won
2002	Best Couples Sex Scene – Video	Rocco's Way to Love	Kelly Stafford	Won
2002	AVN Hall of Fame	—N/a	—N/a	Won
2003	Male Foreign Performer of the Year	—N/a	—N/a	Won
2003	Best Anal Sex Scene – Film	Fashionistas	Kate Frost	Won
2003	Best Oral Sex Scene – Film	Fashionistas	Belladonna	Won
2003	Best Group Sex Scene – Film	Fashionistas	Friday, Sharon Wild and Taylor St. Claire	Won
2003	Best Director – Video	The Ass Collector	—N/a	Won
2003	Best Sex Scene in a Foreign-Shot Production	The Ass Collector	Henrietta, Karib, Katalin, Monik, Nikita, Niky, Petra Short, Sheila Scott, Stella Virgin and Veronica B. Cindy	Won
2005	Best Sex Scene in a Foreign-Shot Production	Rocco Ravishes Russia	—N/a	Won
2006	Best Director – Foreign Release	Who Fucked Rocco?	—N/a	Won
2007	Best Group Sex Scene – Video	Fashionistas Safado: The Challenge	Adrianna Nicole, Belladonna, Caroline Pierce, Chris Charming, Christian XXX, Erik Everhard, Flower Tucci, Gianna Michaels, Jean Val Jean, Jenna Haze, Jewell Marceau, Lea Baren, Marie Luv, Melissa Lauren, Mr. Pete, Nicole Sheridan, Sandra Romain, Sasha Grey and Voodoo	Won
2008	Best Group Sex Scene – Video	Fashionistas Safado: Berlin	Annette Schwarz, Judith Fox, Sintia Stone and Vanessa Hill	Won
2008	Best Three-Way Sex Scene	Fashionistas Safado: Berlin	Katsuni and Melissa Lauren	Won
2009	Male Foreign Performer of the Year	—N/a	—N/a	Won
2011	Male Foreign Performer of the Year	—N/a	—N/a	Won
2012	Male Foreign Performer of the Year	—N/a	—N/a	Won
2013	Best Sex Scene in a Foreign-Shot Production	Aliz Loves Rocco	Bibi Noel and Mira	Won
2013	Male Foreign Performer of the Year	—N/a	—N/a	Won
2013	Most Outrageous Sex Scene	Voracious: The First Season	Brooklyn Lee	Won
2014	Male Foreign Performer of the Year	—N/a	—N/a	Won
2015	Best Sex Scene in a Foreign-Shot Production	Rocco's Perfect Slaves 2	Henessy and Samantha Bentley	Won
2015	Male Foreign Performer of the Year	—N/a	—N/a	Won
2019	Best Anal Sex Scene	I Am Angela	Angela White	Won
2019	Male Foreign Performer of the Year	—N/a	—N/a	Won
2019	Foreign Director of the Year	—N/a	—N/a	Won
2021	Male Foreign Performer of The Year	—N/a	—N/a	Won

Nominated

Year	Award	Film	Result
2000	Male Performer of The Year	—N/a	Nominated
2003	Best Actor	Fashionistas	Nominated
2003	Best Anal Sex Scene	Fashionistas	Nominated
2003	Best Group Sex Scene	Fashionistas	Nominated
2003	Best Oral Sex Scene	Fashionistas	Nominated
2003	Best Scene Coupling	Fashionistas	Nominated
2003	Best Scene Coupling	Taylor Loves Rocco 2	Nominated
2003	Best Supporting Actor	Rocco's Ass Collector	Nominated
2003	Male Foreign Performer of The Year	—N/a	Nominated
2010	Male Foreign Performer of The Year	—N/a	Nominated
2011	Director of The Year	—N/a	Nominated
2012	Best Sex Scene in a Foreign-Shot Production	Rocco's Dirty Teens	Nominated
2012	Best Three Way Sex Scene: Girl/Girl/Boy	Rocco's American Adventures	Nominated
2012	Most Outrageous Sex Scene	Rocco's American Adventures	Nominated
2014	Best Sex Scene in a Foreign-Shot Production	XXX Factory	Nominated
2014	Best Sex Scene in a Foreign-Shot Production	Rocco's Perfect Slaves	Nominated
2015	Best Anal Sex Scene	Rocco's Coming in America	Nominated
2015	Best POV Sex Scene	Rocco's Coming in America	Nominated
2015	Best Porn Star Website	—N/a	Nominated
2015	Favourite Male Porn Star (Fan Award)	—N/a	Nominated
2015	Most Outrageous Sex Scene	Voraxious II (Volume -IV)	Nominated
2016	Best POV Sex Scene	Rocco's Intimate Initiations	Nominated
2016	Best Sex Scene in a Foreign-Shot Production	Rocco's Perfect Slaves 5	Nominated
2016	Best Sex Scene in a Foreign-Shot Production	Bonnie vs. Rocco	Nominated
2016	Best Three Way Sex Scene: Girl/Girl/Boy	Rocco's Intimate Initiations	Nominated
2016	Favourite Male Porn Star (Fan Award)	—N/a	Nominated
2017	Best Sex Scene in a Foreign-Shot Production	Rocco's Italian Porn Boot Camp 2	Nominated
2017	Best Three-Way Sex Scene: Girl/Girl/Boy	Rocco's Perfect Slaves 8	Nominated
2017	Male Foreign Performer of The Year	—N/a	Nominated
2018	Male Foreign Performer of The Year	—N/a	Nominated
2018	Mainstream Star of The Year	—N/a	Nominated
2018	Best Sex Scene in a Foreign-Shot Production	Rocco: Sex Analyst	Nominated
2019	Best Foreign-Shot Group Sex Scene	Rocco: Sex Analyst 3	Nominated
2019	Best Foreign-Shot Group Sex Scene	Teens vs MILFs 7	Nominated

=== Hot d'Or Awards ===
Year	Actor	Result
1996	Best European Actor	Won
1997	Best European Actor	Won

=== NightMoves Awards ===
Year	Award	Result
1997	Best Actor	Won

=== Ninfa Awards ===
Year	Award	Film	Shared with	Result
2002	Best Actor	Ass Collector	—N/a	Won
2002	Best Director	Ass Collector	—N/a	Won
2004	Special Jury Award	—N/a	—N/a	Won
2005	Most Original Sex Scene	Who Fucked Rocco?	Venus	Won
2007	Best Actor	Fashionistas Safado	—N/a	Won
2007	Most Original Sex Sequence	Fashionistas Safado	Belladonna, Gianna Michaels, Jean Val Jean, Jenna Haze, Melissa Lauren and Sandra Romain	Won

=== Venus Awards ===
Year	Award	Result
1997	Best Actor (Europe)	Won
2000	Best Actor (European)	Won
2003	Best Actor (Europe)	Won

=== XBIZ Awards ===
Won

Year	Award	Result
2011	Foreign Male Performer of the Year	Won
2015	Foreign Male Performer of the Year	Won
2016	Foreign Director of the Year	Won
2017	Foreign Director of the Year	Won
2017	Foreign Non-Feature Release of the Year	Won
2019	Foreign Director of the Year	Won
2019	Foreign Non-Feature Release of the Year	Won

Nominated

Year	Award	Film	Result
2012	Foreign Male Performer of The Year	—N/a	Nominated
2013	Best Supporting Actor	Voracious	Nominated
2013	Foreign Male Performer of The Year	—N/a	Nominated
2014	Foreign Male Performer of The Year	—N/a	Nominated
2014	Crossover Star of The Year	—N/a	Nominated
2015	Best Actor - Feature Movie	Voracious II (Volume - II)	Nominated
2015	Best Scene - Feature Movie	Voracious II (Volume - III)	Nominated
2015	Best Scene - Non-Fearure Release	Rocco's Coming in America	Nominated
2016	Best Scene - Gonzo Release	Rocco's Perfect Slaves 4: American Edition	Nominated
2016	Crossover Star of The Year	—N/a	Nominated
2016	Foreign Male Performer of The Year	—N/a	Nominated
2017	Crossover Star of The Year	—N/a	Nominated
2017	Foreign Male Performer of The Year	—N/a	Nominated
2018	Foreign Male Performer of The Year	—N/a	Nominated
2019	Foreign Male Performer of The Year	—N/a	Nominated

=== XRCO Awards ===
Won

Year	Award	Film	Shared with	Result
1992	Best Group Sex Scene	Face Dance	—N/a	Won
1993	Male Performer of the Year	—N/a	—N/a	Won
1993	Best Couples Sex Scene	Chameleons: Not The Sequel	Ashlyn Gere	Won
1993	Best Anal Sex Scene	Face Dance II	Sierra	Won
1994	Best Couples Scene	New Wave Hookers 3	Crystal Wilder	Won
1995	Best Group Scene	Buttman's British Moderately Big Tit Adventure	Janey Lamb, Joey Silvera and Stephanie Hart-Rogers	Won
1996	Best Male-Female Couple Scene	Kink	Careena Collins	Won
2000	Best Anal or D.P. Sex Scene	When Rocco Meats Kelly 2	Alba Dea Monte, Kelly and Nacho Vidal	Won
2001	XRCO Hall of Fame	—N/a	—N/a	Won
2003	Best Group Sex Scene	Fashionistas	Friday, Sharon Wild and Taylor St. Claire	Won
2003	Best Actor	Fashionistas	—N/a	Won
2003	Best Male/Female Sex Scene	Fashionistas	Taylor St. Claire	Won
2007	Best On-Screen Chemistry	Fashionistas Safado: The Challenge	Gianna Michaels and Jenna Haze	Won

Nominated

Year	Award	Film	Shared with	Result
2006	Best Actor	Fashionistas Safado: The Challenge	—N/a	Nominated
2006	Best Actor	Emperor	—N/a	Nominated
2011	Best Cumback	—N/a	—N/a	Nominated

=== Erotic Lounge Awards ===
Year	Award	Result
2011	Bester Darsteller (Fan Award)	Nominated
2012	Bester Darsteller (Fan Award)	Nominated
2013	Bester Darsteller (Fan Award)	Nominated

== See also ==
- List of pornographic actors who appeared in mainstream films
