= Rocco (film) =

- Film poster
- Directed by: Thierry Demaizière; Alban Teurlai
- Produced by: Fabrice Coat; Stéphane Célérier; Valérie Garcia; Stéphanie Schorter Champenier; Michel Spavone
- Starring: Rocco Siffredi; Rosa Caracciolo; Arabella Danger; James Deen; Gabriele Galetta; Mark Spiegler; Kelly Stafford
- Cinematography: Alban Teurlai
- Edited by: Alban Teurlai
- Music by: Pierre Aviat
- Production companies: Program 33; Mars Films; Falabracks; Centre National de la Cinématographie; Orange Cinéma Séries
- Distributed by: Mars Distribution (France) (theatrical); Netflix (Australia) (VOD); Wild Bunch (Worldwide, except France)
- Release date: September 5, 2016 (Venice Film Festival)
- Running time: 105 minutes
- Country: France
- Languages: English; French; Hungarian; Italian

Rocco is a 2016 French documentary film, co-directed by Thierry Demaizière and Alban Teurlai.

== Synopsis ==
A biographical documentary of famed adult film star Rocco Siffredi who struggles with an inner conflict and ambivalence about his work as well as uncertainty about his future considers closing out his career with a final production in San Francisco. Interviews reveal Rocco's struggle with the death of his mother, his high standards for quality narrative content as a director and producer, his production planning and execution with his cousin, and his relatively undramatic role as a husband and father to two sons. Additional interviews with women in different stages of their career as an adult film actress reveal different perspectives on the matter--from vulnerability and empowerment to injuries sustained during production.

== Cast ==
- Rocco Siffredi as himself
- Rosa Caracciolo as herself
- Abella Danger as herself
- James Deen as himself
- Gabriele Galetta as himself
- Mark Spiegler as himself
- Kelly Stafford as herself

== Reception ==
Boyd van Hoeij from The Hollywood Reporter, called it a "fascinating and beautifully crafted work that tries to paint a nuanced picture of the man himself and, to an extent, the industry in which he worked". E. Nina Rothe from The Huffington Post, wrote: "From its opening shot, it's clear that Rocco is not a film for the faint of heart. It is raw, hard-core, violent and savage. And yet, hidden beneath this world of porn and Rocco Siffredi—the film's anti-hero with a Faustian secret—lies a message about how empowered we each are, when it comes to our own sexuality."

Rocco won the NIN Award at the FEST International Film Festival.
