= Kirsten Price (actress) =

American pornographic film actress (born 1981/1982)

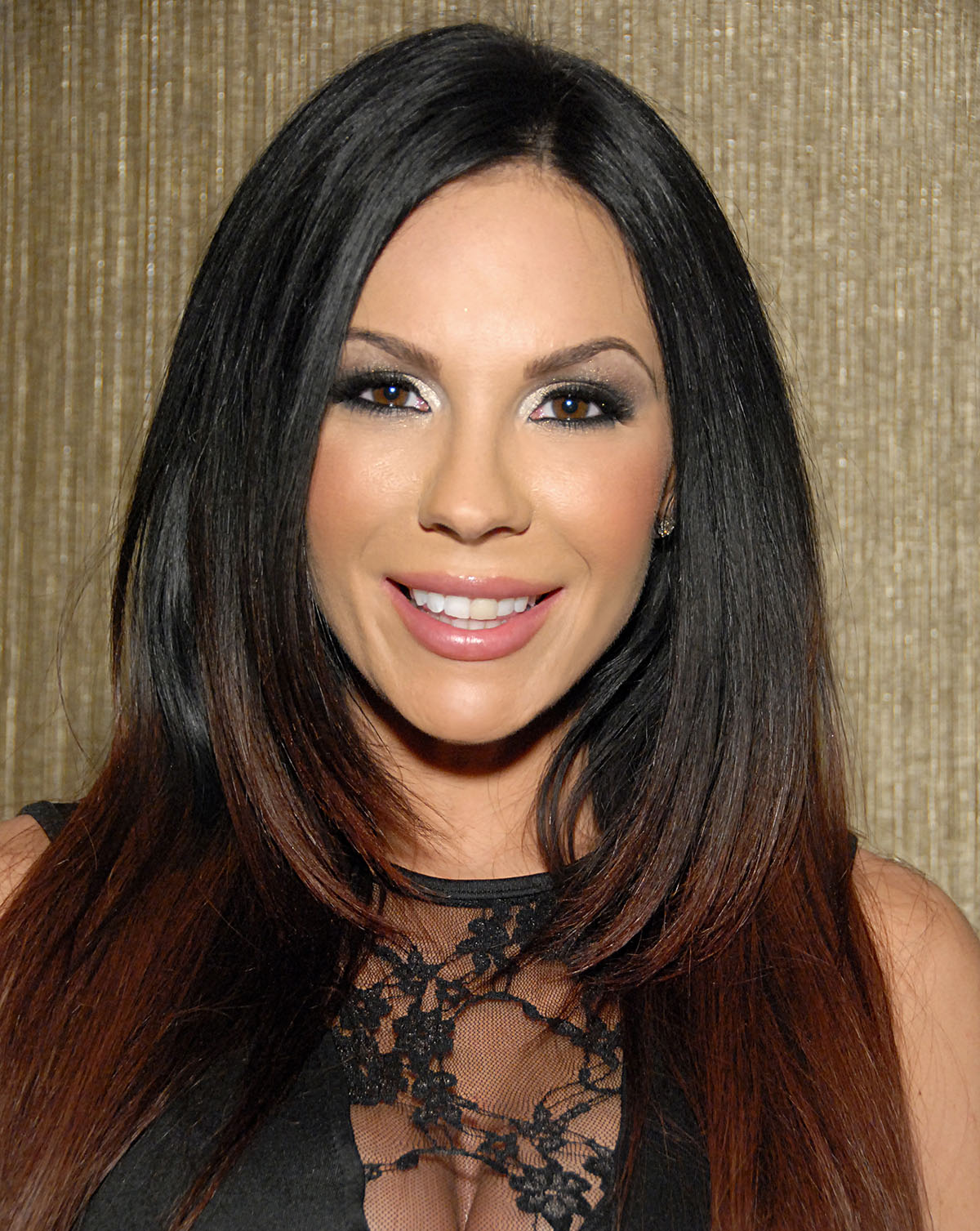
- Price in 2013
- Born: November 13, 1981 (age 45); Providence, Rhode Island, U.S.
- Occupations: Pornographic film actress; model; exotic dancer
- Spouses: Barrett Blade (m. 2004; div. 2006); Keiran Lee (m. 2013)
- Children: 3
- Website: kirstenpricevip.com

Kirsten Price (born November 13, 1981) is an American pornographic film actress, model, and exotic dancer.

== Early life ==
Price was born in Providence, Rhode Island and was raised in Boston, Massachusetts. She studied criminal justice while attending Fisher College in Massachusetts, and she has also lived in New York City, where she worked as a go-go dancer and cocktail waitress.

== Career ==
Price chose the first name Kirsten for her stage name because it was the real name of her best friend, who was also an adult entertainer. She has stated that, as a child, she wanted to be a model on The Price Is Right, which is how she came up with the last name Price. Her first two scenes were in Dressed for Sex for Original Sin Films and Wet Teens 7 for Simon Wolf Productions. She eventually signed a contract with Wicked Pictures in 2005. She also competed in Miss Hawaiian Tropic pageants before entering the adult film industry.

In 2006, Price appeared as one of four finalists (and the eventual winner) on the first season of the reality TV program My Bare Lady. In March 2006, Jesse Jane and Price became the hosts of Playboy TV's most popular live show, Night Calls, and Price has previously hosted the Playboy TV series The Bang. Price also played a small role in an episode of the television series Weeds.

Price co-hosted the 2010 AVN Awards show, along with porn actress Kayden Kross and comedian Dave Attell. In 2010 and 2011, Price appeared several times, including as an extreme sports correspondent, on the G4TV late-night program "Rated A For Adult". She has worked for both Playboy and Showtime as a red-carpet reporter, and she has co-hosted (with Dave Navarro) the AVN Awards red carpet event for several years.

== Personal life ==
Price married fellow porn actor Barrett Blade on October 9, 2004, but they have since divorced. She took a break from adult films for a while after she got divorced from Blade. She then married pornographic film actor Keiran Lee, and the couple have three children.

== Awards ==
- 2007 AVN Award – Best Supporting Actress (Film) – Manhunters
- 2007 AVN Award – Best Group Sex Scene (Film) – FUCK (with Carmen Hart, Katsumi, Mia Smiles, Eric Masterson, Chris Cannon, Tommy Gunn, & Randy Spears)
- 2010 AVN Award – Best Group Sex Scene – 2040 (with Jessica Drake, Alektra Blue, Mikayla Mendez, Kaylani Lei, Tory Lane, Jayden Jaymes, Kayla Carrera, Randy Spears, Brad Armstrong, Rocco Reed, Marcus London, Mick Blue, & T.J. Cummings)
- 2018 AVN Hall of Fame
