= Céline Tran =

French pornographic film actress

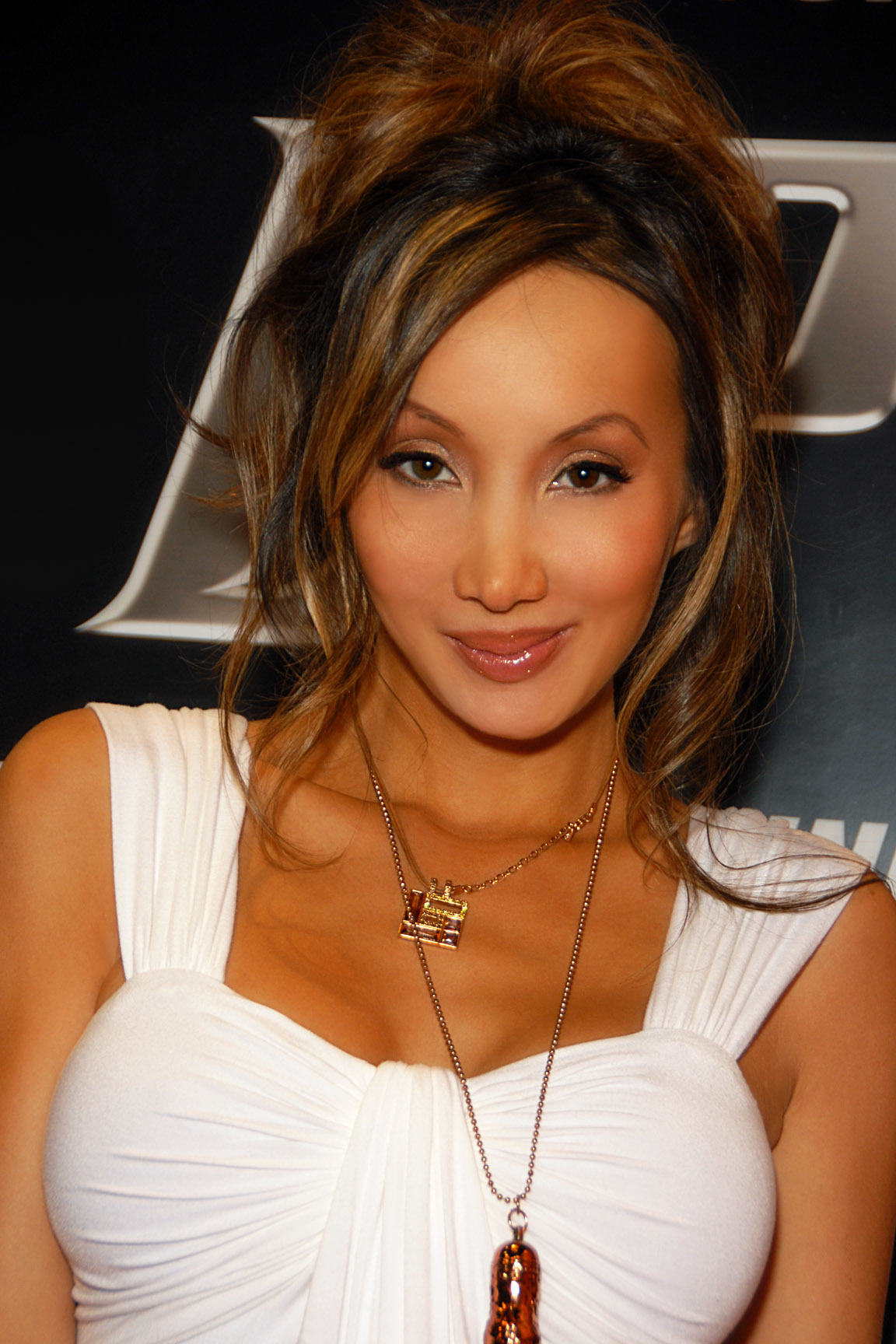
- Tran in 2010
- Born: 1978 or 1979 (age 46–47)
- Other name: Katsuni
- Years active: 2001–2013 (pornography); 2014–present (mainstream)

Céline Tran (born 1978 or 1979) is a French actress, writer, martial artist, blogger, and former pornographic film actress who performed under the stage names Katsuni and Katsumi. She started her adult film career in 2001, working first in France, then in the United States.

She received numerous awards in the course of the adult career, most notably the AVN Award for Female Foreign Performer of the Year which she has won three times.

She retired from pornography in 2013 and returned to France to pursue a career in mainstream entertainment under her real name. Tran has appeared in films such as the French comedy Porn in the Hood (2012), and Cambodian action film Jailbreak (2017). She also released an autobiography, Ne dis pas que tu aimes ça, in 2018.

== Early life ==
Tran is of French/Vietnamese heritage. Her father is Vietnamese and her mother's family is French.

She studied for a year at Grenoble Institute of Political Studies. Finding herself ill-suited for political science, she dropped out and then studied literature for three years, envisioning a career as a teacher. During her studies, she did gigs as a go-go dancer, which led her to be spotted by a photographer working for Penthouse. The magazine's French branch was then looking for actresses who would appear in its adult pictures. Tran accepted Penthouse's proposal for a shoot as a manner of challenge and because she thought it might be an exciting experience.

== Career ==
=== Adult film career in France and in the United States ===
Having enjoyed her first experience, she decided to pursue a career in the adult film industry. For two years, she shot movies while continuing her studies but eventually renounced becoming a teacher and decided to pursue a career as a full-time adult actress.

She joined the pornography industry in 2001. In 2004, she was voted "the French's favorite porn actress" in a readers' poll organized by trade journal Hot Vidéo. She also appeared in several Italian and Spanish productions, working for directors such as Mario Salieri. She performed alongside Rocco Siffredi in Who fucked Rocco ?, Fashionistas Safado: The Challenge and Fashionistas Safado: Berlin, the latter two being directed by John Stagliano.

She shot her first American films in 2003. In 2005, she decided to focus on her work in the United States whose industry offered better opportunities. During the next few years, she divided her time between France and the US, working mostly in the latter country. In December 2006, she became the first French actress to sign an exclusive performing contract with Digital Playground.

She originally performed using the stage name Katsumi (a common given name in Japan for both sexes), but she was barred by a French judge in Créteil in January 2007 from using the name, after a woman named Mary Katsumi sued over the resemblance to her own name. Although she had informed the websites that she had changed her stage name, many outlets kept referring to her as "Katsumi". She was eventually sued again a few months later and, in September 2007, was fined €20,000, having been deemed responsible for various violations of the ban.

Tran also modelled for the cover of Marquis magazine, a leader in fetishism. She also continued working and touring as an exotic dancer in nightclubs of various countries.

In July 2008, Tran released My Fucking Life, a French-language film made for Marc Dorcel Studios. The movie is partly a documentary on Tran's daily life over a year, with a look at her shoots in Las Vegas, on set during filming in Porn Valley, along with a bit of her personal life. In 2008, she was part of the cast of Pirates II: Stagnetti's Revenge, one of the most expensive pornographic films ever produced. In 2012, she directed another feature for Dorcel, In bed with Katsuni. In 2011, Complex ranked Tran fourteenth on their list of "The Top 100 Hottest Porn Stars Right Now" and third on their list of "The Top 50 Hottest Asian Porn Stars of All Time".

=== Other media ===
In the mid-2010s, Tran hosted the weekly French TV show En attendant minuit, broadcast by TPS Star.

During her adult career, Tran's personality and success in the United States attracted the attention of French mainstream media. In October 2009 she was a guest in the popular talk show On n'est pas couché. In the early 2010s, she wrote articles about the pornography industry for the magazines Les Inrockuptibles and Le Nouvel Observateur.

In 2010–2011, she hosted on the French channel MCM Katsuni's sexy mangas, a TV show dedicated to hentai. The show was eventually canceled in March 2011 due to a decision of France's Superior Council of Audiovisual content. Among other appearances in French mainstream media, she played herself in the successful comedy film Porn in the Hood (2012). In 2013, she was one of the porn stars interviewed in the American documentary film Aroused, directed by photographer Deborah Anderson.

=== Retirement from pornography ===
On 14 August 2013, Tran announced that she was retiring from pornography to focus on "a new kind of entertainment". She relocated to France and has been using since then her birth name, Céline Tran. A few months after her retirement, she was inducted into the AVN Hall of Fame.

=== Post-pornography career ===
Tran has since appeared in several mainstream productions. In 2014, she played a recurring character in the French web fiction Le Visiteur du futur. Also in 2014, she wrote the script for Heart Breaker, the sixth volume of the French comic book horror series DoggyBags. In 2016, she started working as a DJ and writing a blog focusing on cultural and sexual themes. She also underwent three years of martial arts training to secure roles in action films. In 2017, she hosted on Facebook Live, for the French community website NextPLZ a show about sexuality aimed at youngsters, published a second graphic novel in the DoggyBags collection, and created a YouTube channel dedicated to sports.

Also in 2017, she made her debut in an action feature film by playing the main villainess in the Cambodian film Jailbreak. Screen Anarchy reviewed her performance positively, commenting that she "displayed tremendous ability to handle the choreography and swordplay" and praising her fight scene with the film's female protagonist, Tharoth Sam.

In 2018, her autobiography, titled Ne dis pas que tu aimes ça (Don't say you like it) was released in France. At the same time, she started working as a publisher for Glénat Editions.

In 2022, she is announced in the credits of the series The Witcher: Blood Origin as the stunt double of the actress Michelle Yeoh.

== Awards ==
- 2002 FICEB Ninfa Award – Best Starlette (L'Affaire Katsumi – Marc Dorcel / International Film Grup)
- 2004 AVN Award – Best Anal Sex Scene, Video (Multiple P.O.V.) with Gisselle & Michael Stefano
- 2004 AVN Award – Best Sex Scene in a Foreign-Shot Production (L'Affaire Katsumi) with Steve Holmes
- 2004 FICEB Ninfa Award – Best Actress (PokerWom – Harmony), Best Lesbian Sequence (Las reinas de la noche – International film grup) with Rita Faltoyano, and Best Anal Sequence (Slam it – In deeper – Harmony)
- 2004 European X Award – Best Actress (France)
- 2004 XRCO Award – Best Sex Scene, Couple (Lex Steele XXX 3 – Mercenary Pictures) with Lexington Steele
- 2004 Venus Award – Best European actress
- 2005 AVN Award – Female Foreign Performer of the Year
- 2005 AVN Award – Best Anal Sex Scene, Video (Lex Steele XXX 3) with Lexington Steele
- 2005 AVN Award – Best Group Sex Scene, Film (Dual Identity) with Savanna Samson & Alec Metro
- 2005 AVN Award – Best Foreign All-Sex Release (Lost Angels: Katsumi)
- 2005 FICEB Ninfa Award – Best Actress (Who Fucked Rocco)
- 2006 AVN Award – Female Foreign Performer of the Year
- 2006 AVN Award – Best Anal Sex Scene, Video (Cumshitters) with Manuel Ferrara
- 2006 AVN Award – Best Tease Performance (Ass Worship 7)
- 2006 AVN Award – Best Interactive DVD (Virtual Katsumi)
- 2006 Venus Paris Fair / Euroline Awards – Best Actress (France)
- 2007 AVN Award – Female Foreign Performer of the Year
- 2007 AVN Award – Best Supporting Actress - Video (Fashionistas Safado: The Challenge)
- 2007 AVN Award – Best Group Sex Scene, Film (Fuck) with Carmen Hart, Kirsten Price, Mia Smiles, Eric Masterson, Chris Cannon, Tommy Gunn & Randy Spears
- 2007 AVN Award – Best All-Girl Sex Scene, Film (Fuck) with Jessica Drake, Felecia & Clara G
- 2007 FICEB Ninfa Award – Best Actress (French Connection)
- 2008 FICEB Ninfa Award – Most Original Sex Scene (The Fashionistas Safado Berlin 1) with Melissa Lauren & Nacho Vidal
- 2008 AVN Award – Best Three-way Sex Scene (Fashionistas Safado: Berlin) with Melissa Lauren & Rocco Siffredi
- 2009 Hot d'Or Award – Best French Actress (Pirates II: Stagnetti's Revenge)
- 2009 Hot d'Or Award – Best Actress Blog
- 2010 XFANZ Award – Asian Star of the Year
- 2011 AVN Award – Best All-Girl Group Sex Scene (Body Heat) with Raven Alexis, Jesse Jane, Kayden Kross & Riley Steele
- 2011 AVN Award – Wildest Sex Scene (Fan Award) – Body Heat
- 2011 XBIZ Award – Foreign Female Performer of the Year
- 2012 XBIZ Award – Crossover Star of the Year
- 2014 AVN Hall of Fame Inductee

== Non-pornographic appearances ==
- 2006 : Destricted, segment We fuck alone, directed by Gaspar Noé
- 2009 : Lascars, directed by Emmanuel Klotz and Albert Pereira-Lazaro (voice only)
- 2011 : Xanadu (television series)
- 2012 : Porn in the Hood, directed by Franck Gastambide
- 2014 : Métal Hurlant Chronicles (season two, one episode)
- 2014 : Le Visiteur du futur (web fiction), directed by François Descraques
- 2015 : Epic fitness (web fiction)
- 2015 : Les Tutos : le noël de Camille (web fiction)
- 2017 : Jailbreak, directed by Jimmy Henderson

== Comics ==
- 2014 : DoggyBags volume 6 : Heartbreaker, (co-wrote the script with Run; art by Jérémie Gasparutto, Florent Maudoux and Guillaume Singelin), Ankama Éditions
- 2017 : Doggybags présente : Heartbreaker, (co-wrote the script with Run and Hasteda; art by Sourya, Maria Llovet and Chariospirale), Ankama Éditions

== Autobiography ==
- 2018 : Ne dis pas que tu aimes ça, Fayard
