= Tommy Gunn (actor) =

American pornographic actor and director

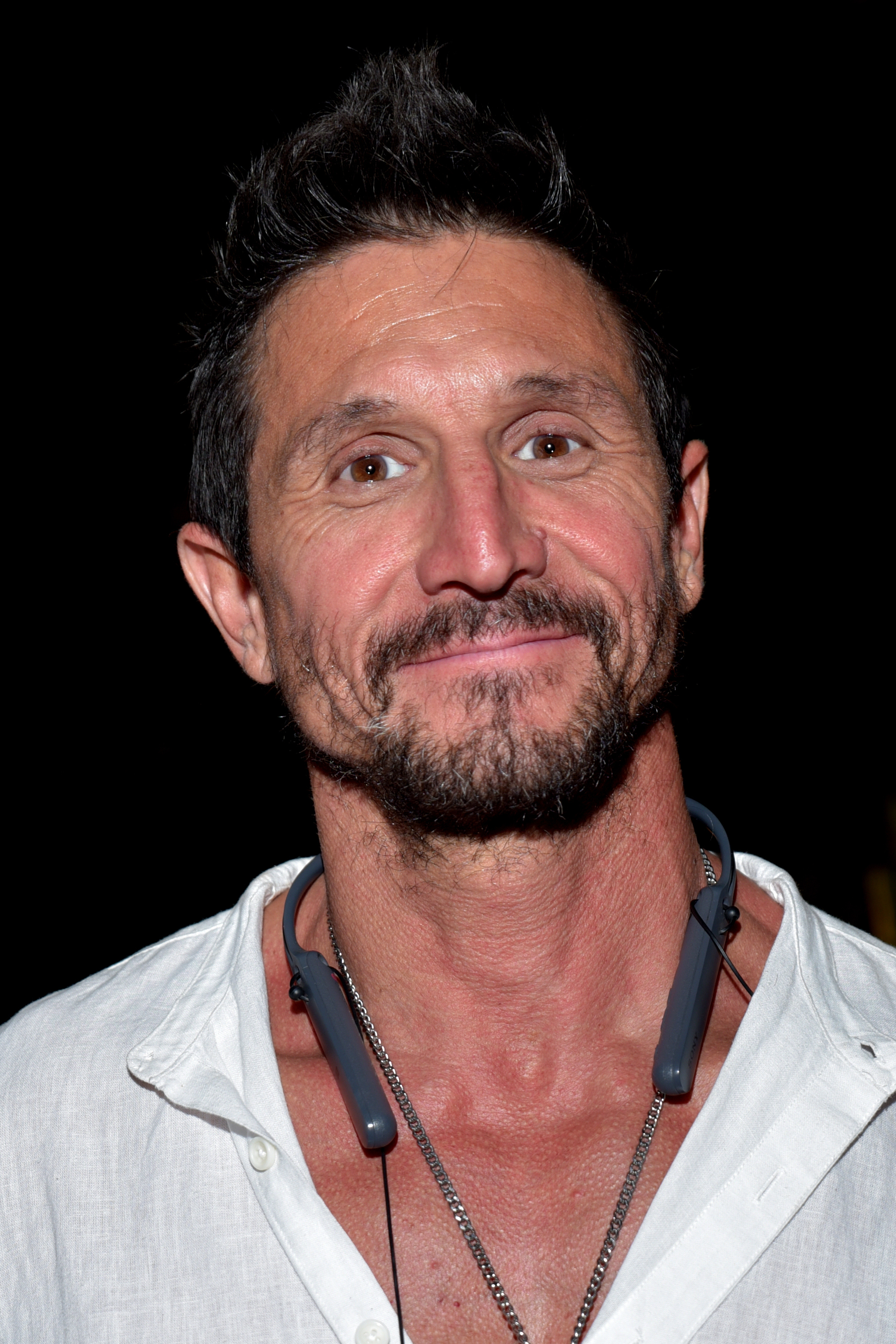
- Gunn in 2019
- Born: Thomas Joseph Strada; May 13, 1967 (age 59); Cherry Hill, New Jersey, U.S.
- Other names: Thomas Gunn, Tommy Gun
- Years active: 2004–present
- Height: 5 ft 8 in (1.73 m)
- Spouses: Shana Hiatt (divorced); Rita Faltoyano (m. 2005; div. 2008)

Thomas Joseph Strada (born May 13, 1967), better known by his stage name Tommy Gunn, is an American pornographic actor and director. He has made several mainstream appearances, including an episode of Entourage and music videos for Buckcherry and Rilo Kiley. In 2016, Gunn was inducted into the AVN Hall of Fame.

== Early life ==
In his early years, Tommy grew interested in sports, BMX bicycles, motorcycles, and soccer. Gunn was shy around girls until he noticed girls were interested in bigger and "buffer" guys, so he took up bodybuilding. He entered a "hot body" contest in a local bar, and although he lost the contest, a man offered him work as a stripper. For ten years, he worked as a dancer, traveling all over the world.

== Career ==
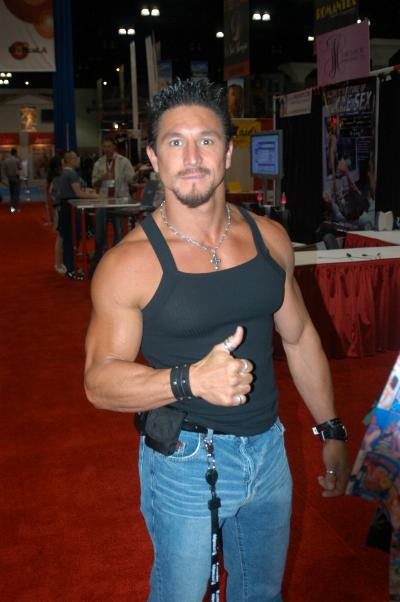
Gunn in 2007

Beginning his career in pornographic films in 2004, Gunn was soon recognized as the 2005 AVN Best Male Newcomer award. He likewise received the 2006 AVN Best Supporting Actor for his role in Pirates and a second AVN Male Performer of the Year for 2007.

In 2007, Gunn appeared in the music video for "The Moneymaker" by American indie rock band Rilo Kiley. He also appeared in the music video "Too Drunk" by the band Buckcherry. In 2010, Gunn appeared in an episode of Entourage. In 2011, he had an uncredited role in Mommy & Me, a comedy film, directed by Jennifer James. In 2012 he appeared in the Louis Theroux documentary Twilight of the porn stars discussing the porn industry and his personal experiences within it. In 2014, he appeared in the horror film Wolves, directed by David Hayter. He also had a small part in the 2017 movie Gangster land.

In 2009, Gunn directed and starred in a 3-D choose-your-own-adventure movie titled Cummin' At You 3D.

Gunn has appeared in over 3,400 videos in his pornographic career.

=== Business ventures ===
In February 2012, he launched his own underwear line.

Gunn appeared in an episode of the History Channel show, Pawn Stars, where he sold a zombie-proofed "zombie apocalypse" van for $11,000.

== Personal life ==
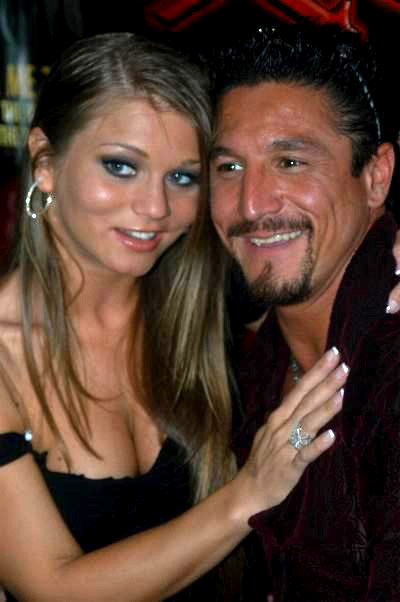
Gunn with Rita Faltoyano

Gunn's father is of Italian descent while his maternal grandfather was Chinese. He was married to porn actress Rita Faltoyano from 2005 to 2008. When asked during an August 2007 interview if there was a romance between him and fellow porn star Ashlynn Brooke, Gunn's reply was, "I think we are becoming something more." Gunn and Brooke have since ended their relationship.

== Awards and nominations ==
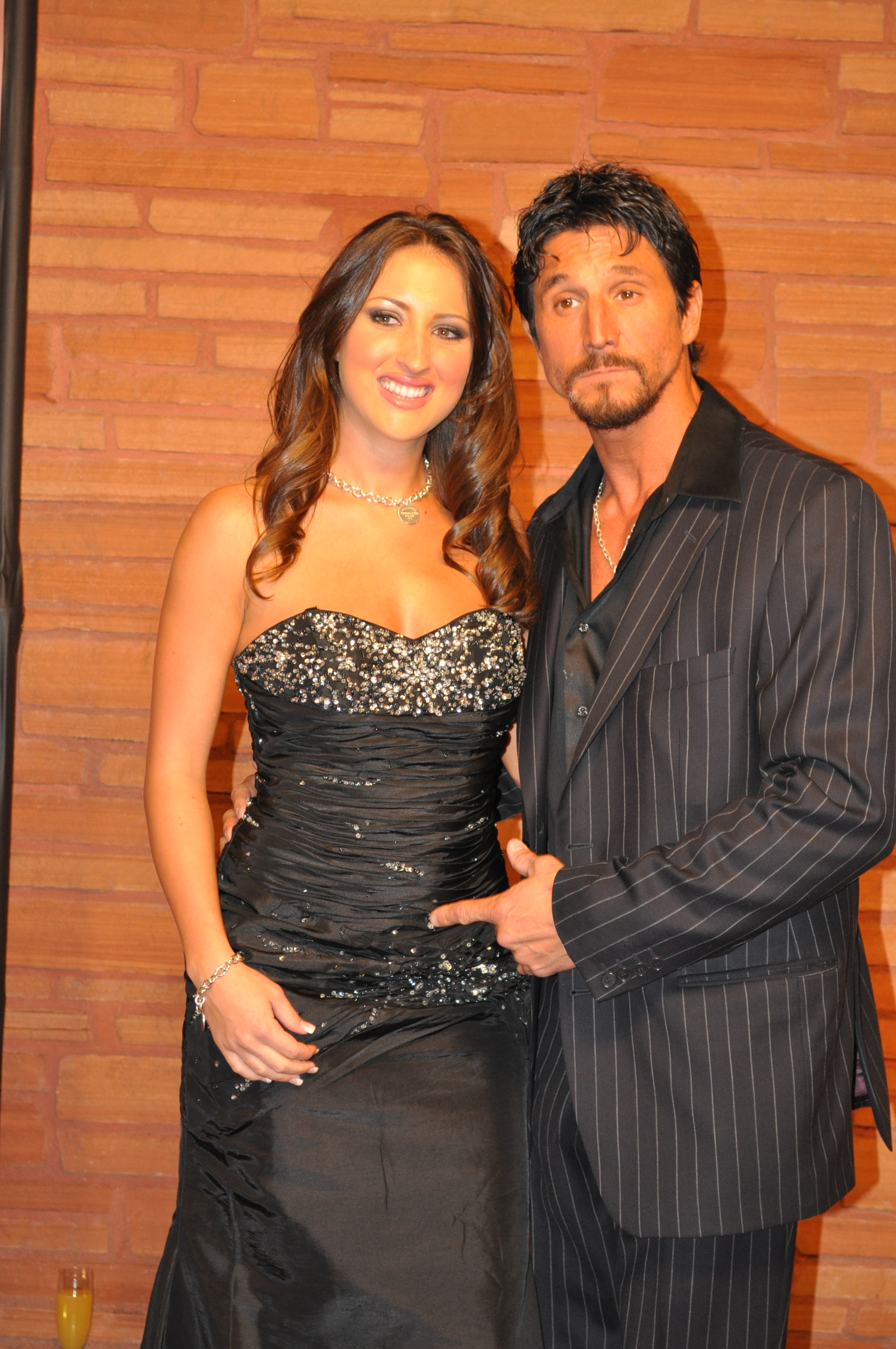
Gunn with Lizz Tayler in AVN Awards, 2011

List of accolades received by Tommy Gunn
Awards and nominations
Award	Won	Nominated
AVN Awards	4	42
XBIZ Awards	1	7
XRCO Awards	0	5
NightMoves Awards	4	0
F. A. M. E. Awards	0	3
Hot d'Or Awards	0	2
Other awards	1	0
- Total numbers of wins and nominations
Totals	10	59
- References

- 2005 AVN Award – Best Male Newcomer
- 2005 XRCO Award – New Stud
- 2006 AVN Award – Best Couples Sex Scene (Video) – Porn Star (with Brittney Skye)
- 2006 AVN Award – Best Supporting Actor (Video) – Pirates
- 2006 Eroticline Award – Best International Actor
- 2006 NightMoves Award – Best New Director (Fan's Choice)
- 2007 AVN Award – Best Group Sex Scene (Film) – FUCK (with Carmen Hart, Katsuni, Kirsten Price, Mia Smiles, Eric Masterson, Chris Cannon & Randy Spears)
- 2007 AVN Award – Best Oral Sex Scene (Film) – FUCK (with Ice LaFox, Eric Masterson, Marcus London & Mario Rossi)
- 2007 AVN Award – Best POV Sex Scene – Jack's POV 2 (with Naomi)
- 2007 AVN Award – Male Performer of the Year
- 2007 XRCO Award – Male Performer of the Year
- 2008 NightMoves Award – Best Male Performer (Fan's Choice)
- 2009 NightMoves Hall of Fame inductee
- 2011 NightMoves Award – Best Male Performer (Editor's Choice)
- 2011 XBIZ Award – Male Performer of the Year
- 2015 XBIZ Award – Best Scene - Couples-Themed Release – Untamed Heart (with Anikka Albrite)
- 2016 AVN Hall of Fame inductee
- 2018 XBIZ Award - Best Sex Scene — Vignette Release - Sacrosanct

=== AVN Awards ===
Year	Result	Category	Film
2005	Nominated	Best Group Sex Scene - Video (with Jessica Drake, Monica Sweetheart, Lezley Zen and Trevor Zen)	Eye of the Beholder
2006	Won	Best Sex Scene Coupling - Video (with Brittney Skye)	Porn Star
2006	Nominated	Best Sex Scene Coupling - Film (with Jessica Drake)	Sold
2006	Nominated	Best Oral Sex Scene - Film (with Jessica Drake, Brad Armstrong and Chris Cannon)	Sold
2006	Nominated	Best Actor - Video	AGP: All Girl Protection
2007	Won	Best Group Sex Scene - Film (with Carmen Hart, Katsumi, Kirsten Price, Mia Smiles, Eric Masterson, Chris Cannon and Randy Spears)	FUCK
2007	Nominated	Best Three-Way Sex Scene (with Nikita Denise and Sandra Romain)	Nikita’s Extreme Idols
2007	Nominated	Best Sex Scene Coupling - Film (with Monique Alexander)	To Die For
2007	Won	Best POV Sex Scene (with Naomi)	Jack’s POV 2
2007	Won	Best Oral Sex Scene - Film (with Eric Masterson, Marcus London and Mario Rossi)	FUCK
2007	Nominated	Best Anal Sex Scene - Video (with Sandra Romain)	Porno Revolution
2008	Nominated	Best Couples Sex Scene - Video (with Jayna Oso)	Zen
2008	Nominated	Best Couples Sex Scene - Film (with Tera Patrick)	Fashion Underground
2008	Nominated	Best Anal Sex Scene - Video (with Courtney Cummz)	Jack's Playground 34
2008	Nominated	Male Performer of the Year	—N/a
2008	Nominated	Best Supporting Actor - Video	Kill Jill
2009	Nominated	Male Performer Of The Year	—N/a
2009	Nominated	Best Supporting Actor	Pirates II: Stagnetti's Revenge
2009	Nominated	Best POV Sex Scene (with Stoya)	Jack's POV 9
2009	Nominated	Best POV Sex Scene (with Ashlynn Brooke)	Tommy Gunn: Point Blank POV
2009	Nominated	Best Group Sex Scene (with Shay Jordan, Alexis Texas, Camryn Kiss, James Deen and Johnny Sins)	Cheerleaders
2009	Nominated	Best Actor	Hearts and Minds II: Modern Warfare
2010	Nominated	Best Supporting Actor	This Ain't Happy Days XXX
2010	Nominated	Best POV Sex Scene (with Pure Play)	Cummin' at You 3D
2010	Nominated	Best Oral Sex Scene (with Pure Play)	Cummin' at You 3D
2010	Nominated	Best Actor	Heaven
2011	Nominated	Male Performer of the Year	—N/a
2011	Nominated	Crossover Star of the Year	—N/a
2011	Nominated	Best Group Sex Scene (with Julia Ann, Natasha Marley, BobbiStarr, Dylan Ryder, Paul Chaplin, Will Powers and Billy Glide)	Bonny & Clide
2011	Nominated	Best Couples Sex Scene (with Kayden Kross)	The Smiths
2011	Nominated	Best Actor	Rawhide 2: Dirty Deeds
2012	Nominated	Most Outrageous Sex Scene (with Jesse Jane)	Bad Girls 6
2012	Nominated	Male Performer of the Year	—N/a
2012	Nominated	Best Three-Way Sex Scene (G/B/B) (with Rebeca Linares and Scott Nails)	Bad Girls 5
2012	Nominated	Best Supporting Actor	Fighters
2012	Nominated	Best Group Sex Scene (with Alektra Blue, Jessica Drake, Kaylani Lei, Kirsten Price, Brandy Aniston, Nikki Daniels, Lucky Starr, Puma Swede, Randy Spears, Marcus London, Ron Jeremy, Jack Vegas, Dick Chibbles, Rocco Reed and Mac Turner)	The Rocki Whore Picture Show: A Hardcore Parody
2012	Nominated	Best Group Sex Scene (with Jesse Jane, Kayden Kross, Riley Steele, Stoya and Selena Rose)	Top Guns
2012	Nominated	Best Double Penetration Sex Scene (with Jack Vegas and Inari Vachs)	Harder
2013	Nominated	Best Supporting Actor	Spartacus MMXII: The Beginning
2014	Nominated	Best Boy/Girl Sex Scene (with Andy San Dimas)	Wolverine: An Axel Braun Parody
2014	Nominated	Best Double Penetration Sex Scene (with Ramon Nomar)	DP My Wife With Me 2
2014	Nominated	Best Safe Sex Scene (with Alexis Texas)	T&A
2014	Nominated	Best Supporting Actor	Meant to Be
2015	Nominated	Best Actor	American Hustle XXX Porn Parody
2015	Nominated	Best Group Sex Scene (with Lola Reve, Britney Amber, Lola Foxx, Anikka Albrite, Dahlia Sky, Abby Cross, Romi Rain, Alina Li, Kush Kush, Coco, Toni Ribas, Mick Blue, Alan Stafford, Keni Styles, Bill Bailey, Giovanni Francesco, Karlo Karrera and Richie Calhoun)	Orgy Initiation of Lola
2015	Nominated	Mainstream Star of the Year	—N/a

=== Eroticline Awards ===
Year	Result	Category	Film
2006	Won	Best International Actor	—N/a

=== F.A.M.E. Awards ===
Year	Result	Category	Film
2007	Nominated	Favorite Male Star	—N/a
2008	Nominated	Favorite Male Performer	—N/a
2009	Nominated	Favorite Male Star	—N/a

=== Hot d'Or ===
Year	Result	Category	Film
2009	Nominated	Best American Male Performer	—N/a
2009	Nominated	Best American Actor	Hearts and Minds 2: Modern Warfare

=== NightMoves Awards ===
Year	Result	Category	Film
2006	Won	Best New Director (Fan's Choice)	—N/a
2008	Won	Best Male Performer (Fan's Choice)	—N/a
2009	Won	Hall of Fame	—N/a
2011	Won	Best Male Performer (Editor's Choice)	—N/a

=== XBIZ Awards ===
Year	Result	Category	Film
2008	Nominated	Male Performer of the Year	—N/a
2009	Nominated	Male Performer of the Year	—N/a
2010	Nominated	Acting Performance of the Year - Male	This Aint Happy Days XXX
2011	Nominated	Acting Performance of the Year - Male	Rawhide 2: Dirty Deeds
2011	Nominated	Crossover Star of the Year	—N/a
2011	Won	Male Performer of the Year	—N/a
2012	Nominated	Supporting Acting Performance of the Year - Male	Top Guns
2012	Nominated	Male Performer of the Year	—N/a

=== XRCO Awards ===
Year	Result	Category	Film
2005	Nominated	Group Scene (with Jessica Drake, Lezley Zen and Monica Sweetheart)	Eye of the Beholder
2008	Nominated	Male Performer of the Year	—N/a
2009	Nominated	Single Performance – Actor	Hearts and Minds 2: Modern Warfare
2009	Nominated	Male Performer of the Year	—N/a
2011	Nominated	Best Actor	—N/a
