= Shifting Gears: A Bisexual Transmission =

- DVD cover with Cameron Marshall, Britney Amber, Shy Love and Lee Stephens
- Directed by: Chi Chi LaRue
- Written by: Chi Chi LaRue
- Produced by: Steven Walker
- Starring: Wolf Hudson; Blake Riley; Cameron Marshall; Shy Love; Lola; Johnny Hazzard; Britney Amber; Ryan Alexander; Krystal Kali; Cody Springs; Lee Stephens
- Cinematography: Adam Killian
- Edited by: Josh Eliot
- Music by: Redshag
- Distributed by: Channel 1 Releasing
- Release date: 2008
- Country: United States
- Language: English

Shifting Gears: A Bisexual Transmission (or more simply Shifting Gears) is a controversial GayVN Award winning bisexual pornographic film written and directed by Chi Chi LaRue and released by Channel 1 Releasing in 2008.

== Plot ==
The boss of a car shop (Wolf Hudson) is in dire need of a good mechanic to fix a broken down car. The shop is completely run by men, but a female mechanic named Billie (Krystal Kali) decides to apply after seeing a "help wanted" sign. The boss gives her a shot if she can fix broken down vehicle that all the other mechanics have not been able to fix. If accomplished she is hired, but if she does not, she must leave the premises and go out on a date with him. To the dismay of the men, she agrees to the challenge, as she is looking for a job. She gets the car started and stuns everyone with her skills and is immediately hired. All the mechanics make it difficult for her, especially one of the men (Cameron Marshall), play practical jokes and pranks to get her to leave. Cameron and Billie do not like each other, but there is strong tension between them. After catching each other watching the boss and his girlfriend (Lola) engaging in sex inside the office, they become friendly with one another. The next time the guys start trouble with Billie, Cameron jumps in to defend her and tell all of them to leave her alone. The film ends with Cameron and Billie falling in love and embracing each other with a kiss. The climactic scene of the movie involved a bisexual orgy that all the actors participate in, a scene that took seven hours to film.

The film stars Blake Riley, Cameron Marshall, Wolf Hudson, Johnny Hazzard, Shy Love, Lola, Lee Stephens, Krystal Kali, Britney Amber, Cody Springs and Ryan Alexander.

== Cast ==
- Ryan Alexander
- Britney Amber
- Johnny Hazzard
- Wolf Hudson
- Krystal Kali
- Shy Love
- Lola
- Cameron Marshall
- Cody Springs
- Lee Stephens
- Josh Vaughn

== Controversy ==
Shifting Gears sparked controversy in August 2008, when its official press release coined the term "straight-for-pay", a play on "gay-for-pay", to refer to the film's well-known gay stars appearing in heterosexual scenarios for the first time. Blake Riley's scene with Shy Love was reportedly his first sexual encounter with a woman, which he later said he enjoyed. Unapologetic about it, Riley jokingly boasted, "I fucked a girl and I liked it", to the tune of Katy Perry's song "I Kissed a Girl". He added that he was totally comfortable during his heterosexual pairings and had no problems maintaining an erection. These comments drew heavy criticism from Riley's gay fans. He fueled the controversy in an October 2008 Randy Blue performance in which he stated he was open to doing another bisexual film and revealed that his ultimate sexual fantasy was to be penetrated by a female wearing a strap-on.

An interviewer with the gay newspaper Between the Lines implied that Cameron Marshall performed heterosexual sex well enough in Shifting Gears that it seemed like Marshall had had sex with women before, commenting "you have sex with a chick. You looked like you had done it before". In response, Marshall stated that he had had sex with women because he dated women and had girlfriends until he was 20, before switching over to dating men exclusively. Having entered gay porn at age 20 and having made Shifting Gears at age 22, it had been 2 years since Marshall had had sex with a woman. At the time of filming Shifting Gears Marshall considered himself to be gay because, although he lost his virginity to a woman and had fun dating women, he was now "over it" and only dated men.

In response to the controversy, Chi Chi LaRue defended the film as a work of art, praising Blake Riley's performance and saying that the film was more authentically bisexual than most bisexual porn.

I would say probably the biggest standout in this movie was Blake Riley, who has never been with a girl in his life. Blake fucks Shy and Brittany, and also fucks the lovely Ms. Amber while also getting fucked by Ryan Alexander's big dick. Delish! I know all the complaints about bi porn in the past. Fans would always complain about how the sex wasn't authentically bisexual with just one lesbian scene, one gay scene, one straight scene. Sometimes it worked out that way, but this movie is very bisexual. Just wait until you see that huge orgy. Everyone does everything to everyone. They sell and sell and sell. Not huge numbers all at once, but very consistently over time. I was looking at the numbers for my older bi movies like Mile Bi Club and Fly Bi Night and was really surprised at how many units we'd moved. I knew it was time for another one.

== Reception ==
Writing for Gawker Media's Fleshbot, Brian O'Brien praised the film stating that while the movie had a "cheesy theme" it was also "incredibly revolutionary". O'Brien further stated that the film's depiction of "a place where there are no sexual orientations" was a good thing because it gave gay men something different to watch and that watching heterosexual sex scenes could cause gay men to question their sexuality by thinking, "Hmm, that looks fun. Maybe we should try it." Another "Fleshbot" author approved of the "fabulously perverse" film because it "gets the gays to try something new" and described the film's plot of gay men having sex with women as "perverse hotness", making the point that gay men "chuckle every time we see the pendulum swinging the other way" if straight men try homosexual sex, so there is nothing wrong with gay men trying heterosexual sex.

== Awards and nominations ==
Shifting Gears won the 2009 GayVN Award for Best Bisexual Film. Wolf Hudson was nominated for Best Supporting Actor, becoming the first male performer to be nominated in that category for a bisexual film at the GayVN Awards. It also received a Grabby Awards nomination for Best Art Direction, a first for a bisexual film in that category. Johnny Hazzard was nominated for Best Supporting Actor, becoming the first male performer to be nominated in that category for a bisexual film at the Grabby Awards.

Year	Award	Category	Winner/Nominee	Result
2009	GayVN Awards	Best Bisexual Film	Channel 1 Releasing	Won
2009	GayVN Awards	Best Supporting Actor	Wolf Hudson	Nominated
2009	Grabby Awards	Best Art Direction	Channel 1 Releasing	Nominated
2009	Grabby Awards	Best Supporting Actor	Johnny Hazzard	Nominated

== See also ==
- Bisexual pornography
- List of gay porn stars
