= Fashionistas (film) =

2002 American film directed by John Stagliano

The Fashionistas
- U.S. DVD cover art
- Directed by: John Stagliano
- Written by: John Stagliano
- Produced by: John Stagliano; Tricia Devereaux
- Starring: Rocco Siffredi; Belladonna; Taylor St. Claire; Chelsea Blue; Manuel Ferrara
- Cinematography: Don Crane
- Edited by: John Stagliano
- Music by: Javier; John Further; Mistress Minx; DJ Uneasy
- Production company: Evil Angel Productions
- Distributed by: Evil Angel Video
- Release date: October 1, 2002
- Running time: 276 minutes
- Country: United States
- Budget: $500,000

The Fashionistas is a 2002 pornographic film directed by John Stagliano and produced by Evil Angel Productions. Shot on 35 mm film, it was a high-budget production (with a budget of about $500,000), with a length of over four and a half hours. The film was a commercial success, selling over 100,000 copies just in its first month of release. In 2003, it set the record for most AVN Award nominations for a single title — 22.

Fashionistas also marks the American debut of Manuel Ferrara. The film has had two sequels, Fashionistas Safado: The Challenge and Fashionistas Safado: Berlin, both still directed by Stagliano. Siffredi, Belladonna and Ferrara reprised their roles in the sequels, which also starred Katsuni and Nacho Vidal.

== Plot ==
The Fashionistas are an up-and-coming group of fetish fashion designers led by Helena (Taylor St. Claire) and based in the Fashion District of Los Angeles. The group is trying to land a deal with Italian fetish fashion designer Antonio (Rocco Siffredi). Antonio, who recently divorced amid highly publicized rumors of extramarital affairs, arrives in Los Angeles in search of an s/m-influenced house to partner with. In order to grab Antonio's attention, the Fashionistas crash his fashion show. Helena wants Antonio to believe she is the creative force behind the Fashionistas, even though it is actually Jesse (Belladonna), her assistant. Jesse also engages in a triangular relation with Helena and Antonio.

== Awards and nominations ==
Accolades received by The Fashionistas
Awards & nominations
Award	Won	Nominated
AFW Awards	9	0
AVN Awards	12	15
Empire Awards	3	0
Ninfa Awards	2	6
XRCO Awards	8	2
- Total number of wins and nominations
Totals	34	23
- References

Year	Ceremony	Result	Category	Recipient(s)
2003	AFW Award	Won	Best Film	—N/a
2003	AFW Award	Won	Best Director – Film	John Stagliano
2003	AFW Award	Won	Best Actress – Film	Taylor St. Claire
2003	AFW Award	Won	Best Supporting Actress – Film	Belladonna
2003	AFW Award	Won	Best Sex Scene - Film	Taylor St. Claire & Rocco Siffredi
2003	AFW Award	Won	Best All-Girl Sex Scene - Film	Belladonna & Taylor St. Claire
2003	AFW Award	Won	Best Anal Sex Scene - Film	Kate Frost & Rocco Siffredi
2003	AFW Award	Won	Best Group Sex Scene	—N/a
2003	AVN Award	Won	Best Film	—N/a
2003	AVN Award	Won	Best Director – Film	John Stagliano
2003	AVN Award	Nominated	Best Actor – Film	Rocco Siffredi
2003	AVN Award	Won	Best Actress – Film	Taylor St. Claire
2003	AVN Award	Nominated	Best Supporting Actor – Film	Manuel Ferrara
2003	AVN Award	Won	Best Supporting Actress – Film	Belladonna
2003	AVN Award	Nominated	Best Supporting Actress – Film	Caroline Pierce
2003	AVN Award	Won	Best Tease Performance	Belladonna
2003	AVN Award	Nominated	Best Tease Performance	Chelsea Blue, Gia, & Taylor St. Claire
2003	AVN Award	Nominated	Best Box Cover Concept	—N/a
2003	AVN Award	Won	Best All-Girl Sex Scene - Film	Belladonna & Taylor St. Claire
2003	AVN Award	Won	Best Anal Sex Scene - Film	Kate Frost & Rocco Siffredi
2003	AVN Award	Won	Best Oral Sex Scene - Film	Belladonna & Rocco Siffredi
2003	AVN Award	Nominated	Best Oral Sex Scene – Film	Belladonna, Mark Ashley & Billy Glide
2003	AVN Award	Nominated	Best Sex Scene Coupling – Film	Caroline Pierce & Manuel Ferrara
2003	AVN Award	Nominated	Best Sex Scene Coupling – Film	Taylor St. Claire & Rocco Siffredi
2003	AVN Award	Won	Best Group Sex Scene - Film	Friday, Taylor St. Claire, Sharon Wild & Rocco Siffredi
2003	AVN Award	Nominated	Best Screenplay – Film	John Stagliano
2003	AVN Award	Nominated	Best Art Direction - Film	Jim Malibu
2003	AVN Award	Nominated	Best Cinematography	John Stagliano
2003	AVN Award	Won	Best Editing - Film	Tricia Devereaux & John Stagliano
2003	AVN Award	Nominated	Best Music	John Further, Javier, Mistress Minx & DJ Uneasy
2003	Ninfa Award	Nominated	Best Anal Sequence	—N/a
2003	Ninfa Award	Nominated	Best Sex Sequence	—N/a
2003	Ninfa Award	Nominated	Best Script	—N/a
2003	Ninfa Award	Won	Best Cinematographic Values	—N/a
2003	Ninfa Award	Nominated	Best Actor	Rocco Siffredi
2003	Ninfa Award	Won	Best Actress	Belladonna
2003	Ninfa Award	Nominated	Best Director	John Stagliano
2003	Ninfa Award	Nominated	Best Film	John Stagliano
2003	XRCO Award	Won	Best Group Sex Scene	Friday, Taylor St. Claire, Sharon Wild & Rocco Siffredi
2003	XRCO Award	Won	Best Actor	Rocco Siffredi
2003	XRCO Award	Won	Best Actress	Belladonna
2003	XRCO Award	Won	Best Girl/Girl Sex Scene	Belladonna & Taylor St. Claire
2003	XRCO Award	Won	Best Male/Female Sex Scene	Taylor St. Claire & Rocco Siffredi
2003	XRCO Award	Won	Film of the Year	—N/a
2003	XRCO Award	Nominated	Single Performance, Actress	Taylor St. Claire
2003	XRCO Award	Nominated	Sex Scene of the Year	Belladonna & Rocco Siffredi
2004	AFW Award	Won	Best DVD	—N/a
2004	AVN Award	Won	Best DVD	—N/a
2004	AVN Award	Won	Best Renting Title of the Year	—N/a
2004	AVN Award	Nominated	Best DVD Extras	—N/a
2004	AVN Award	Nominated	Best DVD Menus	—N/a
2004	AVN Award	Nominated	Best DVD Packaging	—N/a
2004	Empire Award	Won	Best Overall DVD	—N/a
2004	Empire Award	Won	Best Feature DVD	—N/a
2004	Empire Award	Won	Best DVD Audio Quality	—N/a
2004	XRCO Award	Won	Best DVD	—N/a
2013	XRCO Award	Won	XRCO Hall of Fame	—N/a

== Live show ==
There was also a theatrical dance show based on the film called The Fashionistas Live Show at the Krave nightclub at The Aladdin in Las Vegas. The show ran from October 12, 2004, to February 28, 2008, and won the 'AVN Special Achievement Award' in 2006.
