= Shy Love =

American actress

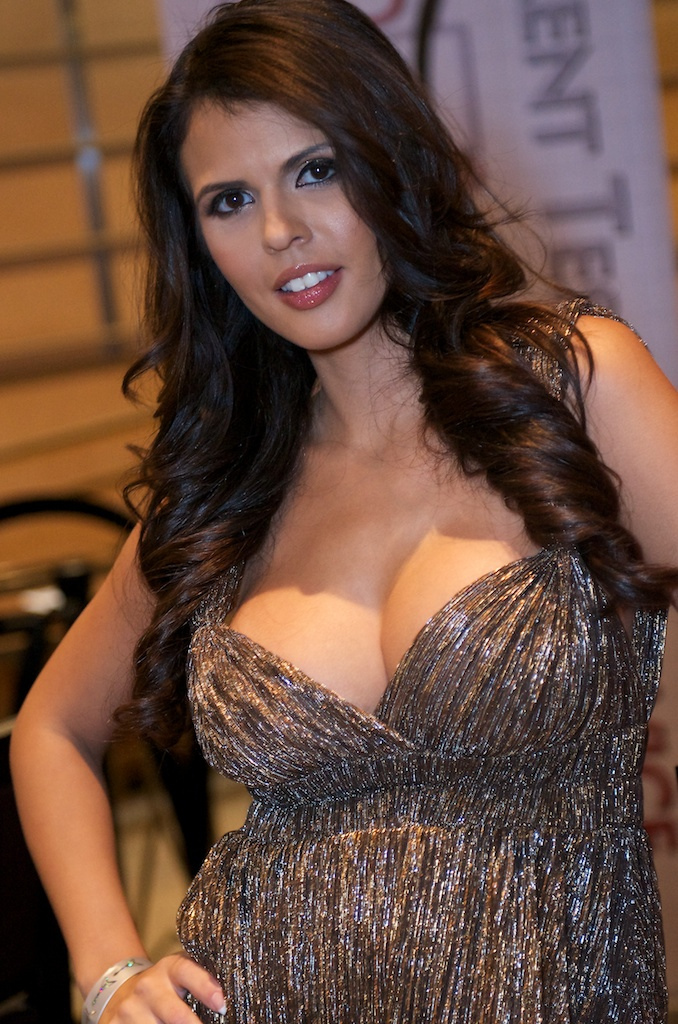
- Shy Love in 2012
- Born: November 27, 1978 (age 47); New Haven, Connecticut, U.S.
- Other name: Shy Luv
- Occupation: Pornographic actress
- Height: 5 ft 5 in (1.65 m)
- Website: moneylovesuccess.com

Sheelagh Blumberg (born November 27, 1978), known professionally as Shy Love and Shy Luv, is an American pornographic actress, of Italian and Puerto Rican descent. She has been active in the porn industry since 2003.

== Early life ==
Love was raised in New Haven, Connecticut. She has stated that she is a certified public accountant and "holds a bachelor’s degree and two master’s degrees".

== Personal life ==
In a 2007 interview with GameLink, she said her relationship with her husband was only the third real relationship with a man she had ever had, and that she likes to play with other women. She has two children.

== Career ==
She is part-owner of a nightclub in Colorado Springs called 13 Pure that she opened in January 2008.

== Talent agencies ==
=== Adult Talent Managers ===
In 2006 Love established her own talent agency, Adult Talent Managers, and signed Memphis Monroe and Lisa Daniels as contract girls. She has said that her agency's representation of gay men in addition to women is unique in the industry. In 2010, Love merged her company with another talent agency, A List Talent, to create a single agency with both adult and mainstream branches. Then in 2013, she sold her interest in the company.

== Awards and nominations ==
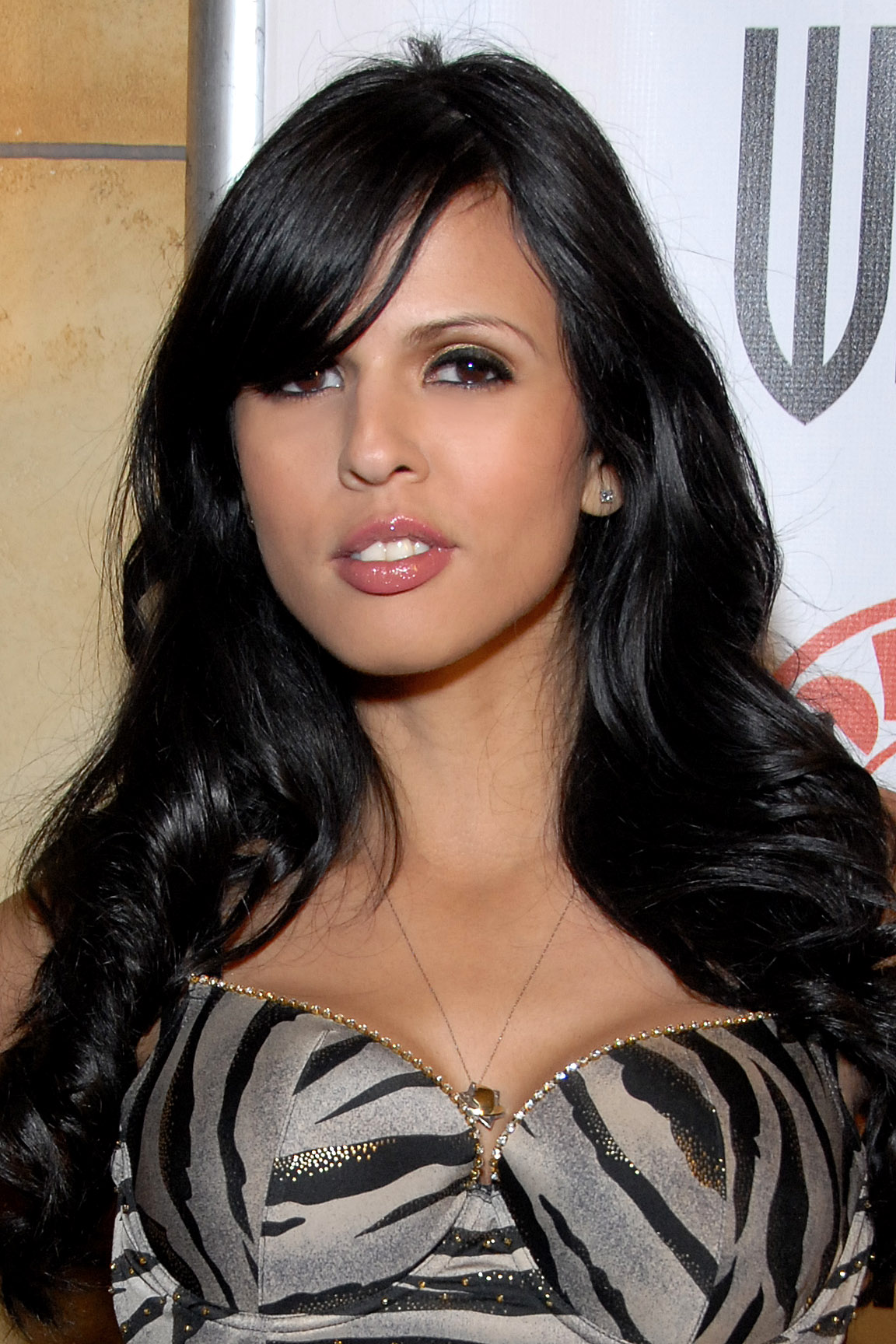
Shy Love attending the XCRO Awards, Hollywood, CA on April 16, 2009

| Year | Ceremony | Category | Work | Result |
|---|---|---|---|---|
| 2006 | AVN Award | Best Group Sex Scene – Film (with Lisa Lee, Lucy Lee, Lisa Marie, Haley Paige, Tyla Winn, Jerry, Marco Duato, Nick Manning, Steven St. Croix, & Jean Valjean) | Scorpio Rising | Nominated |
| 2006 | AVN Award | Best Interactive DVD | Shy Love’s Cum Play With Me | Nominated |
| 2006 | XRCO Award | Best On-Screen Couple (with Monique Alexander) | Janine's Got Male | Nominated |
| 2007 | AVN Award | Female Performer of the Year | —N/a | Nominated |
| 2007 | Adultcon Award | Top 20 Adult Actresses | —N/a | Won |
| 2013 | AVN Award | AVN Hall of Fame | —N/a | Won |
| 2013 | AVN Award | Best Director – Parody | El Gordo Y La Flaca XXX | Nominated |
| 2013 | XBIZ Award | Director of the Year – Parody | El Gordo Y La Flaca XXX | Nominated |
