= Carmen Hart =

American pornographic film actress (born 1983/1984)

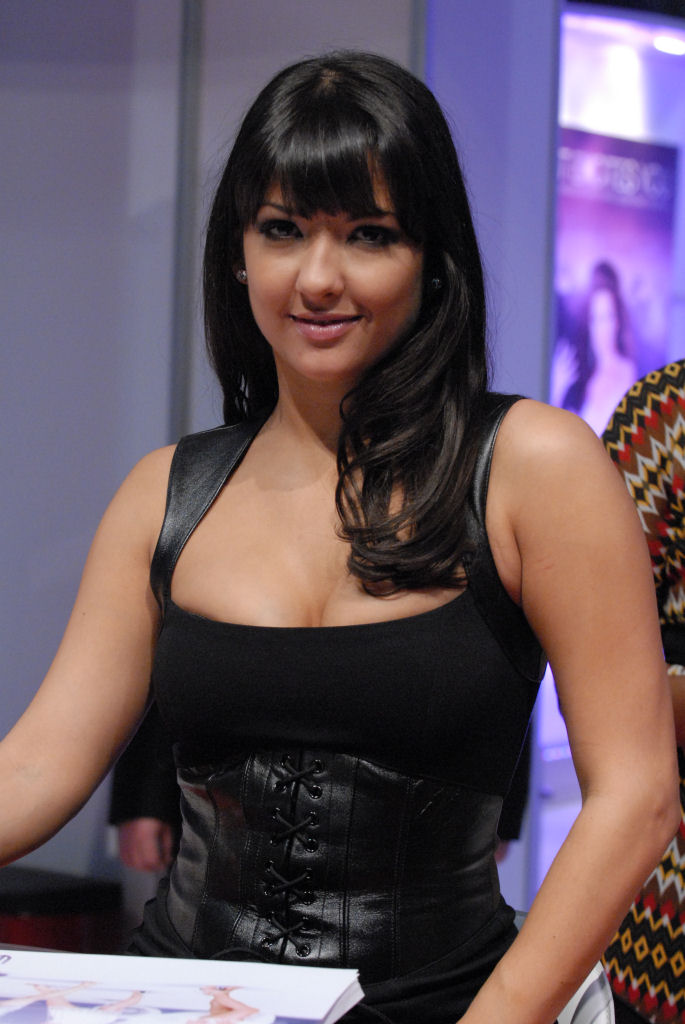
- Hart in 2008
- Born: 1983 or 1984 (age 41–42)
- Occupations: Pornographic film actress; exotic dancer

Carmen Hart (born 1983 or 1984) is an American pornographic film actress and exotic dancer native to North Carolina.

== Career ==
In October 2005, Hart signed on as a contract performer with Wicked Pictures for two years. Over the course of her adult industry career, Hart continued to be featured as a dancer in men's clubs as well as appear at modeling shows and conventions in the United States and abroad.

=== Appearances ===
In March 2007 Hart made an appearance at the 56th Annual Miss USA Pageant at the Hollywood Kodak Theatre. She was the current Miss Exotic International title holder and watched as controversial Miss USA 2006 Tara Conner crowned her successor, Rachel Smith. Hart was also spotted with celebrity judge Vanessa Minnillo and event producer Donald Trump. Later she made a guest appearance on the Los Angeles-based syndicated KROQ FM radio show Loveline.

In May 2007 Hart was featured on the cover of Strip Las Vegas magazine. Later in November Hart was featured along with pornographic film actress Tera Patrick in the 100th issue of GlamorGirl magazine.

== Awards and nominations ==
=== Awards ===
- 2007 AVN Award – Best Group Sex Scene, Film – Fuck
- 2007 Adam Film World Guide Award – Contract Starlet of the Year – Wicked Pictures
- 2007 Venus Award – Best International Newcomer
- 2007 Adultcon – Top 20 Adult Actresses

=== Nominations ===
- 2007 AVN Award – Best Supporting Actress, Film – Manhunters
- 2008 AVN Award – Best Actress – Video – Just Between Us
- 2008 XBIZ Award – Female Performer of the Year
- 2009 AVN Award – Best Actress – Fired
