= 28th AVN Awards =

US adult industry award ceremony in 2011

- Date: January 8, 2011
- Site: Pearl Theater; Palms Casino Resort; Paradise, Nevada
- Hosted by: Lisa Lampanelli; Tori Black; Riley Steele
- Preshow hosts: Dave Navarro; Jesse Jane; Kirsten Price; Kayden Kross
- Produced by: Gary Miller; Jeff Roe
- Directed by: Gary Miller

Highlights
- Best Picture: Speed (Best Feature)
- Most awards: Batman XXX: A Porn Parody (7)
- Most nominations: Malice in Lalaland (19)

Television coverage
- Network: Showtime
- Duration: 1 hour, 50 minutes

The 28th AVN Awards ceremony in Las Vegas, presented by Adult Video News (AVN), honored the best pornographic movies and adult entertainment products of 2010. The ceremony was held on January 8, 2011, in the Pearl Concert Theater inside the Palms Casino Resort in Paradise, Nevada. During the ceremony, AVN Media Network presented awards in 155 categories of movies or products released between October 1, 2009, and September 30, 2010. The ceremony was televised in the United States by Showtime. Comedian Lisa Lampanelli hosted the show with co-hosts Tori Black and Riley Steele.

AVN increased the number of people who voted on the awards to more than forty, "roughly divided evenly between in-house AVN editors, freelancers and outside critics" by adding "Xcitement Magazine's Cindi Loftus, Genesis Magazine's Dan Davis, RogReviews.com's Roger Pipe, DrunkenStepfather.com's Drunken Stepfather, Theresa “Darklady” Reed, former AVN editors Tod Hunter and Jared Rutter, XCritic.com's Christopher Thorne, Dr. Jay and Don Houston, members of AdultDVDTalk.com and others."

Fan awards were also introduced in 2011. Winners were determined by voting two weeks before the show. Fans were able to vote in four categories: Favorite Performer, Favorite Body, Favorite Movie, and Wildest Sex Scene.

Speed earned Best Feature honors for Brad Armstrong who also took home the Best Director—Feature award. Tori Black won her second Female Performer of the Year award, the first actress to do so in the event's 28-year history, while Gracie Glam won the Best New Starlet Award. Evan Stone became a three-time Male Performer of the Year, joining Manuel Ferrara and Lexington Steele as the two others with three wins in the category.

== Winners and nominees ==
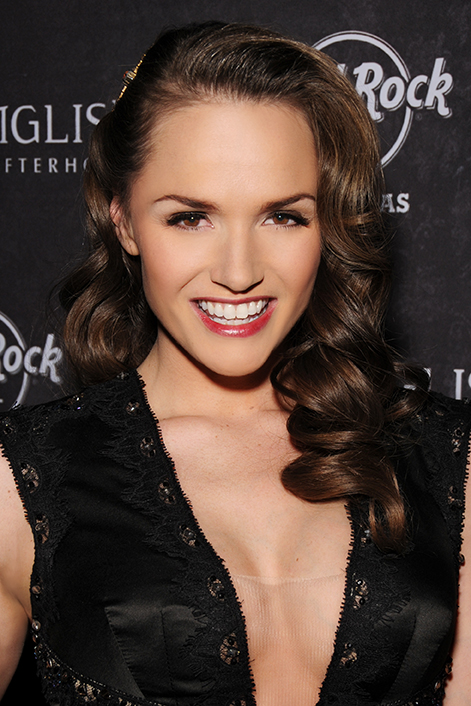
Tori Black, winner of the 2011 AVN Female Performer of the Year Award

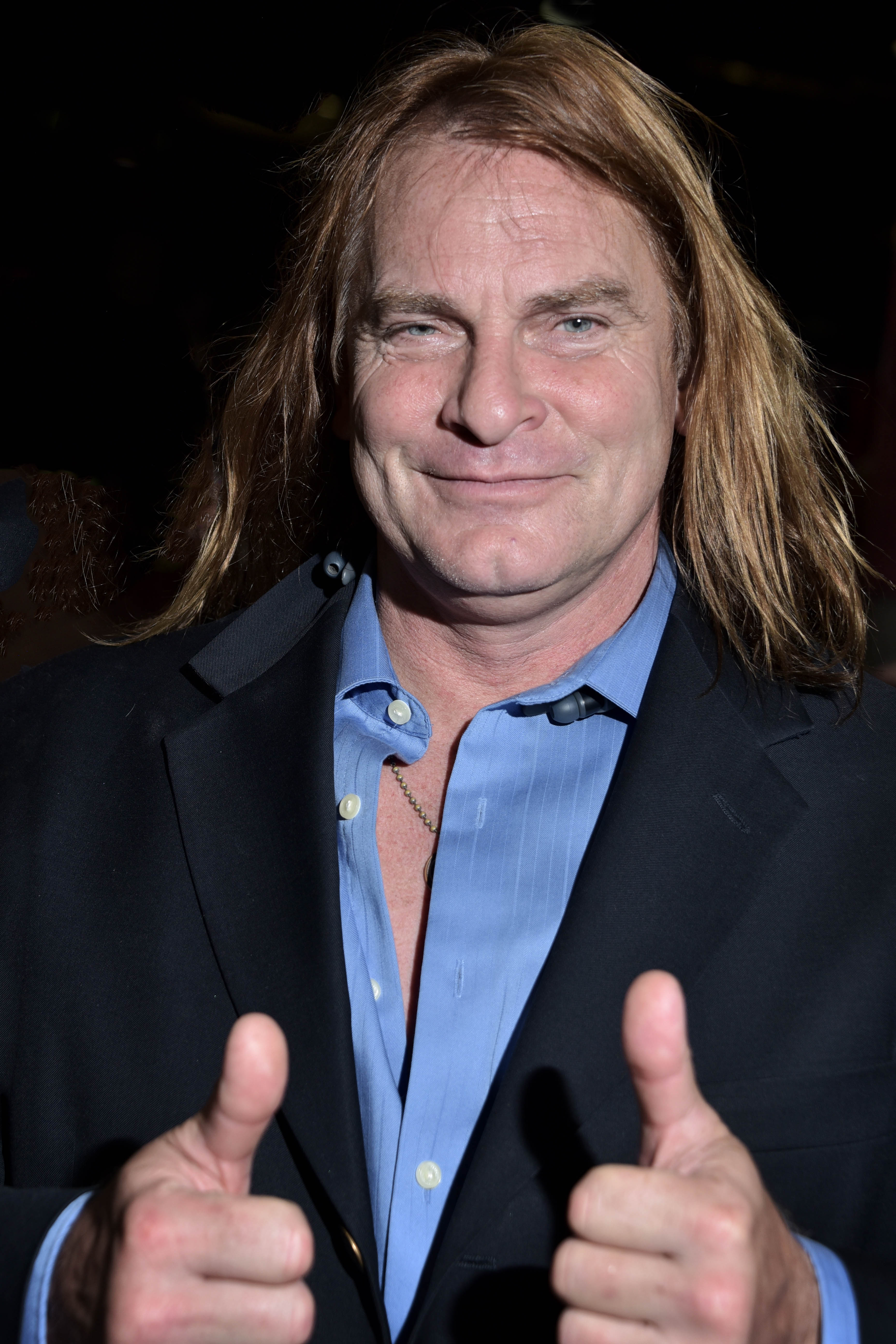
Evan Stone, winner of the 2011 AVN Male Performer of the Year

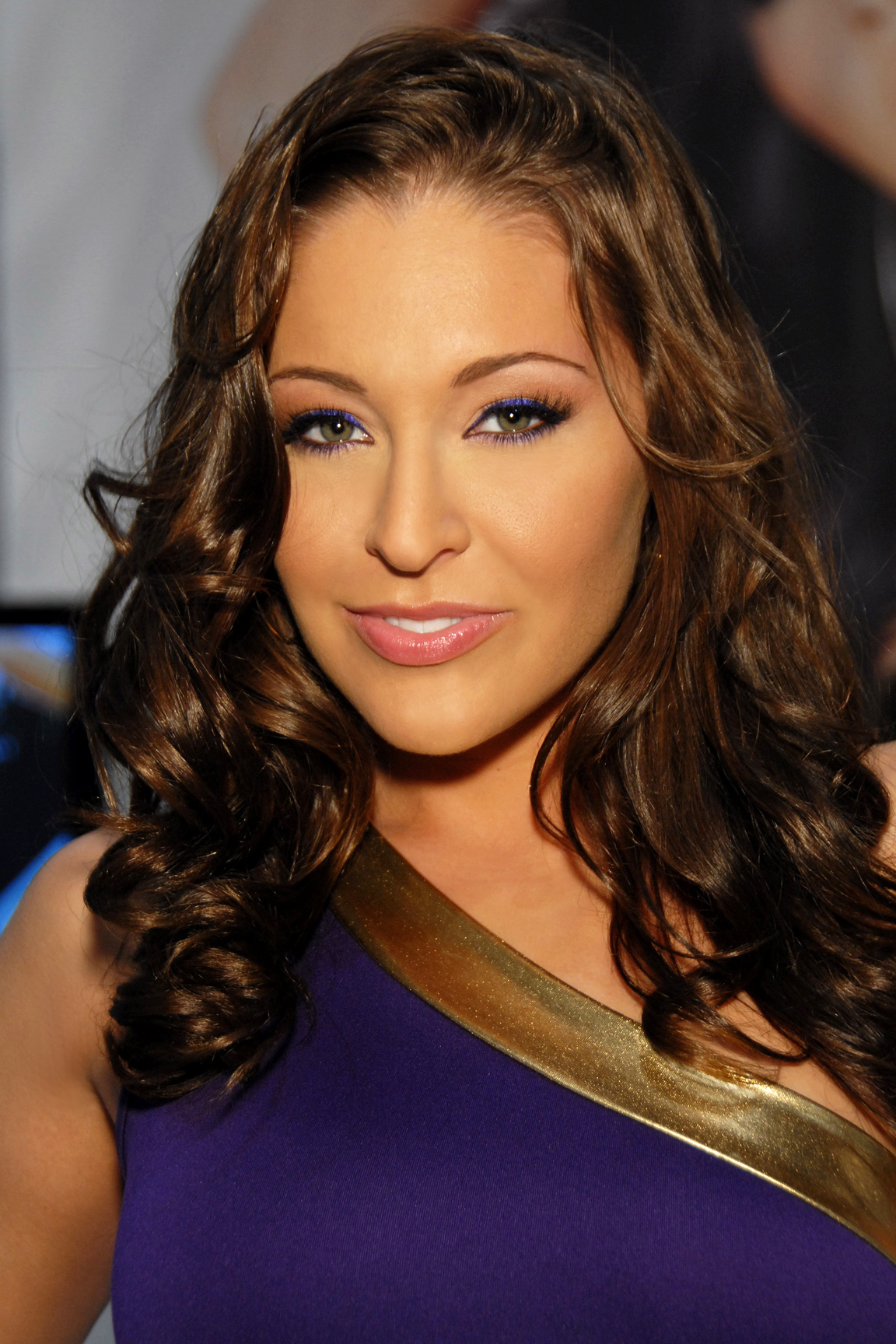
Gracie Glam, winner of the 2011 AVN Best New Starlet Award

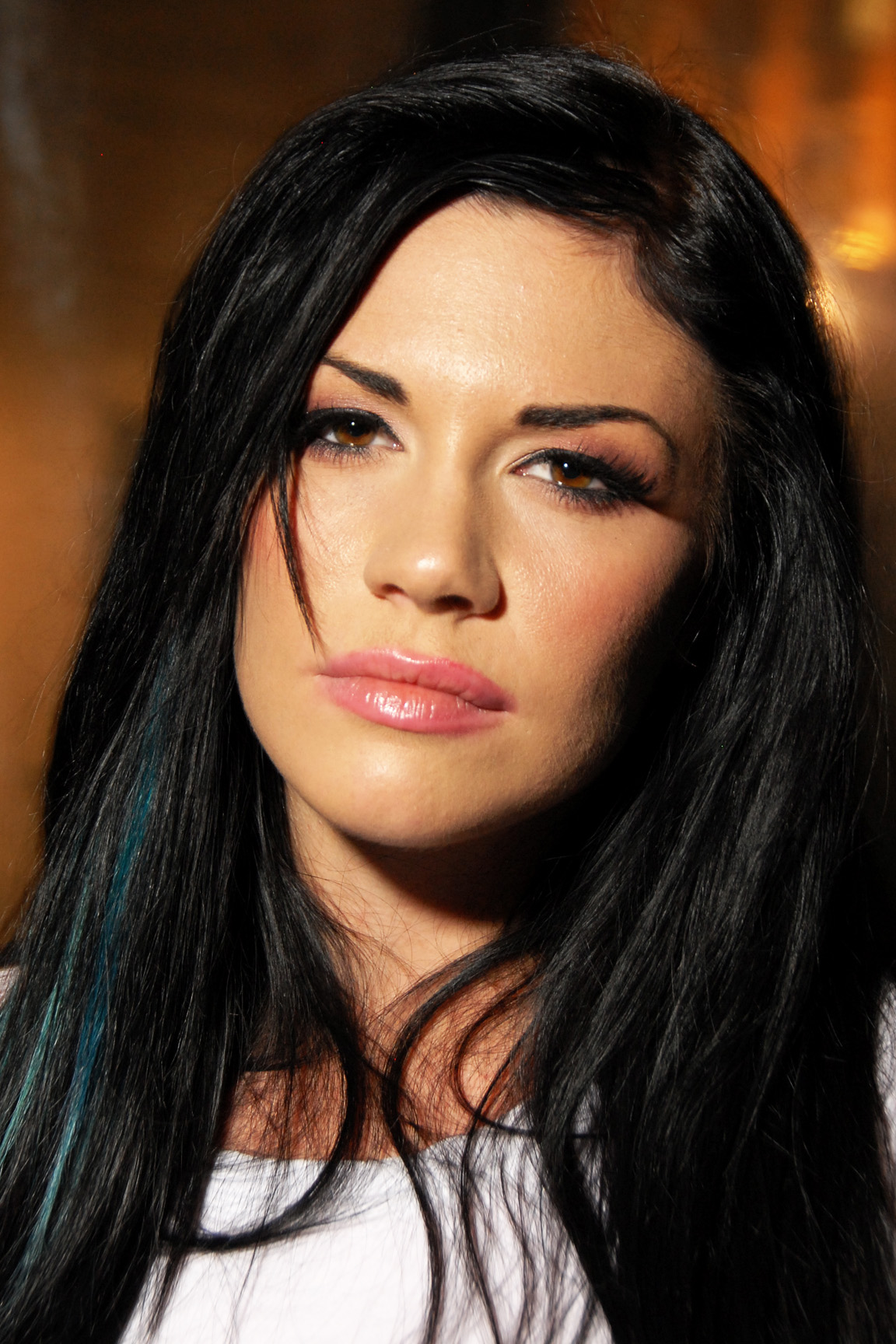
Andy San Dimas tied for Best Actress with India Summer

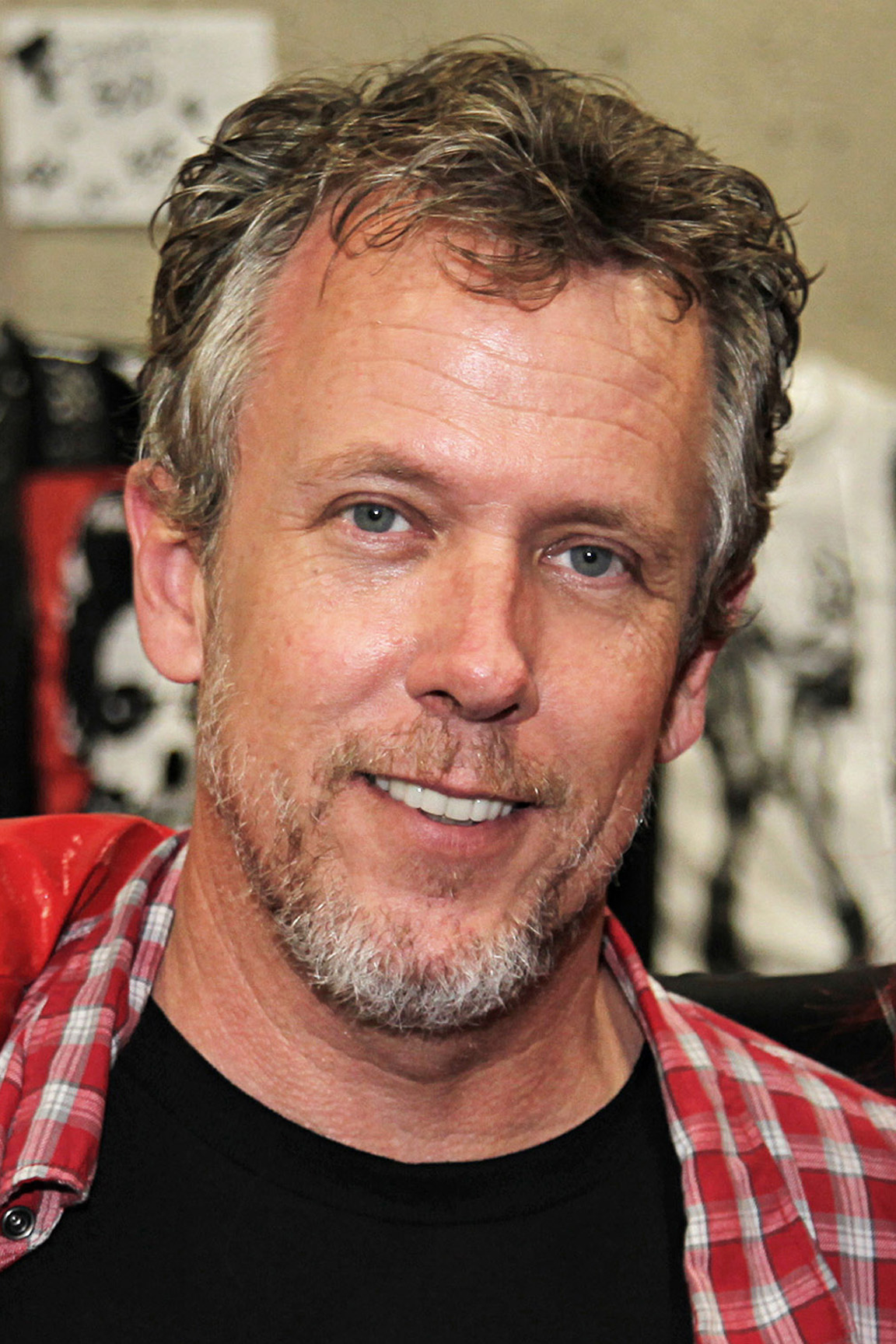
Tom Byron, winner of the 2011 Best Actor

The nominees for the 28th AVN Awards were announced on November 29, 2010 in a press release. The film receiving the most nominations was Malice in Lalaland with 19, while performer Tori Black had the most individual nominations with 22, an AVN Awards record. The winners were announced during the awards ceremony on January 8, 2011, which were taped for broadcast April 7 on Showtime.

=== Major Awards ===
Award winners are listed first and highlighted in boldface.

Best Feature	Best New Starlet
**Speed**; 3 Days in June; Awakening to Love; Body Heat; The Condemned; The Devil in Miss Jones: The Resurrection; Fatally Obsessed; Gigolos; Malice in Lalaland; An Open Invitation: A Real Swinger's Party in San Francisco; Pornstar Superheroes; Rawhide 2: Dirty Deeds; Sanatorium; Scorned; Whatever It Takes	**Gracie Glam**; Brooke Lee Adams; Raven Alexis; Briana Blair; Amy Brooke; Danica Dillan; Alexis Ford; Tara Lynn Foxx; Allie Haze; Amia Miley; Mallory Rae Murphy; Chanel Preston; Ashlyn Rae; Katie St. Ives; Jennifer White
Male Performer of the Year	Female Performer of the Year
**Evan Stone**; Mick Blue; Tom Byron; James Deen; Erik Everhard; Manuel Ferrara; Tommy Gunn; Keiran Lee; Mr. Marcus; Scott Nails; Mr. Pete; Anthony Rosano; Keni Styles; Prince Yahshua	**Tori Black**; Asa Akira; Monique Alexander; Lexi Belle; Jenna Haze; Kagney Linn Karter; Kimberly Kane; Kayden Kross; Faye Reagan; Kristina Rose; Andy San Dimas; Bobbi Starr; Riley Steele; Misty Stone; Alexis Texas
Best Actor	Best Actress
**Tom Byron - The Big Lebowski: A XXX Parody**; Chad Alva - The Breakfast Club: A XXX Parody; Brad Armstrong - 4Some; Paul Chaplin - BatfXXX: Dark Night Parody; Cheyne Collins - The Vampire Sex Diaries; Dane Cross - 3 Days in June; Dale DaBone - Batman XXX: A Porn Parody; Chad Diamond - This Ain't Glee XXX; Ben English - The Condemned; Tommy Gunn - Rawhide 2: Dirty Deeds; Jack Lawrence - Reno 911: A XXX Parody; Mr. Marcus - Savanna's Been Blackmaled 2; Tommy Pistol - Joanna's Angels 3; Rock: The Icon - Fatally Obsessed	**Andy San Dimas - This Ain't Glee XXX**; **India Summer - An Open Invitation: A Real Swinger's Party in San Francisco**; Nyomi Banxxx - Fatally Obsessed; Tori Black - Whatever It Takes; Ashlynn Brooke - WKRP in Cincinnati: A XXX Parody; Stormy Daniels - Partly Stormy; Jessica Drake - 3 Days in June; Penny Flame - Real Wife Stories 6; Roxanne Hall - Scorned; Nikki Jayne - The Condemned; Kimberly Kane - The Sex Files 2: A Dark XXX Parody; Kayden Kross - The Perfect Secretary: Training Day; Sunny Lane - Alice; Sunny Leone - Gia: Portrait of a Porn Star; Lia - The Rush; Natasha Marley - Bonny & Clide; Samantha Ryan - Awakening to Love; Riley Steele - Love Fool; Misty Stone - A Love Triangle; Stoya - Stoya: Perfect Picture
Best Director - Feature	Best 3D Release
**Brad Armstrong - Speed**; Bishop - Fatally Obsessed; Axel Braun - Batman XXX: A Porn Parody; Robby D. - Body Heat; Stormy Daniels - Whatever It Takes; William H., Graham Travis - Pornstar Superheroes; Sam Hain - The Sex Files 2: A Dark XXX Parody; Andre Madness - Rawhide 2: Dirty Deeds; Lee Roy Myers - The Big Lebowski: A XXX Parody; Gary Orona - Sanatorium; Ilana Rothman - An Open Invitation: A Real Swinger's Party in San Francisco; Will Ryder - Not Charlie's Angels XXX; B. Skow - The Condemned; Nicholas Steele - BatfXXX: Dark Night Parody; Lew Xypher - Malice in Lalaland	**This Ain't Avatar XXX**; 3D MILF Memoirs; Octopussy 3-D: A XXX Parody; Porn Star Fantasies 3D; The Virtual Reality Stimulator 3D
Best Parody - Comedy	Best Parody - Drama
**Batman XXX: A Porn Parody**; The A-Team XXX: A Parody; The Big Lebowski: A XXX Parody; The Breakfast Club: A XXX Parody; Cheers: A XXX Parody; The Human Sexipede; Not Married with Children XXX 2; Not M*A*S*H XXX; Not the Bradys XXX: Bradys Meet the Partridge Family; Official Jersey Shore Parody; Seinfeld 2: A XXX Parody; This Ain't Glee XXX; This Ain't Happy Days XXX: Fonzie Luvs Pinky; This Ain't the Barber Shop: It's a XXX Parody; WKRP in Cincinnati: A XXX Parody	**BatfXXX: Dark Night Parody**; Alice; Bonny & Clide; Gia: Portrait of a Porn Star; Not Charlie's Angels XXX; Not Really... The Dukes of Hazzard: A Hardcore Parody; Octopussy 3-D: A XXX Parody; The Sex Files 2: A Dark XXX Parody; This Ain't Avatar XXX; This Ain't Charmed XXX; This Ain’t Cops XXX; This Ain't Star Trek XXX 2: The Butterfly Effect; Tru: A XXX Parody; The Twilight Zone Porn Parody; The Vampire Sex Diaries
Best Gonzo Release	Best Interracial Release
**Buttwoman vs. Slutwoman**; Beach Patrol; Buttman's Bend Over Babes 7; Faye & Georgia's Birthday Bash; Feed the Models; Hellcats 15; Hot Girls in Tight Jeans; Joanna Angel and James Deen's European Vacation; Montana Fishburne; Rachel Starr Is Badass; Riedality; Rocco's Bitch Party 2; Rocco's Psycho Love 2; Slutty and Sluttier 12; Sport Fucking 6	**Lex the Impaler 5**; Alone in the Dark 7; Bet on Black; The Black Assassin 7; Black Listed 2; Black Shack; The Brother Load 2; Interracial Fuck Sluts; Jet Black Fuel 3; Manhammer 9; Once You Go Black 5; Rico the Destroyer 2; Savanna's Been Blackmaled 2; Sexual Blacktivity 2; True Glamour Experience
Best High-End All-Sex Release	Best New Series
**Performers of the Year 2010**; Asa Akira Is Insatiable; Beautiful Stranger; D2: Deviance; Downtown Girls; Enter the Peepshow; Fashion Fucks; Jesse Jane: Playful; Mandy Candy; Pornstar Workout 2; Pretty as They Cum 2; Surreal Sex; Tori Black Is Pretty Filthy 2; Tres Flores, Vivid Alt; Voyeur Within	**The Romance Series - New Sensations**; All New Beaver Hunt; Asian Party Sluts; Asslicious; Ass Play; Babysitter Diaries; Big Tits in Uniform; Can He Score?; Downtown Girls; Feed the Models; Foot Fetish Daily; Net Skirts; Pin-Up Girls; Rocco's Bitch Party; Rocco's Psycho Love; Round Latin Asses; Street Vendors; Unseasoned Players
Best Couples Sex Scene	Best Oral Sex Scene
**Kristina Rose, Manuel Ferrara - Kristina Rose Is Slutwoman**; Misty Stone, Tony DeSergio - Awakening to Love; Lexi Belle, James Deen - Batman XXX: A Porn Parody; Chanel Preston, Erik Everhard - Fashion Fucks; Samantha Ryan, Manuel Ferrara - Gigolos; Asa Akira, Lexington Steele - Invasian! 4; Jenna Haze, Manuel Ferrara - Just Jenna; Sasha Grey, Keni Styles - Malice in Lalaland; Alexis Texas, Johnny Sins - Performers of the Year 2010; Sadie West, Manuel Ferrara - Pornstar Superheroes; Faye Reagan, Scott Nails - Pornstars Punishment; Bobbi Starr, James Deen - Rough Sex 2; Amia Miley, Criss Strokes - Slut Puppies 4; Kayden Kross, Tommy Gunn - The Smiths; Tori Black, Rocco Siffredi - Tori, Tarra and Bobbi Love Rocco	**Tori Black - Stripper Diaries**; Briana Blair - The Big Lebowski: A XXX Parody; Monique Alexander, Raylene - Blow Me Sandwich 14; Kimberly Kane - The Condemned; Angelina Valentine - Deep Throat This 43; Francesca Lé blowbang - F for Francesca; Bobbi Starr, Adrianna Nicole, Charlotte Vale - Fuck Face; Asa Akira blowbang - Invasian! 4; Gracie Glam - Jerkoff Material 5; Kristina Rose blowbang - Kristina Rose Is Slutwoman; Lisa Ann - Massive Facials 2; Andy San Dimas - Praise the Load 4; Charley Chase - Throat Fucks 2; Nyomi Banxxx - Throat Injection 3; Jessica Drake, Angelina Ashe - Wicked Games
Best Three-Way Sex Scene, Girl/Girl/Boy	Best All-Girl Couples Sex Scene
**Kimberly Kane, Krissy Lynn, Mr. Pete - The Condemned**; Sara Sloane, Kristina Rose, Mr. Pete - All About Sara Sloane; Gracie Glam, Victoria Lawson, Levi Cash - Beach Patrol; Alexis Texas, Kristina Rose, Mark Ashley - Buttwoman vs. Slutwoman; Jenna Haze, Alexis Texas, Mr. Pete - D2: Deviance; Raven Alexis, Sasha Grey, Manuel Ferrara - Fly Girls; Ashlyn Rae, Nicole Ray, Mikey Butders - Not the Bradys XXX: Pussy Power; Kagney Linn Karter, Shyla Stylez, Mark Ashley - Pornstar Workout 2; Rachel Starr, Asa Akira, Mick Blue - Rachel Starr Is Badass; Joanna Angel, Draven Star, James Deen - Rebel Girl; Allie Haze, Andy San Dimas, Evan Stone - Secretary's Day 4; Tori Black, Jessica Drake, Manuel Ferrara - Speed; Sunny Leone, Daisy Marie, Voodoo - Sunny's B/G Adventure; Tori Black, Andy San Dimas, Mr. Pete - Tori Black Is Pretty Filthy 2; Faye Reagan, Jackie Daniels, Evan Stone - WKRP in Cincinnati: A XXX Parody	**Jenna Haze, Monique Alexander - Meow!**; Kimberly Kane, Savanna Samson - Beautiful Stranger; Lexi Belle, Monique Alexander - The Best of... Vol. 2: Lexi Belle; Cindy Hope, Peaches - Budapest; Capri Anderson, Ruby Knox - Foot Fetish Daily; Tori Black, Sunny Leone - Gia: Portrait of a Porn Star; Gracie Glam, Brooke Lee Adams - Girl Crush; India Summer, Lorelei Lee - An Open Invitation: A Real Swinger's Party in San Francisco; Jayden Cole, Victoria - Pin-Up Girls 5; Melissa Monet, Justine Joli - River Rock Women's Prison; Allie Haze, Gracie Glam - She's My Man 7; Bobbi Starr, Syd Blakovich - Strapped Dykes; Tori Black, Bobbi Starr - Tori Black: Superstar; Zoe Voss, Ryan Keely - Women Seeking Women 63; Prinzzess, Tanner Mayes - Women Seeking Women 65
Best Double-Penetration Sex Scene	Fan Awards
**Asa Akira, Toni Ribas, Erik Everhard, Asa Akira Is Insatiable**; Tara Lynn Foxx, Jon Jon, Lee Bang, Julius Ceazher - Alone in the Dark 7; Mason Moore, Erik Everhard, Steve Holmes - Bra Busters; Bobbi Starr, Prince Yahshua, Mark Anthony - The Brother Load 2; Nikki Jayne, Marco Banderas, Jerry - The Condemned; Aliz, Tony DeSergio, Marco Banderas - Don't Make Me Beg 3; Tarra White, Denis Marti, Mick Blue - Evil Anal 11; Francesca Lé, Chris Charming, Prince Yahshua - F for Francesca; Sasha Grey, Rico Strong, Brian Pumper - Fuck Sasha Grey; Kristina Rose, Mick Blue, James Deen - Kristina Rose Is Slutwoman; Mika Tan, Marco Banderas, Chris Charming - The Perfect Secretary: Training Day; Emma Heart, Ben English, David Perry - Slut Tracker; Tori Black, Mick Blue, James Deen - Tori Black Is Pretty Filthy 2; Mackenzee Pierce, T. J. Cummings, Billy Glide - Whatever It Takes; Aletta Ocean, David Perry, Mick Blue - You, Me & Her	Best Body: **Alektra Blue**; Favorite Performer: **Jenna Haze**; Wildest Sex Scene: **Kayden Kross, Jesse Jane, Riley Steele, Katsuni, Raven Alexis - Body Heat**; Favorite Movie: **Asa Akira Is Insatiable**
Crossover Star of the Year	Best Porn Star Website
**Riley Steele**; Joanna Angel; Stormy Daniels; Penny Flame; April Flores; Sasha Grey; Tommy Gunn; Jesse Jane; Ron Jeremy; Sunny Leone; Bree Olson; Mr. Marcus; Trina Michaels	**Joanna Angel (JoannaAngel.com)**; Lisa Ann (TheLisaAnn.com); Belladonna, (EnterBelladonna.com); Lexi Belle (LexiBelle.com); Nikki Benz (NikkiBenz.com); Tori Black (ToriBlack.com); Sophie Dee (ClubSophieDee.com); Kelly Divine (KellyDivine.com); Jessica Drake (JessicaDrake.com); Lupe Fuentes (ILoveLupe.com); Jenna Haze (JennaHaze.com); Sara Jay (SaraJay.com); Kayden Kross (ClubKayden.com); Sunny Leone (SunnyLeone.com); Mariah Milano (MariahXXX.com)
Top Renting and Selling Release	Reuben Sturman Award
**Batman XXX: A Porn Parody**	**John Stagliano**

=== Additional Award Winners ===
These awards were announced in a winners-only segment but were not presented their awards on stage during the event and were not part of the televised awards show:

**DVD Categories**

- Best All-Girl Release: Meow!
- Best All-Girl Series: Women Seeking Women
- Best All-Sex Release: Just Jenna
- Best All-Sex Series: Don't Make Me Beg
- Best Alternative Release: Extreme Public Adventures
- Best Amateur Release: Absolute Amateurs 3
- Best Amateur Series: ATK Galleria
- Best Anal-Themed Release: Big Wet Asses! 16
- Best Anal-Themed Series: Evil Anal
- Best Animated Release: Bound to Please
- Best BDSM Release: Bondage Wonderland
- Best Big Bust Release: Bra Busters
- Best Big Bust Series: Big Tits at School
- Best Big Butt Release: Asslicious 2
- Best Big Butt Series: Big Ass Fixation
- Best Classic Release: Aunt Peg's Fulfillment
- Best Comedy: Couples Camp
- Best DVD Extras: Speed, Wicked Pictures
- Best DVD Menus: Batman XXX: A Porn Parody - Axel Braun/Vivid Entertainment
- Best Educational Release: Tristan Taormino's Expert Guide to Advanced Fellatio
- Best Ethnic-Themed Release – Asian: Asian Fucking Nation 4
- Best Ethnic-Themed Release – Black: Black Ass Addiction 6
- Best Ethnic-Themed Release – Latin: Buttman's Rio Extreme Girls
- Best Ethnic-Themed Series – Asian: Naughty Little Asians
- Best Ethnic-Themed Series – Black: Black Ass Addiction
- Best Ethnic-Themed Series – Latin: Latin Adultery
- Best Fem-Dom Strap-On Release: Strap Attack 12
- Best Foot/Leg Fetish Release: Party of Feet 2
- Best Foreign All-Sex Release: Tori Black: Nymphomaniac
- Best Foreign All-Sex Series: Rocco: Puppet Master
- Best Foreign Feature: Alice: A Fairy Love Tale
- Best Gonzo Series: Slutty and Sluttier
- Best Interactive DVD: Interactive Sex with Alexis Texas
- Best Internal Release: Unplanned Parenthood
- Best Internal Series: All Internal
- Best Interracial Series: It's Big, It's Black, It's Jack
- Best MILF Release: Dirty Rotten Mother Fuckers 4
- Best MILF Series: Seasoned Players
- Best New Line: The Ass Factory
- Best New Video Production Company: Axel Braun Productions
- Best Older Woman/Younger Girl Release: Mother-Daughter Exchange Club 12
- Best Online Marketing Campaign – Company Image: Adam & Eve Pictures, AdamEvePictures.com
- Best Online Marketing Campaign – Individual Project: BatfXXX: Dark Night Parody, Bluebird Films (BatFXXX.com)
- Best Oral Release: Fuck Face
- Best Oral Series: Suck It Dry
- Best Orgy/Gangbang Release: Out Numbered 5
- Best Orgy/Gangbang Series: Fuck Team Five
- Best Overall Marketing Campaign – Company Image: Vivid Entertainment
- Best Overall Marketing Campaign – Individual Project: Batman XXX: A Porn Parody, Axel Braun/Vivid Entertainment
- Best Packaging: Body Heat, Digital Playground
- Best Packaging Innovation: Malice in Lalaland - Miss Lucifer/Vivid Entertainment
- Best POV Release: Jack's POV 15
- Best POV Series: Jack’s POV
- Best Pro-Am Release: Brand New Faces 26
- Best Pro-Am Series: Can He Score?
- Best Solo Release: All by Myself 4
- Best Special Effects: BatfXXX: Dark Night Parody
- Best Specialty Release – Other Genre: Asses of Face Destruction 9
- Best Specialty Series: Barefoot Confidential
- Best Squirting Release: Big League Squirters
- Best Squirting Series: Squirtamania
- Best Transsexual Release: America's Next Top Tranny: Season 6
- Best Transsexual Series: She-Male XTC
- Best Vignette Release: Pornstars Punishment
- Best Vignette Series: Bad Girls
- Best Young Girl Release: Cum Spoiled Brats
- Best Young Girl Series: Barely Legal
- Clever Title of the Year: The Devil Wears Nada

**Performer/Creator Categories**

- Best All-Girl Group Sex Scene: Kayden Kross, Jesse Jane, Riley Steele, Katsuni, Raven Alexis - Body Heat
- Best All-Girl Three-Way Sex Scene: Alexis Texas, Kristina Rose, Asa Akira - Buttwoman vs. Slutwoman
- Best Anal Sex Scene: Asa Akira, Manuel Ferrara - Asa Akira Is Insatiable
- Best Art Direction: BatfXXX: Dark Night Parody
- Best Cinematography/Videography: Fliktor, Butch, BatfXXX: Dark Night Parody
- Best Director – Ethnic Video: Jules Jordan - Lex the Impaler 5
- Best Director – Foreign Feature: Paul Chaplin - Department S, Mission One: City of Broken Angels
- Best Director – Foreign Non-Feature: Gazzman - Tori Black: Nymphomaniac
- Best Director – Non Feature: William H., Performers of the Year 2010
- Best Editing: Lew Xypher - Malice in Lalaland
- Best Group Sex Scene: Alexis Texas, Kristina Rose, Gracie Glam, Michael Stefano, Buttwoman vs. Slutwoman
- Best Makeup: Red Velvet, Rosa, Lisa Sloane, Melissa Makeup - BatfXXX: Dark Night Parody
- Best Male Newcomer: Seth Gamble
- Best Music Soundtrack: This Ain't Glee XXX
- Best Non-Sex Performance: James Bartholet, Not Charlie's Angels XXX
- Best Original Song: “Big Tushy Hos” by Drew Rose - This Ain't Glee XXX
- Best POV Sex Scene: Tori Black, Jack's POV 15
- Best Screenplay – Adapted: Axel Braun, Batman XXX: A Porn Parody
- Best Screenplay – Original: David Stanley, The Condemned
- Best Sex Scene in a Foreign-Shot Production: Tori Black, Steve Holmes, Jazz Duro - Tori Black: Nymphomaniac
- Best Solo Sex Scene: Joanna Angel, Rebel Girl
- Best Supporting Actor: Evan Stone - Batman XXX: A Porn Parody
- Best Supporting Actress: Lexi Belle - Batman XXX: A Porn Parody
- Best Tease Performance: Eva Angelina, Alexis Texas - Car Wash Girls
- Best Three-Way Sex Scene, Girl /Boy/Boy: Asa Akira, Prince Yahshua, Jon Jon - Asa Akira Is Insatiable
- Director of the Year (Body of Work): Axel Braun
- Female Foreign Performer of the Year: Angel Dark
- Male Foreign Performer of the Year: Rocco Siffredi
- MILF/Cougar Performer of the Year: Julia Ann
- Most Outrageous Sex Scene: Adrianna Nicole, Amy Brooke, Allie Haze in “Enema Boot Camp,” Belladonna: Fetish Fanatic 8
- Transsexual Performer of the Year: Bailey Jay
- Unsung Male Performer of the Year: Mark Ashley
- Unsung Starlet of the Year: Charley Chase

**Retail and Distribution Categories**

- Best Adult Distributor: IVD/East Coast News
- Best Boutique (East): Eve's Garden, New York, NY
- Best Boutique (West): Babeland, Seattle, WA
- Best Retail Chain: Good Vibrations
- Best Retail Store (East): Fairvilla Megastore, Orlando, FL
- Best Retail Store (West): Castle Megastore, Tempe, AZ

**Sex Toys and Pleasure Products**

- Best Fetish Product: Ballz Gag, Stockroom
- Best Lingerie or Apparel Company: Baci Lingerie
- Best Overall Sex Toy Line: Fleshlight Girls, Fleshlight
- **Best Packaging** Doc Johnson, Platinum Pure Silicon
- Best Party, Game or Gag Product: Love Poker, California Exotic Novelties
- Best Sex Accessory: Afterglow Natural Massage Oil Candle, Jimmyjane
- Best Sex Toy Company (Large): LELO
- Best Sex Toy Company (Small): Je Joue
- Best Sex Toy for Couples: Couples Remote Control Vibrating Egg, Penthouse/Topco
- Best Sex Toy for Men: Sex in A Can, Fleshlight
- Best Sex Toy for Women: G-Ki, Je Joue

**Web and Technology Categories**

- Best Alternative Website: Kink.com
- Best Dating Website: AshleyMadison.com
- Best Live Chat Website: IMLive.com
- Best Membership Site: AbbyWinters.com
- Best Membership Site Network: Brazzers.com
- Best Photography Website: AndrewBlake.com
- Best Retail Website: AdultDVDEmpire.com
- Best Web Premiere: Dong of the Dead, BurningAngel.com
- Best Web Star: Kelly Madison, KellyMadison.com

== Honorary AVN Awards ==
=== Reuben Sturman Award ===
John Stagliano was awarded the Reuben Sturman Award "for his successful defense of obscenity charges" in 2010.

=== Hall of Fame ===
AVN Hall of Fame inductees for 2011 were: Belladonna, Axel Braun, Gia Darling, Ben Dover, Jada Fire, Jules Jordan, Bridgette Kerkove, Miles Long, Sinnamon Love, Sonny Malone, Pat Myne, Savanna Samson, Jasmin St. Claire, Scott St. James and Evan Stone.

- Founders Branch: Russell Hampshire, VCA Pictures; Mike Moran, Lion's Den; Steven Orenstein, Wicked Pictures
- Pleasure Product Branch: Joani Blank, Good Vibrations; Ron Braverman, Doc Johnson; Susan Colvin, California Exotic Novelties; Marty Tucker, Topco.
- Internet Founders Branch: Mitch Farber, Netbilling; Colin Rowntree, Wasteland.com; Tim Valenti, NakedSword.com.

== Multiple nominations and awards ==
The following releases received multiple awards:

- 7 awards: Batman XXX: A Porn Parody
- 6 awards: BatfXXX: Dark Night Parody
- 4 awards: Asa Akira Is Insatiable, Speed
- 3 awards: Body Heat, Buttwoman vs. Slutwoman, This Ain't Glee XXX and Tori Black: Nymphomaniac
- 2 awards: The Condemned, Jack’s POV 15, Lex the Impaler 5, Malice in Lalaland, Meow! and Performers of the Year 2010

The following releases received the most nominations

- 19 nominations: Malice in Lalaland
- 16 nominations: BatfXXX: Dark Night Parody, Batman XXX: A Porn Parody
- 15 nominations: Speed, The Big Lebowski: A XXX Parody
- 14 nominations: The Sex Files 2: A Dark XXX Parody, Bonny & Clide
- 11 nominations: Body Heat, The Condemned, An Open Invitation: A Real Swinger's Party in San Francisco

The following individuals received multiple awards:

- 4 awards: Asa Akira, Tori Black
- 3 awards: Axel Braun, Kristina Rose, Riley Steele, Evan Stone, Alexis Texas
- 2 awards: Raven Alexis, Joanna Angel, Manuel Ferrara, Gracie Glam, Jesse Jane, Jules Jordan, Katsuni, Kayden Kross

The following individuals received the most nominations:

- 22 nominations (an AVN Awards record): Tori Black
- 17 nominations: Bobbi Starr
- 14 nominations: Kristina Rose
- 13 nominations: Andy San Dimas
- 12 nominations (excluding nominations as producer): Manuel Ferrara
- 10 nominations: Asa Akira

== Presenters and performers ==
The following individuals were presenters or performers during the awards ceremony:

=== Presenters ===
Presenters (in order of appearance)

Name(s)	Role
Joanna Angel; Tommy Gunn; Lupe Fuentes	Presenters of the awards for Best Oral Sex Scene and Best High-End All-Sex Release
Shyla Stylez; Evan Stone	Presenters of the awards for Best All-Girl Couples Sex Scene and Best Gonzo Release
Rocco Siffredi; Tera Patrick; Chi Chi LaRue	Presenters of the awards for Best Actor and Best Interracial Release
Celeste Star; Misty Stone	Presenters of the award for Best Double Penetration Scene
Amia Miley; Samantha Ryan; Sunny Lane	Presenters of the award for Best Porn Star Website
Madelyn Marie; Chanel Preston	Trophy girls
Sunny Leone; Alexis Ford; Paul Fishbein	Presenters of the award for Best Renting and Selling Title of the Year
Paul Cambria; Louis Sirkin; Allan Gelbard	Presenters of the Reuben Sturman Award
Savanna Samson; Noel Biderman	Presenters of the Ashley Madison Crossover Star of the Year
Kagney Linn Karter	Presenter of the Best New Starlet award
Bobbi Starr; Jessie Andrews; Prince Yahshua	Presenters of the award for Best Three-Way Sex Scene, Girl/Girl/Boy
Jessica Drake; Keni Styles	Presenters of the four Fan Favorite awards
Tom Byron; Prinzzess; Bibi Jones	Presenters of the awards for Best Couples Sex Scene and Best Actress
Andy San Dimas; Nyomi Banxxx; Dale DaBone	Presenters of the awards for Best Parody Drama and Best Parody Comedy
Ron Jeremy; Dani Jensen; Teagan Presley	Presenters of the award for Female Performer of the Year
Lisa Lampanelli	Introduced the performance by Speaker Junkies
Jenna Haze; Sarah Vandella; Raven Alexis	Presenters of the award for Best Video Feature

=== Trophy girls ===
Trophy girls
- Madelyn Marie
- Chanel Preston

=== Performers ===
Performers

Name(s)	Role	Performed
Lisa Lampanelli	Host	Comedian
Jessie Andrews	Backstage	Interviews
Speaker Junkies	Performer	Musical act performs "Losing Control"

== Changes to awards categories ==
Beginning with the 28th AVN Awards, AVN Media Network added a category to the awards show, entitled Best Web Premiere, "to recognize original and outstanding content production exclusively for the web."

Five new categories were also introduced to recognize the retail and distribution sector of the adult industry:

- Best Adult Distributor (East region)
- Best Adult Distributor (West region)
- Best Retail Boutique (East region)
- Best Retail Boutique (West region)
- Best Retail Chain

== Controversies ==
Comedian Andy Dick was ejected from the awards ceremony before the show had even started for allegedly pestering adult star Tera Patrick and drag queen Chi Chi LaRue backstage.

== See also ==
- AVN Award for Male Performer of the Year
- AVN Female Performer of the Year Award
- AVN Award for Male Foreign Performer of the Year
- List of members of the AVN Hall of Fame

== Other sources ==
- Gary Miller (Director) (2011). The 2011 AVN Awards Show (Television production). Los Angeles, California: Showtime Networks.
- "2011 AVN Award Winners". Adult Video News. Archived from the original on December 12, 2013.
