= Spider-Man XXX: A Porn Parody =

- Directed by: Axel Braun
- Written by: Axel Braun; Bryn Pryor
- Based on: Spider-Man by Marvel Comics
- Produced by: Shylar Cobi
- Starring: Xander Corvus; Capri Anderson; Ash Hollywood; Sarah Shevon; Brooklyn Lee; Tyler Knight
- Cinematography: Brock Landers
- Edited by: Axel Braun; Claudia Ross
- Music by: Axel Braun; Claudia Ross
- Production company: Vivid Entertainment
- Distributed by: Pulse Distribution
- Release date: August 1, 2011 (United States)
- Running time: 100 minutes
- Country: United States
- Language: English

Spider-Man XXX: A Porn Parody is a 2011 American adult entertainment superhero film written by Axel Braun and Bryn Pryor, and directed by Braun for Vivid Entertainment. As a parody of the Spider-Man comic book series by Marvel, the film stars Xander Corvus, Capri Anderson, Ash Hollywood, and Sarah Shevon.

== Plot ==
J. Jonah Jameson is attempting to run the Daily Bugle, which is harassing the "menace" known as Spider-Man, while his employees Betty Brant and Robbie Robertson have intimate relations in a back room. Across town, a power line accident results in an electric company worker being granted the power to generate and control electricity. The worker decides to become a supervillain, and so dons a costume and rechristens himself Electro. Electro hires a prostitute, and electrocutes her after they have sex. The Kingpin of Crime, Wilson Fisk, then approaches Electro, and hires him as part of an elaborate scheme.

Meanwhile, Peter Parker and his promiscuous girlfriend Mary-Jane Watson are walking through an alley when Peter's spider-sense warns him of impending danger. Peter leaves Mary-Jane alone in the alley in order to change into his Spider-Man costume, and the danger that Peter had detected manifests as a gang of thugs who threaten Mary-Jane. Peter reappears as Spider-Man in time to save Mary-Jane, and Mary-Jane rewards the hero with the classic upside-down kiss, which continues into upside-down oral sex. Spider-Man then leaves Mary-Jane, and returns changed back into his Peter Parker attire.

Peter and Mary-Jane meet up with Gwen Stacy and Flash Thompson for an off-camera double date to watch the film Black Swan. After they return to Flash's apartment, the city suffers a large scale blackout. Peter alleges that he must go check on his Aunt May, and leaves Mary-Jane at Flash's apartment. Flash suggests that Gwen and Mary-Jane join him in a threesome, and both agree, though due to the blackout much of this is only partially visible.

Spider-Man confronts Electro, and engages in a brief fight that ends when Electro accidentally electrocutes himself. Black Widow appears, and attempts to seduce Spider-Man into joining the Avengers. Peter returns home after having sex with Black Widow, and is greeted by his Aunt May, who is being visited by Otto Octavius.

== Cast ==
- Xander Corvus as Spider-Man/Peter Parker
- Capri Anderson as Mary Jane Watson
- Ash Hollywood as Gwen Stacy
- Sarah Shevon as Betty Brant
- Brooklyn Lee as Black Widow/Natasha Romanoff
- Tyler Knight as Robbie Robertson
- Lily Labeau as Liz Allan
- Robert Black as J. Jonah Jameson
- Tara Lynn Foxx as Shocked Hooker
- Blyth Hess as Aunt May
- Dick Delaware as Electro/Max Dillon
- Seth Dickens as Flash Thompson
- Michael Vegas as Harry Osborn
- Peter O'Tool as Wilson Fisk/Kingpin
- James Bartholet as Doctor Octopus/Otto Octavius

== Awards and nominations ==
Accolades received by Spider-Man XXX: A Porn Parody
Awards & nominations
Award	Won	Nominated
AVN Awards	2	15
NightMoves Awards	1	0
XBIZ Awards	1	6
XRCO Awards	1	0
- Total number of wins and nominations
Totals	5	21
- References

Year	Ceremony	Result	Category	Recipient(s)
2011	NightMoves Award	Won	First Choice Award (2012 Blockbuster Prediction)	—N/a
2012	AVN Award	Nominated	Best Anal Sex Scene	Brooklyn Lee & Xander Corvus
2012	AVN Award	Nominated	Best Art Direction	—N/a
2012	AVN Award	Won	Best Cinematography	Axel Braun & Eli Cross
2012	AVN Award	Nominated	Best Director – Parody	Axel Braun
2012	AVN Award	Nominated	Best DVD Extras	—N/a
2012	AVN Award	Nominated	Best Editing	Axel Braun & Claudia Ross
2012	AVN Award	Nominated	Best Non-Sex Performance	Rob Black
2012	AVN Award	Nominated	Best Oral Sex Scene	Capri Anderson
2012	AVN Award	Nominated	Best Overall Marketing Campaign – Individual Project	—N/a
2012	AVN Award	Nominated	Best Packaging	—N/a
2012	AVN Award	Won	Best Parody – Drama	—N/a
2012	AVN Award	Nominated	Best Screenplay – Parody	Axel Braun & Mark Logan
2012	AVN Award	Nominated	Best Special Effects	—N/a
2012	AVN Award	Nominated	Best Supporting Actor	Dick Delaware
2012	AVN Award	Nominated	Best Supporting Actress	Brooklyn Lee
2012	AVN Award	Nominated	Best Three-Way Sex Scene (G/G/B)	Ash Hollywood, Capri Anderson & Seth Dickens
2012	AVN Award	Nominated	Most Outrageous Sex Scene (for "The Amazing Upside-Down Spidey B.J.")	Capri Anderson & Xander Corvus
2012	XBIZ Award	Nominated	Parody Release of the Year - Drama	—N/a
2012	XBIZ Award	Nominated	Acting Performance of the Year - Male	Xander Corvus
2012	XBIZ Award	Nominated	Non-Sex Acting Performance of the Year	Rob Black
2012	XBIZ Award	Nominated	Best Cinematography	Axel Braun, Eli Cross & Brock Landers
2012	XBIZ Award	Nominated	Best Special Effects	—N/a
2012	XBIZ Award	Nominated	Best Editing	Axel Braun & Claudia Ross
2012	XBIZ Award	Won	Marketing Campaign of the Year	—N/a
2012	XRCO Award	Won	Best Parody – Comic Book	—N/a

== Follow-ups ==
The film was succeeded by Superman vs. Spider-Man XXX: An Axel Braun Parody in 2012, and Spider-Man XXX 2: An Axel Braun Parody in 2014. Xander Corvus also reprised his role as Spider-Man in 2013's Wolverine XXX: An Axel Braun Parody, and 2015's Avengers XXX 2: An Axel Braun Parody.

== See also ==
- Bat Pussy
- BatfXXX: Dark Night Parody
- Batman XXX: A Porn Parody
- Superman vs. Spider-Man XXX: An Axel Braun Parody
- This Ain't Avatar XXX
