= Seinfeld: A XXX Parody =

- Directed by: Lee Roy Myers
- Written by: A.J. Slater
- Starring: Sasha Grey; Ashlynn Brooke; Kristina Rose; Eric John; Steve Pomerants; Evan Stone; London Keyes; Natalie Norton; Tony DeSergio; Sadie West; Cassandra Calogera; J. Walker
- Edited by: Gabrielle Anex
- Production company: New Sensations
- Distributed by: New Sensations
- Release date: June 29, 2009
- Running time: 143 minutes
- Country: United States
- Language: English

Seinfeld: A XXX Parody is a 2009 pornographic film that parodies the series Seinfeld which ran from 1989 until 1998. Like other porn parodies, it has the same characters, settings and other production elements of the original show but adds an explicitly sexual element that was not present in the series. Written by A.J. Slater and directed by Lee Roy Myers, the plot is based on the episode "The Soup Nazi". The film stars James Deen, Kristina Rose, Eric John, Steve Pomerants, Evan Stone, Ashlynn Brooke, London Keyes, Natalie Norton, Tony DeSergio, Sasha Grey, Sadie West and Cassandra Calogera. Released to DVD on June 29, 2009, the movie received positive reviews from critics, who enjoyed the acting, casting, sexual content and comedy. In addition to the positive reception, it also earned ten nominations at the 27th AVN Awards.

== Plot ==
Like most episodes of the original show, Seinfeld: A XXX Parody opens with a stand-up sequence from Gerry (James Deen) about pornography. The film then cuts into a XXX video store, where Gerry and Elaina (Kristina Rose) are attempting to purchase porn from a man known as "The Porn Nazi" (Evan Stone). Gerry manages to buy a movie from the man, but Elaina is unsuccessful due to her behavior towards him. At Gerry's apartment, he watches the film, and he and Elaina have sex. In the next scene at the apartment with Gerry and Gorge (Steve Pomerants), Crammer (Eric John) comes in complaining that he is unable to masturbate to his old porn movies he owns. Being dissatisfied, Crammer decides to make his own porn. When he exits the scene, Gerry complains about a girl who has a crush on him, Regina (Ashlynn Brooke), because she orgasms too easily, and Gorge rants about marrying Suzanne (Natalie Norton) in less than a month, reasoning that "the pope gets more pussy than I do." Gerry suggests Gorge to spice up their love life.

Back at the video store, Elaina again tries to obtain a porn video, but the Porn Nazi recognizes her and she fails again. The woman who works next to the man at the counter (London Keyes) is also having problems with him, and she goes in the back room with Elaina. The former offers to give Elaina the Nazi's secret distributor if she'll make out with her, which the latter accepts. Meanwhile, Crammer is getting food from a picnic table when he happens to stumble upon a porn shoot between Sasha Grey and Sadie West. The camera man mistakenly takes Crammer as the actor who is going to be in the scene, which he joins. Back at Gerry's apartment, Crammer is shooting his own porn with Suzanne and a man named Buck (Tony DeSergio). The next scene, Gerry and Regina are watching TV at the apartment, and after Regina is turned on by looking at the newscasters, he decides to let her know that he cannot take her orgasms anymore. She leaves, and Noman (J. Walker) enters the room to get the tape Crammer shot so he can deliver it to Gorge.

Noman encounters Regina in the stairwell, picks her up and goes to the store with her. Upon their arrival, the Porn Nazi sees the tape in the hands of Noman, dropping the tape and then running away. Regina starts humping the Porn Nazi and they go into the back room to have sex. Back in the front room, Gerry and Crammer wait in line. Noman and Regina then enter the front room, and Gorge enters with Suzanne. The four all find the video playing on the store's television, causing a four-way argument and the group to exit the store. Elaina enters the store and tells the Nazi that he has the list of new releases from his secret distributor. The film ends with another stand-up bit from Gerry about fake breasts, and Sandra (Cassandra Calogera) is up on stage showing Gerry that her breasts are real. He is seen playing with her breasts for the remainder of the movie.

== Cast ==
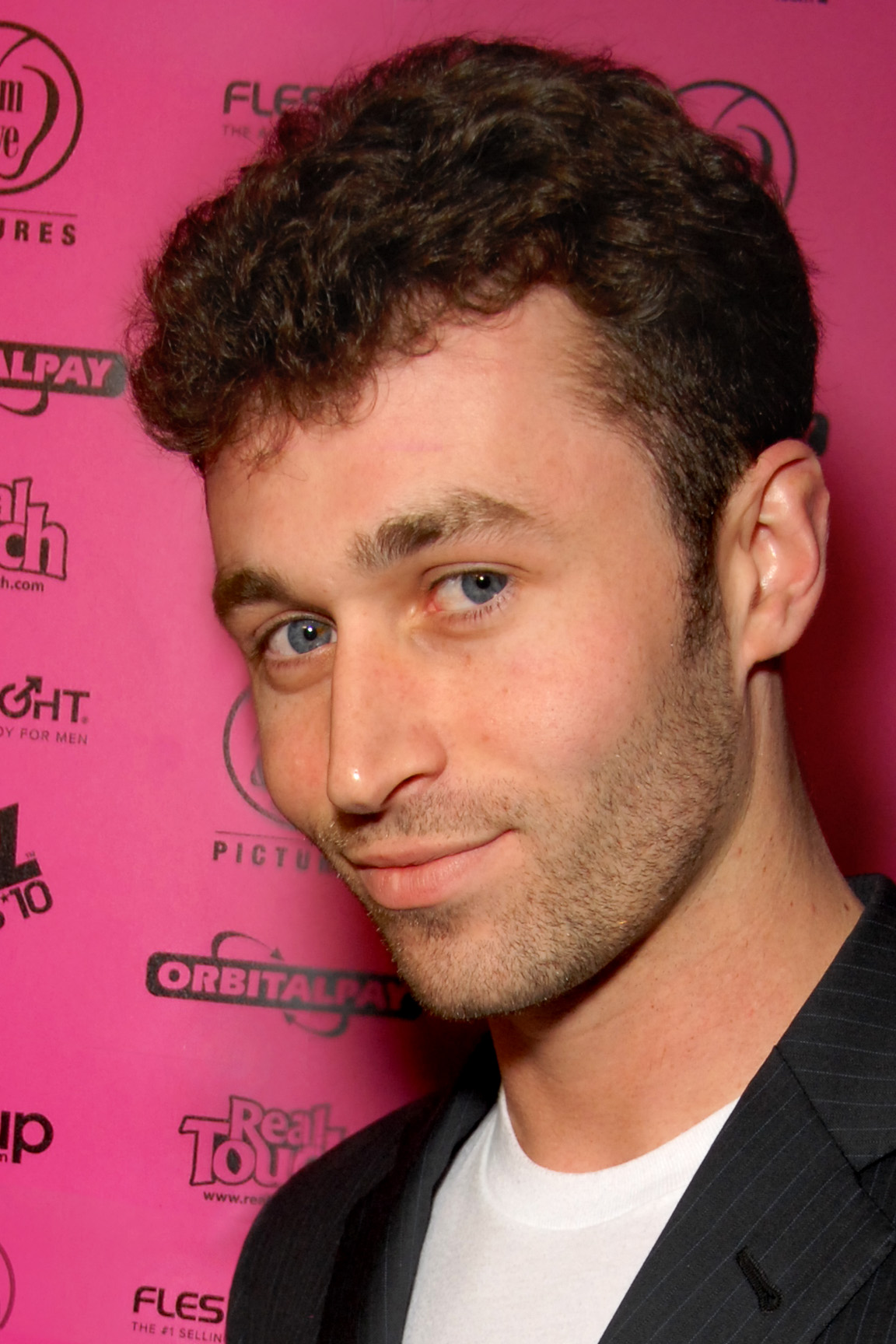
James Deen played Gerry, a parody of Jerry Seinfeld.

- James Deen as Gerry, parody of Jerry Seinfeld
- Kristina Rose as Elaina, parody of Elaine Benes
- Eric John as Crammer, parody of Cosmo Kramer
- Steve Pomerants as Gorge, parody of George Costanza
- Evan Stone as "The Porn Nazi", parody of "The Soup Nazi"
- Ashlynn Brooke as Regina
- London Keyes as Video Store Girl
- J. Walker as Noman, parody of Newman
- Natalie Norton as Suzanne, parody of Susan Ross
- Tony DeSergio as Buck
- Sasha Grey as Herself
- Sadie West as Herself
- Cassandra Calogera as Sandra, parody of Sidra Holland
- Shawna Lenee as Herself (DVD bonus scene)

== Production ==
Seinfeld: A XXX Parody was written by A.J. Slater and directed by Lee Roy Myers. Filming began on April 10, 2009 in San Fernando Valley. In an interview, Myers said that he thought the sets and performances were exactly like the original show, saying that "people will be shocked". He said their goal was to "do an episode as if there was sex in the episode". The cast members said that they spent much time watching the original show and studying the original characters they were going to impersonate in preparing to act for the movie.

== Release and reception ==
Seinfeld: A XXX Parody was released on region-free DVD on June 27, 2009. The DVD release has several special features including a bonus scene with Eric John and Shawna Leene, a behind-the-scenes featurette, photo gallery, outtakes, "Gerry's Joke-a-rama" and trailers.

Critical reviews of Seinfeld: A XXX Parody were positive. Peter Warren of Adult Video News gave it a critical rating of "AAAA", praising the sex scenes and cast of characters. Sarah Schneider of Splitsider called it "great", noting she enjoyed the impressions of the characters and the complex story. TLA Video writer Spock Buckton gave the film four stars, writing that "In a year of shitty parodies that were about as funny as a dick chancre, Seinfeld stood out like a sore thumb... you know, in a good way!" XCritic's Don Houston awarded it a 3-star rating, calling it his favorite movie by Lee Roy Myers.

== Awards ==
Award	Subject	Nominee	Result	Ref
AVN Award	Best Feature Director	Lee Roy Myers	Nominated	
AVN Award	Best DVD Extras		Nominated	
AVN Award	Best Makeup	Maria (I)	Nominated	
AVN Award	Best Non-Sex Performance	Steve Pomerantz	Nominated	
AVN Award	Best On-Line Marketing Campaign, Individual Project		Nominated	
AVN Award	Best Packaging		Nominated	
AVN Award	Best Screenplay	A.J. Slater	Nominated	
AVN Award	Best Sex Parody		Nominated	
AVN Award	Best Supporting Actress	Kristina Rose	Nominated	
AVN Award	Best Couples Sex Scene	Ashlynn Brooke and Evan Stone	Nominated	

== Sequel ==
A sequel, Seinfeld: A XXX Parody 2, was made and released by New Sensations in 2010. In this sequel, Crammer, Gorge, Elaina and Gerry challenge themselves on who will last the longest without having sex. It earned five nominations at the 2011 28th AVN Awards.
