= Misty Stone =

American pornographic film actress

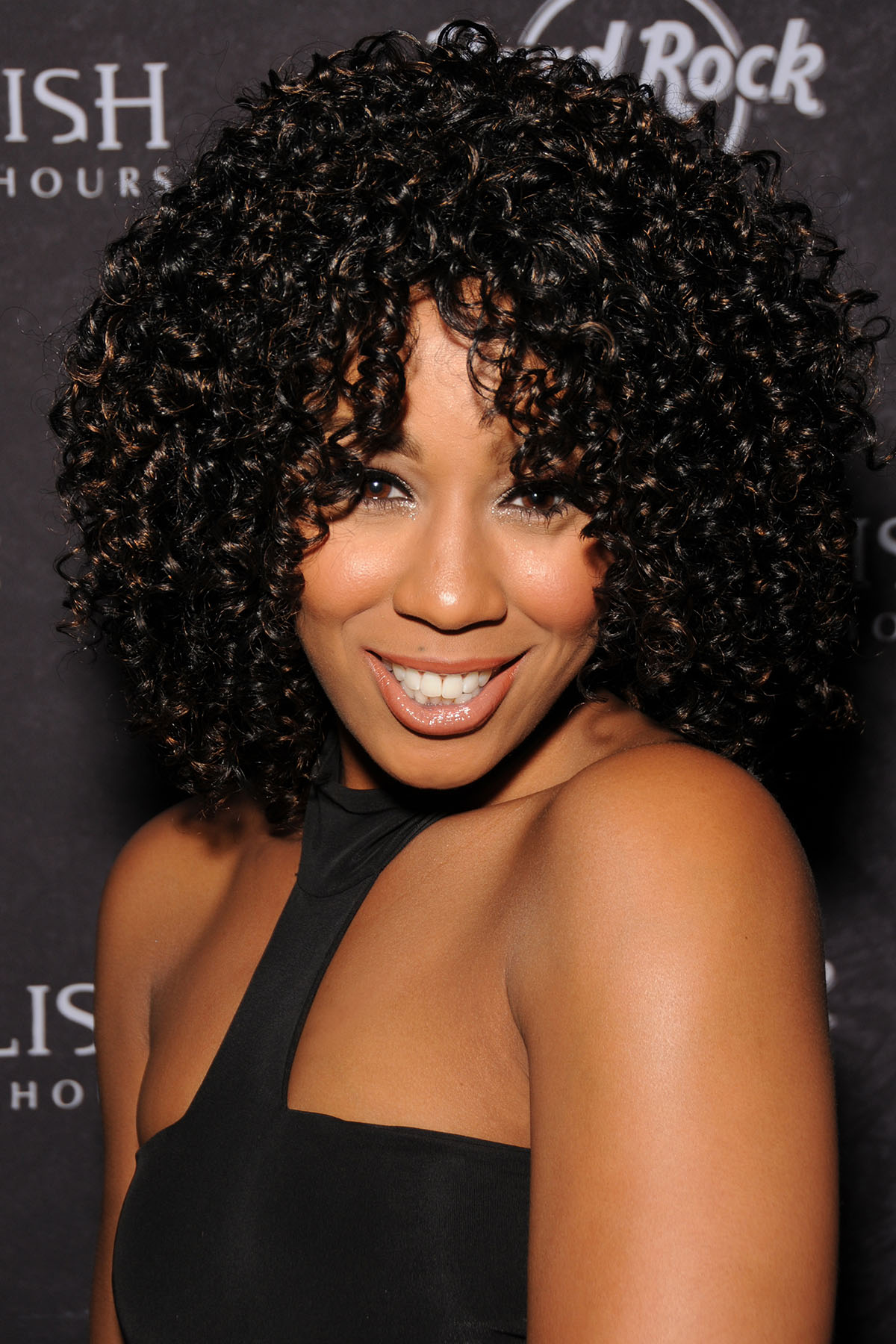
- Occupation: Pornographic film actress
- Awards: AVN Award for Best Non-Sex Performance (40th AVN Awards, 2023); AVN Award for Best Non-Sex Performance (37th AVN Awards, 2020)
- Website: mistystone.com

Misty Stone is an American pornographic film actress. She was the Penthouse Pet of the Month for December 2014.

== Career ==
According to The Daily Beast and The Root, Stone is known as the "Halle Berry" of the porn industry.

Stone has stated that she enjoys acting, but did not have the opportunity to indulge in it until she was cast as Denise Huxtable in the 2009 pornographic parody film Not the Cosbys XXX. She went on to star in the 2011 Hustler’s Untrue Hollywood Stories: Oprah parody as the title character of Oprah Winfrey.

Also in 2013, Stone co-hosted the XRCO Award ceremonies with Ed Powers followed by co-hosting the Nightmoves awards with Ron Jeremy. Stone was also nominated in several categories for the award including Porn Star of the Year, Sexiest Adult Star, Porn's Best Body, and Porn's Perfect Sex Couple (girl/girl).

In February 2014, Stone announced that she was working on appearing in mainstream productions and that, going forward in the adult film industry, she would only perform scenes in the girl/girl and solo genres. In March 2014, she began filming for a production titled I Thought You Were A Nice Man, the first of three film projects.

Stone was selected to be the December 2014 Penthouse Pet of the Month. Her pictorial was shot by glamour photographer Holly Randall and she was also featured on the cover. Stone stated about her selection as a Penthouse Pet, "It's more than an honor to be crowned the Penthouse Pet for December, it's surreal . . ." "I think by being crowned the Penthouse Pet of the Month shows that the world is changing, and change is good, and all things are possible."

=== Mainstream appearances ===
Stone appeared in the VH1 reality show Basketball Wives. In 2013 Stone voiced a character in the video game Grand Theft Auto V.

Stone was one of the pornographic film actresses profiled in a 2013 documentary film and accompanying fine art book by Deborah Anderson titled Aroused.

Stone was among the pornographic film actresses who appeared in the welcome home party scene for Jax Teller after his release from prison in the Season 7 premiere of Sons of Anarchy, which aired on September 9, 2014. She has also had a variety of minor roles in television movies and feature films such as the romantic comedy Don Jon (2013).

=== Other ventures ===
In 2013, she launched her own production company, Misty Stone Productions. She also produces and sells a line of organic beauty products that include a body butter candle. Her body has also been molded for the creation of a line of sex toys. Stone is the first black performer to be molded by the company that manufactures the Fleshlight.

== Personal life ==
Stone voted for Barack Obama in the 2008 United States presidential election and voiced her support for Hillary Clinton in the 2016 United States presidential election.

== Awards and nominations ==
AVN Awards
| Year | Result | Award | Film |
|---|---|---|---|
| 2009 | Nominated | Best All-Girl Couples Sex Scene (with Flower Tucci, Desire Moore, Holly Wellin, Mickey Graham, Stephanie Cane, Audrey Hollander & Brooke Scott) | The Violation of Flower Tucci |
| 2010 | Nominated | Best All-Girl Couples Sex Scene (with Sochee Mala) | Pussy a Go Go |
| 2010 | Nominated | Best Oral Sex Scene (with Lexi Love) | Flight Attendants |
| 2010 | Nominated | Best Supporting Actress | Flight Attendants |
| 2010 | Nominated | Female Performer of the Year | —N/a |
| 2011 | Nominated | Best Actress | A Love Triangle |
| 2011 | Nominated | Best Couples Sex Scene (with Tony DeSergio) | Awakening to Love |
| 2011 | Nominated | Best Supporting Actress | Awakening to Love |
| 2011 | Nominated | Best Group Sex Scene (with Kaylani Lei, Jessica Drake, Kirsten Price, Alektra Blue, Chanel Preston, Kayme Kai, Tory Lane, Briana Blair, Mick Blue, Dale DaBone, Barrett Blade, Eric Masterson, Marcus London, Sascha & Bill Bailey) | Speed |
| 2011 | Nominated | Female Performer of the Year | —N/a |
| 2011 | Nominated | Most Outrageous Sex Scene (with Chanel Preston, Dale DaBone, Lexington Steele, Jules Ventura & Chris Johnson) | This Ain't Avatar XXX 3D |
| 2012 | Nominated | Best Actress | Hustler's Untrue Hollywood Stories: Oprah |
| 2012 | Nominated | Best Boy/Girl Sex Scene (with Bill Bailey) | Taxi Driver: A XXX Parody |
| 2013 | Nominated | Best Group Sex Scene (with Mika Tan, Skin Diamond, Brooklyn Lee, James Deen, Dane Cross & Alex Gonz) | Official The Hangover Parody |
| 2013 | Nominated | Best Solo Sex Scene | Men In Black: A Hardcore Parody |
| 2013 | Nominated | Best Supporting Actress | Men In Black: A Hardcore Parody |
| 2013 | Nominated | Female Performer of the Year | —N/a |
| 2014 | Nominated | Best Three-Way Sex Scene – G/G/B (with Leilani Leeane & Marcus London) | $ex |
| 2019 | Won | Hall of Fame | —N/a |
| 2020 | Won | Best Non-Sex Performance | Love Emergency |
| 2023 | Won | Best Non-Sex Performance | Love, Sex and Music |

Brazzers
| Year | Result | Award |
|---|---|---|
| 2024 | Won | Hall of Fame |

NightMoves Awards
| Year | Result | Award |
|---|---|---|
| 2013 | Won | Best Ethnic Performer (Editor's Choice) |
| 2014 | Nominated | Best Body |
| 2015 | Won | NightMoves Hall of Fame |

Urban X Awards
| Year | Result | Award | Film |
|---|---|---|---|
| 2009 | Won | Best Girl-Girl Sex Scene (with Rane Revere) | Black Teen Pussy 3 |
| 2010 | Won | Porn Star of the Year | —N/a |
| 2010 | Nominated | Female Performer of the Year | —N/a |
| 2011 | Nominated | Best Couples Sex Scene (with Tom Byron) | House of Ass 14 |
| 2012 | Won | Best Couples Sex Scene (with Bill Bailey) | Horizon |
| 2012 | Nominated | Best Couples Sex Scene (with Erik Everhard) | Seduction |
| 2012 | Nominated | Female Performer of the Year | —N/a |
| 2012 | Nominated | Orgasmic Oralist | —N/a |
| 2017 | Won | Female Performer of the Year | —N/a |
| 2017 | Won | Hall of Fame | —N/a |
| 2024 | Won | Founder Favorite | —N/a |
| 2026 | Won | Fan Favorite Female Pornstar | —N/a |

XBIZ Awards
| Year | Result | Award | Film |
|---|---|---|---|
| 2011 | Nominated | Female Performer of the Year | —N/a |
| 2012 | Nominated | Female Performer of the Year | —N/a |
| 2013 | Nominated | Best Actress - Parody Release | Men in Black: A Hardcore Parody |
| 2014 | Nominated | Best Scene - Parody Release (with Jessie Rogers & Xander Corvus) | OMG...It's the Spice Girls XXX Parody |

XRCO Awards
| Year | Result | Award | Film |
|---|---|---|---|
| 2010 | Nominated | Unsung Siren | —N/a |
| 2010 | Nominated | Single Performance – Actress | Not The Cosbys XXX |
| 2024 | Won | Hall of Fame | —N/a |
