= Batman XXX =

2010 pornographic film directed by Axel Braun

Batman XXX: A Porn Parody
- DVD cover
- Directed by: Axel Braun
- Written by: Axel Braun
- Based on: Batman
- Produced by: Axel Braun
- Starring: Tori Black; Dale DaBone; James Deen; Lexi Belle
- Cinematography: Jack Remy
- Edited by: Claudia Ross
- Music by: Mr. Bones
- Production company: Axel Braun Productions
- Distributed by: Vivid Entertainment
- Release date: May 21, 2010
- Running time: 119 minutes
- Country: United States

Batman XXX: A Porn Parody is a 2010 pornographic superhero comedy film that parodies the 1960s Batman television series. It features many of the recurring characters, settings, and production elements of the series, but adds an explicitly sexual element which was not present in the original material. The film is the first of several films by Vivid Entertainment to feature parodies of well-known superhero portrayals in movies and television. The positive reaction to the film caused Vivid to announce plans for an entire line of similar films, to be released under the new Axel Braun-led imprint Vivid Superhero. Braun later directed another Batman-themed porn parody: 2012's Dark Knight XXX: A Porn Parody, where Batman is portrayed by Giovanni Francesco, who reprises the role in the 2013 film Man of Steel XXX: An Axel Braun Parody and in the 2015 film Batman v Superman XXX: An Axel Braun Parody.

== Plot summary ==
Bruce Wayne's girlfriend, Lisa Carson, is kidnapped by the Riddler. She has sex with him in an attempt to curry his favour, but he still ultimately delivers her to the Joker. Batman and Robin are called in by the police to help in the rescue.

Batman investigates a nightclub fronting the villains' lair, but is drugged and abducted by Molly, one of the Riddler's accomplices, who proceeds to have sex with him. Batgirl learns of the situation and joins Robin, who is waiting for Batman to return from the club. Batgirl and Robin sneak into the villains’ lair, whereupon they find Joker having sex with his two accomplices. Aroused, Batgirl and Robin have sex, which distracts them and allows them to be discovered and captured by Catwoman's henchmen.

The four captives – Lisa, Batman, Robin and Batgirl – are brought before the villainous trio of Joker, the Riddler and Catwoman. Joker intends to kill them but Catwoman, unwilling to kill Batman, for whom she secretly harbours feelings, frees the captured heroes. The heroes battle and defeat the collected rogues.

Grateful to Catwoman for her role in their victory, Batman and Robin have sex with her. Upon discovering that she would still have to be brought to justice for her crimes, Catwoman escapes, activating a trap that imprisons Batman and Robin, ending the film on a cliffhanger.

== Cast ==
- Dale DaBone as Batman
- James Deen as Robin
- Lexi Belle as Batgirl
- Tori Black as Catwoman
- Evan Stone as The Riddler
- Randy Spears as The Joker
- Alexis Texas as Molly
- Kimberly Kane as Lisa Carson
- Andy San Dimas as Joker's Moll #1
- Syren Sexton as Joker's Moll #2
- Levi Cash as The Bartender
- Stewart Tain as Alfred Pennyworth
- Jack English as Commissioner James Gordon
- David Alan as Chief Miles O'Hara
- Alec Knight as Goon #1
- Hawthorne Ramon as Goon #2
- Ron Jeremy as Himself

== Production ==
The production used custom sets built by Film Studios LA. Actor Nick Manning auditioned for the role of Batman in this film. Although the role went to Dale Dabone, Manning went on to play the Batman analogue in another Batman-themed porn parody that same year: Bluebird films' BatFXXX: Dark Knight Parody. Additionally, Evan Stone (The Riddler) would go on to play Batman in Extreme Comixxx's The Justice League of Pornstar Heroes. Actor Randy Spears sports a moustache covered in whiteface, creating a visual reference to Cesar Romero, who similarly painted over his notable moustache rather than shave it off for his role as the Joker. As reviewer Chris Sims writes, "considering that [Spears is] clean-shaven in the audition footage that's included as a bonus feature...I can only assume that he grew it just for authenticity." The success of the film led Vivid to commit to producing additional superhero film parodies under a new, Axel Braun-led imprint: Vivid Superhero.

== Release ==
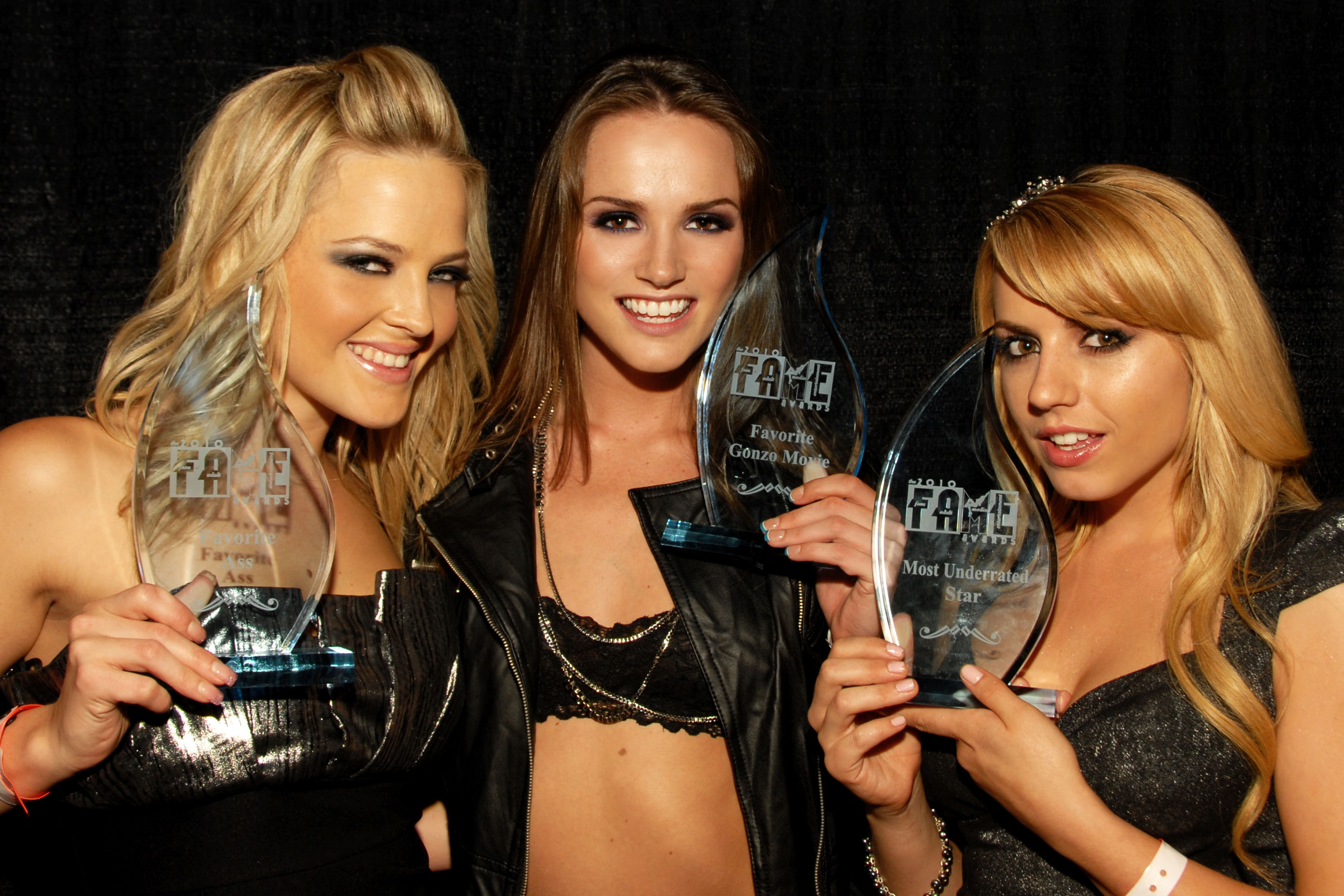
Alexis Texas, Tori Black and Lexi Belle at the F.A.M.E. Awards. Tori Black holds the award for Best Gonzo Movie of the Year: Batman XXX: A Porn Parody

The film was released on region-free DVD on May 21, 2010. The DVD release came with several special features including a behind-the-scenes featurette, photo gallery, a featurette on the casting process and a sex-free version of the film. The DVD was nominated for both Best DVD Extras and Best DVD Menus at the 2011 AVN Awards, winning the award for best menus. The film was released on Blu-ray Disc on 1 March 2011. Scenes from the film were included in a special sampler DVD that came with the first issue of Magna Publishing's magazine Vivid SuperXXXHeroes: a magazine focusing on the Vivid Superhero brand and published in November 2011. The cover of the magazine featured Lexi Belle and Tori Black as Batgirl and Catwoman, respectively. The pair were featured in the magazine's double-centrefold.

In October 2010 Axel Braun Productions filed a complaint with the United States District Court for the Northern District of West Virginia for legal action to be taken against 7,098 individuals who had illegally downloaded the film through peer-to-peer file sharing sites. In December 2010, judge John P. Bailey severed all but one of the defendants, citing misjoinder. The Electronic Frontier Foundation praised the decision as a "big victory in the fight against copyright trolls."

== Reception ==
The parody was well received and was praised for its level of attention to its source material, which included the use of obscure characters Molly and Lisa Carson from the original series, and notable double-entendre lines from the TV series ("that single statement indicates to me the first oncoming thrusts of manhood, old chum"), and takes on famous recurring gags such as the "window scenes" from the original series.

== Awards and nominations ==
The film won "Best Parody" at the seventeenth annual NightMoves Adult Entertainment Awards Show and "Favorite Parody" at the fifth annual F.A.M.E. Awards. The film won multiple accolades at the 2011 AVN Awards. Nominated for seventeen awards in sixteen categories, it won seven awards, more than any other film that year. The nominations were:

- Best Parody – Comedy (Winner)
- Best Actor (Dale DaBone)
- Best Supporting Actor (James Deen)
- Best Supporting Actor (Evan Stone) (Winner)
- Best Supporting Actress (Lexi Belle) (Winner)
- Best Couples Sex Scene (Lexi Belle & James Deen)
- Best Three-Way Sex Scene (Girl/Boy/Boy) (Tori Black, Dale DaBone, James Deen)
- Best Director - Feature (Axel Braun)
- Best Art Direction
- Best Cinematography/Videography
- Best DVD Extras
- Best DVD Menus (Winner)
- Best Editing
- Best Make-Up
- Best Screenplay- Adapted (Winner)
- Best Renting & Selling Title of the Year (Winner)
- Best Overall Marketing Campaign – Individual Project (Winner)

Additionally, Braun won several awards for his 2010 work as a whole, including this film. Braun was nominated for a total of forty-eight awards at the 2011 AVN Awards, winning several, including "Director of the Year (Body of Work)". Evan Stone (The Riddler) and Tori Black (Catwoman) won "Male Performer of the Year" and "Female Performer of the Year" respectively.

== See also ==
- Bat Pussy
- BatfXXX: Dark Night Parody
- Spider-Man XXX: A Porn Parody
- Superman vs. Spider-Man XXX: An Axel Braun Parody
- This Ain't Avatar
