= This Ain't Avatar =

2010 film by Axel Braun

- Teaser cover for the DVD of This Ain't Avatar.
- Directed by: Axel Braun
- Written by: Marc Star
- Based on: Avatar by James Cameron
- Produced by: Larry Flynt
- Starring: Evan Stone; Chris Johnson; Nicki Hunter; Danica Dillan; Eric Swiss; Misty Stone; Lexington Steele; Chanel Preston; Juelz Ventura
- Cinematography: Axel Braun
- Edited by: Axel Braun; Claudia Ross
- Distributed by: Hustler Video
- Release date: September 28, 2010
- Running time: 129 minutes
- Country: United States
- Language: English
- Budget: Most expensive film Hustler produced.

This Ain't Avatar (stylized as This Ain't Avatar XXX) is a 2010 3D science fiction pornographic parody film that parodies James Cameron's Avatar, to which it serves as a spiritual sequel. The film was shot, edited, and directed by Axel Braun and stars an ensemble cast headed by Chris Johnson as Jake, the main human character. It was produced by Hustler Video. Industry reviewers noted that the release used old-style rather than modern 3D technology and faulted it for its poor production quality.

== Plot ==
After the original events of Avatar, Jake Sully reveals in a video log that the Na'vi have a darker side. After sexual flashbacks which show moments in the film which purport to show what actually happened, the film shows what occurs after the human corporation leaves Pandora. The Na'vi turn out to be "fetish-fueled sex fiends", who have a massive orgy after the corporation leaves, and then reveal their true purpose for keeping humans in a twist ending.

== Cast ==
- Evan Stone as Miles Quaritch, the RDA's chief of security. Stone replaces Stephen Lang.
- Chris Johnson as Jake Sully, a disabled former Marine-turned Na'vi warrior. Johnson replaces Sam Worthington.
- Nicki Hunter as Dr. Grace Augustine, Jake's human guide to the Na'vi. Hunter replaces Sigourney Weaver.
- Danica Dillon as Trudy Chacón, an RDA combat pilot. Dillon replaces Michelle Rodriguez.
- Eric Swiss as Dr. Norm Spellman, a xenoanthropologist colleague of Grace's. Swiss replaces Joel David Moore.
- Misty Stone as Neytiri, a princess and Jake's Na'vi love interest. Stone replaces Zoe Saldana.
- Lexington Steele as Tsu'tey, a leader of the Na'vi tribe. Steele replaces Laz Alonso.
- Chanel Preston as Mo'at, a leader of the Na'vi tribe and Neytiri's mother. Preston replaces CCH Pounder.
- Juelz Ventura as Human Slave, a human slave, and a character original to This Ain't Avatar.

== Production ==
A series of pornography parody films were originally proposed as a joke by Axel Braun, the film's eventual director. Hustler then published a press release with a series of fake parody films (including Glee and FOX News); one of the films listed was an Avatar parody, and the producers at Hustler and Braun began serious discussions about the creation of an Avatar porn film. In March 2010, Hustler announced that Braun would be officially directing the film.

Marc Star was tapped by Hustler to write the screenplay, where he came up with the idea of having the film take place after the end of the original Avatar, and to have the sex scenes shown through video logs before and during the original film. In order to avoid confusion with it actually being part of James Cameron's Avatar universe, the names of many objects in the universe are subtly changed to parody the original Avatar. The Na'vi are referred to as Na'bi, the planet Pandora was renamed to Panwhora, and instead of being after unobtainium, the humans are after viagratanium.

In order to film the 3D sequences, Hustler contacted an outside company with 3D expertise to train their personnel and to lease their equipment. The director struggled to maneuver the 3D cameras during some of the sequences, but Braun was pleased with the end result. In order to achieve a look similar to that of the blue Na'vi from Avatar, makeup artists used gallons of blue paint on the Na'bi actresses in order to achieve a close look to that of the film. Prosthetics were attached to the performers' faces to simulate their alien nature. The film finished production in late June 2010.

Hustler released the trailer for this film's unique texture and 3D effects in September 2010.

== Reception ==
X-Critic reviewer Don Houston noted that the video "used the old fashioned red & blue anaglyph system", falling "far short of what fans should expect". He faulted the standard version as "so dark that even trying to discern what was happening was sketchy" and the 3D version for going "haywire", with the red- and blue-tinted components falling out of synchronization partway through the video, "killing the effect". He gave This Ain't Avatar a highly negative review, describing it as "was cheaply made and written on the back of a matchbook cover", and its "technical aspects" as "poorly handled".

Reviewer "JLB", a writer/editor for the IAFD, declared himself "disappointed" in the release, saying it "feels like a lazy, truncated version of James Cameron’s hugely popular film." He also was highly negative about the video's technical quality, saying "the 3D version is just the old fashioned red and blue anaglyph system, and it comes unglued at the midway point – probably a by-product of Braun’s inability to properly shoot using 3D equipment" and that the standard version "is so dark that it almost completely obfuscates the action".

== Home media ==
The film was released on DVD and Blu-ray on September 28, 2010 and is believed to be "the first ever adult movie made specifically for 3-D televisions."

== Sequel ==
In 2012 a sequel was produced called This Ain't Avatar XXX 2: Escape from Pandwhora also directed by Axel Braun. The film was nominated for a Venus Award for "Best movie".

== Awards ==
- 2010 Venus Award - Special Jury Award Movie and Film
- 2011 AVN Award - Best 3D Release
- 2011 XBIZ Awards - Best Art Direction
- 2011 XBIZ Awards - Marketing Campaign of the Year

== See also ==
- Bat Pussy
- Batman: A Porn Parody
- Spider-Man: A Porn Parody
- Superman vs. Spider-Man: An Axel Braun Parody
