= Bikini Cavegirl =

- DVD cover for Bikini Cavegirl, released as Teenage Cavegirl (2004)
- Directed by: Fred Olen Ray (as Nicholas Medina)
- Written by: Fred Olen Ray (as Sherman Scott)
- Produced by: Kimberly A. Ray
- Starring: Jezebelle Bond
- Cinematography: J. Mallard
- Edited by: Dean McKendrick
- Production company: American Independent Productions
- Distributed by: New City Releasing; Retromedia Entertainment
- Release date: November 16, 2004
- Running time: 80 minutes
- Country: United States
- Language: English

Bikini Cavegirl (also known as Teenage Cavegirl) is a softcore pornographic film made by Fred Olen Ray under the pseudonyms "Nicholas Medina" and "Sherman Scott". It has been described as "a sexy makeover", but not a remake, of Ray's earlier film Dinosaur Island. It was released directly to video in 2004 under the title Teenage Cavegirl, and is shown on cable as Bikini Cavegirl.

== Plot ==
A prehistoric cavegirl named Tahra with a penchant for passion finds pleasure in the company of archeologists when she is accidentally transported to the future. There she encounters two archaeologists named Richard and Sharon. After several adventures, many of them sexual, Tahra's lover Tiko also finds his way to the future. Eventually, all of them are transported back to the time of Tahra.

== Cast ==
- Jezebelle Bond as Tahra
- Evan Stone as Tiko
- Voodoo as Richard
- Danielle Petty as Sharon
- Nicole Sheridan as Cynthia
- Jay Richardson as Dr. Matthews
- Lezley Zen as Girl In Car
- Trevor Zen as Guy In Car

== Critical appraisal ==
Under the title Teenage Cavegirl, the website Digitally Obsessed gives the film a middling review, commenting that its sex scenes are not explicit enough to be a good pornographic film, and yet there are too many of them to allow much plot development. The few amusing points of the film are said to include the title character's reaction to television commercials, and Jay Richardson's performance as an evil scientist. While noting that Fred Olen Ray is "one of the great genre directors", the review comments that his emphasis on non-explicit sex in this film hampers the possibility of enjoying the film as a "campy B-movie", "so one is left watching what is essentially porn without all the detail."

The cult-film website eccentric-cinema.com gives Teenage Cavegirl a rating of five stars out of ten. The site points out that Fred Olen Ray's stylistic interest in his film work is mainly in the drive-in atmosphere of the 1950s through 1970s. According to the review, Teenage Cavegirl satisfies the requirements of a sexploitation film of that era and genre. The film's lead actresses are attractive and are given many chances to show off their physical attributes in the film. One of the funnier aspects of the film is said to be its references to B-films such as Roger Corman's Teenage Cave Man (1958) and Gordon Scott Tarzan films. However, the weakness of the film is stated as that it is, "really just a series of sex scenes (six, in fact) interspersed with minuscule bits of goofy, extremely flimsy plot." The sex scenes are judged to be well-done, and it is speculated that Ray could have a good career in straight pornography if his interests were not in the softcore drive-in genre. Technically, the image quality of the film is judged to be excellent considering the low budget with which it was filmed.

In regards to the film's affectionate references to B-movies of the past, Rotten Tomatoes notes that Teenage Cavegirl was filmed in Bronson Canyon, known as the location for several exploitation classics. Rotten Tomatoes writes the film is "a hilarious, titillating romp".
