= Evan Stone =

American pornographic actor

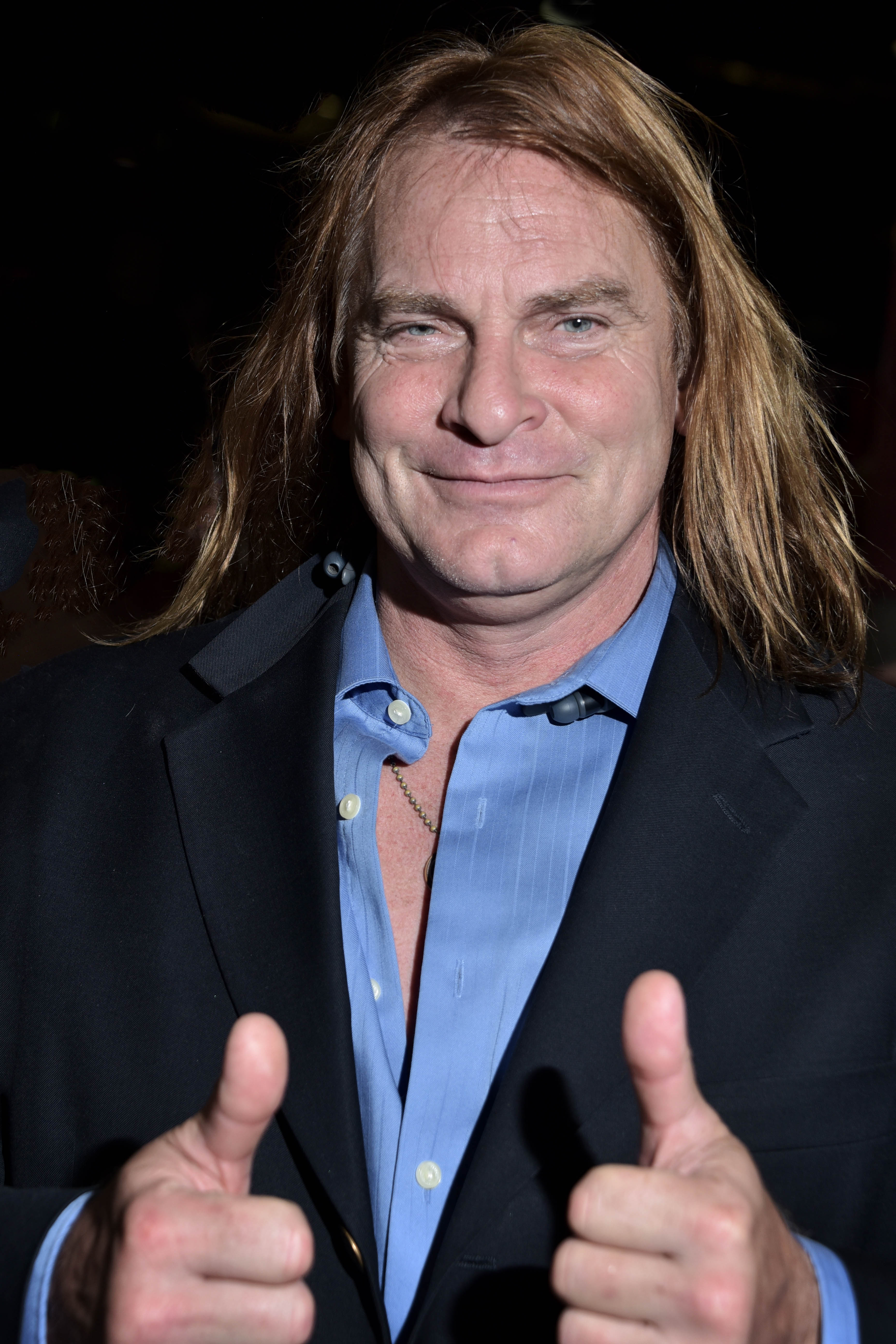
- Stone in 2017
- Born: Ames, Iowa, U.S.
- Education: Western Michigan University
- Occupation: Pornographic actor
- Years active: 1997–present
- Height: 5 ft 11 in (1.80 m)
- Spouse: Katie Morgan (m. 2017)
- Website: evanstone.com

Evan Stone is an American pornographic film actor and director.

In 2011, Stone became the third actor in history to receive the AVN Award for Male Performer of the Year three times. That same year, he was listed by CNBC as one of the twelve most popular stars in porn, being the only man to make the list. Stone has also been inducted into the AVN and XRCO Halls of Fame.

In June 2023, Stone announced he was running for Congress in Nevada as a Republican in the 1st District, however he lost the primary.

== Early life ==
Stone was born in Ames, Iowa. He was raised by his adoptive father, who worked as a firefighter, in Dallas, Texas. Stone is a 1982 graduate of Gobles High School in Gobles, Michigan. He played college football in the position of defensive lineman for the Western Michigan Broncos, an NCAA Division I team, but had to retire after suffering an injury. To make a living, he worked as a forklift driver, gas station attendant, dinner theatre performer, mechanic, and slaughterman at JBS.

== Career ==
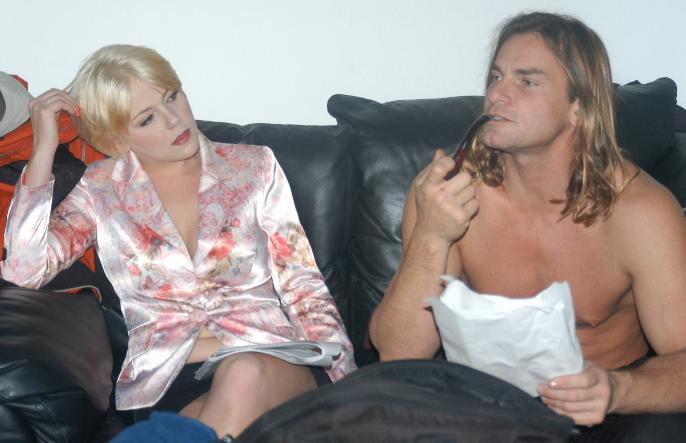
Stone (right) on set with Missy Monroe for the 2006 film Da Vinci Load

Stone entered the sex industry as an exotic dancer, which he did for ten years. In 1997, he began performing in adult films. Stone appeared as the monster in the 2001 parody film Hung Wankenstein. On January 1, 2001, he received the award for Male Performer of the Year at the 18th AVN Awards.

In February 2005, Stone replaced Julian as host of the cable television program Spice Hotel on Friday, Saturday, and Sunday evenings on Spice Live. The program focused on porn star couples. At the 25th AVN Awards, Stone received the honor of Male Performer of the Year for a second time.

On February 1, 2009, a 37-second clip of actress Tristan Kingsley performing oral sex on Stone, from the 2008 adult film Wild Cherries 5, was broadcast during Super Bowl XLIII to various Comcast subscribers in Tucson, Arizona. Comcast reported a significant economic loss due to the incident, and issued a monetary credit to approximately 80,000 subscribers. Following the incident, Stone reported that his website started averaging 20,000 hits daily.

In 2011, he was named by CNBC as one of the twelve most popular stars in porn, being the only man on the list. That same year, he received his third win for Male Performer of the Year at the 28th AVN Awards, becoming only the third performer in history to do so, after Lexington Steele and Manuel Ferrara, respectively. Months later, he made his directorial debut with the Hustler film TSA: Your Ass Is in Our Hands.

== Selected filmography ==
Year	Title	Role
1999	LA 399	Percy Blaine
2004	Bikini Cavegirl	Tiko
2004	Bikini Chain Gang	Tommy
2005	Lovers Lane	Andy Jones
2005	Pirates	Captain Edward Reynolds
2006	Ghost in a Teeny Bikini	Marsh
2006	Bikini Girls from the Lost Planet	Agent Decker
2007	Bewitched Housewives	Martin
2007	Debbie Does Dallas ... Again	Todd
2008	Bikini Royale	Parker Savage
2008	Pirates II: Stagnetti's Revenge	Captain Edward Reynolds
2008	Tarzeena, Queen of Kong Island	Jack Carver
2008	Who's Nailin' Paylin	The Professor
2009	Seinfeld: A XXX Parody	The Porn Nazi
2010	The Devil in Miss Jones: The Resurrection	Preacher
2010	Batman XXX: A Porn Parody	The Riddler
2010	The Human Sexipede	Merve
2010	This Ain't Avatar XXX	Quaritch
2011	This Ain't Ghostbusters XXX	Peter Venkman
2012	Dirty Blondes from Beyond	Jock

== Awards ==
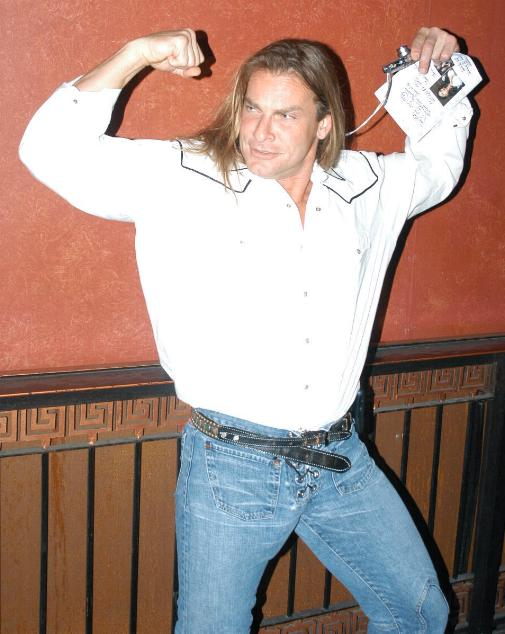
Stone at the 2007 XRCO Awards

List of accolades received by Evan Stone
Awards and honors
Award	Won	Honored
AVN Awards	10	1
NightMoves Awards	1	0
XBIZ Awards	2	0
XRCO Awards	4	1
Hot d'Or Awards	1	0
FAME Awards	3	0
- Total number of wins and honors
Totals	21	2

AVN Awards
Year	Category	Nominated work	Result	Ref(s)
2001	Male Performer of the Year	—N/a	Won	
2001	Best Actor, Film	Adrenaline	Won	
2004	Best Actor, Video	Space Nuts	Won	
2006	Best Actor, Video	Pirates	Won	
2007	Best Actor, Video	Sex Pix	Won	
2008	Male Performer of the Year	—N/a	Won	
2008	Best Group Sex Scene, Film	Debbie Does Dallas... Again	Won	
2009	Best Actor	Pirates II	Won	
2011	Best Supporting Actor	Batman XXX: A Porn Parody	Won	
2011	Male Performer of the Year	—N/a	Won	
2011	AVN Hall of Fame inductee	—N/a	Honored	

NightMoves Awards
Year	Category	Nominated work	Result	Ref(s)
2008	Best Male Performer, Editor's Choice	—N/a	Won	

Hot d'Or Awards
Year	Category	Nominated work	Result	Ref(s)
2009	Best American Actor	Pirates II	Won	

XBIZ Awards
Year	Category	Nominated work	Result	Ref(s)
2008	Male Performer of the Year	—N/a	Won	
2010	Acting Performance of the Year, Male	This Ain’t Star Trek	Won	

FAME Awards
Year	Category	Nominated work	Result	Ref(s)
2008	Favorite Male Star	—N/a	Won	
2009	Favorite Male Star	—N/a	Won	
2010	Favorite Male Star	—N/a	Won	

XRCO Awards
Year	Category	Nominated work	Result	Ref(s)
2001	Best Actor, Single Performance	Cap'N Mongo's Porno Playhouse	Won	
2008	Male Performer Of The Year	—N/a	Won	
2009	Single Performance, Actor	Pirates II	Won	
2010	Male Performer Of The Year	—N/a	Won	
2010	XRCO Hall of Fame inductee	—N/a	Honored	

== Electoral history ==
Nevada's 1st Congressional District Republican Primary 2024
Party	Candidate	Votes	%
Republican	Mark Robertson	14,102	48.2
Republican	Flemming Larsen	11,434	39.1
Republican	Jim Blockey	1,487	5.1
Republican	Michael Boris	1,279	4.4
Republican	Evan Stone	950	3.2
Total votes		29,252	100.0
