= Dale DaBone =

American pornographic actor and model (born 1972)

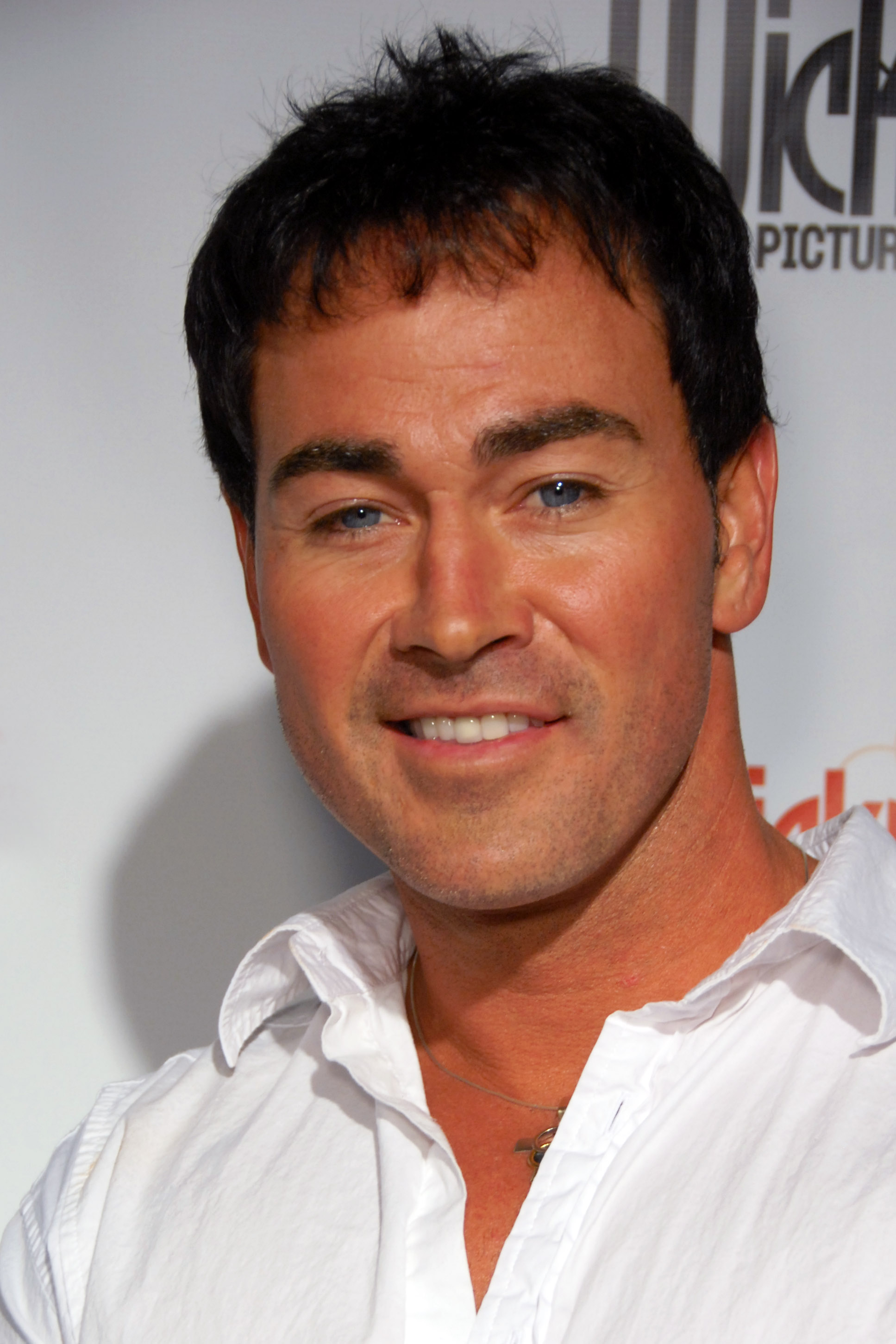
- DaBone at the 2011 XRCO Awards in Hollywood, California
- Born: January 8, 1972 (age 54); Greensboro, North Carolina, United States
- Height: 6 ft 0 in (1.83 m)

Dale DaBone (born January 8, 1972) is an American pornographic actor and director. He has appeared in more than 500 adult movies.

DaBone started in the adult film industry in 1998. DaBone had stepped away from the industry in 2003 and returned to the adult industry in 2010.

== Personal life ==
DaBone was born and raised in Greensboro, North Carolina. He dated professional tennis player Jennifer Capriati from 2003 to 2009.

== Select filmography ==
Title	Year	Role
Dangerous Sex Games	2005	Simon
Batman XXX: A Porn Parody	2010	Batman
This Ain't Avatar XXX	2010	Scientist
Naughty Reunion	2011	Jax Whitley

== Awards ==
- 2003 AVN Award – Best Actor in a Video (Betrayed By Beauty)
- 2004 AVN Award – Best Group Sex Scene in a Film (Fade To Black)
- 2011 XBIZ Award – Performer Comeback of the Year
- 2012 AVN Award – Best Actor (Elvis XXX: A Porn Parody)
