= Misjoinder =

In legal procedure (both civil and criminal), misjoinder (also known as wrongful joinder) involves the improper inclusion of one or more parties or causes of action within a lawsuit. The two forms of misjoinder are:

- Misjoinder of causes of action, or counts: joining several demands to enforce substantive rights of recovery that are distinct and contradictory.
- Misjoinder of parties: joining as plaintiffs or defendants persons who have conflicting interests, or who were not involved in the same transaction or event.

== United States ==
According to FRCP, Rule 21,

Misjoinder of parties is not a ground for dismissing an action. On motion or on its own, the court may at any time, on just terms, add or drop a party. The court may also sever any claim against a party.
