= Fairvilla =

Fairvilla is a chain of adult retail stores based in Orlando, Florida. It is owned by Bill Murphy and Shari Murphy.

== Background ==
Fairvilla opened its first location, called Fairvilla Twin Cinema, in 1971 in Orlando, Florida. Initially, it opened as a general theater, but, following the release of Deep Throat in 1972, it began showing adult soft-core features.

In 1991, Fairvilla Twin Cinema became Fairvilla Adult Video. The store added gifts, toys and lingerie and changed its name to reflect its expanded offerings, becoming Fairvilla Megastore in 1993. Fairvilla opened four additional locations in Florida.

In 1994, Murphy wanted to enlarge his store that was located on Orange Blossom Trail in the city limits of Orlando. He initially received the backing of city administrators (Departments of Zoning, etc.). However, later, they changed their minds after the outpouring of neighbors and churches and were denied his permits. Murphy sued and won against the city. The suit was won even in the appeals court. Murphy then sued the city for 1 million dollars. They settle the suit with Orlando city for $275,000

In 2002, when opening the third store, owner Bill Murphy filed a lawsuit against the city of Key West, because they refused to grant the store an adult business license. The store also met with some controversy when it opened its fourth store on the tourist-laden street International Drive in 2012.
