= Je Joue =

Sex toy company

- Industry: Sex toys
- Founded: 2008; 18 years ago
- Headquarters: London, United Kingdom
- Products: Vibrators, G-spot vibrators, vibrating cock rings and Kegel exercise balls
- Website: jejoue.com

Je Joue is a London-based luxury sex toy company that produces high end vibrators, G-spot vibrators, vibrating cock rings and Kegel exercise balls. Je Joue also has offices in China, Barcelona and US.

What makes Je Joue different is that they set the frequency of their toys lower than other vibrator manufacturers. Having a low-frequency vibrator gives a "rumbling" sensation, rather than a buzzy sensation. Low-frequency vibrations also carry through the body better, accessing parts of the clitoris that other vibrators do not reach.

== History ==
Je Joue was founded in 2008, the year in which the first toy, SaSi was released. In April 2009 SaSi was featured under "the cutting edge" section of "Modern Emotion" magazine: "SaSi is a totally unique product inspired by foreplay and it is, in actual fact, the only product on the market that uses movement as well as vibration as a form of clitoral stimulation." SaSi won the 2009 AVN 'O' award for Outstanding Innovation.

2009 saw the adjustable vibrator G-Ki to be released on the market. Clinical sexologist Megan Andelloux described the G-Ki “Variation of vibration, rounded tip, owner control with the degree of pressure delivered, medically sound materials that are hypoallergenic (and waterproof) and yet, still friendly for our planet. Yes the G-Ki is even green.” An improved G-Ki was released at the start of 2014 with a complete overhaul.

2010 launched Ami, the Je Joue version of Kegel exercise balls. This year MiMi was also released as an external vibrator.

2011 saw Uma as the specific G-spot vibrator followed shortly by FiFi which took on the style of the rabbit vibrator made famous by HBO's Sex and the City Season 1, Episode 9. More recently in 2012 Je Joue introduced Mio the vibrating cock rings designed for specific couples use. An addition to the MiMi family, MiMi Soft was released in 2013, with a softer tip for clientele with different tastes.

2015 saw Je Joue launch a new brand, Ooh by Je Joue. The brand is more affordable and taking a more eco-friendly approach, providing one vibrating motor that you can mix and match into several silicone sleeves to create various styles of vibrators.

2017 saw the release of a contemporary bullet collection with 3 different models. All priced at US$59, they are very affordable compared to some of its competitors like Lelo and We-Vibe.

== Recognition ==
Je Joue is often in the press for the best sex toys, as seen in Cosmopolitan, Marie Claire, etc. The Je Joue Mimi was voted "the best sex toy" in a 2014 survey by Good Housekeeping Magazine UK.
