= BatfXXX: Dark Night Parody =

- Directed by: Nicholas Steele
- Written by: Paul Chaplin
- Based on: The Dark Knight by Christopher Nolan
- Starring: Paul Chaplin; Nick Manning; Madelyn Marie; Krissy Lynn; Isis Love
- Cinematography: Fliktor; Butch
- Edited by: Darrell Van Dimes
- Production company: Bluebird Films
- Distributed by: Bluebird Films
- Release date: September 28, 2010
- Country: United States

BatfXXX: Dark Night Parody [sic] is a 2010 pornographic film from Bluebird Films that parodies The Dark Knight. It was directed by Nicholas Steele. The film was initially titled Batfucks, but it was renamed on August 19, 2010, prior to its release. Some of the film's scenes were shot in London.

== Cast ==
- Paul Chaplin as The Jo-Kerr
- Nick Manning as The Bat
- Madelyn Marie as Katwoman
- Krissy Lynn as Robina
- Isis Love as Batchick
- Anna Lovato as Gangster Lovato
- Esteban Fuentes as Rooftop Thug 1
- Craig Spivek as Rooftop Thug 2
- Phoenix Marie as Telethon Hostess
- Yurizan Beltran as Beauty Queen
- Katie Kox as Security Guard
- Jenny Hendrix as Cheerleader 1
- Brynn Tyler as Cheerleader 2
- Nika Noire as Female Clown Driver
- Blake Rose as Pilot in Box
- Kristina Rose as Stewardess in Box
- Rio Lee as Captured Hero
- Delta White as Gangster Girl 1
- Cindy Behr as Gangster Girl 2
- Jasmine Black as Gangster Girl 3
- Stacey Saran as Gangster Girl 4
- Kaia Kane as Gangster Waitress
- Demetri as Gangster Guy 1
- Ian Tate as Gangster Guy 2
- Jeff as Gangster Guy 3
- Tony Uttley as Gangster Guy 4
- Alexa Nicole as Kitka
- Mark Davis as Mayor
- Pike Nelson as Commissioner Gordon
- Mr. Pete as 2-Face
- Jazy Berlin as Lead Dancer
- Brooke Haven as Lap Dancer 2
- Brooke Banner as Lap Dancer 3
- Dylan Ryder as Lap Dancer 4
- Mason Moore as Lap Dancer 5
- Natalie Norton as Lap Dancer 6
- Tommy Gunn as Customer 1
- Aaron Wilcox as Customer 2
- Will Powers as Customer 3
- Danny Mountain as Customer 4
- Jamey Janes as Blonde Angel
- Andy San Dimas as Devil Girl
- David Perry as Mob Boss Moret
- Derrick Pierce as Mob Guard 1
- Chris Johnson as Mob Guard 2
- Carolyn Reese as Mob Girl 1
- Bobbi Starr as Mob Girl 2
- Danny Wylde as Punk Guy
- Dani Jensen as Punk Girl
- Tory Lane as Poisen Ivy

== Awards and nominations ==
Accolades received by BatfXXX: Dark Night Parody
Awards & nominations
Award	Won	Nominated
AVN Awards	6	10
XBIZ Awards	2	8
XRCO Awards	0	1
- Total number of wins and nominations
Totals	8	19
- References

Year	Ceremony	Result	Award	Recipient(s)
2011	AVN Award	Nominated	Best Actor	Paul Chaplin
2011	AVN Award	Won	Best Art Direction	—N/a
2011	AVN Award	Won	Best Cinematography/Videography	Fliktor & Butch
2011	AVN Award	Nominated	Best Director – Feature	Nicholas Steele
2011	AVN Award	Nominated	Best DVD Menus	—N/a
2011	AVN Award	Nominated	Best Editing	Darrell van Dimes
2011	AVN Award	Nominated	Best Group Sex Scene	Bobbi Starr, Dani Jensen, Madelyn Marie, Krissy Lynn, Carolyn Reese, Paul Chaplin, Derrick Pierce, Chris Johnson & Danny Wylde
2011	AVN Award	Won	Best Make-Up	Red Velvet, Rosa, Lisa Sloane & Melissa Makeup
2011	AVN Award	Nominated	Best Music Soundtrack	—N/a
2011	AVN Award	Won	Best Online Marketing Campaign – Individual Project	BatFXXX.com
2011	AVN Award	Nominated	Best Overall Marketing Campaign – Individual Project	—N/a
2011	AVN Award	Nominated	Best Packaging	—N/a
2011	AVN Award	Won	Best Parody – Drama	—N/a
2011	AVN Award	Nominated	Best Screenplay- Adapted	Paul Chaplin
2011	AVN Award	Won	Best Special Effects	—N/a
2011	AVN Award	Nominated	Best Supporting Actor	Nick Manning
2011	XBIZ Award	Nominated	Parody Release of the Year	—N/a
2011	XBIZ Award	Won	Director of the Year - Individual Project	Nicholas Steele
2011	XBIZ Award	Nominated	Acting Performance of the Year - Male	Paul Chaplin
2011	XBIZ Award	Nominated	Acting Performance of the Year - Male	Nick Manning
2011	XBIZ Award	Nominated	Screenplay of the Year	Paul Chaplin
2011	XBIZ Award	Nominated	Best Cinematography	Fliktor & Butch
2011	XBIZ Award	Nominated	Best Art Direction	—N/a
2011	XBIZ Award	Won	Best Special Effects	—N/a
2011	XBIZ Award	Nominated	Best Editing	Darrell van Dimes
2011	XBIZ Award	Nominated	Marketing Campaign of the Year	—N/a
2011	XRCO Award	Nominated	Best Parody - Drama	—N/a

== See also ==
- Bat Pussy
- Batman XXX
