= Axel Braun =

Italian adult film director (born 1966)

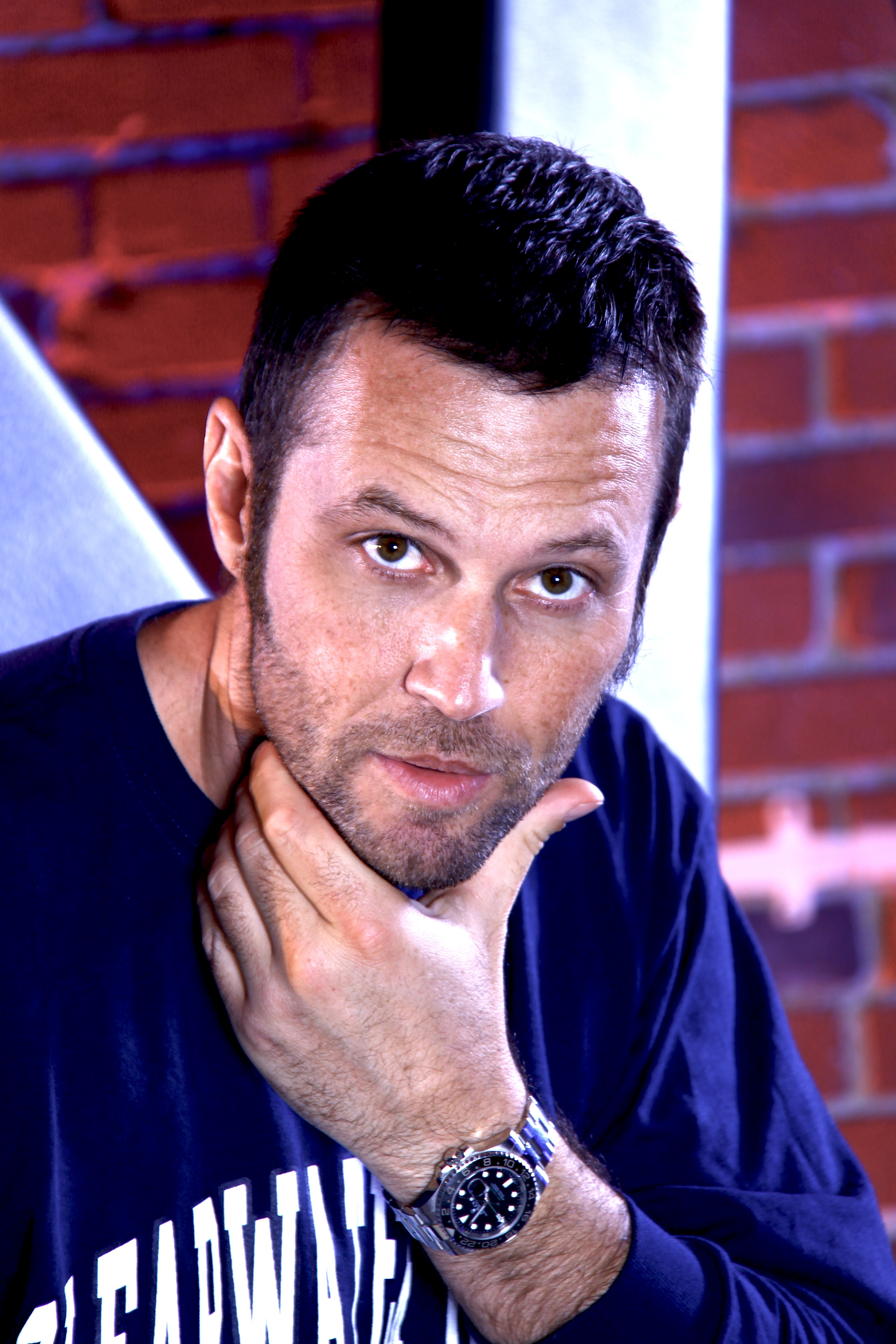
- Braun in October 2010
- Born: September 22, 1966 (age 60); Milan, Italy
- Years active: 1990–present
- Children: Rikki Braun
- Website: axelbraun.com

Axel Braun (born September 22, 1966) is an Italian-American adult film producer and director known for his productions of pornographic parodies. He is the most awarded director in the history of adult films.

The son of Lasse Braun, he is an AVN Hall of Fame, XRCO Hall of Fame and NightMoves Hall of Fame inductee.

== Early life ==
Axel was born and raised in Milan, Italy. He attended film school at Columbia College Hollywood.

== Career ==
Braun has directed over 500 movies since 1990. Braun's movie Batman XXX: A Porn Parody was the best-selling and best-renting title of 2010. Due to the success of Batman XXX, Vivid Entertainment created a new line to capitalize on the superhero and sci-fi genres called Vivid Superhero and Braun was named leading director for the initiative. In 2013, Braun left Vivid and signed an exclusive directing contract with Wicked Pictures to launch Wicked Fairy Tales and Wicked Comix, two imprints dedicated exclusively to fairy tale and comic book parodies.

In December 2020, following the acquisition of Wicked Pictures by Gamma Entertainment, Braun was appointed Head of Production for the company. On June 23, 2023, Braun announced his retirement from the adult industry after a career spanning 33 years.

== Advocacy ==
In October 2010, Braun filed a federal lawsuit against 7,098 individuals who he alleged illegally shared digital copies of his movie Batman XXX: A Porn Parody.

In October 2013, Braun instated a policy that required all performers appearing in sexually explicit roles in any of his movies to be 21 years of age, or older.

In May 2014, Braun announced two new policies for his productions. First, he would no longer forgo the use of condoms in his videos. Second, he will require full-panel STD/HIV tests no older than seven days. He added that he would personally cover the cost for the test if a performer's current test is older.

== Recognition ==
Braun was inducted into the AVN Hall of Fame in 2011 and into the XRCO Hall of Fame in 2014. He has won the AVN Best Parody award for ten consecutive years in 2011, 2012, 2013, 2014, 2015, 2016, 2017, 2018, 2019, and 2020. Braun is the only adult director to have won the AVN Director of the Year award four consecutive times in 2011, 2012, 2013 and 2014.

In January 2015, 24 XXX: An Axel Braun Parody became the first parody ever to win the AVN Movie of the Year award. Braun won the top award again in 2016 with Peter Pan XXX: An Axel Braun Parody, and in 2017 with Suicide Squad XXX: An Axel Braun Parody scoring an unprecedented AVN Movie of the Year three-peat.

In 2019, Braun won the AVN Movie of the Year for a fourth time with The Possession of Mrs. Hyde, his first non-parody feature in 15 years, written with his father Lasse Braun and his son Rikki, and shot entirely in Black and White CinemaScope.

== Other ventures ==
Braun is the owner of Level 5 Post, a post-production company that supplies editing, authoring, graphics and special effects to many adult and mainstream companies.

== Selected awards ==
List of accolades received by Axel Braun
Awards and honors
Award	Won	Honored
AVN Awards	18	1
NightMoves Awards	1	2
XBIZ Awards	5	0
XRCO Awards	6	1
Ninfa Awards	1	0
- Total number of wins and honors
Totals	31	4

AVN Awards
Year	Category	Nominated work
2004	Best Screenplay	Compulsion
2011	AVN Hall of Fame inductee	—N/a
2011	Director of the Year	—N/a
2011	Best Screenplay	Batman XXX: A Porn Parody
2012	Director of the Year	—N/a
2013	Director of the Year	—N/a
2013	Director of the Year	—N/a
2013	Best Director-Parody	
2013	Best Screenplay	Star Wars XXX: A Porn Parody
2014	Director of the Year	—N/a
2015	Best Director/Parody	—N/a
2015	Best Screenplay	24 XXX: An Axel Braun Parody
2016	Best Director/Parody	—N/a
2016	Best Screenplay	Batman v Superman XXX: An Axel Braun Parody
2017	Best Screenplay	Suicide Squad XXX: An Axel Braun Parody
2017	Best Director/Parody	—N/a
2018	Best Director/Feature	—N/a
2019	Best Director/Feature	—N/a
2019	Best Screenplay	The Possession of Mrs. Hyde

XBIZ Awards
Year	Category	Nominated work
2010	Director of the Year-Body of Work	—N/a
2013	Director of the Year – Parody	Star Wars XXX: A Porn Parody
2014	Director of the Year-Body of Work	—N/a
2016	Director of the Year-Parody	—N/a

NightMoves Awards
Year	Category	Nominated work
2010	Best Director (Editor's Choice)	—N/a
2012	NightMoves Lifetime Achievement Award	—N/a
2014	NightMoves Hall of Fame inductee	—N/a

Ninfa Awards
Year	Category	Nominated work
2004	Best Director	Compulsión

XRCO Awards
Year	Category
2011	Best Director-Parody
2012	Best Director-Parody
2013	Best Director-Parody
2014	XRCO Hall of Fame inductee

== See also ==
- Porn parody
