= Bat Pussy =

1970s American pornographic parody film by an anonymous director, released in 1996

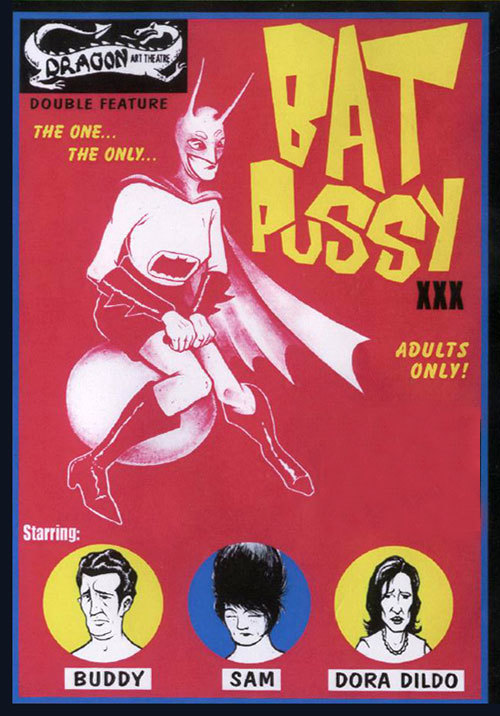
- DVD cover illustrated by Matt Allison
- Distributed by: Something Weird Video
- Running time: 50 minutes
- Country: United States
- Language: English

Bat Pussy is an American pornographic film, believed to have been produced in the early 1970s. Ostensibly a spoof of the 1966–1968 Batman television series, it has been cited as the earliest example of a pornographic parody film and more infamously considered to be the worst pornographic film ever made.

Released in relative obscurity and near-anonymity, Bat Pussy was discovered in the storeroom of a Memphis, Tennessee adult movie theater in the mid-1990s and subsequently issued on home video by exploitation film distributor Something Weird Video. No credits or copyright information were found on the print, and as a result, nothing is known for certain about its production or who was involved; it is not known who made the film or stars in it. Since its video release, it has attracted a cult following among exploitation and pornography fans for its perceived poor quality, with most reviews criticizing its technical flaws, dialogue, and the lead actors, who are known only by the names they receive in the film itself.

== Plot ==
Set in Gotham City, the plot of Bat Pussy focuses on married couple Buddy and Sam in the bedroom of a small apartment. While reading an issue of Screw magazine, Buddy is inspired to experiment with oral sex on Sam and the two spend the remainder of the film together in bed, alternating between cunnilingus, fingering and fellatio, despite Buddy's visibly and perpetually flaccid penis. Throughout these scenes, Buddy and Sam continually insult each other and argue over their sexual performance.

Meanwhile, across town at Bat Pussy's Secret Warehouse Hideout, Bat Pussy's alter ego Dora Dildo awaits for her "super senses" to alert her to nearby trouble – the film's sole bit of narration explains that she can sense crime "when her twat begins to twitch". Angrily sensing that someone is about to "shoot a fuck movie" in her "holy Gotham City" without her, she proceeds to change into her Bat Pussy outfit and slowly travel across the city (which is actually a park) on an inflatable space hopper. She stops to urinate behind some bushes and thwart an assault by beating the attacker with her space hopper.

Back at Buddy and Sam's, Buddy starts taking pictures of Sam's vagina to sell and "make a fortune" with when Bat Pussy breaks into their room and confronts them. They engage in a threesome involving the use of a dildo until Bat Pussy abruptly gets up from the bed, takes her costume, and walks out, leaving Sam and Buddy to bicker and argue again. The film ends with Bat Pussy returning to her hideout in a dishevelled state and collapsing outside it.

== Discovery and release ==
Virtually nothing is known about the production of Bat Pussy, as the film bears no credits and no names have been publicly associated with the film. There is no known record of Bat Pussy's existence prior to the 1990s, when musician and filmmaker Mike McCarthy (known for creating the 2009 film Cigarette Girl) discovered roughly 200 boxes of vintage Super 8 and 16 mm pornographic films and porn loops in the back room of the Paris adult movie theater in Memphis, Tennessee, among which was a 600-foot 16mm reel labeled "BATPUSSY". McCarthy contacted Mike Vraney, founder of exploitation film distributor Something Weird Video, and Vraney purchased the Paris Theater's collection for $1000.

Despite being found in Tennessee, it is uncertain where Bat Pussy was filmed. Based on the actors' heavy Southern accents, McCarthy believes the film was shot in the "Mid-South area": "That is to say, around Memphis, Tennessee (or nearby Arkansas, Alabama, or Mississippi)". In a 2013 interview with Seattle Weekly about the documentary film That's Sexploitation!, in which Bat Pussy is briefly featured, Vraney mentioned that the film was likely made in Texas, saying "I love sexploitation movies made in Texas, just because these girls have these amazing accents. In Bat Pussy, that girl's accent is hilarious". Following the film's 2K restoration, it was discovered that the actor who plays "Buddy" has an Arkansas Razorbacks tattoo on his buttock.

The year of Bat Pussy's production is also of debate. Although the Internet Movie Database and the Internet Adult Film Database both list a year of 1973, Something Weird more vaguely dates it as "1970s". The issue of Screw magazine which Buddy is reading from at the beginning of the film has a cover date of September 14, 1970.

Something Weird released Bat Pussy on VHS in 1996 as a double feature with the 1973 film Baby Bubbles, forming volume 23 of "Bucky Beaver's Dragon Art Theatre Triple XXX-Rated Double Feature". This version of Bat Pussy is preceded by a vintage theatrical introduction to the Dragon Art Theater by theater owner and exploitation film producer Donn Davison, though it is uncertain whether Bat Pussy actually played at the Dragon Art Theater. The Bat Pussy/Baby Bubbles double feature was later reissued as a print on demand DVD-R in 2007, and as of 2017, is also available as a digital download through the Something Weird website.

On November 10, 2016, the American Genre Film Archive announced it would be partnering with Something Weird Video to release a 2K restoration of Bat Pussy on Blu-ray the following year. After nearly a year's worth of restoration, a press release was published on September 20, 2017, announcing a release date of October 17, alongside a humorous emphasis that the film had been banned from sale on Amazon.com due to its pornographic content. The restored print of Bat Pussy made its world premiere at the Fantastic Fest film festival in Austin, Texas on September 23, 2017. Bat Pussy was released on Blu-ray on October 17, 2017, featuring audio commentary by members of the Something Weird and American Genre Film Archive, liner notes by McCarthy and Something Weird's Lisa Petrucci, several archival shorts and trailers from the Something Weird vaults and the 1971 pornographic short Robot Sex Slaves as a bonus film.

On February 14, 2019, the American Genre Film Archive announced that Something Weird's Lisa Petrucci had located a second 16mm copy which included footage missing from the ending of the previously found print. The American Genre Film Archive reissued their Blu-ray release on December 1, 2022 to include a new preservation based on the discovered print.

== Reception ==
Since its initial video release, Bat Pussy has achieved cult status as the worst pornographic movie ever made, with Gawker Media's io9 proclaiming it "the absolute nadir of pornography, period. Not just Batman-themed pornography. ALL pornography". In a 2014 interview, Tim Lewis, the general manager of Something Weird Video, selected Bat Pussy as the one film "so nuts it has to be seen to be believed" out of Something Weird's entire catalog of over 2,500 schlock and exploitation films, mentioning it was "only for the truly jaded adult film viewer".

"[T]hanks to some incredibly unarousing sex and a general attitude of awfulness", nearly every aspect of Bat Pussy has been heavily criticized. General critiques of the film involved its acting, technical quality and the slipshod nature of its low-budget production: for example, the director can be heard giving actors various directions throughout the film, while a crew member can be heard belching during one of the sex scenes. In the final scene, Buddy frequently refers to Bat Pussy as "Batwoman" before being corrected by the other actor. Some of Bat Pussy's harshest criticisms were often focused on the perceived unattractiveness of the film's actors, who play Buddy and Sam. PornParody.com wrote that they were "physically unappealing specimens [...] even by the looser standards of 1970s porn" and AV Maniacs bluntly described them as "two white trash, out of shape, drunk on Schlitz yokels". Something Weird Video described the two actors' seemingly unscripted dialogue—consisting mostly of insults and vulgar non sequiturs such as "My horoscope says I'm going to fuck you in the nose"—as "almost surreal", likening it to the "babbling" of "two escaped mental patients".

The largest area of criticism was placed on Bat Pussy's sex scenes, which have been heavily derided as unappealing and unerotic, and include Buddy's visible impotence. Multiple reviewers have labeled Bat Pussy "anti-porn" for its "unarousing" depiction of sex and nudity. Brad Jones of The Cinema Snob called it both "anti-porn" and "anti-sexy", while AV Maniacs agreed with the "anti-porn" title and contested its categorization as pornography, as "there is no discernible 'fucking' in it" and it "completely and utterly fails to elicit even the minutest amount of arousal in its viewers". The Snipe concurred, describing Bat Pussy as "the boner-killer of all time [...] Only a psychopath or possibly a replicant could withstand let alone enjoy a document so barren or unflinching in its contempt for humanity." Radiation-Scarred Reviews wrote "This is the sort of sex film you show teenagers to encourage abstinence because it just makes the act of fornication seem so repulsive, so utterly disgusting that it seems unthinkable to perform". Cult film website Movies About Girls concurred that it "does not work, on any level" but was nevertheless "stunningly weird, grubby, and ugly, an unintentionally hilarious bit of homespun cinematic folk-art so senseless, so maddeningly random in its execution that it very nearly approaches some sort of terrible genius".

Following Bat Pussy's Blu-ray release in 2017, a resurgence of reviews from cult movie websites further solidified the film's sordid reputation among genre fans. Cinapse dubbed it "The Room of porno", "definitely hilarious in a so-bad-it's-good way" and a "gloriously amazing car crash of a film", while Deadline Hollywood considered it "one of the most sought-after lost films in the history of exploitation cinema", describing it as "what happens when your wildest dreams and most horrifying nightmares collide in an explosion of flaccid stupefaction". Cinepunx, admitting the film was "exceptionally, peerlessly excruciating... a fleshy, unsightly Groundhog Day of torturous porn purgatory", called it a "genuinely fascinating time capsule of regional filmmaking", noting "any fan of oddball trash cinema owes themselves at least one viewing of this strange, cinematic car crash". FilmMonthly singled out Bat Pussy as "a bizarre artifact", "unquestionably one of the strangest, most mysterious, and most outrageously entertaining" titles in Something Weird's archives and "spectacularly un-erotic", calling it a "must-have" for exploitation fans. Birth. Movies. Death., however, was less enthusiastic, acknowledging "it's difficult to describe just how fucking bad it is" but claiming "the absurdity wears out its welcome rather quickly" and concluding "Bat Pussy is nothing more than a morbid curio for those who have seen it all – a campfire tale whose origins are probably best left to the imagination".

On a slightly more positive angle, Bat Pussy has been cited by both The Daily Telegraph and io9 as one of the earliest known examples of a pornographic parody film. PornParody.com, a website dedicated to reviewing porn parodies, considers Bat Pussy to be either the first or the earliest known surviving example of a superhero pornographic parody film, a category which has since become a major subgenre of pornographic films following the success of 2010's Batman XXX: A Porn Parody by the superhero-based adult film company Vivid Superhero. However, reviewers have also criticized the parody aspects of Bat Pussy: the book The Many More Lives of Batman edited by William Uricchio, Will Brooker and Roberta Pearson—also describing it as "the worst porn ever made"—wrote that the film contains none of the core components of the character beyond "a pun in the title and a limited attempt to recreate some of the recognizable costumes".

== See also ==
- BatfXXX: Dark Night Parody
- List of 20th century films considered the worst
