= Capri Anderson =

American pornographic film actress (born 1988)

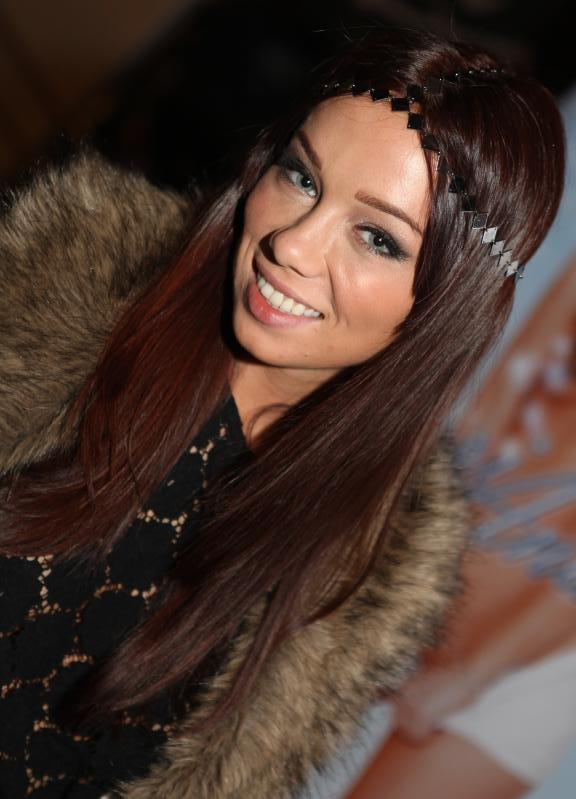
- Anderson in 2012
- Born: Christina Walsh; 1987 or 1988 (age 38–39)
- Occupation: Pornographic film actress

Christina Walsh (born 1987 or 1988), known professionally as Capri Anderson, is an American pornographic film actress.

== Legal issues ==
In October 2010, police found Anderson locked in a bathroom in the hotel room of actor Charlie Sheen at New York City's Plaza Hotel. In November, Sheen sued Anderson for extortion, claiming that she asked for $1 million to keep her story out of the press. Anderson later told ABC News that Sheen had been intoxicated and had threatened to kill her. She said she hid in the bathroom for fear of her safety.

== Filmography ==
Year	Film	Role	Notes
2007	Bang Bus		TV series
2007	Pure 18		TV series
2008	Bangbros Clips		TV series
2008	In the VIP		TV series
2009	Power Munch		TV series
2009	Kin8tengoku		TV series
2010	I Know That Girl		TV series
2009–2010	We Live Together		TV series
2010	Real Slut Party		TV series
2010	Hot and Mean		TV series
2012	TeamSkeet Extras		TV series
2012	When Girls Play		TV series
2012	Elegant Angel		TV series
2013	Criminal Desires		TV series
2016	Girlsway Originals		TV series

== Awards ==
- 2013: Best Supporting Actress for Pee-Wee's XXX Adventure: A Porn Parody
