= Pornographic parody film =

Subgenre of pornographic films

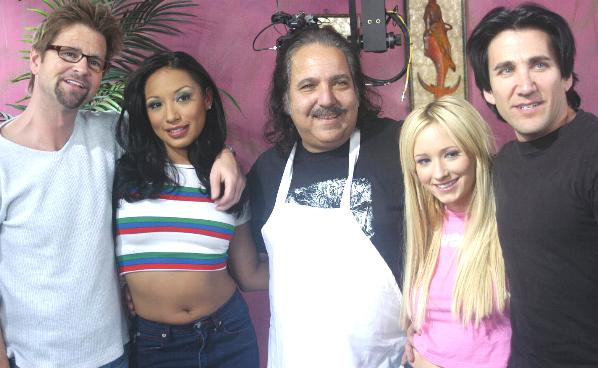
Will Ryder, Jasmine Byrne, Ron Jeremy, Hillary Scott and Scott David on the set of Not The Bradys XXX, a porn parody of The Brady Bunch, in 2006

A pornographic parody film is a subgenre of the pornographic film industry genre where the basis for the production's story or plotline is the parody of a mainstream television show, feature film, public figure, video game or literary works. This subgenre also includes parody of historical or contemporary events such as political scandals. The subgenre has gained acceptance by the adult industry to the extent that major awards are presented in this category by organizations such as AVN and XRCO.

== Origin ==
PornParody.com, a website dedicated to reviewing porn parodies, cites the Batman spoof Bat Pussy (c. 1970) as possibly the earliest known pornographic parody film, a title which is also shared with the 1973 German animated short Snow White and the Seven Perverts. The subgenre began taking off in the 1990s, experiencing a surge in popularity during the 2000s and 2010s. William Shakespeare's works have been used as inspiration, titles include Hamlet: For the Love of Ophelia and Othello: Dangerous Desire.

== Types ==
In 2002, Shaving Ryan's Privates, a movie starring actor-turned-infosec analyst Jeff Bardin, was released. The movie documented porn films that parody classic Hollywood movies. There have been porn parodies produced of sitcoms such as Who's The Boss and Parks and Recreation, horror and drama movies such as Edward Scissorhands and The Silence of the Lambs, sci-fi and action movie blockbusters such as Star Wars and The Avengers, and of period drama such as Downton Abbey, titled Down on Abby. The genre includes both heterosexual and homosexual versions, such as a "gay porn parody" of the reality television series Duck Dynasty. Parodies also include non-story or event specific productions such as the porn parody film Who's Nailin' Paylin? that features characters impersonating the real life politicians Sarah Palin, Hillary Clinton, and Condoleezza Rice as well as media figure Bill O'Reilly.

== Production ==
Some parodies use techniques such as CGI. One movie reviewer commented that the costume of a particular comic book character in a porn parody was a "better version" of the one used in the mainstream movie.

== Reception and review ==
Journalist and author Charlie Jane Anders wrote, before blogging on the subject, "I didn't realize just how many porn parodies there are — and how terrible most of them actually are."

A New York magazine writer commented that although the parody of the PBS series Downton Abbey titled Down on Abby starring Lexi Lowe is humorous, it is "rife with historical inaccuracies" and "not recommended for those who get distracted by historically inaccurate details like squared-off French tips and thongs."

=== Industry acceptance ===
Acknowledging its origins and public appeal, several industry publications and trade groups have created award categories for the genre. Two of the industry's major award programs offer recognition for this category of adult film.

The AVN Award added the categories of "Best Parody - Comedy" and "Best Parody - Drama" in 2009. In 2013, the Star Wars parody Star Wars XXX: A Porn Parody was that year's most nominated production as well as the winner of the Comedy category. In 2012, the category of "Best Director" for a "Parody and Best Celebrity Sex Tape" was added.

The XRCO Award added its category of "Best Parody" in 2003. Coincidentally, the award went to the Wicked Pictures-produced and Jonathan Morgan-directed film Space Nuts, a parody of the Mel Brooks film Spaceballs - itself a parody of Star Wars. Space Nuts also won the 2004 AVN award for Best Parody - Comedy.

=== Mainstream media ===
The genre has gained the attention of the mainstream press. In 2009 director Jeff Mullen (a.k.a. Will Ryder) was interviewed by Newsweek writer Joshua Alston about his leading role in the resurgence of porn parodies.

In 2009, Adult Video News writer Tom Hymes observed, "I have come to the realization that a very real expectation is being created among the celebrity elite: Will my show be the next XXX parody... please?" "What is kind of brilliant about the whole thing is the fact that these mainstream shows and the actors on them now get to rub shoulders with the porn industry without any actual rubbing. That's why I call them the new celebrity-safe sex tapes for safe-sex celebrities." Alan Ball, creator of the HBO series True Blood stated in 2010 that "We just found out that they're doing a porn parody of True Blood. That's certainly a moment of going 'Wow, we've arrived.'"

In 2010, actress Anna Paquin talked about the porn parody of True Blood on the late night talk show Lopez Tonight. Paquin said "You know, actually what's interesting is that [fellow cast member] Steve [Moyer] and I were so amused by it that we got it for everyone on our cast and crew as a wrap gift so I think we probably bought every copy in existence." Copies of Tru: A XXX Parody were given to the entire cast and crew at the wrap party for the show's third season.

== Fictional pornography ==
Fictional pornography is sometimes used for plot or humor in mainstream film and TV. In Friends, Phoebe's twin sister starred in Buffay, the Vampire Layer among others. Lyndsey in Two and a Half Men was the title role of Cinnamon's Buns, and Wilson in House acted in Feral Pleasures. Peter Stormare's character in The Big Lebowski can be seen in Logjammin'.

== See also ==
- Axel Braun, director known for parody productions
- Tijuana bible, pornographic comic books that often featured parodies of comic strips, cartoons and celebrities
- Rule 34 (Internet meme)
- Slash fiction
