= Porno Valley =

- Also known as: Vivid Valley
- Narrated by: Dani Behr
- Countries of origin: United States; United Kingdom
- Original language: English
- No. of seasons: 1
- No. of episodes: 13 (list of episodes)

Production
- Running time: 30 minutes
- Production company: World of Wonder

Original release
- Network: Sky1; Playboy TV
- Release: 11 January – 4 April 2004

Porno Valley (also released as Vivid Valley in some territories) is a documentary series that aired from 11 January 2004, to 4 April 2004. This 13 part series follows the Vivid girls for 6 months. They present their work, their dreams and the daily life. They face the trouble in their relationships resulting out of their work, as well as the glamorous moments in their careers.

In the UK, it was broadcast on Sky Television. In the US the series aired on Playboy TV and the Independent Film Channel (IFC), and in Italy it previously aired on Cielo and Campania's Canale 21. Reruns currently air on the Salerno-based TV Oggi since September 4, 2026 with episodes being released on a weekly basis, under license from the series' current distributor Sapphire Media International.

== Premise ==
This documentary series followed girls under contract with Vivid Entertainment.

== Cast ==
- Steven Hirsch
- Sunrise Adams
- Jenna Jameson
- Nina Mercedez
- Briana Banks
- Savanna Samson

== Episodes ==
No.	Title	Original release date	American release date
1	"Mercedez Bends"	11 January 2004	1 October 2005
Tawny Roberts dumps her boyfriend after becoming a Vivid Girl. Mercedez enjoys spending time with her new co-star. The CEO of Vivid auditions five new girls.
2	"Titsicle"	18 January 2004	8 October 2005
Briana Banks wants to reduce her breast size. Vivid gets requests from many people who want to be porn stars. Sunrise Adams is suddenly cast in a scene, when another girl doesn't show up.
3	"Tightie Whities"	25 January 2004	15 October 2005
The two finalists in the audition will get a final evaluation in a girl on girl scene. Jenna Jameson finds out that the director has made some changes to the script.
4	"A Penny For Your Thong"	1 February 2004	22 October 2005
Penny Antine, screenwriter and stylist, leaves early and takes the costume that Savanna was going to use in her next scene. Tawny's vagina is used as a model for a new sex toy.
5	"A Star is Pron"	8 February 2004	29 October 2005
Savanna finally has the chance to do a big production. Mercedez goes on an exotic dancing tour. Kelle Marie has sex with another man, against her boyfriend's wishes.
6	"Legally Blonde"	15 February 2004	5 November 2005
Mercedez has news for her boyfriend. Sunrise's boyfriend is not happy with her choice of a career.
7	"Family Values"	22 February 2004	12 November 2005
The families of the stars tell the camera what they really think. Sunrise has a doctors appointment.
8	"Do the Hustle"	29 February 2004	19 November 2005
Steve Hirsch and Larry Flynt battles for control of the porn industry. Briana invites Tawny over to her house for dinner.
9	"Come West, Young Man"	7 March 2004	26 November 2005
A 20-year-old girl is invited to audition. Director David Stanley has sex with all the stars, but falls in love with one of the girls.
10	"The Pussy and the Paycheck"	14 March 2004	3 December 2005
Jenna Jameson has to do an English accent for her next film. Kira Kener's new co-star goes limp.
11	"Last Girl Standing"	21 March 2004	10 December 2005
The next big movie, Last Girl Standing, goes into production. Savanna's co-star doesn't show up. Mercedez doesn't want to do the movie.
12	"Peace and Love"	28 March 2004	17 December 2005
It's time to do the all-girls scene in Last Girl Standing. The girls play a game of truth or dare.
13	"Best New Nymphomaniac"	4 April 2004	31 December 2005
Not everyone can make it in the adult film industry.

== See also ==
- Family Business
- Pornucopia
- Wadd: The Life & Times of John C. Holmes
- Porn Star: The Legend of Ron Jeremy
