= 25th AVN Awards =

US adult industry award ceremony in 2008

- Tera Patrick on the event's poster.
- Date: January 12, 2008
- Site: Mandalay Bay Events Center; Paradise, Nevada, USA
- Hosted by: Tera Patrick; Greg Fitzsimmons

Highlights
- Best Picture: Layout

Television coverage
- Network: Showtime

The 25th AVN Awards was an event during which Adult Video News (AVN) presented its annual AVN Awards to honor the best pornographic movies and adult entertainment products of 2007 in the United States.

The ceremony was held on January 12, 2008, at the Mandalay Bay Events Center, in Paradise, Nevada.

== Ceremony ==
The 25th Anniversary Adult Video News awards made its broadcast premiere on Showtime on March 14. The two-hour presentation, billed as The AVN Adult Movie Awards, was taped on January 12 at the Mandalay Bay Events Center in Paradise, Nevada. For the first time the show was shot on High-Definition and was also broadcast in that format.

AVN announced nominations for its annual awards on November 26, 2007. Nominees in the 114 categories were selected by the AVN staff, and winners were selected by AVN writers and other adult film reviewers.

Leaders in nominations were Upload, a science-fiction thriller video from SexZ Pictures, with 22 nominations, and Layout, a film from Vivid Entertainment, with 18. This is the last year for separate film and video categories at the AVN awards.

Performer/director Belladonna received nine nominations, for Best Director (Non-Feature), Director of the Year and seven sex scenes. Performer/director Stormy Daniels received seven nominations, for acting, directing, screenplay, Director of the Year, Female Performer of the Year, Crossover Star of the Year, and Couples Sex Scene with veteran performer Randy Spears.

Spears himself received five nominations, including Best Actor (Video), Best Supporting Actor (Film) and Male Performer of the Year; performer Steven St. Croix received five, four for acting and one sex scene; performer/director Brad Armstrong received four, for acting, screenplay, and two for direction.

Wicked Pictures and its affiliated companies led the nominations count with 91, followed by Evil Angel Productions and its affiliates with 88, Vivid Entertainment and its affiliates with 84, Pure Play Media and its affiliates with 48, Digital Playground and its affiliates with 41, JM Productions and its affiliates with 39, Elegant Angel Productions with 33, Adam & Eve Pictures and its affiliates with 32 and Hustler Video and its affiliates with 31.

This year's additions to the AVN Hall of Fame are performers Brittany Andrews, Jay Ashley, Angel Kelly, Dyanna Lauren, Raylene, Ruby, Alexandra Silk, Angela Summers and Tasha Voux, performer/director Skye Blue, cameraman Jake Jacobs and director Michael Raven.

=== Changes in categories ===
The 25th annual AVN Awards was the last at which productions shot on film are divided into separate categories from those shot on video. This change comes due to the very few number of companies producing films.

AVN president Paul Fishbein stated, "If people make films, they'll be eligible in every category, and if there are enough of them, then we'll have a separate Best Film category."

The AVN Award categories that have until this year been divided up into film and video are: Best Actor, Best Actress, Best All-Girl Sex Scene, Best Anal Sex Scene, Best Art Direction, Best Cinematography/Videography, Best Couples Sex Scene, Best Director, Best Editing, Best Group Sex Scene, Best Oral Sex Scene, Best Screenplay, Best Supporting Actor and Best Supporting Actress.

== Main awards ==
Winners of categories announced during the awards ceremony on January 12, 2008, are highlighted in boldface.

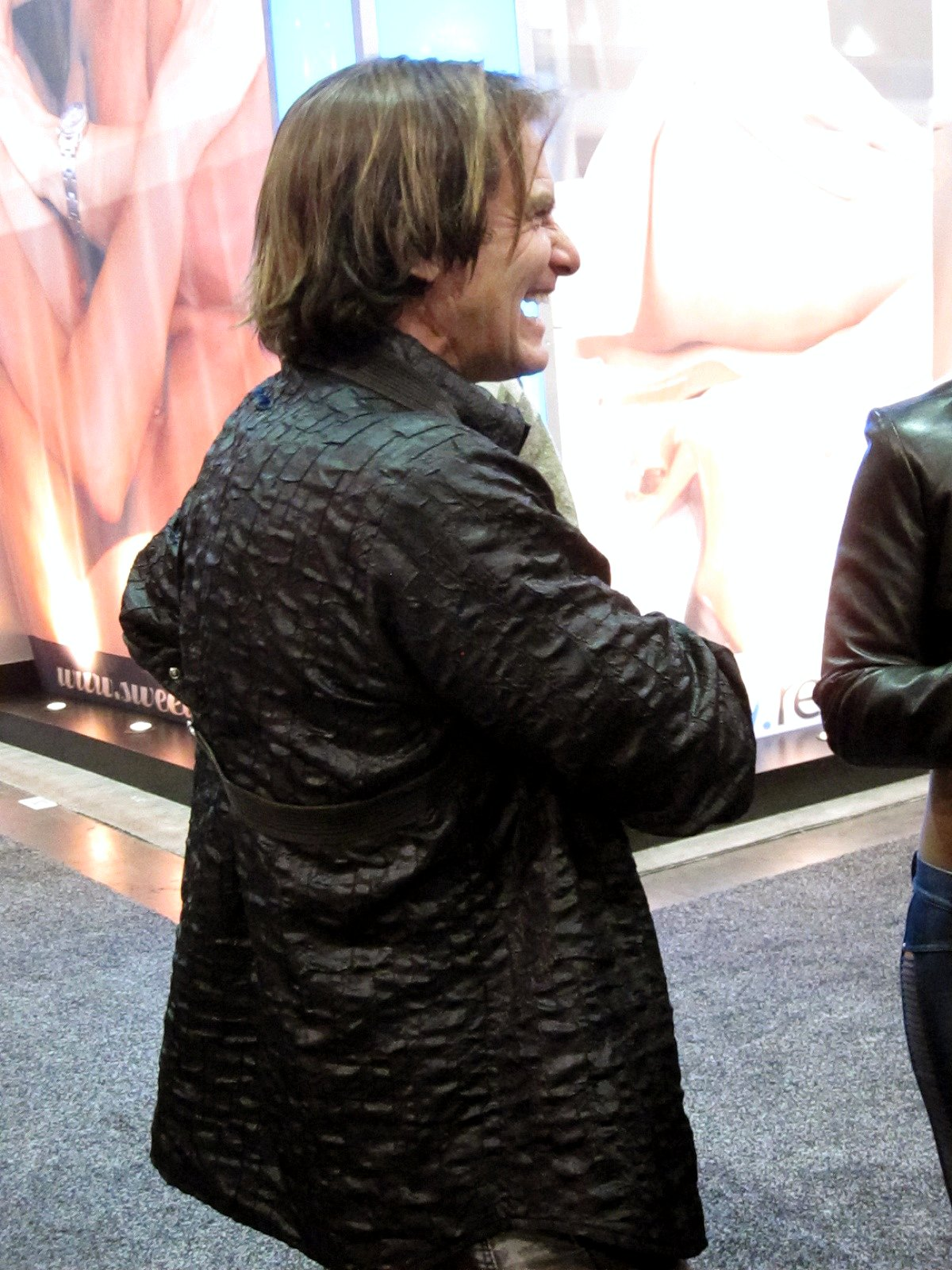
Evan Stone winner of Male Performer of the Year

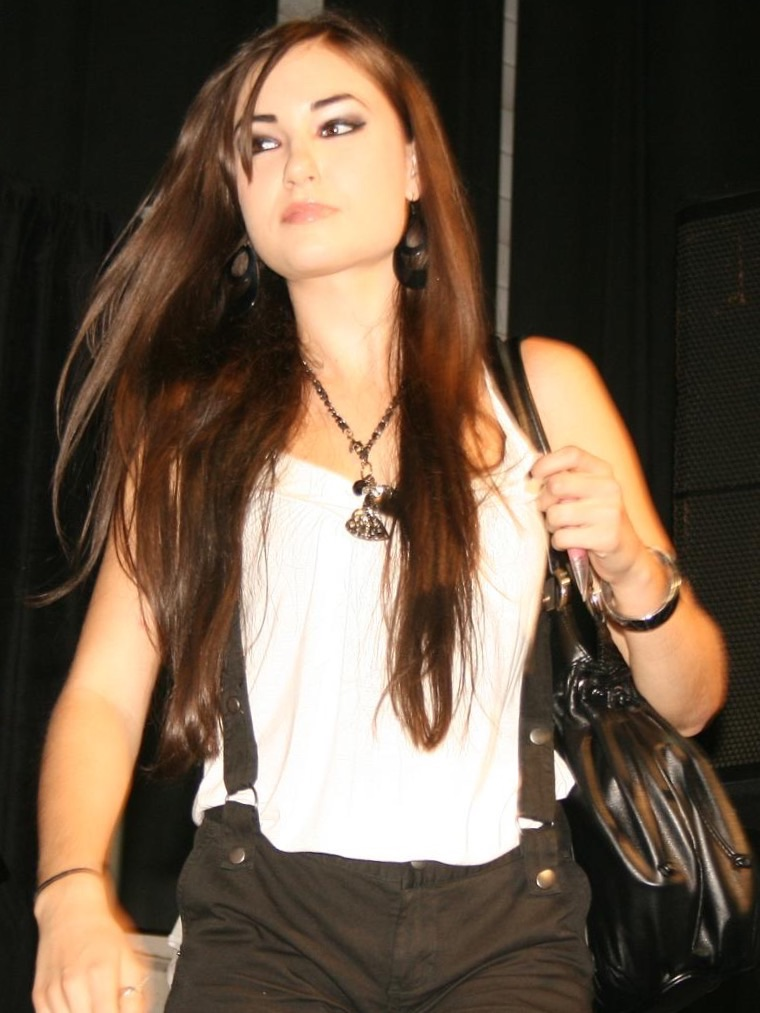
Sasha Grey winner of Performer of the Year

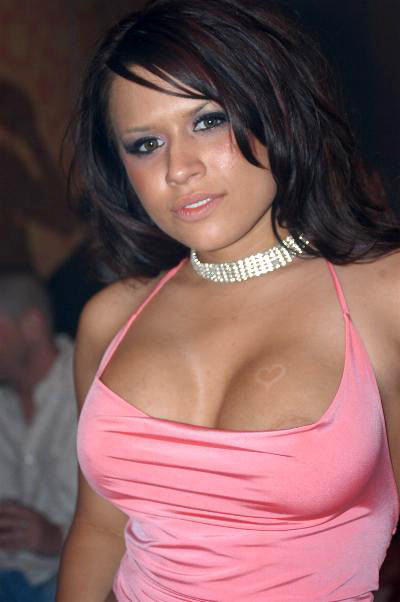
Eva Angelina won Best Actress Video for Upload

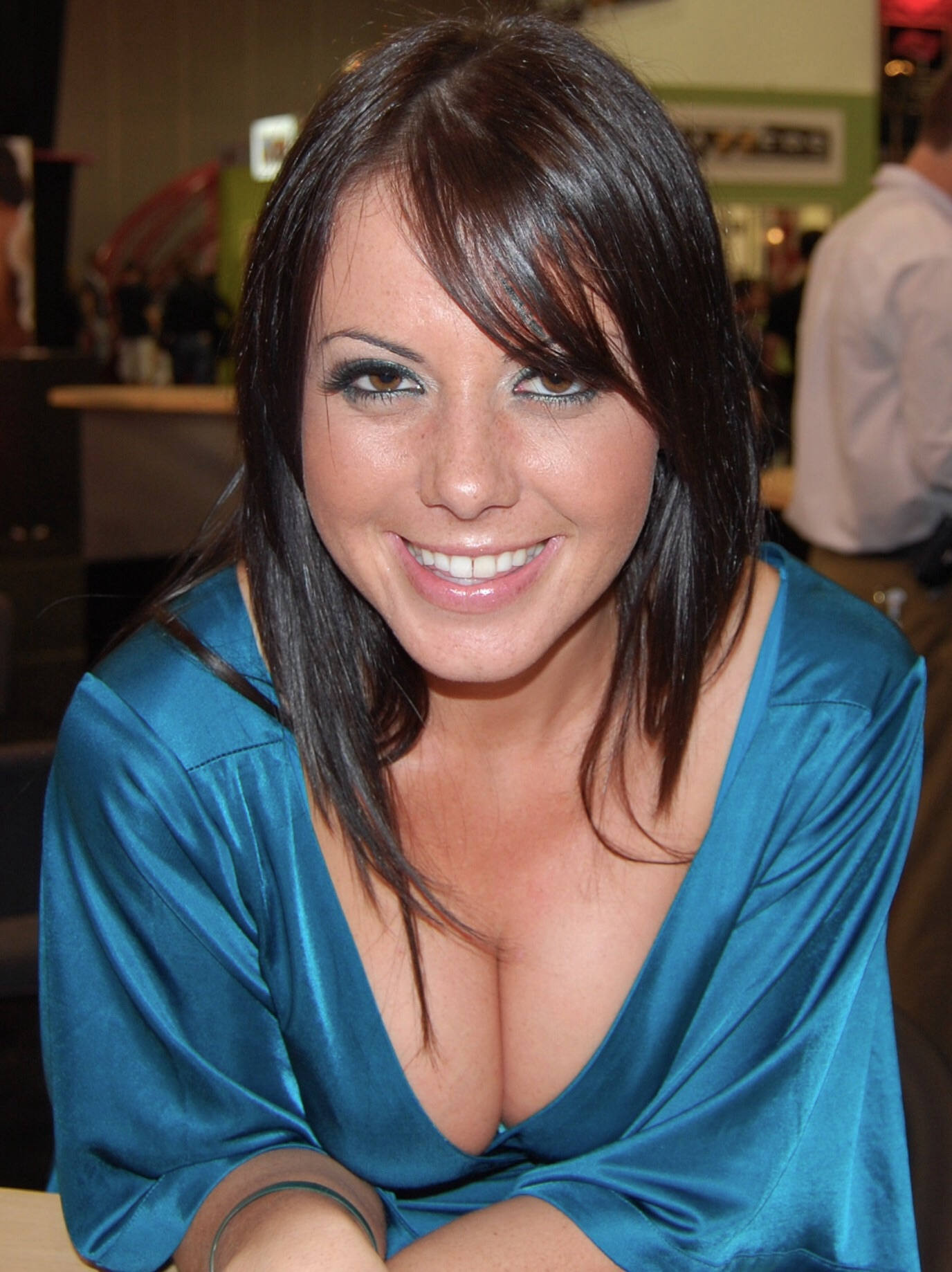
Penny Flame won Best Actress Film for Layout

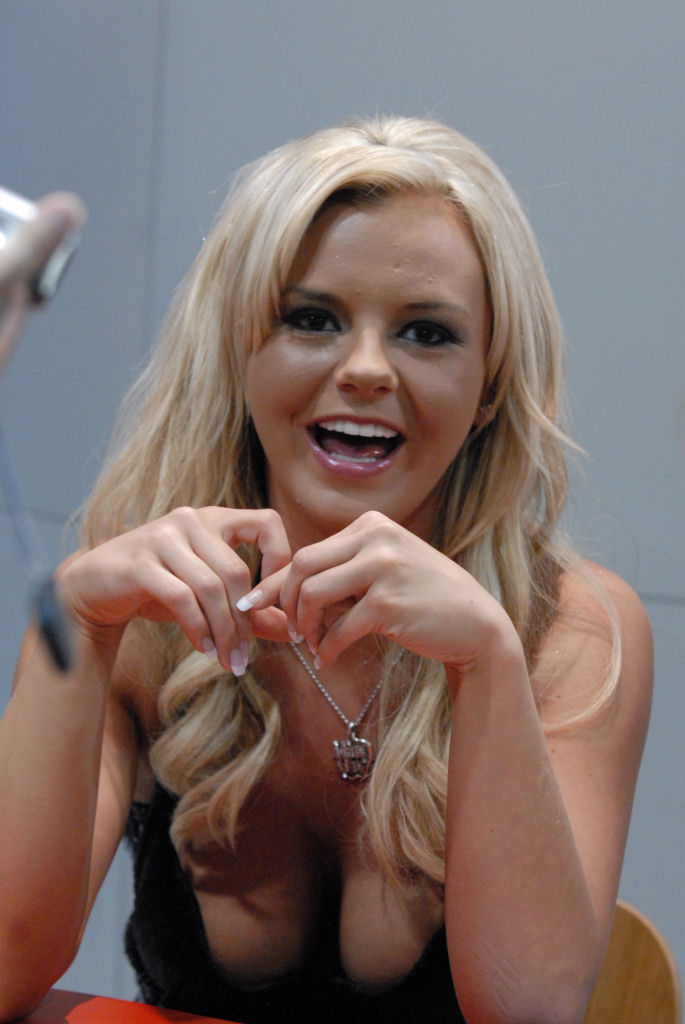
Bree Olson won for Best New Starlet

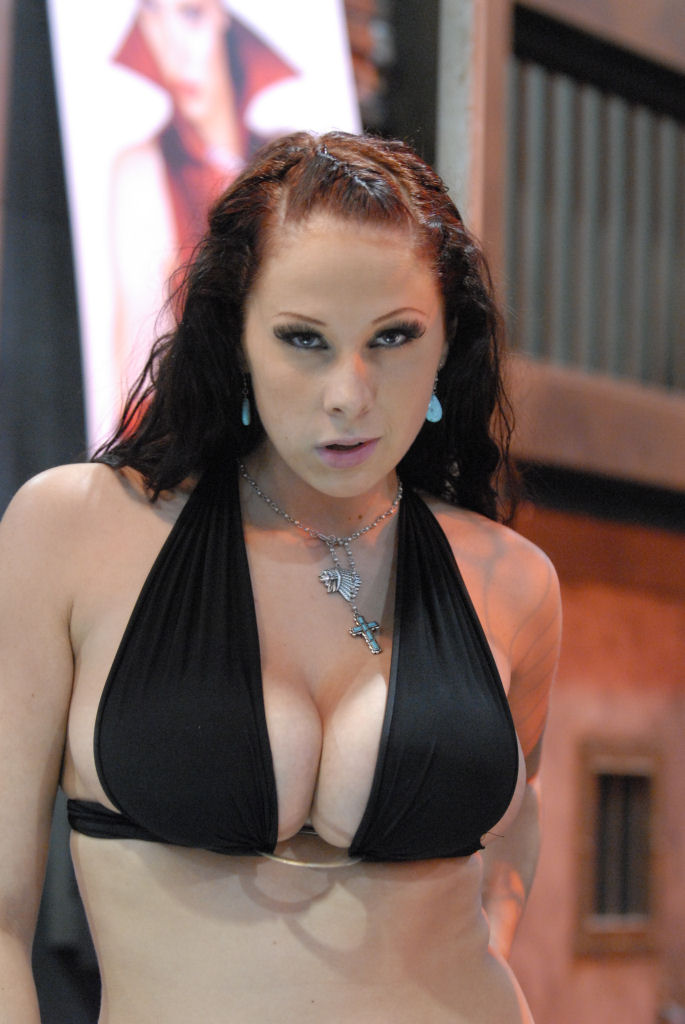
Gianna Michaels was the Unsung Starlet of the Year

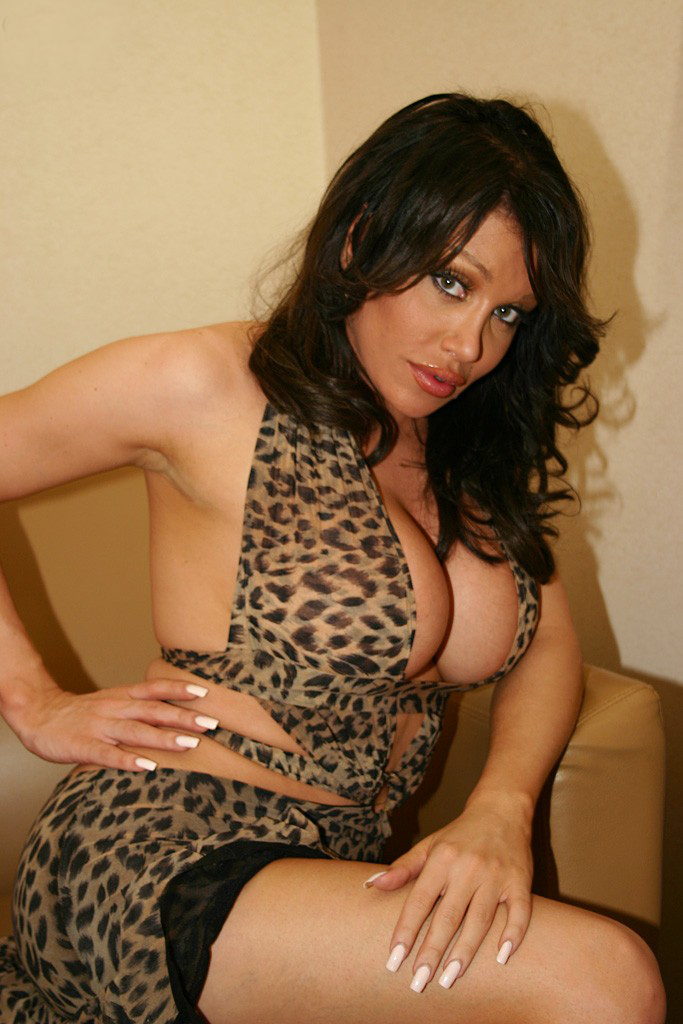
Allanah Starr, the Transsexual Performer of the Year

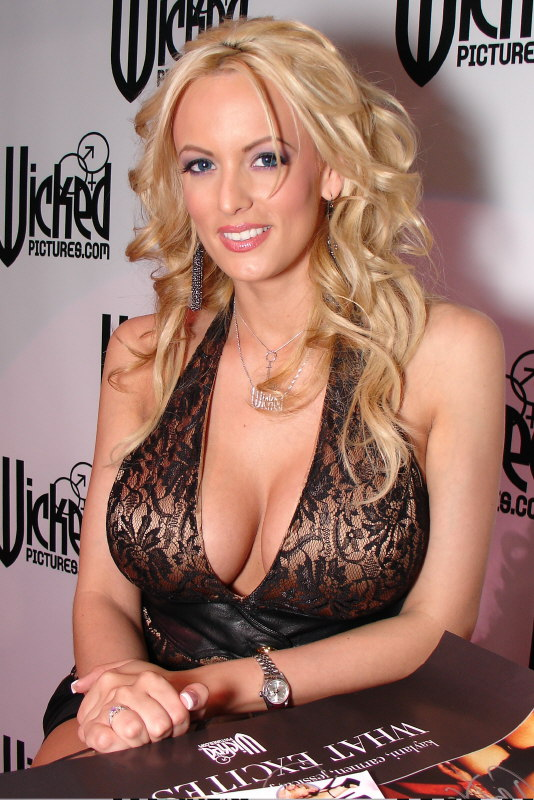
Stormy Daniels won The Jenna Jameson Crossover Star of the Year

Best Actor Film	Best Actress Film
**Tom Byron**, Layout (Vivid) Rod Fontana, Sex & Violins, Vivid Marcos Leon, Layout, Vivid Marty Romano, Flasher, Vivid Steven St. Croix, Sex & Violins, Vivid	**Penny Flame**, Layout (Vivid) Briana Banks, Layout, Vivid Roxy Jezel, Sex & Violins, Vivid Stefani Morgan, Debbie Does Dallas ... Again, Vivid Savanna Samson, Flasher, Vivid
Best Actor Video	Best Actress Video
**Brad Armstrong**, Coming Home (Wicked) Barrett Blade, Nowhere Angels (Cal Vista/Metro) Chris Cannon, Dolores of My Heart (Pulpo Inc.) Tony De Sergio, Black Worm (Pulpo Inc.) Mike Horner, Not the Bradys XXX (Hustler) Nick Manning, Spunk'd the Movie (6969 Entertainment) Derrick Pierce, Upload (SexZ Pictures) Tony Pounds, American Dream (Vivid) Herschel Savage, Delilah (Wicked) Rocco Siffredi, Fashionistas Safado: Berlin (Evil Angel) Justin Slayer, Merc (Evil Angel) Randy Spears, Black Widow (Wicked) Steven St. Croix, Operation: Desert Stormy (Wicked) Evan Stone, Pulp Friction (Adam & Eve) Voodoo, Insertz (Wicked)	**Eva Angelina**, Upload (SexZ Pictures) Stormy Daniels, Black Widow, Wicked Jessica Drake, Delilah, Wicked Carmen Hart, Just Between Us, Wicked Jenna Jameson, Janine Loves Jenna, Club Jenna Roxy Jezel, For Love, Money or a Green Card, Wicked Tory Lane, Outkast, Sin City Kaylani Lei, Candelabra, Wicked Brianna Love, Brianna Love: Her Fine Sexy Self, Evil Angel Carmen Luvana, Lady Scarface, Adam & Eve Kirsten Price, Coming Home, Wicked Savanna Samson, Stood Up, Vivid Lorena Sanchez, Black Worm, Pulpo Inc. Hillary Scott, Not the Brady's XXX, Hustler Simone Valentino, Afrodite Superstar, Adam & Eve
Best Male Newcomer	Best New Starlet
**Alan Stafford** Jordan Ash Mikey Butders Charles Dera Alex Gonz J-Mac Shorty Mac Justice Young	**Bree Olson** Audrey Bitoni Ashlynn Brooke Renae Cruz Maya Hills Paulina James Shay Jordan Alexis Love Natasha Nice Casey Parker Lorena Sanchez Lela Star Alexis Texas Veronique Vega Tera Wray
The Jenna Jameson Crossover Star of the Year	Unsung Starlet of the Year
**Stormy Daniels** Joanna Angel Mary Carey Summer Haze Jesse Jane Ron Jeremy Sunny Lane Gina Lynn Nick Manning Michelle Maylene Katie Morgan Tera Patrick Savanna Samson Evan Seinfeld Lexington Steele	**Gianna Michaels** Roxy DeVille Veronica Jett Katarina Kat Faith Leon Gianna Lynn Brooke Haven Lindsey Meadows Trina Michaels Mikayla Adrianna Nicole Amber Rayne Mia Rose Sammie Rhodes Bobbi Starr
Female Foreign Performer of the Year	Female Performer of the Year
**Monica Mattos** Baroka Balls Nikky Blond Caylian Curtis Suzie Diamond Diana Doll Clara G Isabel Ice Melissa Lauren Divinity Love Oksana Nikki Rider Liliane Tiger Tarra White Yasmine	**Sasha Grey** Monique Alexander Courtney Cummz Stormy Daniels Jada Fire Jenna Haze Jesse Jane Sunny Lane Rebeca Linares Brianna Love Kirsten Price Amy Ried Savanna Samson Annette Schwarz Hillary Scott
Male Performer of the Year	Transsexual Performer of the Year
**Evan Stone** Marco Banderas James Deen Shane Diesel Erik Everhard Manuel Ferrara Tommy Gunn Dirty Harry Jean Val Jean Charlie Macc Nick Manning Mr. Marcus Mr. Pete Randy Spears Mark Wood	**Alannah Starr** Buck Angel Khloe Hart Sexy Jade Kourtney Yasmin Lee Carla Novaes Thays Schiavinato Vaniity Vicki Richter Wendy Williams
Best Film	Director of the Year (Body of Work)
**Layout**, Vivid The Craving, Wicked Debbie Does Dallas ... Again, Vivid Fashion Underground, Vivid Flasher, Vivid Sex & Violins, Vivid X, Studio A	**Jules Jordan** Belladonna Cezar Capone Robby D. Stormy Daniels Jonni Darkko Rick Davis Alexander DeVoe Manuel Ferrara William H. Jake Malone Jim Powers Justin Slayer Paul Thomas Vince Vouyer

=== Other performing awards ===
- Best Supporting Actor - Film: Randy Spears
- Best Supporting Actor - Video: Barrett Blade
- Best Supporting Actress - Film: Kylie Ireland
- Best Supporting Actress - Video: Hillary Scott
- Male Foreign Performer of the Year: David Perry
- Best Tease Performance: Brianna Love, Brianna Love: Her Fine Sexy Self
- Best Non-Sex Performance: Bryn Pryor, Upload

== Best Scenes ==
Winners of categories announced during the awards ceremony on January 12, 2008, are highlighted in boldface.

=== Film ===
Best All-Girl Sex Scene	Best Anal Sex Scene
**Faith Leon, Monique Alexander & Stefani Morgan**, Sex & Violins (Vivid): Savanna Samson & Brooke Haven, Flasher (Vivid); Briana Banks & Penny Flame, Layout (Vivid); Penny Flame & Joey, Layout (Vivid); Cytherea & Melisande, X (Studio A)	**Chelsie Rae & Tyler Knight**, The Craving (Wicked): Staci Thorn & Marty Romano, Debbie Does Dallas ... Again (Vivid); Savanna Samson & Manuel Ferrara, Flasher (Vivid); Briana Banks & Kurt Lockwood, Layout (Vivid); Roxy Jezel & Trent Tesoro, Sex & Violins (Vivid)
Best Couples Sex Scene	Best Group Sex Scene
**Penny Flame & Tom Byron**, Layout (Vivid): Jessica Drake & Justin Magnum, The Craving (Wicked); Stefani Morgan & Derrick Pierce, Debbie Does Dallas ... Again (Vivid); Tera Patrick & Tommy Gunn, Fashion Underground (Teravision/Vivid); Roxy Jezel & Steven St. Croix, Sex & Violins (Vivid); Faith Leon & Anton, X (Studio A)	**Stefani Morgan, Savanna Samson, Monique Alexander,** **Evan Stone, Christian & Jay Huntington**, Debbie Does Dallas ... Again (Vivid): Penny Flame, Joey, Haley Scott & Tyce Bune, Layout (Vivid); Briana Banks, Hillary Scott, Evan Stone & Brooke Haven, Layout (Vivid); Stefani Morgan, Sandra Romain, Roxxy Rush & Jerry, Sex & Violins (Vivid); Jessica Drake, Kimberly Kole, Kayla Carrera, Brooke Haven & Randy Spears, The Craving (Wicked)
Best Oral Sex Scene	
**Kylie Ireland**, Layout (Vivid): Jessica Drake, The Craving (Wicked); Cara Lott, Flasher (Vivid); Dillan Lauren & Luccia, Flasher (Vivid)

=== Video ===
Best All-Girl Sex Scene	Best Anal Sex Scene
**Sophia Santi, Alektra Blue, Sammie Rhodes, Angie Savage & Lexxi Tyler**, Babysitters (Digital Playground): Belladonna & Naomi, Belladonna's Fucking Girls 4 (Evil Angel); Bree Olson & Sasha Grey, Boundaries (Triangle); Carmen Luvana & Courtney Cummz, Eden (Adam & Eve); Elexis & Leighlani, Elexis and Her Girlfriends (Girlfriends Films); Nikki Nine & Cayton Caley, The Erotic Adventures of Nikki Nine, Hustler Video; Kimberly Kane, Jolean & Akina, Erocktavison 6: Getcha Freak On, Dana Dane Productions/Pulse; Daisy Marie & Jenna Haze, Evilution 3, Manuel Ferrara/Evil Angel; Andie Valentino & Carli Banks, Fem Staccato, Ninn Worx_SR; Kimberly Kane & Charlotte Stokely, Girls Love Girls 2, Jonni Darkko/Evil Angel; Francesca Le & Stephanie Swift, Girlvana 3, Zero Tolerance Entertainment; Jenna Jameson, Janine & Justine Joli, Janine Loves Jenna, Club Jenna/Vivid; Gina Mond & Nadia, Sinema, Club Jenna/Vivid; Faith Leon & Selina Draagen, Through Her Eyes, Ninn Worx_SR; Orgy Scene, Where the Boys Aren't 18, Vivid Entertainment Group	**Bree Olson & Brandon Iron**, Big Wet Asses 10, Elegant Angel Productions: Veronica Jett & Tommy Pistol, Ave X, Black Mirror Productions/VCA Pictures; Hillary Scott & Sascha, Butthole Whores, Belladonna/Evil Angel; Kelly Wells & Justin Long, Cuckold, Chatsworth Pictures/JM Productions; Brian Pumper & Aurora Jolie, Cum in My Booty, B. Pumper Productions/West Coast Productions; Mia Rose & Manuel Ferrara, Evilution 2, Manuel Ferrara/Evil Angel; Brianna Love & Rico Strong, Filth Cums First, Handheld Pictures/Digital Playground; Tory Lane, Vanessa Lane & Mr. Pete, Flesh Hunter 9, Jules Jordan Video; Bobbi Starr & Brandon Iron, Fuck Slaves 2, Jake Malone/Evil Angel; Ashley Blue & Corey Banks, Girlvert 13, JM Productions; Maya Gates & Mark Wood, I've Been Sodomized 3, Red Light District; Courtney Cummz & Tommy Gunn, Jack’s Playground 34, Digital Playground; Nina Hartley & Marco Banderas, Nina Hartley’s Guide to Porn Star Sex Secrets, Adam & Eve Pictures; Sativa Rose & Jean Val Jean, Pretty Pussies Please 3, Third Degree Films; Trina Michaels & Anthony Hardwood, Sophia Revealed, Club Jenna/Vivid
Best Couples Sex Scene	Best Group Sex Scene
**Jenna Haze & Manuel Ferrara**, Evil Anal 2 (Evil Angel): Ashlynn Brooke & Mark Davis, Addicted Forever (New Sensations); Rebeca Linares & Mark Ashley, Angels of Debauchery 6 (Evil Angel); Aubrey Addams & Jules Jordan, Ass Worship 10 (Jules Jordan Video); Stormy Daniels & Randy Spears, Black Widow (Wicked); Brianna Love & Mr. Pete, Brianna Love Is Buttwoman (Elegant Angel); Melissa Lauren & Nacho Vidal, Fashionistas Safado: Berlin (Evil Angel); Gina Lynn & Jean Val Jean, Flesh Hunter 9 (Jules Jordan Video); Jenni Lee & Johnny Sins, Fuck Club (Pure Play); Jada Fire & Manuel Ferrara, Jada Fire Is Squirtwoman (Elegant Angel); Jenna Jameson & Justin Sterling, Janine Loves Jenna (Club Jenna); Belladonna & Tony T, Manhandled 2 (Evil Angel); Hillary Scott & James Deen, Upload (SexZ Pictures); Jayna Oso & Tommy Gunn, Zen (Wicked)	**Annette Schwartz, Sintia Stone, Judith Fox, Vanessa Hill & Rocco Siffredi**; Fashionistas Safado: Berlin, Evil Angel: Bree Olson, Amy Ried, Sascha & Marco Banderas DreamGirlz, Third Degree Films; Sarah Sun, Melissa Lauren, Steve Holmes, Joachim Kessef & Jazz Duro Fashionistas Safado: Berlin, Evil Angel; Sarah Jane, Lorelei, Brandon Iron & Jake Malone Fuck Slaves 2, Jake Malone/Evil Angel; Tory Lane, Annette Schwartz, Mr. Pete & John Strong The Good, the Bad, and the Slutty, Platinum X Productions; Jenna Jameson, Belladonna, Nikita Denise, Aurora Snow Cindy Crawford, Alaura Eden, Courtney & T.T. Boy I Dream of Jenna 2, Club Jenna/Vivid; Isabella Pacino, Shorty Mac, Rock, Byron Long, Devlin Weed, Lee Bang, Lefty, J Stroks, Justin Long & Jon Jon Little Red Rides the Hood 2, Black Market Entertainment; Jesse Jane, Rebeca Linares, Brianna Love & Marco Banderas Naked Aces 2, Digital Playground; Kelly Wells, Marco Banderas, John Strong & Brian Surewood Naomi’s Fuck Me, Harmony/Evil Angel; Jasse Monroe, Divine, Danae Denton, Jersey Cummings, Marc Anthony, Sean Michaels, Julia Bond, Lena Lang, Charlie Macc Jamie Elle, Aaralyn Barra, Nathan Threat, Daryn Darby, Cesar, Jon Jon, Lee Bang, Domineko & Sledge Hammer Orgy World 11, Evasive Angles Entertainment; Micah Moore, Riley Shy, Mike Adriano & Steve Holmes Rich Little Bitch, New Sensations; Gina Mond, Jean Val Jean, Johnny Castle, Nick Taylor & Jordan Ashley Sinema, Club Jenna/Vivid; Lexi Belle, Annette Schwartz, Bobbi Starr, Steve Holmes & Ian Scott Slutty & Sluttier 3, Manuel Ferrara/Evil Angel; Sasha Grey, Jenna Presley, Sierra Sinn & Mark Ashley Swallow My Squirt 4, Elegant Angel Productions; Eva Angelina, Julie Night, Veronica Rayne, Marsha Lord, Shannon Kelly Carly Parker, Kayden Faye, Faye Runaway, Aiden Starr, Mark Davis Alex Sanders, Tyler Knight, Sledge Hammer, Christian, Alex Gonz, Justice Young & Evan Stone Upload, SexZ Pictures
Best Oral Sex Scene	Most Outrageous Sex Scene
**Sasha Grey**, Babysitters (Digital Playground): Rebeca Linares, Barely Legal 69 (Hustler); Cindy Crawford, Black Snake Boned (JM Productions); Francesca Felluci & Rachel Evans, Blow Banged (Doghouse Digital); Maya Hills & Sasha Grey, Blow Me Sandwich 11 (Zero Tolerance); Brianna Love, Brianna Love Is Buttwoman (Elegant Angel); Belladonna, Fashionistas Safado: Berlin (Evil Angel); Sasha Grey, Feeding Frenzy 9 (Jules Jordan Video); Riley Shy, Gag Factor 24 (JM Productions); Veronica Stone, Gangbang My Face 2 (Evil Angel); Belladonna, I Dream of Jenna 2 (Club Jenna); Brianna Love, I Wanna Get Face Fucked 4 (Anabolic Video); Clare Dames, Sperm Splattered 4 (Platinum X); Roxy DeVille, Swallow My Children (Loaded Digital/Metro); Missy Monroe, X-Rated (FusXion/Metro)	**Cindy Crawford, Rick Masters & Audrey Hollander** Ass Blasting Felching Anal Whores (JM Productions); Kissy Kapri & The Bukkake Boys, American Gokkun 3 (JM Productions); Nikki Nievez, Anal Solo Masturbation (Robert Hill Releasing); Belladonna & Claire Adams, Belladonna Fetish Fanatic 5 (Evil Angel); Sierra Sinn, Veronica Jett & Brian Surewood, Blow It Out Your Ass 2, (Elegant Angel); Paris Gables, Cassandra Cruz, Kyle Stone, Scott Lyons, Rick Masters, John West, Dakota Frank Towers, Dominic & Matt Zane, Club Satan: The Witches Sabbath (Extreme Associates); Kalla Monroe, Initiations 19 (Anabolic Video); Katja Kassin & Alec Metro, Power Bitches 2 (Powersville/JM); Mistress Nicolette & Wendy Williams, Shemale Fetish Extreme, (American Xcess); Chelsea Rae, Sperm Receptacles 2 (Jules Jordan Video); Sierra Sinn, Georgia Southe & Mark Ashley, Supersquirt 4 (Elegant Angel); Tera Wray & Mark Zane, Tattooed & Tight (Matt Zane Productions); Julie Night, Adrianna Nicole & Alex Sanders, Upload (SexZ Pictures); Elizabeth Rollings, World's Biggest Fattest Cream Pie Gangbang White Ghetto/Devil's Film; Joanna Angel, Kylee Kross & Tommy Pistol, The XXXorcist (Burning Angel Entertainment)

- Best Three-way Sex Scene: Rocco Siffredi, Katsuni, Melissa Lauren, Fashionistas Safado: Berlin (Evil Angel)
- Best POV Sex Scene: Sunny Lane, Goo Girls 26 (Rodnievision/Exquisite)
- Best Sex Scene in a Foreign-Shot Production: Marsha Lord, Poppy Morgan, Joachim Kessef, Vanessa Hill, Sarah James, Kid Jamaica, Jazz Duro, Omar Galanti, Gianna, Kelly Stafford, Furious Fuckers: Final Race (Evil Angel)
- Best Solo Sex Scene: Eva Angelina, Upload (SexZ Pictures)

== Best releases ==
The best releases of the year, selected by genre. The winners are shown in italics, followed by the production company.

- Video Feature: Upload (SexZ Pictures)
- All-Girl Release: Girlvana 3 (Zero Tolerance)
- All-Girl Series: Women Seeking Women (Girlfriends Films)
- All-Sex Release: G for Gianna (Evil Angel/Darkko Productions)
- Alternative Release: Buttman at Nudes a Poppin' 20 (Evil Angel
- Amateur Release: Cherries 56 (Homegrown Video/Pure Play Media)
- Amateur Series: Intimate Moments (abbywinters.com)
- Anal-Themed Series: Big Wet Asses (Elegant Angel)
- Animated Release: Night Shift Nurses (Adult Source Media)
- BDSM Release: Bondage Thoughts (Daring Media Group)
- Big Bust Release: Gina Lynn's DD's and Derrieres 2 (Gina Lynn Distribution)
- Big Bust Series: Big Natural Breasts (New Sensations)
- Continuing Video Series: Belladonna: Manhandled (Evil Angel/Belladonna)
- Ethnic-Themed Release - Asian: Anabolic Asians 5 (Anabolic Video)
- Ethnic-Themed Release - Black: Big Phat Black Wet Butts 7 (Evasive Angles)
- Ethnic-Themed Release - Latin: Big Latin Wet Butts 5 (Evasive Angles)
- Ethnic-Themed Series - Asian: Asian 1 on 1 (Naughty America/Pure Play Media)
- Ethnic-Themed Series - Black: Black Reign (Mercenary Pictures)
- Ethnic-Themed Series - Latin: Chicks & Salsa (Third Degree)
- Fem-Dom Strap-On Release: Babes Ballin' Boys 17 (Pleasure Productions)
- Foot Fetish Release: Stiletto (Pulse/Penthouse)
- Foreign All-Sex Release: Angel Perverse 8 (Evil Angel/Euro Angel)
- Foreign All-Sex Series: Ass Jazz (Evil Angel/Buttman Magazine Choice)
- Foreign Feature: Furious Fuckers: Final Race (Evil Angel/Rocco Siffredi)
- Gonzo Release: Brianna Love Is Buttwoman (Elegant Angel)
- Gonzo Series: Bang Bus (Bang Bros)
- High End All-Sex Release: Broken (Vivid)
- Internal Release: All Internal 5 (Jules Jordan/Cruel Media)
- Internal Series: 5 Guy Cream Pie (Kick Ass Pictures)
- Interracial Release: Black Owned 2 (Jules Jordan Video)
- Interracial Series: My Daughter's Fucking Blackzilla! (Hush Hush)
- MILF Release: It’s a Mommy Thing (Elegant Angel)
- MILF Series: Momma Knows Best (Red Light District)
- POV Release: Fucked on Sight 2 (Evil Angel/Manuel Ferrara)
- POV Series: Fucked on Sight (Evil Angel/Manuel Ferrara)
- Pro-Am Release: Breakin' 'Em In 11 (Vouyer Media)
- Pro-Am Series: Filthy's First Taste (Vivid/Club Jenna)
- Oral-Themed Release: Face Full of Diesel (Digital Sin)
- Oral-Themed Series: Feeding Frenzy (Jules Jordan Video)
- Sex Comedy: Operation Desert Stormy (Wicked)
- Vignette Release: Babysitters (Digital Playground)
- Vignette Series: Barely Legal School Girls (Hustler)
- Transsexual Release: Transsexual Babysitters 2 (Devil's Film)
- Transsexual Series: Transsexual Prostitutes (Devil's Film)
- Spanking Release: Baltimore Brat 2 (Kelly Payne Productions)
- Specialty Release, Other Genre: Cum On My Tattoo 3 (BurningAngel/Pulse)
- Specialty Series, Other Genre: Jack's Leg Show (Digital Playground)
- Squirting Release: Flower's Squirt Shower 4 (Elegant Angel)
- Squirting Series: Jada Fire Is Squirtwoman (Elegant Angel)
- Solo Release: Extreme Holly Goes Solo (Pink Visual Productions)
- Top Renting Title of the Year – 2007: Debbie Does Dallas ... Again, (Vivid)
- Top Selling Title of the Year – 2007: Pirates, (Adam & Eve/Digital Playground)

== Honorary awards ==
=== Hall of Fame ===
- Brittany Andrews
- Jay Ashley
- Skye Blue
- Jake Jacobs
- Angel Kelly
- Dyanna Lauren
- Michael Raven
- Raylene
- Ruby
- Alexandra Silk
- Angela Summers
- Tasha Voux

=== Hall of Fame - Founders Branch ===
- Martin Rothstein, Model Distributors
- Teddy Rothstein, Star Distributors
- Kenneth Guarino, Metro Home Video

=== Reuben Sturman Awards ===
- Jeff Steward, JM Productions - Who battled Federal obscenity prosecution head-on and won.
- Rondee Kamins, General Video of America - For her appeals court victory striking down 2257 regulations as unconstitutional. Kamins warned that “freedom isn’t free” and that all 50 states have some kind of onerous restrictions on adult entertainment.

== Technical awards ==
The winners are shown in italics, followed by the production company.

- Best Art Direction - Film: The Craving (Wicked)
- Best Art Direction - Video: Fashionistas Safado: Berlin (Evil Angel)
- Best Cinematography: Fashion Underground (Vivid/Teravision)
- Best Classic DVD: Debbie Does Dallas (VCX)
- Best Director - Film: Paul Thomas, Layout (Vivid)
- Best Director - Foreign Release: Alessandro Del Mar, Dangerous Sex (Private USA/Pure Play Media)
- Best Director - Non-Feature: Belladonna, Belladonna: Manhandled 2 (Belladonna/Evil Angel)
- Best Director - Video: John Stagliano, Fashionistas Safado: Berlin (Evil Angel)
- Best DVD Extras: Upload (SexZ Pictures)
- Best DVD Menus: Not the Bradys XXX (Hustler/X-Play)
- Best Editing - Film: Andrew Blake, X (Studio A)
- Best Editing - Video: John Stagliano, Fashionistas Safado: Berlin (Evil Angel)
- Best High-Definition Production: Fashionistas Safado: Berlin (Evil Angel)
- Best Interactive DVD: (tie) InTERActive (Teravision/Hustler) & Interactive Sex with Jenna Haze (Zero Tolerance)
- Best Music: Afrodite Superstar (Femme Chocolat/Adam & Eve)
- Best New Video Production Company: Silver Sinema
- Best On-Line Marketing Campaign, Company Image: Club Jenna
- Best On-Line Marketing Campaign, Individual Project: Debbie Does Dallas ... Again (Vivid)
- Best Overall Marketing Campaign, Company Image: Vivid Entertainment
- Best Overall Marketing Campaign, Individual Project: Coming Home (Wicked)
- Best Packaging: Janine Loves Jenna [Double Disc] (Club Jenna)
- Best Packaging Innovation: The Exquisite Multimedia Lighted Boxes (Exquisite Multimedia)
- Best Retail Website, Rentals: SugarDVD
- Best Retail Website, Sales: AdultDVDEmpire.com
- Best Screenplay, Film: Layout, Phil Noir (Vivid)
- Best Screenplay, Video: Upload, Eli Cross (SexZ Pictures)
- Best Special Effects: Upload (SexZ Pictures)
- Best Videography: Black Worm (Pulpo)

== See also ==
- Adult Video News Awards
- AVN Award for Male Performer of the Year
- AVN Female Performer of the Year Award
- List of members of the AVN Hall of Fame
- AVN Award for Male Foreign Performer of the Year
- XBIZ Awards
- XRCO Awards
