= Derrick Pierce =

American pornographic actor and director (born 1974)

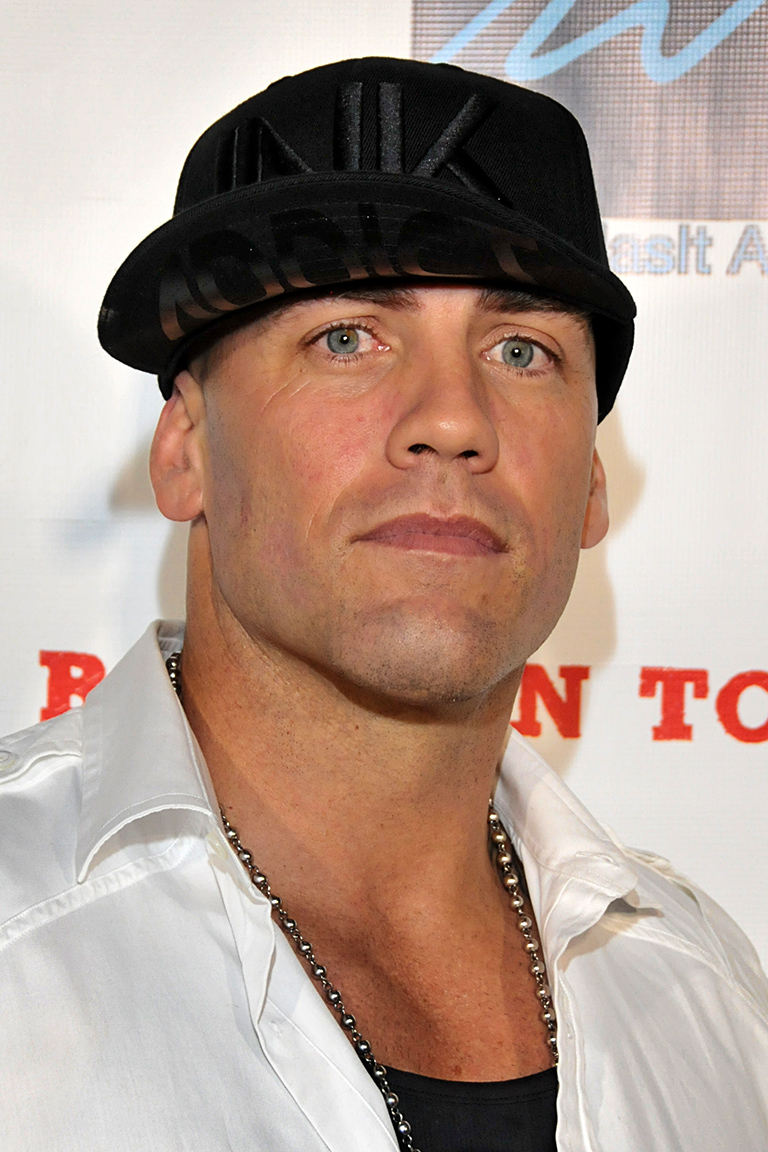
- Pierce in Hollywood, California on December 5, 2014
- Born: March 1, 1973 (age 53); Springfield, Massachusetts, U.S.
- Height: 6 ft 0 in (1.83 m)

Derrick Pierce (born March 1, 1973) is an American pornographic actor, director, radio personality, and personal trainer. Pierce has received several adult industry awards, including the 2009 NightMoves Award for Best Male Performer and the 2016 XRCO Award for Best Actor.

== Early life ==
Pierce was born in Springfield, Massachusetts and raised in Los Angeles, California. He is of French and Italian descent. He was raised by a single mother whom he credits as a strong influence in his life. His mother was also in the entertainment world, as were her girlfriends.

As a child, he moved to Southern California with his mother and grew up in the Sylmar area of the San Fernando Valley.

Pierce began his career in pornographic adult films in approximately 2005. Previously, he was a certified personal trainer and martial arts instructor for sixteen years before working in porn.

== Career in adult films ==
Pierce's first scene was with Vanessa Lane in Gothsend 4. He chose the last name "Pierce" for his stage name because he had nipple and tongue piercings at the time. The first name "Derrick" was suggested by an ex-girlfriend of his.

== Work in other media ==
In May 2008, Derrick Pierce became the co-host, with Kylie Ireland, of Playboy's Sirius Radio show, "The Friday Night Threeway".

== Awards and nominations ==
List of accolades received by Derrick Pierce
Awards & nominations
Award	Won	Nominated
AVN Awards	1	20
NightMoves Awards	1	0
XBIZ Awards	2	16
XRCO Awards	2	1
- Total number of wins and nominations
Totals	6	37
- References

AVN Awards
Year	Result	Award	Film
2007	Nominated	Best Male Newcomer	—N/a
2007	Nominated	Best Group Sex Scene – Video (with Kylie Ireland, Sandra Romain, Ariana Jollee, Lexi Bardot, Annie Cruz, Vixen, Jordan Styles, Tyler Knight, Rick Masters, Jerry & Seth Dickens)	Corruption
2008	Nominated	Best Actor, Video	Upload
2008	Nominated	Best Couples Sex Scene, Film (with Stefani Morgan)	Debbie Does Dallas ... Again
2008	Nominated	Best Supporting Actor, Video	Brianna Love: Her Fine Sexy Self
2008	Nominated	Best Threeway Sex Scene (with Sunny Lane & Lacie Heart)	Big Bad Blondes
2008	Nominated	Best Threeway Sex Scene (with Kylie Ireland & Delilah Strong)	Upload
2010	Won	Unsung Male Performer of the Year	—N/a
2011	Nominated	Best Group Sex Scene (with Bobbi Starr, Dani Jensen, Madelyn Marie, Krissy Lynn, Carolyn Reese, Paul Chaplin, Chris Johnson & Danny Wylde)	BatfXXX: Dark Night Parody
2012	Nominated	Best Boy/Girl Sex Scene (with Lily LaBeau)	Pervert
2013	Nominated	Best Group Sex Scene (with Gia DiMarco, Rihanna Rimes & Danny Wylde)	Star Wars XXX: A Porn Parody
2013	Nominated	Best Three-Way Sex Scene (G/G/B) (with Aiden Ashley & Andy San Dimas)	The Dark Knight XXX: A Porn Parody
2014	Nominated	Best Safe Sex Scene (with Jessica Drake)	$ex
2014	Nominated	Best Supporting Actor	Underworld
2014	Nominated	Best Three-Way Sex Scene – B/B/G (with Allie Haze & Xander Corvus)	Wolverine XXX: An Axel Braun Parody
2015	Nominated	Best Supporting Actor	Apocalypse X
2015	Nominated	Best Three-Way Sex Scene – G/G/B (with Lola Foxx & Mischa Brooks)	Apocalypse X
2016	Nominated	Best Actor	Magic Mike XXXL: A Hardcore Parody
2016	Nominated	Best Boy/Girl Sex Scene (with Carter Cruise)	Batman v Superman XXX: An Axel Braun Parody
2016	Nominated	Best Group Sex Scene (with Eva Lovia, Maddy O'Reilly & Keiran Lee)	Flesh
2017	Nominated	Male Performer of the Year	—N/a

NightMoves Awards
Year	Result	Award
2009	Won	Best Male Performer (Fans Choice)

XBIZ Awards
Year	Result	Award	Film
2011	Nominated	Male Performer of the Year	—N/a
2012	Nominated	Male Performer of the Year	—N/a
2013	Nominated	Male Performer of the Year	—N/a
2013	Nominated	Best Scene – Couples-Themed Release (with Gracie Glam)	Breaking All Ties
2014	Won	Best Actor – Couples-Themed Release	Tuff Love
2014	Nominated	Director of the Year – Feature Release	Tuff Love
2014	Nominated	Male Performer of the Year	—N/a
2014	Nominated	Best Supporting Actor	Underworld
2014	Nominated	Best Scene – Feature Movie (with Jessica Drake)	Underworld
2015	Nominated	Male Performer of the Year	—N/a
2015	Nominated	Best Actor – Feature Movie	Apocalypse X
2015	Nominated	Best Supporting Actor	Wetwork
2016	Nominated	Male Performer of the Year	—N/a
2016	Nominated	Best Actor – Parody Release	Magic Mike XXX: A Hardcore Parody
2016	Nominated	Best Supporting Actor	Batman vs. Superman XXX: An Axel Braun Parody
2016	Nominated	Best Sex Scene – Parody Release (with Jessica Drake)	Magic Mike XXXL
2016	Nominated	Best Sex Scene – All-Sex Release (with Siri & Tommy Pistol)	Sirious
2019	Won	Best Sex Scene – Vignette Release (with Tori Black & Adriana Chechik)	After Dark

XRCO Awards
Year	Result	Award	Film
2007	Won	New Stud	—N/a
2008	Nominated	Single Performance – Actor	Upload
2016	Won	Best Actor	Magic Mike XXXL: A Hardcore Parody
