= Deeper Throat =

Television series

Deeper Throat is a Showtime reality TV show in which Vivid Entertainment owner Steven Hirsch stages a full-court press to persuade the owner of the porn classic Deep Throat to sell him the remake rights.
