= Lizz Tayler =

American pornographic film actress (born 1989/1990)

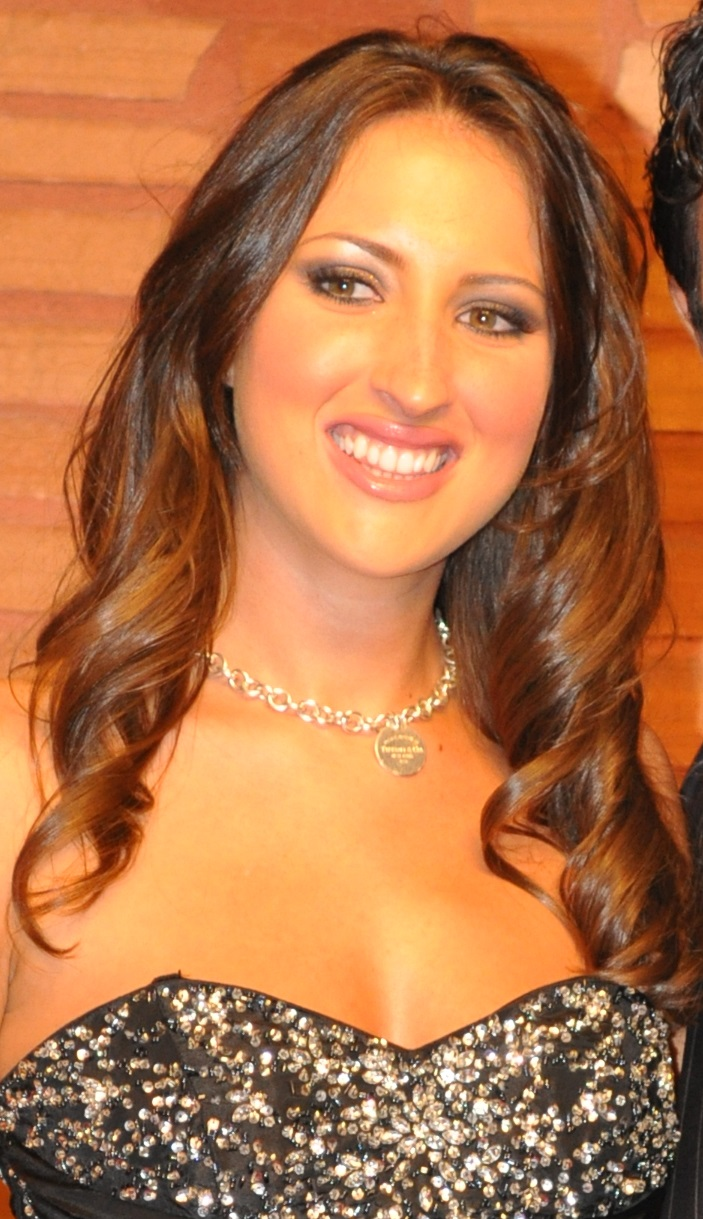
- Tayler in 2011
- Born: 1989 or 1990 (age 35–36)

Lizz Tayler (born 1989 or 1990) is an American pornographic film actress.

== Early life and career ==
A native of Phoenix, Arizona, Tayler debuted in the adult industry in March 2010. Her stage name comes from Elizabeth Taylor, who Tayler finds "very classy, yet...promiscuous at the same time". Tayler played softball for 14 years and ran cross country when she was younger, and she currently likes hiking & swimming.

A fan of pornographic film actress Briana Banks, Tayler has Banks' signature tattooed on her own abdomen.

In October 2010, the company Bottles-Up Inc. launched a signature cocktail named after her. Tayler has appeared in a music video with rap artist JMC and in the music video of the song "2 Cups" by Lil Debbie. She also was a guest in The Friday Night 3-Way, In Bed With Jessica Drake, and The Morning Show With Andrea and Kevin on Playboy Radio.

In 2011, Tayler was a "Heart-On Girl" at the XRCO Awards Show, where she was nominated as Best New Starlet.

== Awards and nominations ==
- 2011 XBIZ Award nominee – New Starlet of the Year
- 2011 XRCO Award nominee – New Starlet
- 2012 AVN Award nominee – Best New Starlet
- 2012 AVN Award nominee – Best Three-Way Sex Scene, G/B/B (Anarchy - Wicked Pictures) with Danny Wylde & Sascha
- 2013 AVN Award nominee – Best POV Sex Scene (Barely Legal POV 11 - Hustler Video) with Eric John
