= Danny Wylde =

American pornographic actor

- Born: Christopher Daniel Zeischegg; October 21, 1985 (age 40); Los Angeles County, California, U.S.
- Other names: Daniel, Danny Wilde
- Height: 5 ft 11 in (1.80 m)
- Spouse: Maggie West
- Website: trvewestcoastfiction.blogspot.com

Christopher Daniel Zeischegg (born October 21, 1985), formerly known as Danny Wylde, is an American writer, musician, filmmaker, and former pornographic actor.

== Early life ==
Wylde was born on October 21, 1985, in Alameda County, California. As a teenager, he attended hardcore punk shows and shortly afterward became straight edge. Wylde completed six years of undergraduate study.

== Pornographic career and advocacy ==
Wylde "had done my first porn scene when I was 19." He has appeared in straight, gay and bisexual pornographic films.

Wylde contributed the essay "Our Pornography" to The Feminist Porn Book: The Politics of Producing Pleasure, a collection of essays written by feminist porn scholars and feminists in the adult film industry. Wylde and his girlfriend, fellow porn star Lily Labeau, contributed a film of themselves having sex to the website MakeLoveNotPorn, which aims to "provide more realistic information about human sexuality than that provided by hardcore pornography". The couple later appeared on The Jeff Probst Show with MakeLoveNotPorn founder Cindy Gallop to discuss the site.

More recently, Wylde has been active in opposing Measure B, which requires all porn stars to wear condoms during vaginal and anal sex scenes filmed in Los Angeles County. In April 2013, he appeared alongside fellow pornographic actor Steven St. Croix to debate the measure on a HuffPost Live discussion panel.

== Non-pornographic career ==
=== Film ===
In addition to his adult film career, Wylde also produces and directs non-pornographic films. Some of these include Frisk, Nuclear, and Death and Sportsbras, all of which starred Guy Perry. Nuclear and another of his films, The Extraordinary Monday of Herman Brumby, have been screened at festivals.

=== Music ===
Wylde previously played in tech-metal bands Heuristic and Datura before becoming one half of the synthetic metal band Chiildren, his current project, alongside fellow porn star Chad Fjerstad (also known as Vin Vericose in the adult industry). The band is signed with Bit Riot Records, and has released one EP entitled The Other People. On the influence of pornography on their music, Fjerstad stated:

Sex and our lifestyle play a huge role in the lyrics, and I’m sure subconsciously in the mood of the music as well. The whole concept of [our debut album] ‘The Other People’ is about the separation we feel from everyone who is a non-sex-industry worker. When we go out, we observe the actions and behaviors of the majority of people, and it makes us feel very alien. ‘Milos’ is inspired by the extremely controversial ‘A Serbian Film,’ which is about an ex-pornstar thrown into a nightmarish snuff-world. We both found quite a bit of influence in that film. All of our stuff is littered with sex and violence — we can’t really escape it. At least not at this point in our lives.

Chiildren has released two music videos to date, for their tracks "My Gods" and "Girl in the Dirt".

=== Writing ===
Wylde has published three full-length novels, Come to My Brother (2013), The Wolves That Live in Skin and Space (2015), and The Magician (2020). He also released a collection of writings, Body to Job, in 2018.

== Personal life ==
Zeischegg is married to Maggie West, a photographer and artist.

== Awards and nominations ==
=== AVN Awards ===
Year	Result	Award	Film	Co-winners/co-nominees
2011	Nominated	Best Group Sex Scene, Video	BatfXXX: Dark Night	Bobbi Starr, Dani Jensen, Madelyn Marie, Krissy Lynn, Carolyn Reese, Paul Chaplin, Derrick Pierce, Chris Johnson
2011	Nominated	Unsung Male Performer of the Year	—N/a	—N/a
2012	Won	Best Group Sex Scene, Video	Tristan Taormino’s Rough Sex 3: Adrianna’s Dangerous Mind	Adrianna Nicole, Nat Turnher, Keni Styles, Evan Stone
2012	Nominated	Best Three-Way Sex Scene, Video	Anarchy	Lizz Tayler, Sascha
2012	Nominated	Best Three-Way Sex Scene, Video	Rough Sex 3: Adrianna’s Dangerous Mind	Adrianna Nicole, Keni Styles
2013	Nominated	Best Group Sex Scene, Video	Chanel Preston: No Limits	Chanel Preston, Alex Gonz, Billy Glide, Marco Banderas, Will Powers
2013	Nominated	Best Group Sex Scene, Video	Star Wars XXX: A Porn Parody	Gia DiMarco, Rihanna Rimes, Derrick Pierce
