= Sunrise Adams =

American former pornographic film actress

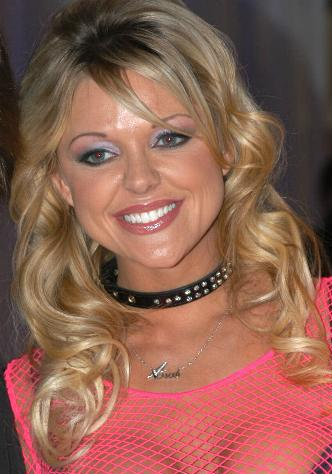
- Adams in 2007
- Born: St. Louis, Missouri, U.S.
- Citizenship: United States
- Occupations: Pornographic film actress; author
- Relatives: Sunset Thomas (aunt)
- Writing career
- Language: English
- Genre: Erotica
- Notable awards: 2003 Best New Starlet – Venus Award; 2004 Best Oral Sex Scene, Film – AVN Award

Sunrise Adams is an American author and pornographic film actress.

== Early life ==
Sunrise Adams was born in St. Louis, Missouri and raised in Pickton, Texas. In high school, she is noted for being the first female football player of her high school.

== Career ==
In 2002, Adams shot the episode "House Sitting" for the softcore series The Best Sex Ever on Cinemax. After years of mainstream modeling, including for Pony International, Adams signed with Vivid Entertainment. One of her favorite directors to work with became Chi Chi LaRue.

Her first movie with Vivid was Portrait of Sunrise. She was nominated for an AVN Award for Best Actress in 2003, losing to Jenna Haze. In June 2003, she appeared with Steve Hirsch on Your World with Neil Cavuto.

In 2004, she won the award for Best Oral Sex Scene – Film, alongside Randy Spears, for Heart of Darkness. On August 2, 2004, she appeared with Savanna Samson on Fox News's The O'Reilly Factor, to promote their book How to Have a XXX Sex Life. Weeks later, Adams and Samson were named in a lawsuit by Fox News producer Andrea Mackris that The O'Reilly Factor host Bill O'Reilly "launched into a vile and degrading monologue about sex" on the phone to Mackris immediately after the two porn stars appeared on the air. In October 2004, she appeared in an episode of the Australian television comedy series Pizza: Special Deliveries. Adams appeared as a wrestler in the 2004 fighting video game Backyard Wrestling 2: There Goes the Neighborhood. In 2005, Adams ended her contract with Vivid Entertainment to pursue a relationship with someone whom she described as wanting her to "be normal." She moved back to Texas and worked as a loan officer and in real estate.

Adams returned to the porn industry and signed a contract with Vivid Entertainment in 2006. She stated that she "was going to come back and do just a little bit of boy/girl, and mainly girl/girl", but ultimately decided to "do it all". That same year, she launched her first website, which has since been taken down.

== Personal life ==
Adams is the niece of porn star Sunset Thomas.

== Awards ==
- 2003 Venus Award - Best New Starlet (USA)
- 2004 AVN Award - Best Oral Sex Scene, Film (Heart of Darkness) with Randy Spears
