= Debbie Does Dallas... Again =

Debbie Does Dallas ... Again
- DVD cover
- Directed by: Paul Thomas
- Starring: Monique Alexander; Savanna Samson; Hillary Scott; Stefani Morgan; Sunny Leone
- Production company: Vivid Entertainment
- Release date: 2007
- Running time: 122 minutes
- Country: United States

Debbie Does Dallas... Again (Note: Sources vary on the spacing of the ellipsis.) is a 2007 American pornographic film directed by Paul Thomas and released through Vivid Entertainment. It was presented as a sequel to the 1978 pornographic classic Debbie Does Dallas (but it is not to be confused with Debbie Does Dallas Part II, a 1981 film, nor with Debbie Does Dallas Again, a 1993 film in the same series) The film features Monique Alexander, Savanna Samson, Hillary Scott, Stefani Morgan and Sunny Leone.

Thomas said rather than remaking the original, "I spun the story closest to Heaven Can Wait, where Debbie dies and is reincarnated in the body of another cheerleader."

On July 12, 2007, the movie became the first adult title licensed by the Advanced Access Content System (AACS) to be sold in the Blu-ray Disc format. It was also the first adult movie available in both HD DVD and Blu-ray formats. Other companies had released a very few adult films on Blu-ray by this point, but they were not copy-protected or licensed, and were burned in-house, some on BD-R discs.

== Documentary ==
Debbie Does Dallas Again (Note: Sources vary on the spacing and existence of the ellipsis.) was also the original name of a weekly, 30-minute behind the scenes documentary to the remaking of Debbie Does Dallas – from the casting search for the next Debbie, to planning and shooting of the movie. Renamed Debbie Loves Dallas in reruns (not to be confused with Eon McKai's 2007 film Debbie Loves Dallas), it was produced by World of Wonder.

== Cast ==
- Monique Alexander
- Savanna Samson
- Hillary Scott
- Stefani Morgan
- Sunny Leone
- Evan Stone
- Craig Crofton

== Awards and nominations ==
Year	Ceremony	Result	Category	Recipient(s)
2008	AVN Award	Won	Top Renting Title of the Year – 2007	—N/a
2008	AVN Award	Nominated	Best Actress, Film	Stefani Morgan
2008	AVN Award	Nominated	Best Anal Sex Scene, Film	Staci Thorn & Marty Romano
2008	AVN Award	Nominated	Best Art Direction, Film	—N/a
2008	AVN Award	Nominated	Best Cinematography	—N/a
2008	AVN Award	Nominated	Best Couples Sex Scene, Film	Stefani Morgan & Derrick Pierce
2008	AVN Award	Nominated	Best Editing, Film	Jack Freedom, Miles Rocca & Fletcher Martin
2008	AVN Award	Nominated	Best Film	—N/a
2008	AVN Award	Won	Best Group Sex Scene, Film	Stefani Morgan, Savanna Samson, Monique Alexander, Evan Stone, Christian & Jay Huntington
2008	AVN Award	Won	Best On-Line Marketing Campaign, Individual Project	—N/a
2008	AVN Award	Nominated	Best Overall Marketing Campaign, Individual Project	—N/a
2008	AVN Award	Nominated	Best Packaging	—N/a
2008	AVN Award	Nominated	Best Screenplay, Film	Phil Noir
2008	AVN Award	Nominated	Best Special Effects	—N/a
2008	AVN Award	Nominated	Best Supporting Actor, Film	Evan Stone
2008	AVN Award	Nominated	Best Supporting Actress, Film	Monique Alexander
2008	AVN Award	Nominated	Best Supporting Actress, Film	Hillary Scott
2008	FAME Award	Finalist	Favorite Feature Movie	—N/a
2008	Venus Award	Won	Best US Film	—N/a
2008	XRCO Award	Nominated	Most Outrageous DVD Xtras	—N/a
