= Raylene =

American pornographic film actress

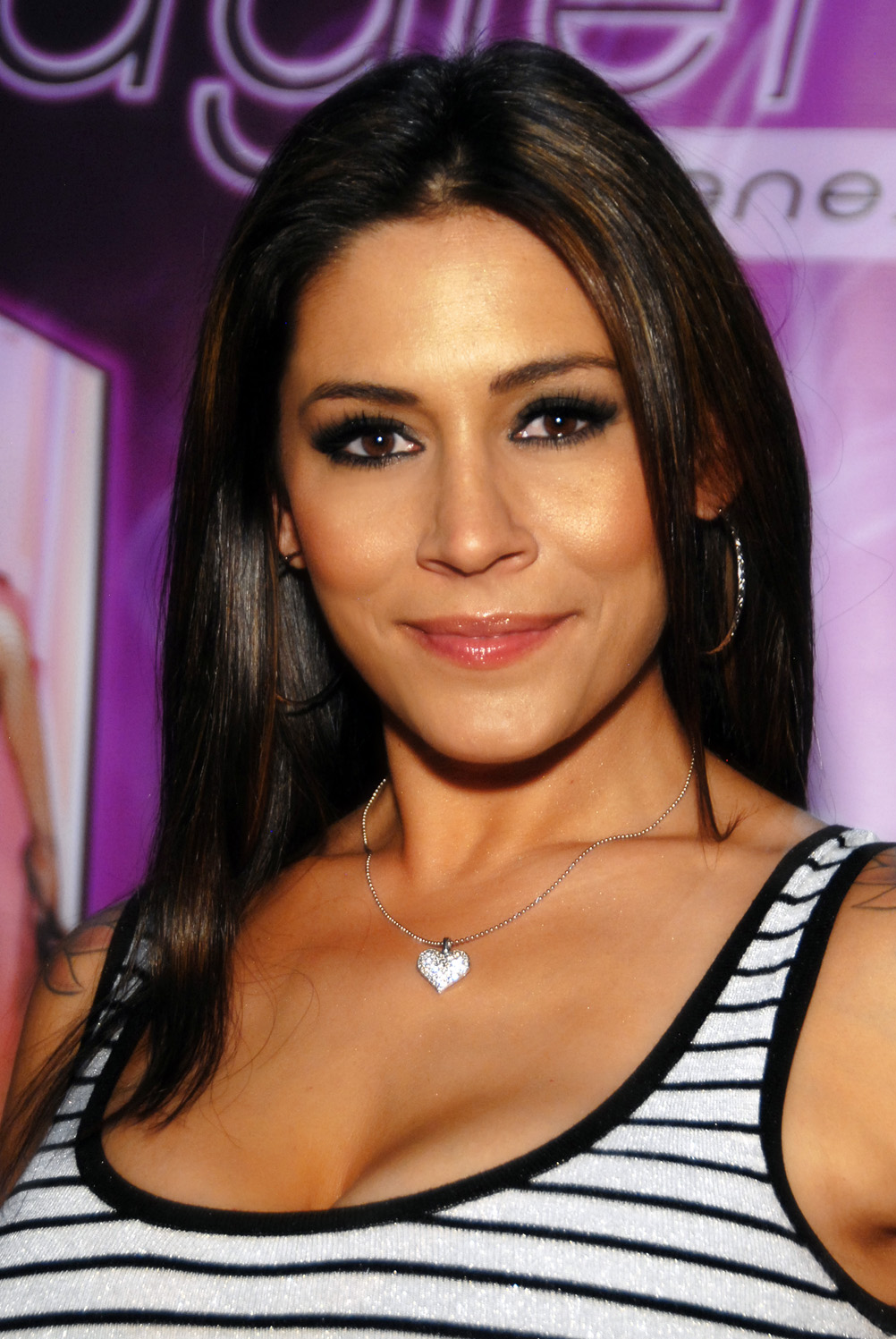
- Raylene in 2011
- Born: Stacey Bernstein; Glendora, California, U.S.
- Other names: Stacey Hirsch; Alexis Fontane
- Occupation: Pornographic film actress
- Spouse: Brad Hirsch (divorced)

Stacey Hirsch (née Bernstein), known professionally as Raylene, is an American pornographic film actress.

== Early life ==
Raylene was born and raised in Glendora, California. She is of Italian and Mexican descent on her mother's side. Her father is Jewish, of Polish and Austrian descent.

As a child, Raylene attended Christian schools. She was an honors student in high school and graduated at age 16, two years early. She said she had originally intended to pursue Christian studies at Azusa Pacific University and become a Christian high school teacher.

== Career ==
Raylene began acting when she was five years old. With help from her uncle, a television producer, she appeared on Hunter and 21 Jump Street. She had a non-speaking appearance on an episode of the HBO sketch comedy series Mr. Show.

Raylene made her pornographic film debut in 1998. She was a contract performer for Vivid Entertainment between May 1998 and November 2001, during which time she appeared in nearly 100 films.

Raylene retired from the adult film industry in 2001. After briefly touring as a striptease dancer, she found work as a real estate agent. While working in real estate, she brokered a sale to the AIM Health Care Foundation. She returned to performing in pornographic films with Raylene's Dirty Work in 2009.

== Personal life ==
Raylene was briefly married to Brad Hirsch, brother of Vivid Entertainment co-chairman Steve Hirsch.

== Awards ==
- 1999 XRCO Award – Starlet of the Year
- 2001 AVN Award – Best Actress (Film) – Artemesia (tied with Taylor Hayes – Jekyll and Hyde)
- 2008 AVN Hall of Fame
- 2017 XRCO Hall of Fame
