= Kylie Ireland =

American pornographic film actress

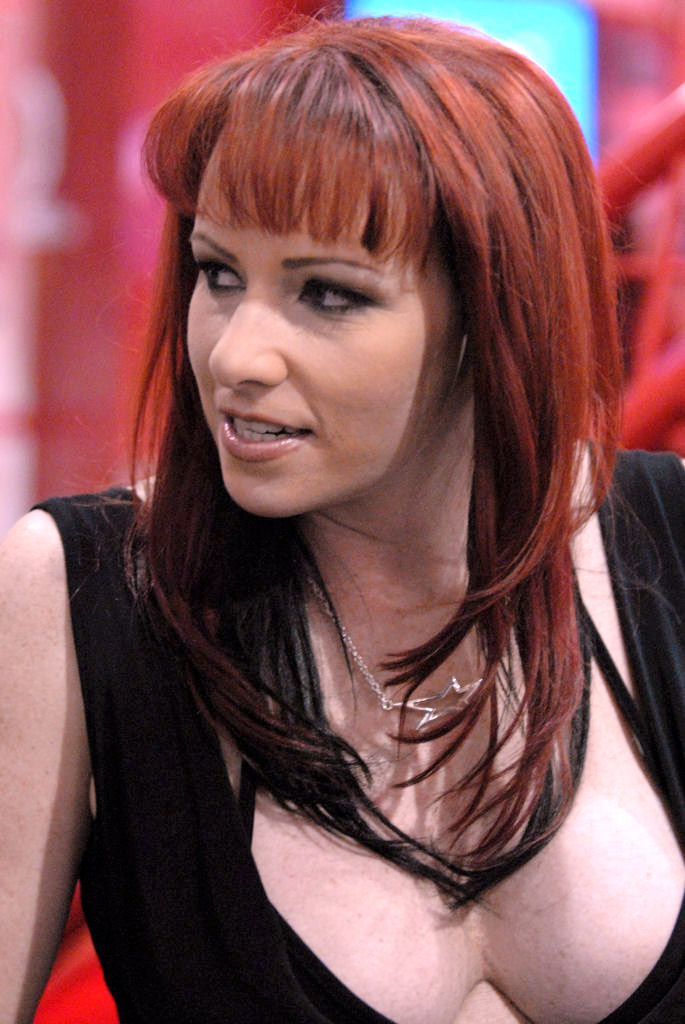
- Ireland in 2008
- Born: Longmont, Colorado, U.S.
- Other name: DeeKay
- Occupations: Pornographic actress; film director; producer; publicist; satellite radio show host

Kylie Ireland is an American pornographic actress, film director, producer, publicist, and satellite radio show host. She is an inductee into the AVN, XRCO, and NightMoves Halls of Fame.

== Early life and education ==
Ireland was born in Longmont, Colorado, a small community outside Denver. While going to high school and college in San Diego, Ireland worked part-time ordering videos for a chain of video stores, which she credits for learning a lot about pornographic films.

== Career ==
Ireland returned to Colorado to continue college partially in Boulder, Colorado, partially in Fort Collins, Colorado, and began to dance in a Fort Collins strip club. One of her first female lovers was a waitress at the same club who would become the pornographic actress Juli Ashton.

She entered the pornographic film industry in 1994, through an acquaintance with glamour photographer Warren Tang. Her first films were L'il Ms. Behaved, where she performed with Randy West, and Up & Cummers 10, with Jenna Jameson; she started at the same time as Jameson. Ireland moved to Los Angeles after her first five films, and performed in a total of 80 films her first year, before returning to Colorado intending to slow down her film work.

From 1995 to 2000, Ireland performed in exclusive contracts, starring in a few films per year, while traveling across America and Europe, striptease dancing and promoting her films. Her first contract, with Sin City Entertainment, was brief, and ended in a breach of contract small claims court lawsuit which went before Judge Judy on television; Ireland won. That was followed by a five-year contract with VCA Pictures. Ireland served as VCA's Director of Publicity from 1999 to 2000, before returning to performing freelance. Demonstrating that no hard feelings remained about the lawsuit, she had a one-month stint as Director of Publicity for Sin City in April 2003. In 1996, during her time at VCA, Ireland returned to her natural red hair.

=== Recognition ===
In January 1995, Ireland was awarded AVN Best New Starlet by Adult Video News Magazine. This would be the first of many adult film awards. Fans of X-Rated Entertainment awarded her the 'Vixen' award in 1995 and the 'Fan Favorite' in 1996. She was named by Playboy Magazine as one of their Top 10 Porn Stars for 1997. In 2001, AVN listed her among the Top 50 Porn Stars of All Time and in 2005 inducted her into the AVN Hall of Fame.

=== Directing ===
When her contract with VCA expired, Ireland directed her first movie, The Whore Next Door. Ireland continued to direct, first for Jewel De'Nyle at Platinum X Pictures, then other companies. In April 2006, she founded her own adult film company, SlutWerkz, which features women directors and Cross as head of production, producing, and starring in hardcore gonzo pornography. SlutWerkz launch was delayed from its planned fall 2007 to sometime in 2008 after replacing the original intended distributors. The company originally planned to release one film per month.

=== Internet ===
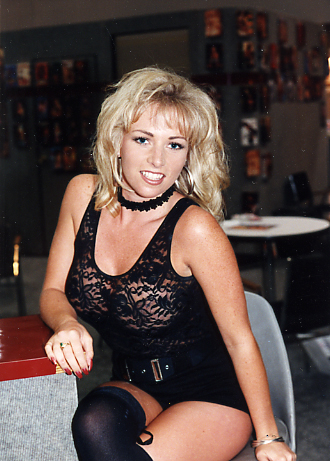
Ireland as a blonde, taken at the VSDA convention in Las Vegas, 1994

Ireland started her personal website in 1996, becoming one of the first pornographic actresses on the Web; she describes it as "my obsession." On her website, she would perform live sex shows that would receive 10,000 hits a day at $5 a hit during the late 1990s. She does Web consulting and public relations for other adult actresses.

=== Other ventures ===
From October 2003 to February 2006, Ireland hosted a weekly Internet radio show, Kylie Live on ksexradio.com, about the pornography industry. She won the KSEX Radio Listener's Choice Award for "Best Radio Voice" in 2004, and the "Best Insight into the Adult Business" award for 2005. In February 2006, Ireland became the host of sex talk show Private Calls, on Friday evenings for Playboy Radio on Sirius Radio.

In November 2010, Ireland launched a new weekend show on Spice radio called The Jerkbox. The show took over where The Friday Night Threeway left off. It features guest interviews, segments revolving around the world of sex and porn-related topics.

Around January 2011, Ireland started a website called Bombed Out LA along with her husband, which uses her love of photography to capture and publish street art in Los Angeles.

In March 2011, it was discovered after a television interview that Ireland was also street artist DeeKay.

In January 2013, after leaving Spice radio, Ireland joined the Toadhopnetwork and began The Wednesday Night Threeway, a weekly podcast with Raylene and Derrick Pierce.

In April 2013, Ireland launched her own weekly podcast channel along with her husband Andy Appleton called Apples & Pairs on SoundCloud.com.

== Personal life ==
Ireland says that she "dabbled" in recreational drug use, even before entering the adult industry; she tried most drugs, and used crystal meth for a time to stay thin, but her main drug of choice was alcohol. In 2001, she realized her drinking was becoming a problem.

In 2007, Ireland lived in a renovated 1927 10,000-square-foot (930 m^{2}) warehouse loft in downtown Los Angeles with pornographic director Eli Cross, her boyfriend of six years.

== Awards ==
- 1995 AVN Award – Best New Starlet
- 1995 F.O.X.E. Award – Vixen
- 1995 NightMoves Award – Best Actress
- 1996 F.O.X.E. Award – Fan Favorite
- 2005 AVN Hall of Fame
- 2006 XRCO Hall of Fame
- 2007 NightMoves Triple Play Award (Dancing/Performing/Directing)
- 2008 XRCO Award – MILF of the Year
- 2008 AVN Award – Best Supporting Actress - Film – Layout
- 2008 AVN Award – Best Oral Scene - Film – Layout
- 2009 NightMoves Award – Best All-Girl Release (Editor's Choice) – The Violation of Kylie Ireland
- 2009 NightMoves Hall of Fame
- 2025 XMA Award – Best Art Direction – Gold Diggers (with Andy Appleton)
- 2026 XMA Award – Best Art Direction – Deadly Vows (with Andy Appleton)
