= Steven Hirsch =

American pornographer

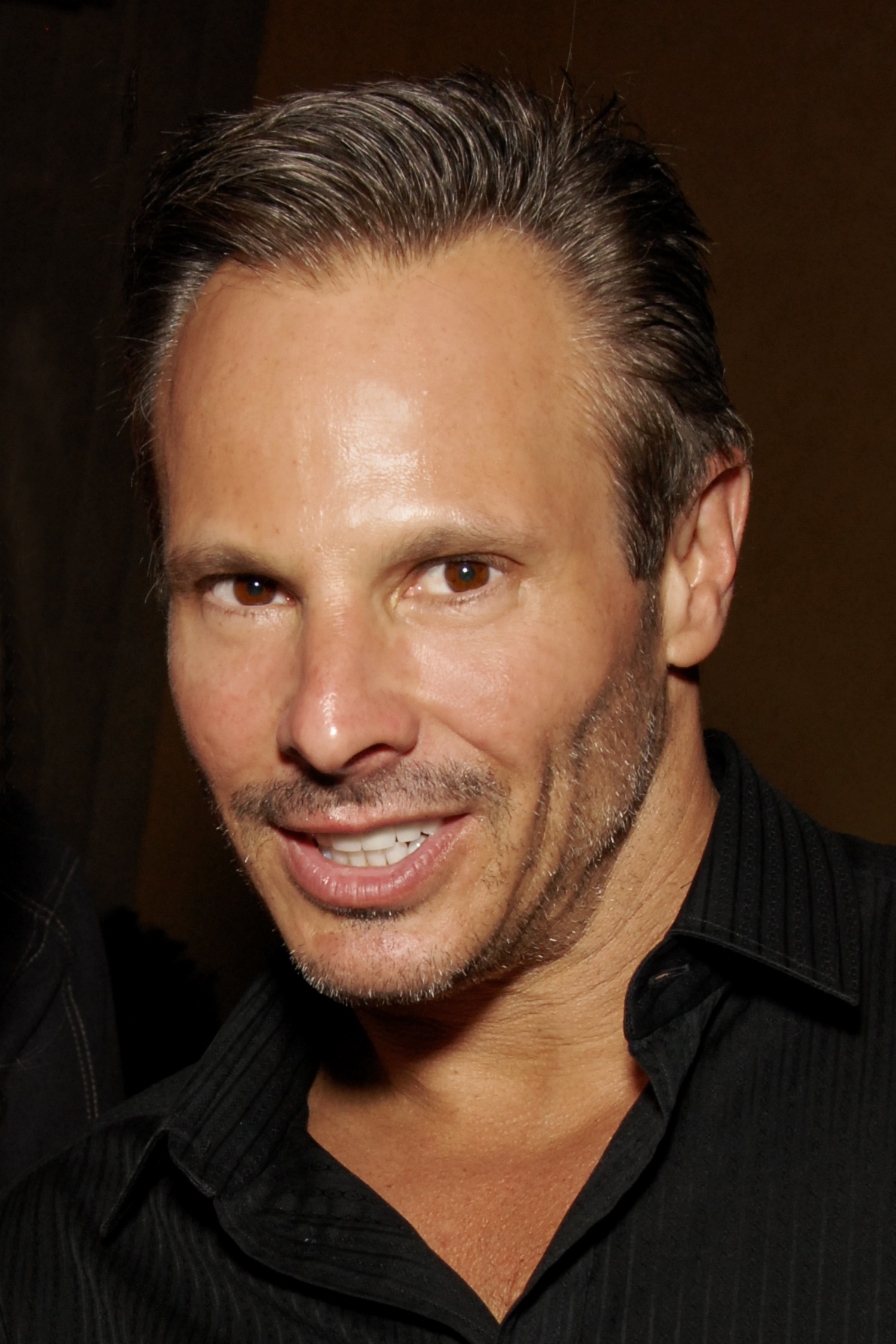
- Hirsch in 2009
- Born: May 25, 1961 (age 65); Lyndhurst, Ohio, U.S.
- Occupation: Businessman
- Known for: Founder and Co-Chairman of Vivid Entertainment

Steven Hirsch (born May 25, 1961) is an American businessman who is the founder and co-chairman of the adult entertainment company Vivid Entertainment, which he founded in 1984. It has been estimated to be the top adult entertainment company.

== Career ==
=== Tenure at Vivid Entertainment ===
The second generation of his family to be in the business, he is credited by AVN as the creative visionary who saw the potential to change the nature of the adult entertainment industry. Hirsch and his original partner, David James, an industry veteran with extensive international experience, were later joined by a third partner, Bill Asher, a Dartmouth College graduate with an MBA from the University of Southern California, who has engineered the company's recent financial success through a series of transactions and alliances. The three are co-chairmen of the company.

In addition to a hardcover book with HarperCollins, Hirsch developed Vivid Comix and graphic novels with Avatar Press and erotic novels with Thunder’s Mouth Press. The faces of Vivid Girls have appeared on billboards in high traffic venues such as Sunset Boulevard and Times Square.

== Appearances ==
The 2004 pseudo-documentary TV series Porno Valley, documents Hirsch's private life and family, and interaction between Hirsch and his Vivid dream.

Two additional seven-party reality series were seen on Showtime. Deeper Throat covered the remaking of the classic adult movie and Debbie Does Dallas Again was about the trials of getting permission to remake this all-time favorite.

== Accolades ==
In 2012 Hirsch received the first Adult Video News Visionary Award at a gala ceremony in Las Vegas. According to Paul Fishbein, founder of AVN, "Nobody in the modern era of the adult industry has been more innovative in mainstreaming their company image than Vivid. That made them one of the premier brands in all of Hollywood, adult or otherwise. Steve and the company are truly deserving of this achievement."

== Advocacy ==
Hirsch opposed Measure B, a law passed in Los Angeles County on November 5, 2012, that requires all performers in adult films to wear condoms when filming sex scenes. Hirsch expressed confidence that the law, which was passed by 56 percent of voters, would be overturned on the grounds that it violates filmmakers' First Amendment rights, but stated that failing this, Vivid would move production out of Los Angeles County to survive, commenting, "There have been obscenity prosecutions, but this is something on a whole different level."

== Personal life ==
Hirsch was born in Lyndhurst, Ohio. Hirsch operates his company with his sister, Marci, who was inducted into the AVN Hall of Fame in 2015. He is the father of two children (Alexa and Jack Hirsch) with his ex-wife.
