= Sunny Lane =

American pornographic actress (born 1980)

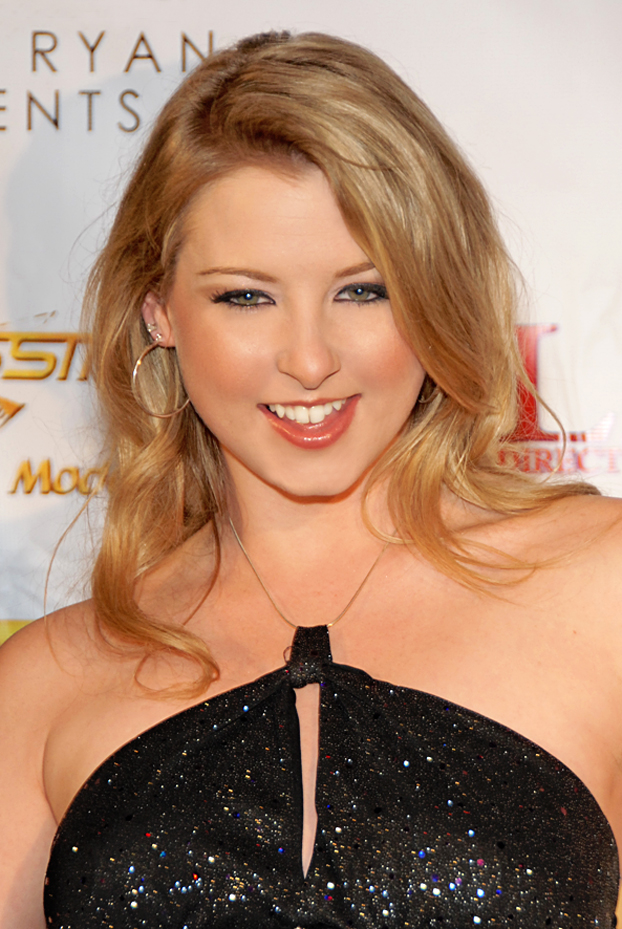
- Lane in 2009
- Born: Georgia, U.S.
- Other names: Sunny; Sunshine Lane
- Occupations: Pornographic actress; erotic model
- Height: 5 ft (152 cm)
- Website: sunnylanelive.com

Sunny Lane is an American pornographic actress and erotic model. She is a member of the NightMoves, AVN, and XRCO Halls of Fame.

== Biography ==
Lane's parents worked in airfreight. In her youth, she was a competitive roller skater and ice skater, and later worked as an instructor teaching yoga and pilates.

She trained as an ice dancer under James Millns and was in preparation for the Olympic trials when she required bunion surgery. Unable to skate due to the recovery period, she started dancing nude in order to support herself financially. She became an exotic dancer and won Déjà Vu Showgirl of the Year during her first year of dancing in 2004. Lane was invited to attend the AVN Awards ceremony in 2005 by Serenity, where, at an after-show party hosted by Sean Michaels, she encountered an agent from Playboy. She started to appear in adult movies that same year.

Her career is supported and managed by her parents. Lane credits her parents' participation in naturist recreation, and generalized "free thinking" and "open-minded" attitudes for their comfort with her involvement in the adult entertainment industry. She attributes the ease with which she was able to transition from ice skating to adult entertainment to the body image instilled by her own practice of naturism with her parents at home during her childhood.

She appeared on the first episode of the Fox reality series My Bare Lady, which aired December 7, 2006, and on an episode of ABC Primetime: The Outsiders defending her career. Television audiences also saw her with her parents on Fox News' Geraldo at Large on March 18, 2007, using the alias, "Sunny Lee." Lane was featured on the television show Pants-Off Dance-Off on Fuse TV.

She has also worked at a Nevada brothel, the Moonlite BunnyRanch, at various times in her career.

Her performance in the 2007 film Goo Girls 26 earned Lane the 2008 AVN Award for Best POV Sex Scene. In 2008 she starred in Big Wet Asses 13 performing her first anal scene; the scene won the AVN Award for best anal scene.

Lane is a fan of Paramore and playing racing video games.

She is bisexual. In June 2011, Lane announced that she was engaged and was taking a hiatus from making adult films in order to concentrate on her upcoming marriage.

In November 2012, she announced her return to the adult industry to star in Not the Love Boat XXX and other adult movies as well as to entertain clients at the Moonlite BunnyRanch.

== Awards ==
- 2005 NightMoves Award – Best New Starlet (Editor's Choice)
- 2006 AEBN VOD Award – Best Newcomer
- 2006 FOXE Award – Vixen
- 2006 NightMoves Award – Miss Congeniality
- 2007 Adam Film World Guide Award – Actress of the Year – Sex Pix
- 2007 Adultcon Award – Best Actress for an Intercourse Performance – Slut Puppies 2
- 2008 AVN Award – Best POV Sex Scene – Goo Girls 26
- 2008 NightMoves Award – Best Feature Dancer (Fan's Choice)
- 2009 AVN Award – Best Anal Sex Scene – Big Wet Asses 13
- 2009 Booble.com – May Cover Girl of the Month
- 2014 XRCO Award – Best Cumback
- 2014 NightMoves Hall of Fame
- 2020 AVN Hall of Fame
- 2021 XRCO Hall of Fame
