= Briana Banks =

American pornographic actress and model (born 1978)

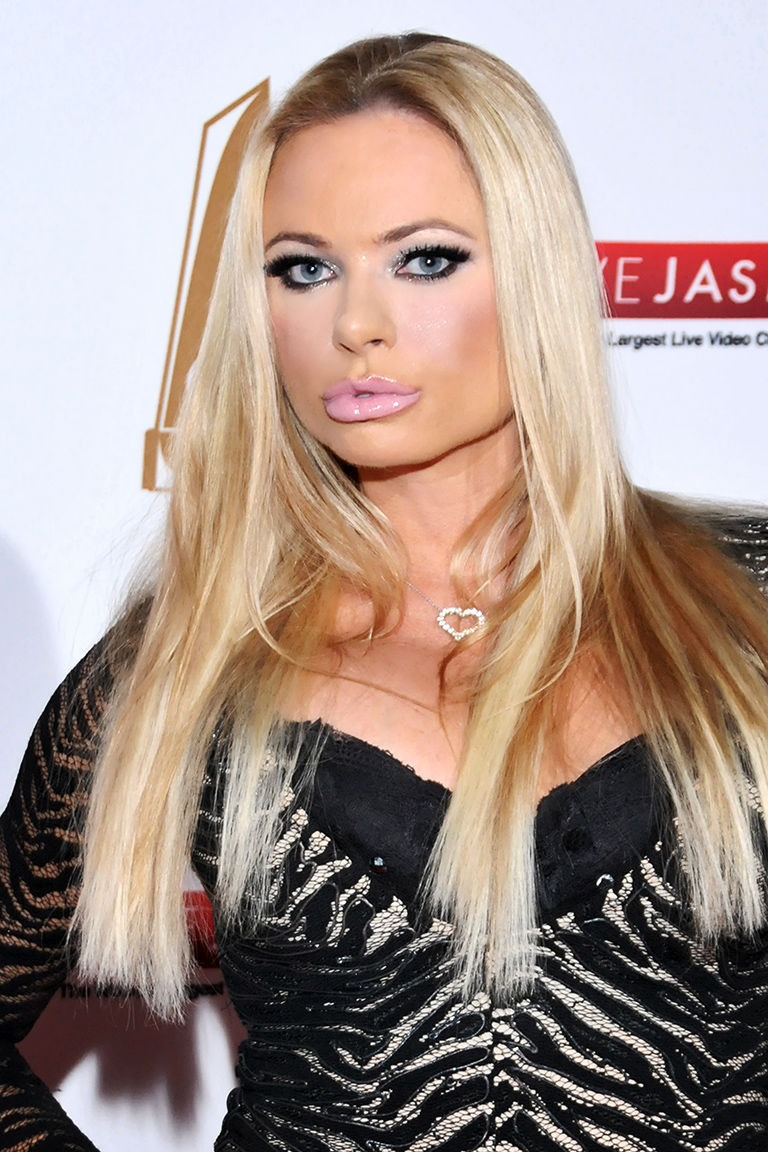
- Banks in 2016
- Born: 21 May 1978 (age 47); Munich, West Germany
- Other name: Mirage
- Occupations: Pornographic actress; model
- Height: 5 ft 10 in (1.78 m)

Briana Banks (born 21 May 1978) is a German pornographic actress and model. She was the Penthouse Pet of the Month for June 2001. She is a member of the AVN Hall of Fame and XRCO Hall of Fame.

== Early life ==
Banks was born in Munich, Germany to a German father and an American mother. They moved to Britain when she was four, then to the Los Angeles suburb of Simi Valley when she was seven.

== Career ==
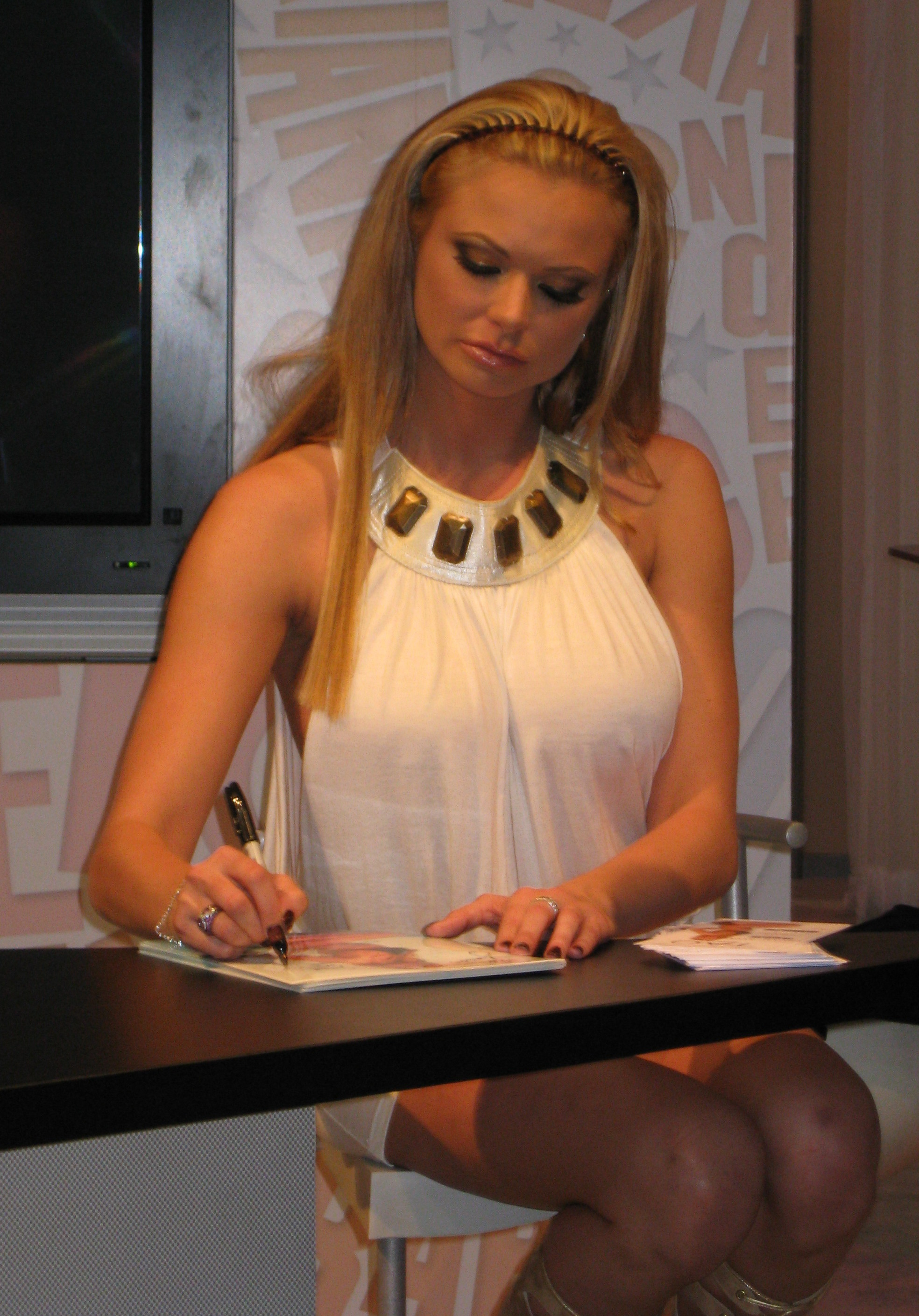
Banks in 2008

Banks modeled as a teenager, appearing on a cover of Teen magazine. She entered the industry under the name "Mirage", but began calling herself "Briana Banks" in 1999, after having the first of two breast enlargement operations. Having had aspirations of being a supermodel, she chose the professional surname "Banks" after model Tyra Banks. Her first appearance using the new name was in the film Decadent Whores 9.

In June 2001, Banks was Penthouse magazine's Pet of the Month.

On 13 October 2006, Banks reportedly filed a federal lawsuit seeking more than US$75,000 in damages against Doc Johnson Enterprises, charging that they had created unauthorized products from molds of her genitals.

Starting in 2006, Banks went on hiatus from performing in videos and returned in 2008. That same year she was also nominated for five AVN Awards at the 25th annual Adult Entertainment Expo in Las Vegas.

In 2009, she was inducted into the AVN Hall of Fame.

In 2011, Banks starred in the porn parody version of the Fox animated series American Dad!, American Dad XXX: An Exquisite Films Parody. Banks portrayed the character of Francine Smith and was featured on the video's box cover. The video was released in September 2011.

On 28 December 2015 Briana Banks announced that she was making a comeback in 2016 after a 5-year hiatus. The same year she was inducted into the XRCO Hall of Fame.

=== Appearances ===
Banks was featured in the thirteen episode cable television series Vivid Valley produced by World of Wonder that was broadcast in Europe in 2005 and later had a successful run on Playboy TV. The series featured stories about the real lives of then Vivid Girls Jenna Jameson, Savanna Samson, Mercedez, Tawny Roberts, Banks, and others.

=== Other ventures ===
In 2002 Banks was one of the first porn actresses to have an action figure made in her likeness, by Los Angeles-based Cyber F/X and Sota Toys.

== Awards and nominations ==
Year	Ceremony	Result	Category	Work
2001	AVN Award	Nominated	Most Outrageous Sex Scene (with Mark Cummings)	Perverted Stories 28
2001	Hot d'Or Award	Won	Best New American Starlet	—N/a
2001	NightMoves Award	Won	Best New Starlet (Fan's Choice)	—N/a
2001	XRCO Award	Nominated	Starlet of the Year	—N/a
2001	XRCO Award	Nominated	Orgasmic Oralist	—N/a
2002	AVN Award	Nominated	Best Group Sex Scene - Film (with Lola, Aurora Snow & Joey Ray)	Taboo 2001
2002	AVN Award	Nominated	Best Group Sex Scene - Video (with Justine Romee & Joel Lawrence)	Tails of Perversity 8
2002	XRCO Award	Nominated	Best Girl-Girl Sex Scene (with Jenna Jameson)	My Plaything Jenna Jameson
2003	AVN Award	Nominated	Female Performer of the Year	—N/a
2003	AVN Award	Nominated	Best Group Sex Scene - Film (with Chandler, Michele Raven, Cheyne Collins, Dale DaBone & Pat Myne)	Vision
2003	AVN Award	Nominated	Best All-Girl Sex Scene - Video (with Jenna Jameson)	Briana Loves Jenna
2003	XRCO Award	Nominated	Best Girl-Girl Scene (with Jenna Jameson)	Briana Loves Jenna
2003	AFWG Award	Won	Best All-Girl Sex Scene - Video (with Jenna Jameson)	Briana Loves Jenna
2004	AVN Award	Nominated	Best Supporting Actress - Video	Tricks
2005	Exotic Dancer Award	Won	Adult Movie Feature	—N/a
2006	AVN Award	Nominated	Crossover Star of the Year	—N/a
2007	AVN Award	Nominated	Contract Star of the Year	Vivid Entertainment
2008	AVN Award	Nominated	Best Actress – Film	Layout
2008	AVN Award	Nominated	Best All-Girl Sex Scene - Film (with Penny Flame)	Layout
2008	AVN Award	Nominated	Best Anal Sex Scene - Film (with Kurt Lockwood)	Layout
2008	AVN Award	Nominated	Best Group Sex Scene - Film (with Hillary Scott, Evan Stone & Brooke Haven)	Layout
2008	AVN Award	Nominated	Best All-Girl Sex Scene - Video	Where the Boys Aren't 18
2009	AVN Award	Nominated	Best All-Girl Group Sex Scene (with Lanny Barby, Lexie Marie, Nina Mercedez, Monique Alexander, Savanna Samson, Stefani Morgan, Tawny Roberts, Tera Patrick, Lacey & Lyndsey Love)	Where the Boys Aren't 19: Arabian Nights
2009	AVN Award	Nominated	Best Anal Sex Scene (with Manuel Ferrara)	Perfect Match
2009	AVN Award	Nominated	Best Group Sex Scene (with Mick Blue, Michael Stefano & John Strong)	Perfect Match
2009	AVN Award	Won	Hall of Fame	—N/a
2010	AVN Award	Nominated	Best Double Penetration Sex Scene (with Ben English & Otto Bauer)	Flashback
2016	XRCO Award	Won	Hall of Fame	—N/a
2017	XRCO Award	Won	Best Cumback	—N/a
