= Hillary Scott (actress) =

American pornographic film actress and director (born 1982/1983)

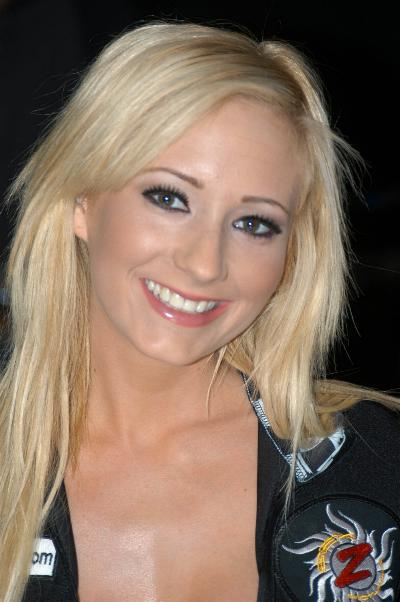
- Scott in 2007
- Born: 1982 or 1983 (age 43–44)
- Occupation: Pornographic film actress

Hillary Scott (born 1982 or 1983) is an American former pornographic film actress. She won the 2007 XRCO, AFWG, and AVN Female Performer of the Year Awards and the NightMoves and AVN Award for Best Actress. In 2016, she was inducted into the XRCO Hall of Fame. In 2024, she was inducted into the AVN Hall of Fame.

== Career ==
Scott starred in the 2007 film Corruption, which won seven AVN Awards, including Best Actress – Video. She replaced Jessica Sweet in the role of "Britney Rears" for the films Britney Rears 3: Britney Gets Shafted and Britney Rears 4: Britney Goes Gonzo.

Hillary Scott and Sex Z Pictures parted ways just a little over two years into a five-year exclusive performing and directing contract.

== Awards ==
Scott holds the record for the most XRCO Awards won by a performer in one night, winning Female Performer of the Year, Best Actress, Orgasmic Analist, Orgasmic Oralist, and Superslut at the 2007 XRCO Awards show.

Hillary Scott awards and nominations
Awards and nominations
Award	Wins	Nominations
Adam Film World	1	1
Adultcon Awards	1	1
AVN Awards	7	32
F.A.M.E. Awards	1	15
NightMoves Awards	1	1
XRCO Awards	9	11

Totals (Note: Certain award groups do not simply award one winner. They acknowledge several different recipients, have runners-up, and have third place. Since this is a specific recognition and is different from losing an award, runner-up mentions are considered wins in this award tally. For simplification and to avoid errors, each award in this list has been presumed to have had a prior nomination.)
- Wins: 20
- Nominations: 61

Year	Ceremony	Category	Work	
2006	AVN Award	Best Oral Sex Scene - Film (with Alicia Alighatti & Randy Spears)	Dark Side	
2006	AVN Award	Best Group Sex Scene - Film (with Alicia Alighatti, Penny Flame, Dillan Lauren, Randy Spears, & John West)	Dark Side	
2006	XRCO Award	New Starlet	Dark Side	—N/a
2006	XRCO Award	Orgasmic Oralist		—N/a
2006	2007	AVN Award	Female Performer of the Year	—N/a
Best Actress - Video	2007	AVN Award	Corruption	
Adultcon Award	2007	Best Actress - Anal/Vaginal Performance	Corruption	
XRCO Award	2007	Single Performance - Actress	Corruption	
XRCO Award	2007	Female Performer of the Year	—N/a	
XRCO Award	2007	Superslut	—N/a	
XRCO Award	2007	Orgasmic Oralist	—N/a	
XRCO Award	2007	Orgasmic Analist	—N/a	
Adam Film World Guide Award	2007	Female Performer Of The Year	—N/a	
NightMoves Award	2007	Best Actress (Editor's Choice)	—N/a	
2008	AVN Award	Best Supporting Actress - Video	Upload	
2008	XRCO Award	Orgasmic Analist	—N/a	
2008	F.A.M.E. Award	Dirtiest Girl in Porn	—N/a	
2009	AVN Award	Best Group Sex Scene (with Heidi Mayne, Mark Davis, Alec Knight, Cheyne Collins, & Alex Sanders)	Icon	
2016	XRCO Award	Hall of Fame	—N/a	
2024	AVN Award	Hall of Fame	—N/a	

Other nominations

- 2006 FAME Nominations
- 2007 FAME Nominations
- 2009 AVN Nominations
- 2009 FAME Nominations
- 2009 XRCO Nominations and Winners
- 2010 AVN Nominations
- 2010 FAME Nominations
- 2011 AVN Nominations
- 2012 AVN Nominations
