= Adultcon =

Trade fair in the United States

- Genre: Pornographic film
- Frequency: triannual
- Inaugurated: 2001; 25 years ago
- Website: www.adultcon.com

Adultcon is a pornographic film trade fair in the United States. The event takes place three times per year, usually with two conferences in Los Angeles, California at the Los Angeles Convention Center, and one conference in Las Vegas Valley, Nevada. The event was established in 2001.

Adultcon hosted an Adultcon award ceremony in 2007.

In July 2011, Adultcon canceled its two shows in Los Angeles because the Los Angeles Convention Center hosted two competing pornography conferences around the same times of year.
