= Vivid Entertainment =

American adult entertainment studio

- Type: Private
- Industry: Pornography
- Founded: 1984; 42 years ago
- Founders: Steven Hirsch; David James
- Headquarters: Los Angeles, California, United States
- Products: Pornographic films
- Owners: Steven Hirsch; Bill Asher
- Website: https://www.vivid.com/

Vivid Entertainment Group is an American independent pornographic film production company, featuring internet content.

== Overview ==
Vivid Entertainment is privately owned by Americans Steven Hirsch and Bill Asher, and Welshman David James.

In 2006, Vivid Entertainment was described by Reuters as one of the handful of studios that dominate the U.S. porn industry. It is based in Los Angeles, California. Founder Steven Hirsch is co-chairman, along with Bill Asher, who is also a co-owner.

In February 2006, Vivid changed its condom-only policy to a condom-optional policy that lets performers decide whether to use them. In October 2010, Vivid stopped production as a precaution when an actor tested positive for HIV. An October 2012 open letter, from Steven Hirsch, took aim at a Los Angeles County plan that would require performers to wear condoms on set. Hirsch said the proposal would be costly and ineffective and was an example of unnecessary government intrusion into private bedrooms.

== Divisions and ventures ==
- Alt-porn: In 2009, the company won the AVN Award for Best Music Soundtrack for The Bad Luck Betties, and in 2010, for the musical soundtrack of Live in My Secrets.
- Vivid Radio: Vivid supplied content for a channel on the Sirius XM Radio network that features its various stars. The channel moved to online only on July 17, 2014.

== List of Vivid Girls ==
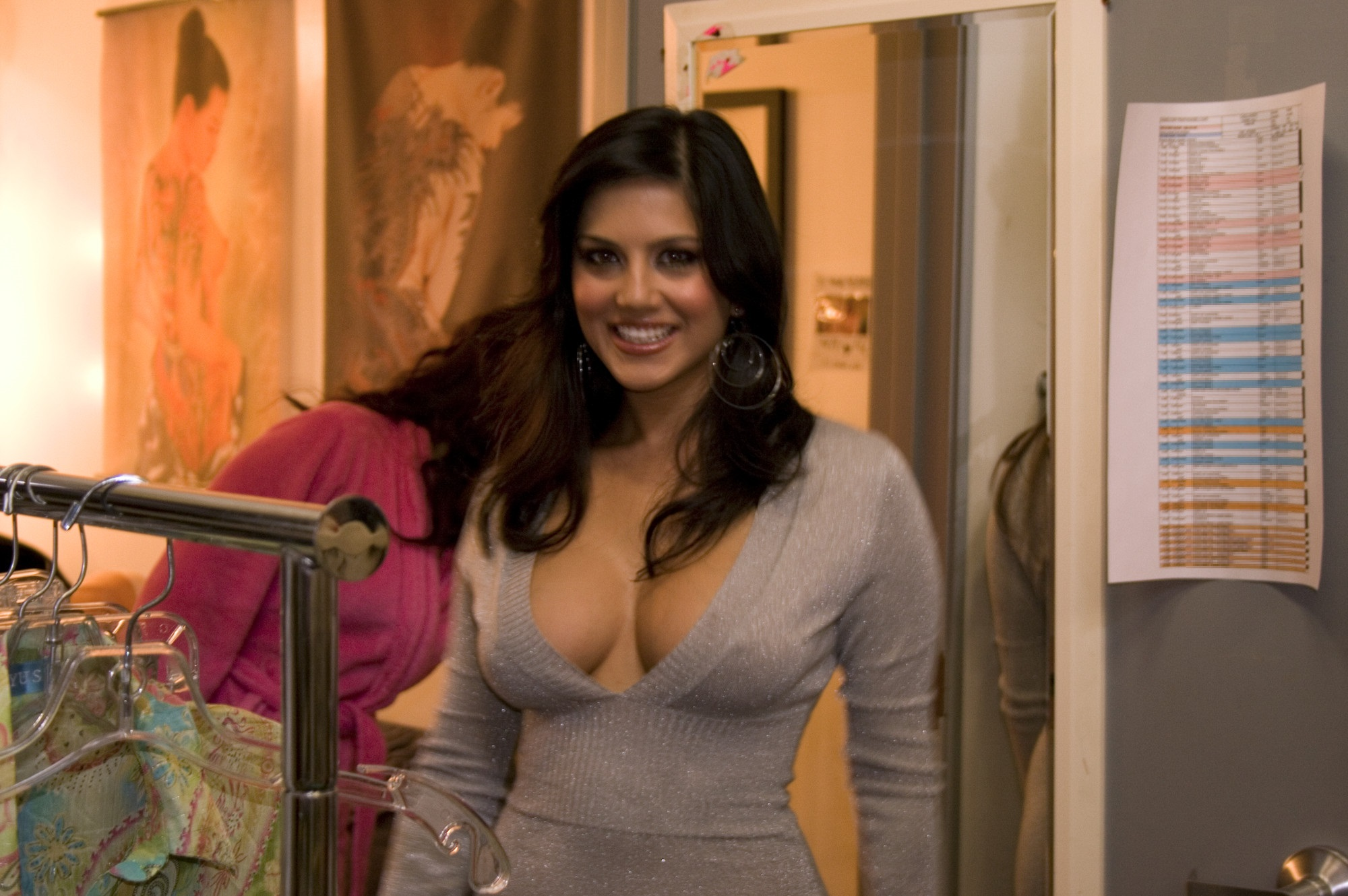
Sunny Leone

This is a list of Vivid actresses (known as "Vivid Girls") during its first thirty years. The Vivid Girl, Allie Haze, terminated her contract with Vivid in 2012.

- Asia Carrera
- Barbara Dare
- Briana Banks
- Chasey Lain
- Chloe Jones
- Christy Canyon
- Deidre Holland
- Devon
- Dyanna Lauren
- Ginger Lynn
- Heather Hunter
- Hyapatia Lee
- Janine Lindemulder
- Jenna Jameson
- Julia Ann
- Kayden Kross
- Kobe Tai
- Nikki Charm
- Nikki Randall
- Nikki Tyler
- Racquel Darrian
- Raylene
- Savanna Samson
- Savannah
- Sunny Leone
- Sunrise Adams
- Taylor Hayes
- Tera Patrick
- Tiffany Taylor
- Tori Welles

== Legal controversy ==
On December 6, 2007, Vivid Entertainment filed a copyright infringement lawsuit against PornoTube. The lawsuit alleged that the YouTube-like site profits from the illegal posting of Vivid's copyrighted films, and failed to comply with the Child Protection and Obscenity Enforcement Act, a federal age-verification and record-keeping law that applies to the adult film industry. The case was settled out of court.

== Awards and recognition ==
- 1987 AVN Award – 'Best Video Feature' for Blame it on Ginger
- 1991 AVN Award – 'Best Vignette Release' for Beat the Heat
- 1992 AVN Award – 'Best Vignette Release' for Scarlet Fantasy
- 1992 AVN Award – 'Top Renting Release of the Year' for The Masseuse
- 1992 AVN Award – 'Best Film' for On Trial
- 1997 AVN Award – 'Best Film' for Bobby Sox
- 1998 AVN Award – 'Best Film' for Bad Wives
- 2000 AVN Award – 'Best Film' for Seven Deadly Sins
- 2002 AVN Award – 'Best Film' for Fade To Black
- 2003 AVN Award – 'Top Selling Release of the Year' for Brianna Loves Jenna
- 2003 AVN Award – 'Top Renting Release of the Year' for Brianna Loves Jenna
- 2004 AVN Award – 'Best Film' for Heart of Darkness
- 2005 AVN Award – 'Best Film' for The Masseuse
- 2005 AVN Award – 'Best Video Feature' for Bella Loves Jenna
- 2006 AVN Award – 'Best Film' for The New Devil in Miss Jones
- 2006 AVN Award – 'Top Renting Release of the Year' for The Masseuse
- 2007 AVN Award – 'Best Gonzo Release' for Chemistry
- 2007 AVN Award – 'Best Interactive CD-ROM – Game' for Virtual Vivid Girl Sunny Leone
- 2008 AVN Award – Top Renting Title of the Year – 2007' for Debbie Does Dallas ... Again
- 2008 AVN Award – 'Best Film' for Layout
- 2008 AVN Award – 'Best Pro-Am Series' for Filthy's First Taste
- 2009 AVN Award – 'Best Music Soundtrack' – The Bad Luck Betties
- 2009 AVN Award – 'Best Educational Release' for Tristan Taormino's Expert Guide to Oral Sex 2
- 2009 AVN Award – 'Best Film' for Cry Wolf
- 2010 AVN Awards – Throat: A Cautionary Tale won five awards
- 2010 AVN Award – 'Best Overall Marketing Campaign – Company Image'
- 2010 AVN Award – 'Best Music Soundtrack' – Live in My Secrets – Vivid-Alt
- 2010 AVN Award – Vivid Ed for 'Best Educational Release' – Tristan Taormino's Expert Guide to Threesomes
- 2010 AVN Award – 'Best Pro-Am Series' Brand New Faces
- 2010 XBIZ Award Nominee – Studio of the Year
- 2010 XBIZ Award Nominee – Feature Movie of the Year for Faithless
- 2010 XBIZ Award Nominee – Feature Movie of the Year for Throat: A Cautionary Tale
- 2010 XBIZ Award Nominee – Feature Movie of the Year for Live In My Secrets (Vivid-Alt)
- 2010 XBIZ Award – 'Marketing Campaign of the Year' – Throat: A Cautionary Tale
- 2012 XBIZ Award – 'Marketing Campaign of the Year' – Spider-Man XXX
- 2013 XBIZ Award Nominee – 'Studio of the Year', 'Parody Release of the Year-Comedy' for Star Wars XXX: A Porn Parody; also 'Parody Release of the Year-Drama' for The Avengers XXX: A Porn Parody and The Dark Knight XXX: A Porn Parody. Additional nominations include: 'All-Sex Series of the Year for Brand New Faces, 'Vignette Release of the Year' for Allie Haze: True Sex and Goddess
- 2013 XBIZ Award – 'Vignette Release of the Year' – Allie Haze: True Sex
- 2013 XBIZ Award – 'Parody Release of the Year – Comedy' – Star Wars XXX: A Porn Parody
- 2014 XBIZ Award – 'Parody Release of the Year – Drama' – Superman vs. Spider-Man: An Axel Braun Parody and 'Couples-Themed Release of the Year' – Orgy University,
- 2015 XBIZ Award – 'Feature Movie of the Year' – Wetwork
- 2015 XBIZ Award – 'Best Art Direction' – Wetwork
