= Savanna Samson =

American pornographic actress (born 1967)

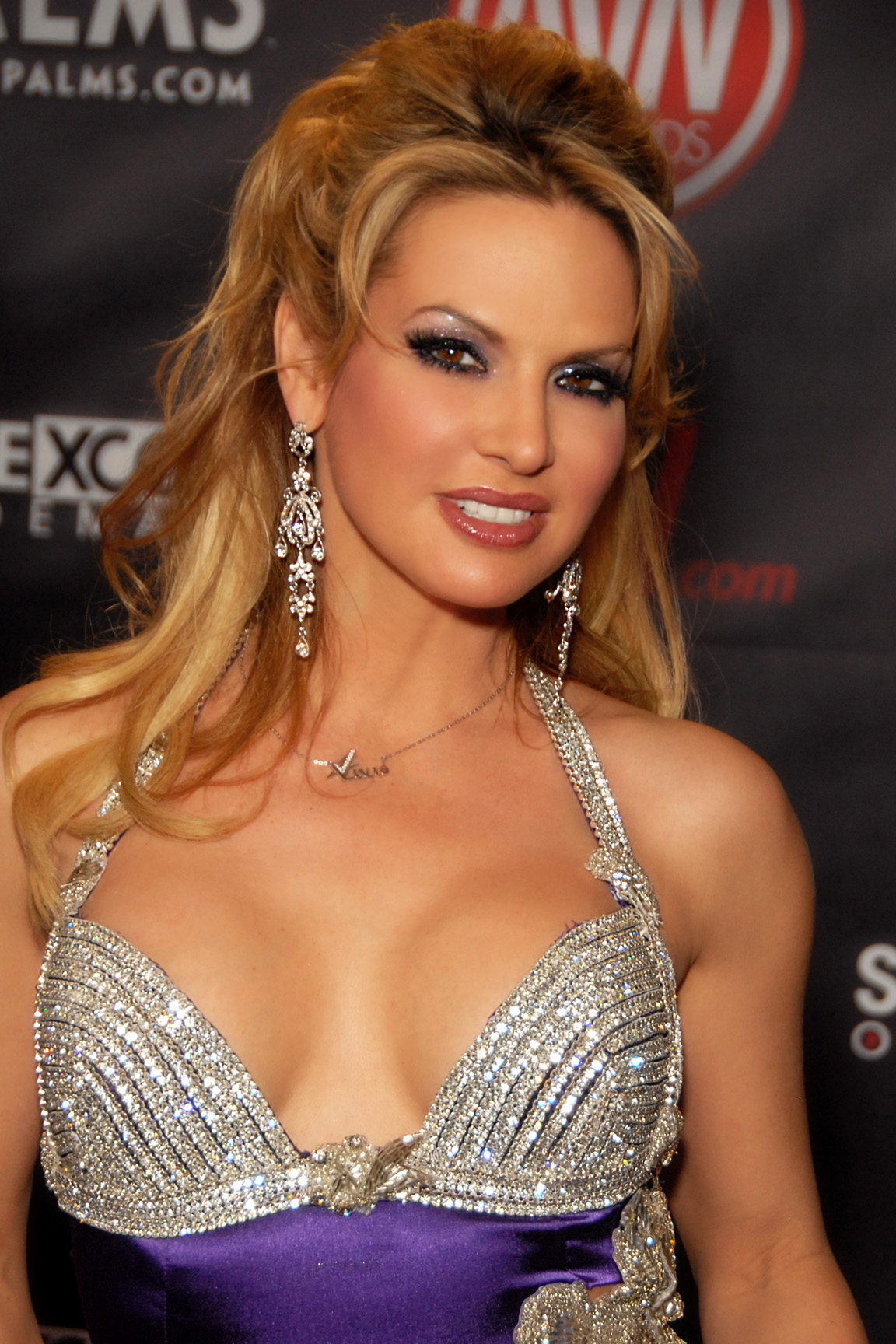
- Samson attending the AVN Awards Show at the Palms Casino Resort, Las Vegas, Nevada, January 2010
- Born: October 14, 1967 (age 59)
- Other names: Savanah Samson; Savanah; Savanna Samson; Savanna
- Occupation: Pornographic actress
- Height: 5 ft 5 in (1.65 m)

Natalie Oliveros (born October 14, 1967), better known by her stage name Savanna Samson, is an American former pornographic actress. The winner of several AVN Awards, she has spent most of her career as a contract performer with major producer Vivid Entertainment, and is known for her roles in acclaimed adult films such as The New Devil in Miss Jones. In addition to performing, she has her own adult film studio, Savanna Samson Productions. A native of upstate New York, she entered the adult film industry in 2000, after working as a dancer at the Manhattan strip club, Scores.

Samson has gained mainstream recognition with appearances on television shows such as Saturday Night Live, The Daily Show and 30 Rock. Her wide range of activities outside pornography include working as a sex-advice columnist, a radio presenter and a political correspondent. She also produces her own line of wines, has a recording contract with E1 Music and is a trained ballerina.

== Early life ==
Born Natalie Skeldon, one of five daughters, she grew up in a Roman Catholic family in Watertown, New York. She began dancing at a young age. At 17, she moved to New York City to pursue a career in ballet. However, she eventually gave this up, admitting she "wasn't good enough". She took a job dancing at the Manhattan strip club Scores, on the recommendation of her sister who worked there. When starting at the club, she chose the stage name Savanna in homage to a character in the novel and film, The Prince of Tides (1986/1991).

In 2000, she left that work as a dancer intending to become a porn film star. She choose the name Savanna Samson. The surname Samson, taken from the biblical figure, was added later in her career to distinguish her from porn actress Savannah. While at Scores, she met her future husband, wine merchant Daniel Oliveros. They have a son together.

== Adult film career ==
Samson's move into the adult film business began in 2000, after she wrote a letter to Italian porn actor and director Rocco Siffredi, asking to work with him. She initially wanted to make a movie in order to fulfill a fantasy, after her husband had given her the idea, and hoped to keep it a secret. But her first movie, Rocco Meats An American Angel In Paris, was nominated for "Best Foreign Release" at the AVN Awards. Afterward, she got what she described as "porn fever" and worked to make further movies. Her family soon discovered her film career when she appeared on The Howard Stern Show and Entertainment Tonight. Samson stated in 2006: "My parents are devastated by my career choices".

In April 2002, she signed an exclusive contract with Vivid Entertainment. She continued to live in New York, and commuted to California to shoot films for the company. Samson was among three Vivid Girls to be profiled in an early-2003 issue of Vanity Fair, as part of an annual roundup of the entertainment industry. The Girls were featured alongside mainstream actors, such as Daniel Day-Lewis and Julianne Moore, in a double-page photograph taken at Elton John's home on the French Riviera.

Samson was also one of several Vivid Girls who wrote material for the book How to Have a XXX Sex Life: The Ultimate Vivid Guide, published by ReganBooks on July 20, 2004. Samson helped promote the book with appearances on The O'Reilly Factor and The Howard Stern Show. In May 2004, she joined several other porn actresses and began to write as a columnist for AVNInsider.com. At the 2004 AVN Awards, Samson won "Best Actress – Film" and "Best Group Sex Scene – Film" for her role in Looking In, a 2003 film about four suburban couples who have a view into each other's houses.

Along with comedian Thea Vidale, Samson hosted the 2005 AVN Awards. She also won awards that year for "Best All-Girl Sex Scene – Film" and "Best Group Sex Scene – Film".

In February 2005, Samson began co-hosting a daily music-and-talk radio show on the Internet station Electric Eye Radio. Later in the year, she was featured alongside Jenna Jameson in Vivid's high-budget remake of the classic adult film The Devil in Miss Jones. Samson's role as Miss Jones earned her the 2006 AVN Awards for "Best Actress – Film" and "Best All-Girl Sex Scene – Film". During her acceptance speech, she expressed gratitude for this support from her peers and said "most of my family is pretty ashamed of what I do".

Samson announced in early 2006 that she had started her own production company, Savanna Samson Productions, which would release one film a year, to be distributed exclusively by Vivid. During 2006, Samson appeared on The Tyra Banks Show, The Dr. Keith Ablow Show, Secret Lives of Women, and for the second time, Saturday Night Live. Michael Lucas' 2006 gay-porn remake of La Dolce Vita featured a cameo appearance by Samson, which in 2007 won her the GayVN Award for "Best Non-Sexual Performance".

Early in 2007, Samson signed a record contract with Koch Records, now known as E1 Music, who had approached her after hearing her sing during a radio tour. On May 3, 2007, she appeared as a guest on the WNYC public radio series, The Tristan Mysteries, to discuss Richard Wagner's opera Tristan und Isolde. A long-time Wagner fan, Samson said, "I think I'm in a unique position to discuss the sensual aspects of the 'Tristan and Isolde' characters and of opera in general".

In June 2007, Savanna Samson Productions released its first title, Any Way You Want Me, an interactive movie directed by and starring Samson. She also appeared in the 2007 film Debbie Does Dallas ... Again, a sequel to the 1978 classic Debbie Does Dallas, as well as its "making of" series that was broadcast weekly on Showtime. The film gained her a 2008 AVN Award for "Best Group Sex Scene – Film".

In April 2008, Samson became a political correspondent on Fox News's late-night talk show Red Eye w/ Greg Gutfeld. She had made several previous appearances on the show, and in 2007 had endorsed New York Republican mayor Rudy Giuliani's presidential candidacy.

In September 2008 her debut album, Possession, was released, and her first single, a title track co-written by Samson during the breakup of her marriage. Commenting on the theme of the song, she said, "People see me nude and having sex and think they know me and that I'm available, but I'm no more available than Angelina Jolie". Later in the month, she had a cameo role on The Daily Show, in which she portrayed CBS Evening News anchor Katie Couric in a commercial for a fictional action-adventure show. In the appearance, Samson asks Daily Show correspondent Jason Jones, "Hey, Jones, you really think you've got the balls for that story?" She began writing a sex-advice column for the adult entertainment site XCritic.com in June 2009, having previously written such columns for Men’s Fitness magazine and AdultFriendFinder.com.

Samson made her mainstream acting debut in the 30 Rock episode, "Into the Crevasse", which first aired on October 22, 2009. In the episode, she plays a porn version of Tina Fey's character, Liz Lemon. In 2011, Samson was inducted into the AVN Hall of Fame.

According to the Internet Adult Film Database, as of May 2010 Samson had appeared in 90 adult movies, including compilations containing recycled scenes. A 2006 article in The New York Times reported that she earns from $20,000 to over $100,000 per film, depending on sales, with each one taking from three days to two weeks to make. An Adult Video News article written in February 2006 stated that Samson had five years left on her contract with Vivid.

== Winemaking ==
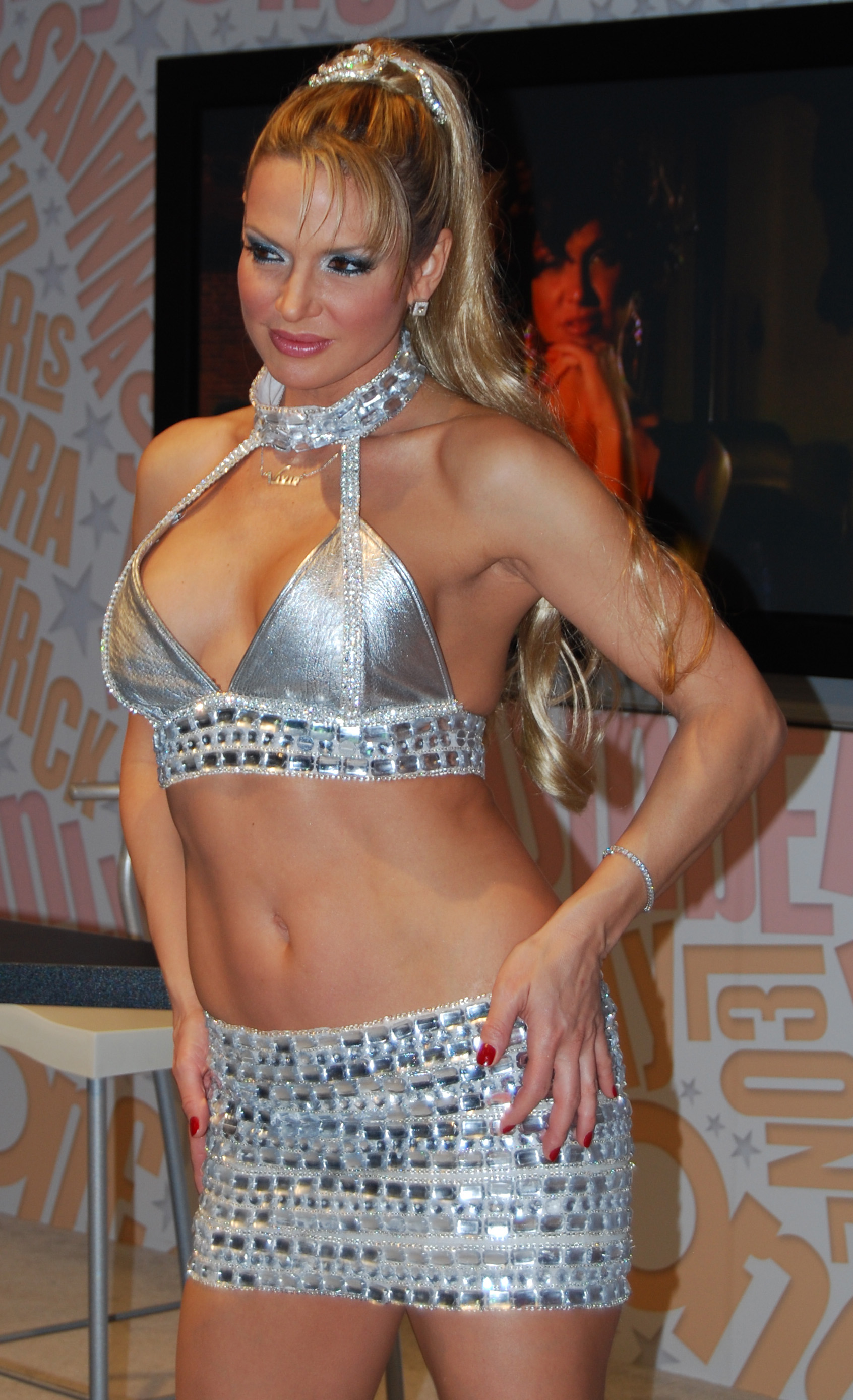
Samson at the 2008 Adult Entertainment Expo

Despite enjoying her career in the adult film industry, Samson had other ambitions. In 2005, while on vacation in Tuscany, Italy, she decided she could "leave a mark on this world" by making wine. Then married to a wine merchant, she had frequently traveled to Italy and France, and often fantasized about owning her own vineyard. When she was a child, she had helped her family make wine in the basement of their house in Watertown, New York.

She formed the company, Savanna Samson Wines, and asked Italian winemaker and consultant Roberto Cipresso to help find a blend of grapes local to Tuscany that would produce her ideal flavor. They eventually chose a mixture of 70 percent Cesanese, 20 percent Sangiovese and 10 percent Montepulciano, which produced a red wine that she named Sogno Uno, meaning 'Dream One.' Its label played on Samson's notoriety as a porn star, featuring a side view of her wearing only a see-through gown and high heels. Wine critic Robert M. Parker, Jr. gave Sogno Uno a rating of 90 to 91 out of 100, and described it as "awfully good". A gala launch was held for the wine at a Manhattan restaurant on February 27, 2006. By June 2007, her company had produced two more wines.

== Awards ==
- 2004 AVN Award - Best Actress, Film (Looking In)
- 2004 AVN Award - Best Group Sex Scene, Film (Looking In)
- 2005 AVN Award - Best All-Girl Sex Scene, Film (The Masseuse) with Jenna Jameson
- 2005 AVN Award - Best Group Sex Scene, Film (Dual Identity)
- 2005 Eroticline Award - Best Erotic Actress in the World
- 2005 NightMoves Award - Best Actress/Female Performer (Editor's Choice)
- 2006 XRCO Award - Best Single Performance, Actress (The New Devil in Miss Jones)
- 2006 AVN Award - Best Actress, Film (The New Devil in Miss Jones)
- 2006 AVN Award - Best All-Girl Sex Scene, Film (The New Devil in Miss Jones)
- 2007 GayVN Award - Best Non-Sexual Performance (Michael Lucas' La Dolce Vita)
- 2008 AVN Award - Best Group Sex Scene, Film (Debbie Does Dallas ... Again)
- 2011 AVN Hall of Fame inductee

== See also ==
- List of celebrities who own wineries and vineyards
