= 20th AVN Awards =

US adult industry award ceremony in 2003

- 2003 AVN Awards Show Program cover
- Date: January 11, 2003
- Site: The Venetian Las Vegas at Paradise, Nevada, U.S.A.
- Hosted by: Chloe; Doug Stanhope
- Preshow hosts: Nikki Fritz
- Produced by: Gary Miller
- Directed by: Mark Stone

Highlights
- Best Picture: The Fashionistas (Best Film)
- Most awards: The Fashionistas (10)
- Most nominations: The Fashionistas (22)

Television coverage
- Duration: 2 hours, 10 minutes

The 20th AVN Awards ceremony, presented by Adult Video News (AVN), took place January 11, 2003 at the Venetian Hotel Grand Ballroom, at Paradise, Nevada, U.S.A. During the ceremony, AVN presented AVN Awards in nearly 90 categories honoring the best pornographic films released between Oct. 1, 2001 and Sept. 30, 2002. The ceremony was produced by Gary Miller and directed by Mark Stone. Comedian Doug Stanhope co-hosted the show for the first time with adult film star Chloe.

The Fashionistas won 10 awards including Best Film and Best Director—Film for John Stagliano. Breathless and The Private Gladiator each took home four trophies, The Ass Collector and Perfect earned three awards apiece and several more movies won two awards each.

== Winners and nominees ==
The nominees for the 20th AVN Awards were announced in November 2002. The Fashionistas led the way with 22, followed by Paradise Lost with 16, Les Vampyres 2 with 14, Breathess with 12 and Club Sin with 11.

The winners were announced during the awards ceremony on January 11, 2003. The 10 awards won by The Fashionistas were a record for the most awards at a single show. Lexington Steele's third win as Male Performer of the Year was also a record; previously, he, Rocco Siffredi and Tom Byron had each won twice.

=== Major awards ===
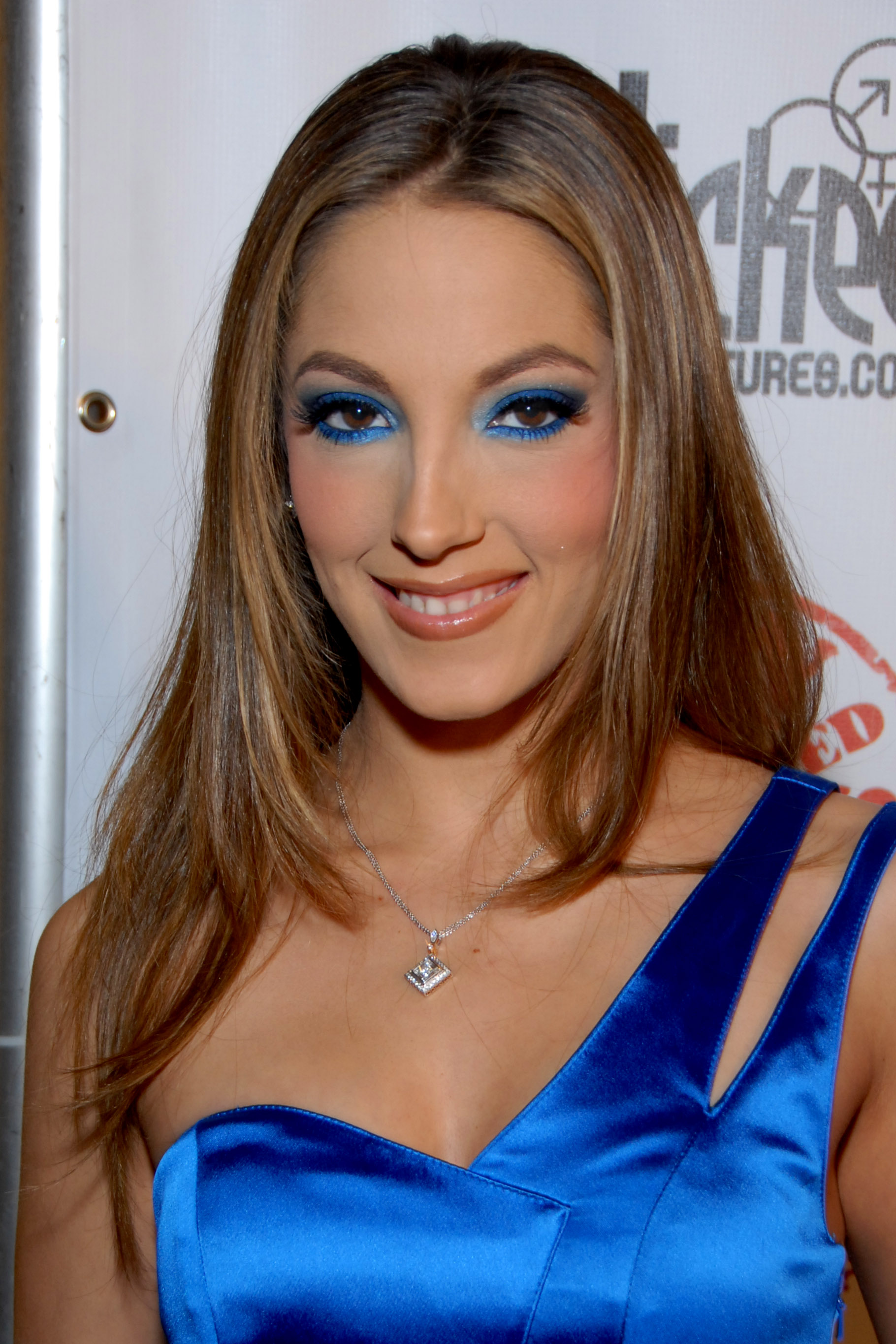
Jenna Haze, Best New Starlet winner

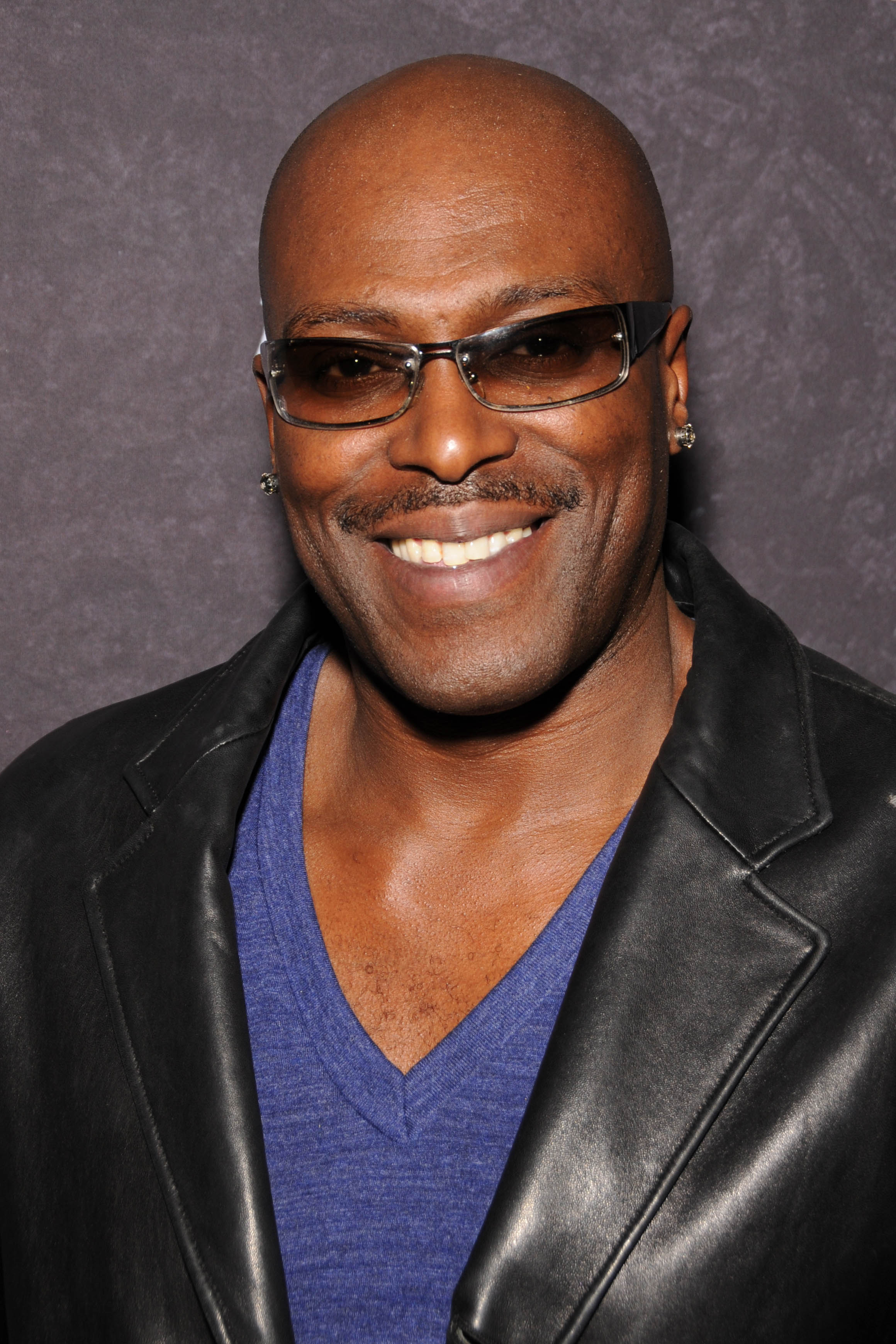
Lexington Steele, Male Performer of the Year winner

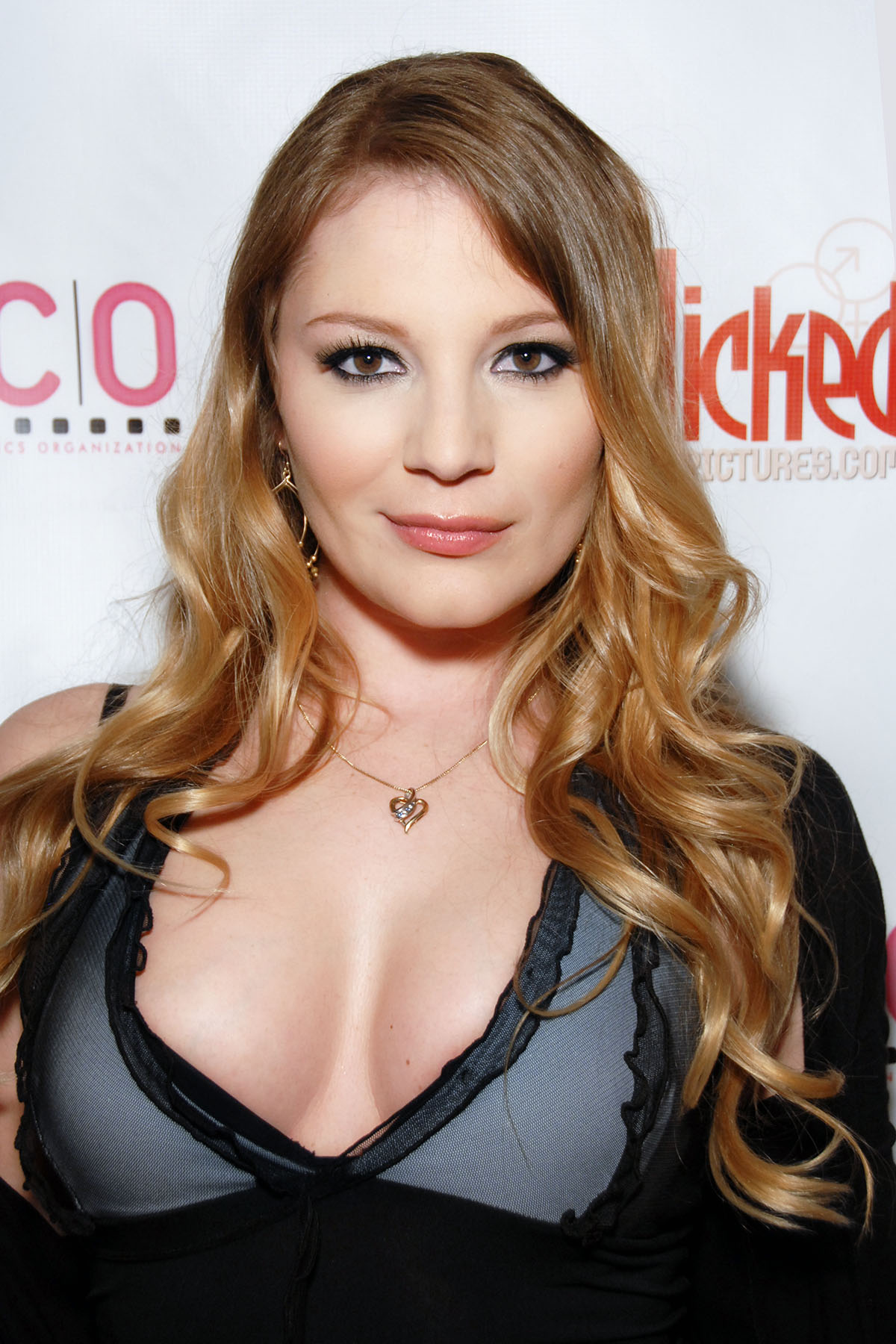
Aurora Snow, Female Performer of the Year

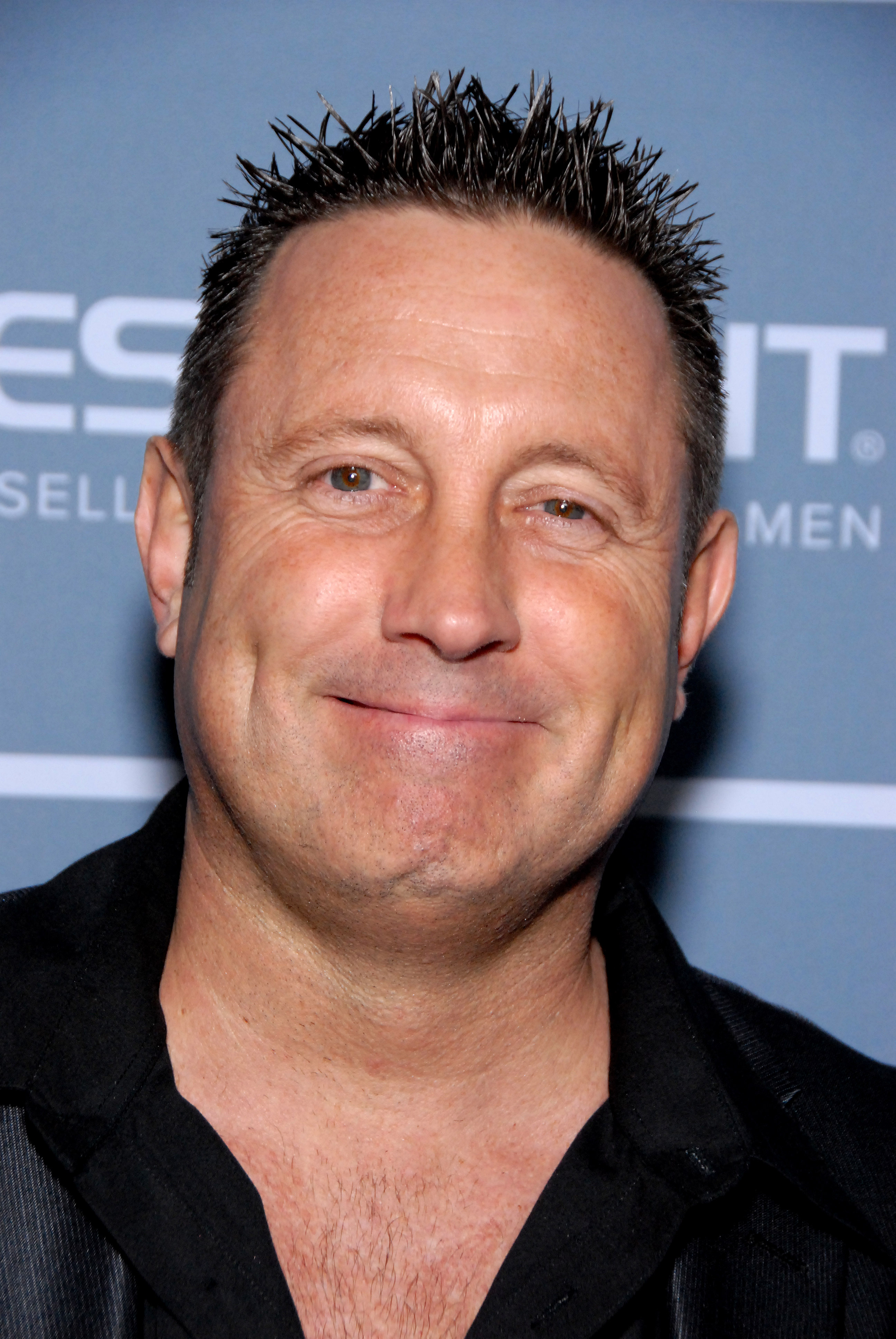
Brad Armstrong, Best Actor—Film and Best Screenplay—Film winner

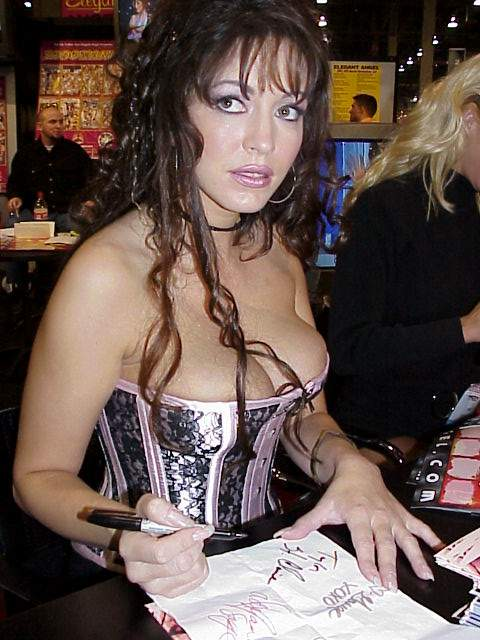
Taylor St. Claire, Best Actress—Film winner

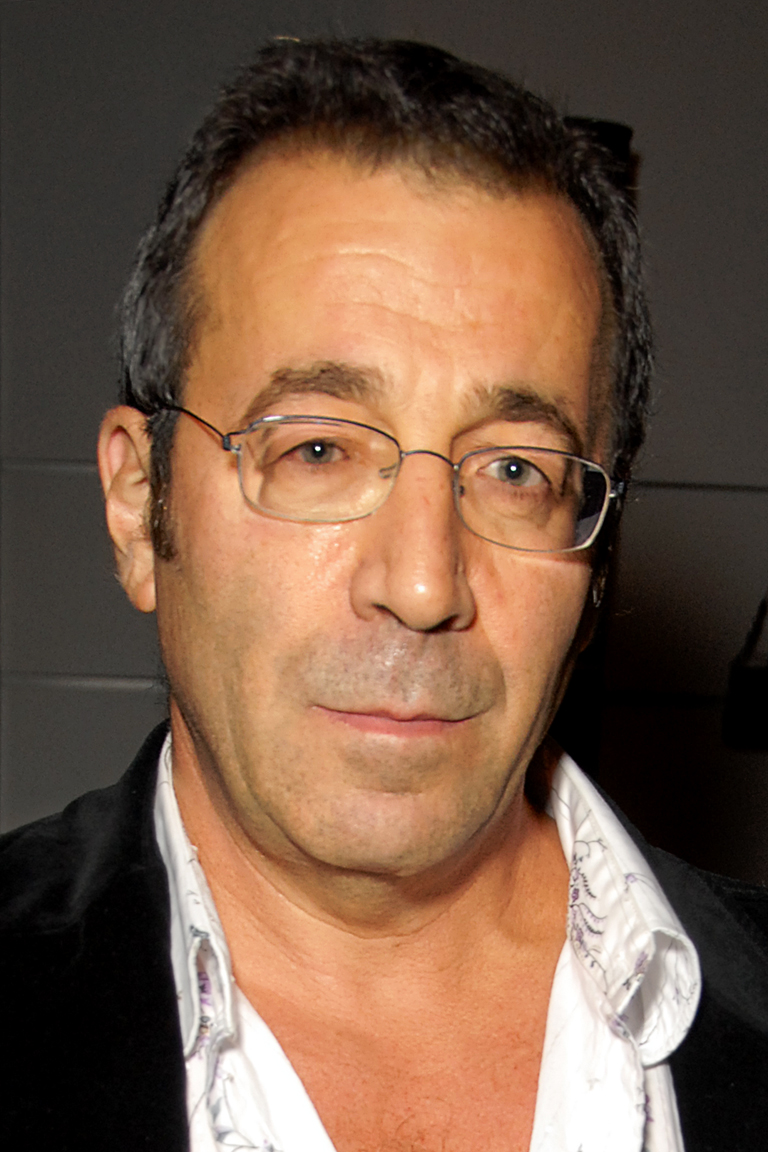
John Stagliano, Best Director—Film winner

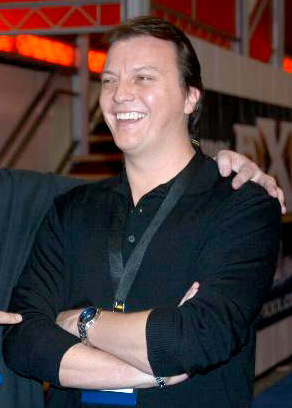
Jonathan Morgan, Best Screenplay—Film winner

Winners are listed first, highlighted in boldface, and indicated with a double dagger (‡).

Best Film	Best Video Feature
**The Fashionistas**‡; America XXX; Falling From Grace; Heartbreaker; Les Vampyres 2; Paying the Piper; Paradise Lost; Poison Angel; The Villa; Wifetaker	**The Ass Collector**‡; Betrayed By Beauty; Big Bottom Sadie; Brazilian Snake 1 & 2; Breathless; Club Sin; Colorblind; Crime and Passion; Heroin; Karma; Morning Star/Perfect Couple; Naked Eye; Perfect; Rush; Turning Point|
Best DVD	Best New Starlet
**Euphoria**‡; American Girls; The Ass Collector; Bad Wives 2; Brazilian Snake 1 & 2; Club Sin; Crime and Passion; Devon Stripped; Fade to Black; My Perfect 10s; Naked Eye; Naughty Bedtime Stories; The Private Gladiator: Collector's Limited Edition; Taboo 2001; Turning Point; The Villa	**Jenna Haze**‡; Sunrise Adams; Aria; Hannah Harper; Jewels Jade; Jassie; Kimmie Kahn; Carmen Luvana; Katie Morgan; Judy Star; Shyla Stylez; Felix Vicious; Lezley Zen
Male Performer of the Year	Female Performer of the Year
**Lexington Steele**‡; Mark Davis; Dillon; Erik Everhard; Brandon Iron; Mr. Marcus; Wesley Pipes; Steven St. Croix; Michael Stefano; Evan Stone; Lee Stone; Brian Surewood	**Aurora Snow**‡; April; Briana Banks; Belladonna; Calli Cox; Nikita Denise; Jewel De’Nyle; Jessica Drake; Devinn Lane; Jodie Moore; Obsession; Michele Raven; Olivia Saint; Nicole Sheridan; Taylor St. Claire; Sydnee Steele
Best Actor—Film	Best Actress—Film
**Brad Armstrong, Falling From Grace**‡; John Decker, Love Games; Dillon, Poison Angel; Joel Lawrence, Les Vampyres 2; Rocco Siffredi, The Fashionistas; Steven St. Croix, Paradise Lost	**Taylor St. Claire, The Fashionistas**‡; Julia Ann, Paradise Lost; Sondra Hall, Poison Angel; Taylor Hayes, If You Only Knew; Raylene, Love Games; Sydnee Steele, Falling From Grace; Nici Sterling, Wifetaker; Syren, Les Vampyres 2
Best Actor—Video	Best Actress—Video
**Dale DaBone, Betrayed By Beauty**‡; Brad Armstrong, Heroin; Steve Austin, Pleasureville 2: Shagnet; Baz, The Ozporns; Steve Holmes, Funky Fetish Horror Show; Julian, Naked Eye; Kris Knight, The Ass Collector; Joel Lawrence, Karma; Toni Ribas, The Private Gladiator; Randy Spears, Sex World 2002; Steven St. Croix, Colorblind; Evan Stone, Breathless	**Devinn Lane, Breathless**‡; Aria, Naked Eye; Kate Frost, Virgin Canvas; Ashlyn Gere, Crime and Passion; Hannah Harper, Role Models 2; Kylie Ireland, One Sleepless Night, Wicked Pictures; Julie Meadows, Sex World 2002; Alexa Rae, Karma; Raylene, Betrayed By Beauty; Sydnee Steele, Heroin; Gwen Summers, Double Vision; Ava Vincent, Heartbreaker
Best Director—Film	Best Director—Video
**John Stagliano, The Fashionistas**‡; Brad Armstrong, Falling From Grace; James Avalon, Les Vampyres 2; Andrew Blake, The Villa; Kris Kramski, America XXX; Michael Raven, Paradise Lost; Paul Thomas, Wifetaker	**Michael Raven, Breathless**‡; **Rocco Siffredi, The Ass Collector**‡ (tie); Nic Andrews, Rush; Patrick Collins, Big Bottom Sadie; Nic Cramer, Naked Eye; Red Ezra, Hearts & Minds; Veronica Hart, Crime and Passion; Cash Markman, Pleasureville 2: Shagnet; Jonathan Morgan, Turning Point; Michael Ninn, Perfect; Antonio Passolini, Club Sin; Simon Poe, La Casa de Mistress Isabella; Mike Quasar, Karma; Bobby Rinaldi, All Soaped Up; David Stanley, Morning Star/Perfect Couple; Pierre Woodman, Brazilian Snake 1 & 2
Best Supporting Actress—Video	Best Foreign Feature
**Sydnee Steele, Breathless**‡; April, Something So Right; Violet Blue, Karma; Asia Carrera, My Father's Wife; Nikita Denise, I Dream of Jenna; Wendy Divine, Jolean and the Pussycats; Haven, Out of Control 2; Brooke Hunter, Sinful Rella; Devinn Lane, Turning Point; Aurora Snow, In & Out of Beverly Hills	**The Private Gladiator**‡; Exxxplosion!!!; Faust: The Power of Sex; Funky Fetish Horror Show; Hot Frequency; Leg Love; The Necklace; Restitution
Best Ethnic-Themed Video	Best Gonzo Tape
**Liquid City**‡; Baby Girl 2; Black & Wild 3; Chica Boom 10; Chillin' Wit Da Mack 4; D.P.G.s—Double Penetration Girls; Freakazoids 2; Little White Chicks, Big Black Monster Dicks 15; My Baby Got Back 28; My Thick Black Ass 5; Premium Black Pussy Search 6; Pretty Little Latinas 5; Still Up in This XXX; Women of Color 3	**Shane's World 29**‡; Balls Deep 5; Ben Dover's Royal Reamers 2; Buttman's Anal Show 3; Cum Drippers 1; Francesca Lé's Flesh Fest; High Society's Purely 18: Surfer Girls; Iron Maidens; Jules Jordan: Flesh Hunter; Lex the Impaler 2; Midnight Angels 2; Runaway Butts 5; Service Animals 6; The Voyeur 20
Top Selling Tape	Top Renting Tape
**Briana Loves Jenna**‡	**Briana Loves Jenna**‡
Best Couples Sex Scene—Film	Best Group Sex Scene—Film
**Nikita Denise, Joel Lawrence, Les Vampyres 2**‡; Caroline Pierce, Manuel Ferrara, The Fashionistas; Taylor St. Claire, Rocco Siffredi, The Fashionistas; Adajja, Tony Tedeschi, Love Games; Julia Ann, Steven St. Croix, Paradise Lost	**Friday, Taylor St. Claire, Sharon Wild, Rocco Siffredi, The Fashionistas**‡; Jessica Drake, Nicole Sheridan, Voodoo, Falling From Grace; Syren, Ava Vincent, Joel Lawrence, Les Vampyres 2; April, Olivia Del Rio, Mr. Marcus, Paradise Lost; Dasha, Sharon Wild, Dillon, Take 5; Dasha, Danny, Dillon, Pat Myne, Vision; Briana Banks, Chandler, Michele Raven, Cheyne Collins, Dale DaBone, Pat Myne, Vision; Daniella Rush, Victoria Styles, Steve Drake, Women of the World
Best Couples Sex Scene—Video	Best Oral Sex Scene—Video
**Alexa Rae, Lexington Steele, Lex the Impaler 2**‡; Amber Michaels, Frank Fortuna, Ass Worship 2; Sydnee Steele, Steven St. Croix, Breathless; Michael Stefano, Jewel De'Nyle, Buttfaced!; Chloe, Pat Myne, Club Sin; Ashlyn Gere, Nick Manning, Crime and Passion; Jade-Blue Eclipse, Brian Surewood, Kung-Fu Girls	**Flick Shagwell, Gino Greco, Lady Fellatio in the Doghouse**‡; Jana, Nacho Vidal, Blowjob Impossible 4; Aurora Snow, Jay Ashley, Mark Ashley, Jules Jordan, Brett Rockman, Arnold Schwartzenpecker, Feeding Frenzy; Alexandra Quinn, Rafe, Johnny Thrust, Gag Factor 9; Jewel De'Nyle, Steven St. Croix, I Dream of Jenna; Mason, Olivia Saint, Gino Greco, Kyle Stone, Lady Fellatio 2: Desperately Seeking Semen; Sydnee Steele, Brad Armstrong, My Father's Wife; Brie Brooks, Dante, Shut Up and Blow Me 30; Amber Ways, Mark Ashley, Darren James, Tony Michaels, Throat Gaggers
Best Anal Sex Scene—Video	Best All-Girl Sex Scene—Video
**Jewel De'Nyle, Lexington Steele, Babes in Pornland: Interracial Babes**‡; Jade Marcella, Erik Everhard, Jules Jordan, Ass Worship; Lea DeMae, Michael Stefano, Buttfaced! 3; Sandra, Steve Holmes, David Perry, Franco Roccaforte, Titus, Debauchery 12; Monique, Byron Long, Wesley Pipes, DPGs—Double Penetration Girls; Brie Brooks, Mandingo, Wesley Pipes, Fresh Meat 13; Kianna Dior, Zana, Erik Everhard, Hot Bods and Tail Pipe 21; Nikki Reed, George, Legal Skin 4; Summer Storm, Tyce Bune, Mason's Dirty Trixxx; Jasmine Klein, Mickey G, Perverted Stories 33; Aurora Snow, Jay Ashley, Erik Everhard, Pat Myne, Space Invaderz; Belladonna, Lexington Steele, Up Your Ass 19; Brandy Starz, Dave Hardman, Pat Myne, White Trash Whore 24; Jewels Jade, Dillon, Wildlife Anal Contest 2002; Alexandra Quinn, Lee Stone, Where the Fuck's The G Spot?	**Autumn, Nikita Denise, Jenna Jameson, I Dream of Jenna**‡; Wanda Curtis, Devinn Lane, After Hours; Jewel De'Nyle, Zana, Babes In Pornland: Busty Babes; April, Devinn Lane, Breathless; Briana Banks, Jenna Jameson, Briana Loves Jenna; Sindee Coxx, Kaylynn, Justine Romee, Buttslammers 21; Ashlyn Gere, Gwen Summers, Club Sin; Jenna Haze, Inari Vachs, Dripping Wet Sex; Mandy Bright, Jazmin, Sophie Evans, Mia Stone, Faust: The Power of Sex; Jewel De'Nyle, Francesca Lé, Francesca Lé's Flesh Fest; Sky, Krystal Steal, Four Finger Club 21; Asia Carrera, Sydnee Steele, My Father's Wife; Chandler, T. J. Hart, Brooke Hunter, Kitty Marie, No Man's Land 35; Alexis Amore, Friday, Still Up in This XXX; Kristina Black, Daisy Chain, Lola, Misty, Shelbee Myne, Aurora Snow, Gwen Summers, The Violation of Aurora Snow

=== Additional Award Winners ===
These awards were announced, but not presented, in a pre-recorded winners-only segment shown on the ballroom's video monitors during the event. Trophies were given to the recipients off-stage:

- Adult Video Nudes Award: The Amazing Norma Stitz
- Best All-Girl Feature: The Violation of Aurora Snow
- Best All-Girl Series: The Violation Of...
- Best All-Girl Sex Scene—Film: Belladonna, Taylor St. Claire, The Fashionistas
- Best All-Sex DVD: Breakin' 'Em In 2
- Best All-Sex Video: Bring 'Um Young 9
- Best Alternative Video: DreamGirls: Real Adventures 37
- Best Anal Sex Scene—Film: Kate Frost, Rocco Siffredi, The Fashionistas
- Best Anal-Themed Feature: Buttfaced! 3
- Best Anal-Themed Series: Ass Worship
- Best Art Direction—Film: Kris Kramski, America XXX
- Best Art Direction—Video: David Lockard, Hearts & Minds
- Best Box Cover Concept: Autumn Haze vs. Son of Dong
- Best Cinematography: Andrew Blake, The Villa
- Best Classic Release on DVD: Pretty Peaches 2
- Best Continuing Video Series: Naked Hollywood
- Best Director—Foreign Release: Antonio Adamo, The Private Gladiator
- Best Director—Non-Feature: Jim Powers, Perverted Stories 35
- Best DVD Authoring: Wicked Pictures DVD
- Best DVD Extras: Euphoria, Wicked Pictures DVD
- Best DVD Menus: The Private Gladiator: Collector's Limited Edition
- Best DVD Packaging: The Private Gladiator: Collector's Limited Edition, Private Media
- Best Editing—Film: Tricia Devereaux, John Stagliano, The Fashionistas
- Best Editing—Video: Ethan Kane, Perfect
- Best Ethnic-Themed Series: Chica Boom
- Best Foreign Vignette Series: Euro Angels Hardball
- Best Foreign Vignette Tape: Hustler XXX 11
- Best Gonzo Series: The Voyeur
- Best Group Sex Scene—Video: Angel Long, Jay Ashley, Pat Myne, Assficianado
- Best Interactive DVD: Virtual Sex With Janine
- Best Male Newcomer: Nick Manning
- Best Music: Various Artists, America XXX
- Best Non-Sex Performance—Film or Video: Tina Tyler, The Ozporns, VCA Pictures
- Best Oral Sex Scene—Film: Belladonna, Rocco Siffredi, The Fashionistas
- Best Oral-Themed Feature: Throat Gaggers
- Best Oral-Themed Series: Gag Factor
- Best Overall Marketing Campaign—Company Image: Digital Playground, Wicked Pictures (tie)
- Best Overall Marketing Campaign—Individual Title or Series: Paradise Lost, Sin City Films
- Best Packaging: Hearts & Minds, New Sensations
- Best Pro-Am or Amateur Series: The Real Naturals
- Best Pro-Am or Amateur Tape: NYC Underground: Times Square Trash Vol. 2
- Best Screenplay—Film: Daniel Metcalf, Brad Armstrong, Jonathan Morgan, Falling From Grace
- Best Screenplay—Video: Michael Raven, Devan Sapphire, Breathless
- Best Sex Comedy: Kung-Fu Girls
- Best Sex Scene in a Foreign-Shot Production: Veronica B., Cindy, Henrietta, Karib, Katalin, Monik, Nikita, Niky, Sheila Scott, Petra Short, Stella Virgin, Rocco Siffredi, The Ass Collector
- Best Solo Sex Scene: Jenna Haze, Big Bottom Sadie
- Best Special Effects: Ninnwerx, Perfect
- Best Specialty Tape—Big Bust: Heavy Handfuls
- Best Specialty Tape—BDSM: Ivy Manor 5
- Best Specialty Tape—Foot Fetish: Barefoot Confidential 15
- Best Specialty Tape—Other Genre: Internal Affairs 5
- Best Specialty Tape—Spanking: Stocking Strippers Spanked 2
- Best Supporting Actor—Film: Mr. Marcus, Paradise Lost
- Best Supporting Actor—Video: Randy Spears, Hercules
- Best Supporting Actress—Film: Belladonna, The Fashionistas
- Best Tease Performance: Belladonna, The Fashionistas
- Best Transsexual Tape: Rogue Adventures 16
- **Best Videography: Perfect,** Michael Ninn
- Best Vignette Tape: Mason's Dirty Trixxx
- Best Vignette Series: Barely Legal
- Female Foreign Performer of the Year: Rita Faltoyano
- Male Foreign Performer of the Year: Rocco Siffredi
- Most Outrageous Sex Scene: "Autumn Haze's Big Dick", Autumn Haze vs. Son of Dong

=== Honorary AVN Awards ===
==== Reuben Sturman Award ====
- Mel Kamins, General Video Cleveland

==== Special DVD Recognition Award ====
- Wadd: The Life and Times of John C. Holmes, Cass Paley, VCA Interactive

==== Hall of Fame ====
AVN Hall of Fame inductees for 2003 were: T. T. Boy, Mark Davis, Felecia, Dave Hardman, Heather Hunter, Jill Kelly, Chasey Lain, Madison, Jonathan Morgan, Alex Sanders, Julian St. Jox, Kirdy Stevens, Tony Tedeschi, Teri Weigel

=== Multiple nominations and awards ===
The following releases received the most nominations.

Nominations	Movie
22	The Fashionistas
16	Paradise Lost
14	Les Vampyres 2
12	Breathless
11	Club Sin
10	Falling From Grace
10	The Private Gladiator
9	America XXX
9	Heartbreaker
9	Karma
9	Turning Point

The following 13 releases received multiple awards:

Awards	Movie
10	The Fashionistas
4	Breathless
4	The Private Gladiator
3	The Ass Collector
3	Perfect
2	America XXX
2	Autumn Haze vs. Son of Dong
2	Briana Loves Jenna
2	Euphoria
2	Falling From Grace
2	Hearts and Minds
2	Paradise Lost
2	The Violation of Aurora Snow

== Presenters and performers ==
The following individuals, listed in order of appearance, presented awards or performed musical numbers or comedy. The show's trophy girls were Taylor Starr and Tyler Starr, the Sin City Twins.

=== Presenters (in order of appearance) ===
Name(s)	Role
Misty Rain; Jessica Drake	Presenters of the awards for Best Supporting Actress—Video and Best Couples Sex Scene—Video
Ron Jeremy; Hannah Harper; Sunrise Adams	Presenters of the award for Best Oral Sex Scene—Video and Best Ethnic-Themed Video
	Presenters of the awards for Best Group Sex Scene—Film and Best Foreign Feature
Larry Flynt	Presenter of the Reuben Sturman Special Achievement Award
Sunset Thomas; Paul Fishbein	Presenters of the awards for Top Selling Tape and Top Renting Tape
Lexington Steele; Stormy; Gina Lynn	Presenters of the award for Best All-Girl Sex Scene—Video
Teri Weigel; Inari Vachs; Brittany Andrews	Presenters of the awards for Best Anal Sex Scene—Video and Best Gonzo Tape
Chi Chi LaRue; Jenna Jameson	Presenters of the awards for Male Performer of the Year and Female Performer of the Year
Steven St. Croix; Julia Ann	Presenters of the awards for Best Director—Film and Best Director—Video
Sean Michaels; Devon; April	Presenters of the awards for Best DVD and Best Couples Sex Scene in a Film
Violet Blue	Presenter of the award for Best New Starlet
Vince Neil; Felicia; Savanna Samson	Presenters of the awards for Best Actor—Video and Best Actress—Video
Seymore Butts; Carmen Luvana; Shyla Stylez	Presenters of the awards for Best Actor—Film and Best Actress—Film
	Presenters of the award for Best Video Feature
Ed Powers; Houston	Presenters of the award for Best Film

=== Performers ===
Name(s)	Role	Performed
Mark Stone and the AVN Orchestra	Musical Director	Orchestral accompaniment
Spearmint Rhino Dancers	Performers	Dancers on stage
Vince Neil	Performer	Musical number, “Girls, Girls, Girls”
Doug Stanhope	Performer	Standup comedy segment
Randy Spears; Steven St. Croix; Dale DaBone; Mark Kernes; Stormy; Brad Armstrong; Aria; Ron Vogel and others	Performers	"What's the Best Way to Win an AVN Award?" comedy short video
Crazy Town	Performers	Musical numbers, "Butterfly" and "Hurt You So Bad"

== Ceremony information ==
AVN created several new categories for the year's awards show. Among them: Best Oral Sex Scene—Video, Best Male Newcomer, Best Director—Non-Feature, Male Foreign Performer of the Year and Female Foreign Performer of the Year.

The show was recorded for later broadcast and a DVD of the awards show was issued by VCA Pictures.

=== Performance of year's movies ===
Briana Loves Jenna was announced as the adult movie industry's top selling movie and also the top renting movie of the previous year.

== See also ==
- AVN Award
- AVN Best New Starlet Award
- AVN Award for Male Performer of the Year
- AVN Award for Male Foreign Performer of the Year
- AVN Female Performer of the Year Award
- List of members of the AVN Hall of Fame
- 2003 GayVN Awards
