= Playboy TV Double Features =

- Country of origin: United States

Production
- Running time: 120 mins

Original release
- Network: Playboy TV

Playboy TV Double Features are a nightly block of two back-to-back adult movies that air on Playboy TV.

== Overview ==
Originally labeled as Late Night Movies, Double Features have been a constant presence on the Playboy TV schedule since the network's inception. The concept was to make the adult industry's current popular and buzzworthy films available to subscribers on a nightly basis.

Most of the adult films featured have been edited in some way to eliminate some of the more hardcore moments (anal penetration, ejaculations). Premieres are shown once a week and are oftentimes geared around themes (MILFs, AVN Award Winners, etc.).

Many of the titles tend to be high-profile, bigger budgeted adult films from studios like Vivid and Jenna Jameson's ClubJenna, although independent and amateur-related films have also been shown.
