= Briana Loves Jenna =

2001 film by Jay Grdina

- Cover
- Directed by: Justin Sterling
- Written by: Helmet Newton
- Produced by: Jenna Jameson; Justin Sterling: ClubJenna.com Productions
- Starring: Jenna Jameson; Briana Banks; Erik Everhard; Isabella; Shay Sweet
- Cinematography: Justin Sterling
- Edited by: Justin Sterling; Billy Ehrens
- Music by: Aaron Hungwell
- Distributed by: Vivid Entertainment
- Release date: November 27, 2001
- Country: United States
- Language: English

Briana Loves Jenna is a 2001 pornographic film starring Briana Banks and Jenna Jameson, written and directed by Jay Grdina under the stage name "Justin Sterling".

== History ==
It was the first film produced by Club Jenna, and was successful, winning twin AVN Awards for best selling and best renting pornographic title of 2002. It cost US$280,000 to make and grossed over $1 million in its first year. It marked Jameson's return to pornography after a hiatus of several years, and was advertised on the boxcover as "Jenna. Her first boy/girl scene in over 2 years."

This was the first film made by Jameson after her marriage to Grdina, and she had previously told him that she would do female/female scenes only in the future. However, realizing the film would be a success only if there were female/male scenes, she said the only male she would film a female/male scene with would be Grdina, which he agreed to.

== Awards and nominations ==
Year	Ceremony	Result	Category	Recipient(s)
2003	AFW Award	Won	Best All-Girl Sex Scene - Video	Briana Banks & Jenna Jameson
2003	AVN Award	Nominated	Best All-Girl Sex Scene – Video	Briana Banks & Jenna Jameson
2003	AVN Award	Won	Top Renting Tape of 2002	—N/a
2003	AVN Award	Won	Top Selling Tape of 2002	—N/a
2003	XRCO Award	Nominated	Best Girl/Girl Sex Scene	Briana Banks & Jenna Jameson
