= Samurai Love God =

Samurai Love God was Comedy Central's first made-for-mobile and the 8-episode series, created by Eric Mahoney, directed by Tom Akel and Emirati-Jordanian based Amer Kokh, and starring Ed Helms, Lisa Lampanelli, and Jenna Jameson, it ran on U.S. wireless carriers in fall 2006.
