= Red Ezra =

American film director

David Lockard, aka Red Ezra, is an American Director, Producer, Editor, writer and Photographer. He has directed over 30 adult videos since 2000, for companies such as Vivid Entertainment, Wicked Pictures, Metro and New Sensations. He runs the film production company, Red Ezra, and the post-production company, Hacksaw Post. Lockard initially entered the adult industry as an Editor, working under the name Hacksaw. He has also written scripts for several videos under the name Joe Ezrahaus. Lockard has directed several mainstream long form music videos, such as "Dimevision Vol. One" and "Pantera Home Video Part 3", which both reached No. 1 on the Billboard video sales chart.

== Awards ==
- 2000 AVN Award nominee – Best Videography – Serenity In Denim
- 2001 AVN Award nominee – Best Editing Video – In Style
- 2002 AVN Award nominee – Best Vignette Tape – Fast Cars & Tiki Bars
- 2002 AVN Award nominee – Best All-Sex Video – Love Shack
- 2002 AVN Award nominee – Best Director - Video – Fast Cars & Tiki Bars
- 2002 AVN Award nominee – Best Editing - Video – Fast Cars & Tiki Bars
- 2002 AVN Award nominee – Best Director - Video – Love Shack
- 2002 AVN Award nominee – Best Art Direction - Video – Fast Cars & Tiki Bars
- 2002 AVN Award nominee – Best All-Girl Feature – Flash!
- 2003 AVN Award nominee – Best Director, Video – Hearts & Minds
- 2003 AVN Award nominee – Best Vignette Tape – Hearts & Minds
- 2003 AVN Award WINNER – Best Art Direction, Video – Hearts & Minds
- 2003 AVN Award nominee – Best Art Direction, Video – Sweetwater
- 2003 AVN Award nominee – Best Videography – Roadblock
- 2003 AVN Award nominee – Best Special Effects – Riders
- 2004 AVN Award nominee – Best Art Direction, Video – Angel X
- 2004 AVN Award nominee – Best All-Girl Feature – Pussy Sweat
- 2005 AVN Award nominee – Best Video Feature – The Getaway
- 2006 AVN Award nominee – Best Video Feature – Drive
- 2006 AVN Award nominee – Best Director, Video – Taboo 21
- 2006 AVN Award nominee – Best Screenplay, Video – Drive
- 2006 AVN Award nominee – Best Videography – Blu Dreams: Sweet Solos
- 2006 AVN Award WINNER – Best Solo Video – Blu Dreams: Sweet Solos
- 2007 AVN Award nominee – Best Director, Non-Feature – McKenzie Made
- 2007 AVN Award nominee – Best All-Sex Release – McKenzie Made
- 2007 AVN Award nominee – Best Art Direction - Video – McKenzie Made
- 2007 AVN Award nominee – Best Videography – The Visitors
- 2009 AVN Award nominee – Best Editing - Video – Succubus of the Rouge
- 2009 AVN Award nominee – Best Special Effects – Succubus of the Rouge
