= Wesley Pipes =

American pornographic actor

- Born: Wesley Lawrence; January 20, 1969 (age 57); Mississippi, United States
- Other names: Cousin Wesley, Jesse Outlaw, Jonathan, W. Pipes, Wesely Pipes, Wesley P. Ghettochild, Wesley Pipe, Westley Pipes
- Height: 6 ft 2 in (1.88 m)

Wesley Lawrence (born January 20, 1969), better known by his stage name Wesley Pipes, is a retired American pornographic actor.

== Career ==
Pipes entered the adult film industry in 1998. His stage name is a reference to actor Wesley Snipes. In 2009, he was inducted into the Urban X Awards Hall of Fame. He was also inducted into the AVN Awards Hall of Fame in 2015. In January 2015, director Alexander Devoe announced that Pipes had inoperable lung cancer and was undergoing intense treatment. In May 2020, Pipes announced, on his Instagram account, that his cancer had been in remission as of January 6, 2020.

After his treatment, which was certified successful and with his cancer now in remission, Wes took time to reflect and get back into reckoning, this time with Comedy.

Building on this premise, Wesley released a 14 Tracker album titled "Still Mr. Ssissippi" a tribute to random comedy and his hood. The Album was produced by TeJohn Anax and SAV DID IT (who is known to produce tracks for rappers.)

== Awards and nominations ==
AVN Awards
Year	Result	Award	Film
2003	Nominated	Male Performer of the Year	—N/a
2003	Nominated	Best Anal Sex Scene - Video (with Monique & Byron Long)	DPGs
2003	Nominated	Best Anal Sex Scene - Video (with Brie Brooks & Mandingo)	Fresh Meat 13
2004	Nominated	Best Group Sex Scene – Video (with Melanie Jagger, Billy Banks, Sledge Hammer, Byron Long & Julian St. Jox)	White Trash Whore 27
2013	Nominated	Best Double Penetration Sex Scene (with Ashli Orion & Nat Turnher)	Big Ass Anal Wreckage
2014	Nominated	Best Group Sex Scene (with Chanel Preston, Danny Wylde, Drehyden, Evan Stone, Ike Diesel, John Strong & Mark Davis)	The Devil’s Gang Bang: Lisa Ann vs. Chanel Preston
2014	Nominated	Unsung Male Performer of the Year	—N/a
2015	Won	AVN Hall of Fame	—N/a
2015	Nominated	Best Double Penetration Sex Scene (with Veronica Avluv & Rico Strong)	Freaky MILFs
2015	Nominated	Best Group Sex Scene (with Veruca James, Lisa Ann, Jason Brown, Jon Jon, Nat Turnher & Mark Anthony)	Lisa Ann's Black Out 2

Urban X Awards
Year	Result	Award	Film
2009	Won	Hall of Fame	—N/a
2010	Nominated	Best Anal Sex Scene (with Stacey Lane)	Black Ass Addiction 5
2010	Nominated	Best Anal Sex Scene (with Velicity Von)	Phat Ass White Booty 5
2010	Nominated	Best Couple Sex Scene (with Melody Nakai)	Pop Dat Phat Azz 4
2011	Nominated	Best Couple Sex Scene (with Stacie Lane)	Big Ass Cheaters 4

XBIZ Awards
Year	Result	Award	Film
2016	Won	Best Sex Scene — All-Sex Release (with Jada Stevens)	Interracial and Anal
