= Jay Grdina =

American pornographic actor

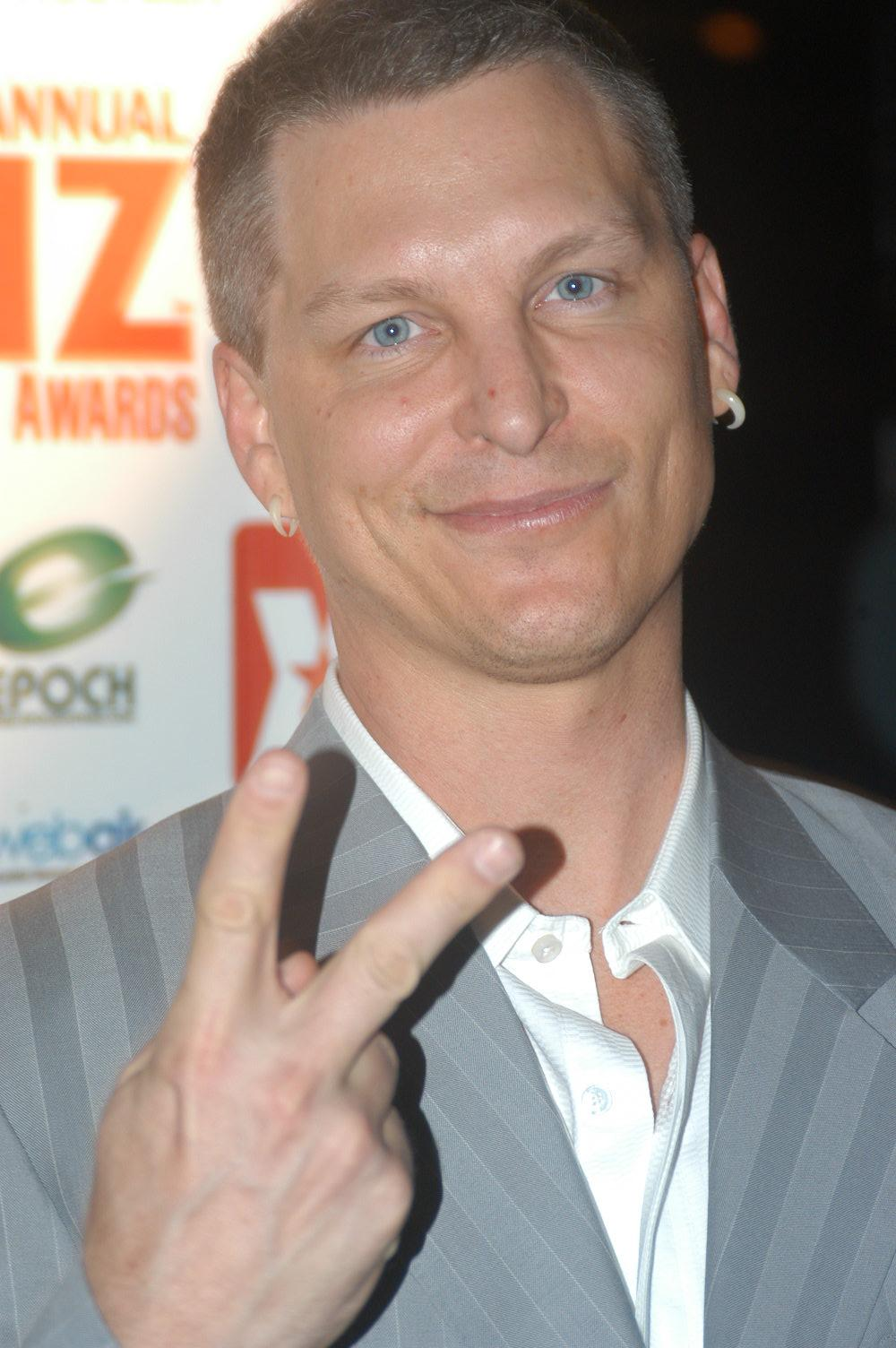
- Grdina in 2005
- Born: October 11, 1967 (age 59); Wooster, Ohio, U.S.
- Other name: Justin Sterling
- Occupations: Businessman; pornographic actor
- Spouse: Jenna Jameson (m. 2003; div. 2006)

John G. "Jay" Grdina (born October 11, 1967) is an American businessman and former pornographic actor. He is often credited under the stage name Justin Sterling.

== Early life ==
Grdina was born in Ohio to a wealthy cattle ranching family who immigrated from Karlovac, Croatia. He spent portions of his grade school years at Naples Christian Academy (NCH) in Naples, Florida, and his high school years at Gilmour Academy, a prep school in Gates Mills, Ohio. He attended the University of San Diego majoring in business and psychology.

== Career ==
After graduating college, Grdina pursued a variety of careers and business ventures until 1992, when he began investing in adult films directed by Michael Ninn. From 1995 to 1999, he wrote and directed several pornographic films in Ninn's style, often under the name Michael Santangelo, Justin Fine and Justin Sterling.

Grdina met Jenna Jameson, already a famous porn star, in 1998. They married in a Roman Catholic-style ceremony on June 22, 2003. The couple resided in Scottsdale, Arizona, in a 6,700-square-foot (620 m^{2}) Spanish-style mansion purchased for $2 million in 2002. They later moved to Paradise Valley in a 10,000 sq ft (930 m^{2}) home for $4.5 million.

In 2000, Grdina co-founded ClubJenna, first as an Internet pornography company then as a multimedia adult entertainment business. On June 22, 2006, Playboy Enterprises announced the acquisition of Club Jenna and related companies in conjunction with personal service agreements by both Jameson and Grdina.

Grdina produced, directed, and wrote several Club Jenna films including Briana Loves Jenna, The Masseuse, I Dream of Jenna, and Krystal Method. Grdina also acted in some of these films, as the only man that Jameson would have intercourse with on screen.

In 2006, Grdina was a judge in the second season of Playboy TV's Jenna's American Sex Star, where prospective porn stars compete in sexual performances for a contract with Club Jenna.

In June 2010, Grdina started the celebrity gossip website, Kikster.com. As of May 2013, there is no Kikster.com.

In December 2010, Grdina was named CEO of NOHO, a hangover prevention beverage.

On June 20, 2011, NOHO and Grdina were the subject of a feature for CNBC, detailing the creation of an emerging brand.

== Personal life ==
Grdina married Jenna Jameson in June 2003. Jameson filed for divorce in December 2006.

Grdina lives in Paradise Valley, Arizona.

== Awards ==
- 1998 AVN Award – Best Videography – Diva, The Series (shared with Barry Harley)
- 2004 NightMoves Award – Best Director (Fan's Choice)
- 2005 AFW Award – Best Actor – The Masseuse
- 2005 AVN Award – Best Actor (Film) – The Masseuse
- 2005 AVN Award – Best Couples Sex Scene (Film) – The Masseuse (shared with Jenna Jameson)
- 2005 AVN Award – Best Editing (Video) – Bella Loves Jenna
- 2007 AVN Award – Best Editing (Film) – Jenna's Provocateur (shared with Johnny 5)
