= The Private Gladiator =

2001 film by Antonio Adamo

Private Gladiator: In the City of Lust, DVD cover

The Private Gladiator is a pornographic trilogy (Private Gladiator, Private Gladiator: In the City of Lust and Private Gladiator: Sexual Conquest, length 115 minutes), directed by Antonio Adamo and produced by Private Media Group. It is one of the most expensive in the world of its genre. Also, unlike most adult films based on mainstream films, it is not a parody, but rather a straightforward remake of Ridley Scott's 2000 film Gladiator. The Private Gladiator trilogy was produced on November 28, 2001, total length - 351 minutes. It won the 2003 AVN award for Best Foreign Feature.

== Storyline ==
The film is set in 180 AD, and focuses on a Roman general who is on his way to becoming Emperor, also known as Caesar. A jealous man in power decides to usurp the general's destiny and sets in motion a power play to become leader himself. By stripping the general (Toni Ribas) of all his rank and power, then sending him to become a slave who must fight in the arena to entertain the citizens, the thought is that the general will die an early death and never bother him again. Needless to say, the general survives, and thrives, which makes him become a threat to those who stole his position.

=== In the City of Lust ===
General Maximus, after becoming a slave, returns to Rome to take revenge on Commodus. But in order to do so, he must first become a gladiator, win glory in the arena, make himself loved by the public, and become a myth. When he arrives in the city, he meets Domitila, Caesar's cousin, and an old love of his. Upon seeing him again, she gives free rein to her passion, but then must do battle with Siria, the slave-girl who is with Maximus.

After the fields of battle, Maximus must fight again in the arena at the Colosseum, against gladiators and savage beasts. This second thrilling episode of the saga is also a faithful reconstruction of the amatory arts of Roman women, whether they were patricians with an itch to scratch, or unbridled plebeian women given to sodomy and gangbangs. The orgies in the lupanars and the parties held by Commodus and his henchmen bring to life a series of highly erotic and shocking sex scenes, with disturbing and sinful women, lovers of debauchery and proud of their arts.

== See also ==
- Caligula
- Gladiator
