= Jenna Jameson =

American pornographic actress (born 1974)

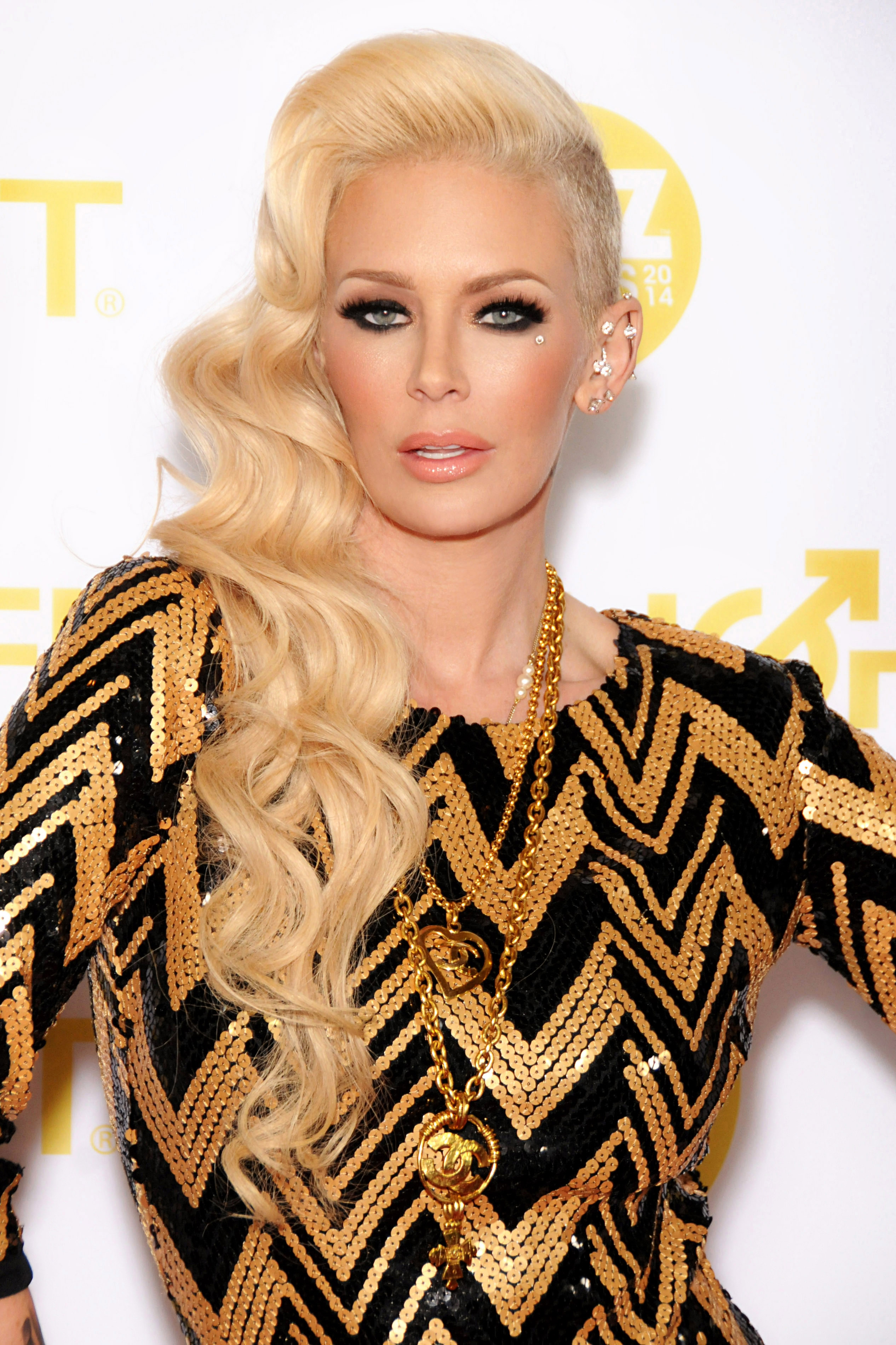
- Jameson in 2014
- Born: Jenna Marie Massoli; April 9, 1974 (age 52); Las Vegas, Nevada, U.S.
- Other names: Jennasis; Daisy Holiday; Daisy Maze
- Education: Bonanza High School
- Occupations: Pornographic film actress; businesswoman; writer; television personality
- Height: 5 ft 3 in (160 cm)
- Spouses: Brad Armstrong (m. 1996; div. 2001) Jay Grdina (m. 2003; div. 2006) Jessi Lawless (m. 2023; ann. 2024) Milagros R. Ocampo (m. 2026)
- Partner(s): Tito Ortiz (2006–2013); Lior Bitton (2015–2023)

Jenna Marie Massoli (born April 9, 1974), known professionally as Jenna Jameson, (Note: Attributed to multiple references:) is an American businesswoman, writer, television personality, and former pornographic film actress. She has been named the world's most famous adult entertainment performer and "The Queen of Porn".

Jameson started acting in erotic videos in 1993 after having worked as a stripper and glamour model. By 1996, she had won the "Top Newcomer" award from each of the three major adult movie organizations. She has since won more than 35 adult-video awards, and has been inducted into the X-Rated Critics Organization (XRCO) and Adult Video News (AVN) Halls of Fame.

Jameson founded the adult-entertainment company ClubJenna in 2000 with Jay Grdina, whom she later married and divorced. Initially, a single website, this business expanded into managing similar websites of other stars and began producing sexually explicit videos in 2001. The first such movie, Briana Loves Jenna (along with Briana Banks), was named as the best-selling and best-renting pornographic title at the 2003 AVN Awards for 2002.

Jameson has also crossed over into mainstream pop culture, starting with a minor role in Howard Stern's biographical comedy film Private Parts (1997).

Jameson announced her retirement from pornography at the 2008 AVN Awards, stating that she would never return to the industry. Although she no longer performs in pornographic films, she began working as a webcam model in 2013. In 2025, Jenna Jameson noted that she "switched sides" and left her previous lifestyle for the Christian faith.

== Early life ==
Jenna Jameson was born Jenna Marie Massoli on April 9, 1974, in Las Vegas, Nevada. Her father, Laurence Henry Massoli, was a police officer at the Las Vegas Sheriff's Department and a program director for KSNV-DT. Her mother, Judith Brooke Hunt, was a showgirl who danced in the Folies Bergère show at the Tropicana Resort & Casino. Jameson and her older brother Tony were raised Catholic. Jameson's mother died of melanoma in 1976, when Jameson was less than two years old. The cancer treatments bankrupted the family, and they moved between Nevada, Arizona, and Montana, usually living in a trailer home or with Jameson's paternal grandmother.

As a child, Jameson took ballet classes and was a frequent entrant in beauty pageants. According to Jameson's autobiography, at the age of 16 she was beaten with rocks and gang raped by four boys while her family was living in Fromberg, Montana. She wrote that less than a year later, she was raped by her boyfriend's uncle, who has denied the accusation. Rather than tell her father about the rape, Jameson left home and moved in with her boyfriend.

== Career ==
=== Early career, education, and name ===
Jameson tried to follow in her mother's career as a Las Vegas showgirl, but most shows rejected her for not meeting the then-typically required height of 5 feet 8 inches (173 cm). Eventually, she was hired at Disneyland Resort, but left after two months, stating concerns over the schedule and salary.

Her then-boyfriend Jack encouraged her to apply for jobs as a dancer, and in 1991, though underage, she began dancing in Las Vegas strip clubs using a fake identification. After six months, she was earning US$2,000 per night, before graduating from Bonanza High School.

Her first stage name as a dancer was "Jennasis", which she later used as the name of a business that she incorporated ("Jennasis Killing Co."). As for picking her permanent professional name, she said, "I had to come up with a good name. I didn't want a porno name. So I sat down, opened up the phone book, and thumbed to the J's, cause I wanted it to match my first name." She saw 'James', but rejected "Jenna James" because it "sounds too porno". Right under that was 'Jameson', which struck her as being the name of the whiskey she likes, and thought, "Ok, that's perfect." That night at work, she saw her brother and asked him what he thought. He said, "I'm drinking Jameson right now." And the name stuck.

Besides dancing, starting later in 1991, she began posing for nude photographs for photographer Suze Randall in Los Angeles, with the intention of getting into Penthouse. After her photos had appeared in several men's magazines under various names, she then stopped working for Randall, feeling Randall was "a shark."

While in high school, she began taking drugs – cocaine, LSD, and methamphetamine – accompanied by her brother (who was addicted to heroin) and at times her father. Her addiction worsened during her four years with her boyfriend. She eventually stopped eating properly and became too thin to model; Jack left her in 1994. She weighed 76 pounds (34 kg) when a friend put her in a wheelchair and sent her to her father, who was then living in Redding, California, to detox; her father did not recognize her when she got off the plane.

=== Pornographic film ===
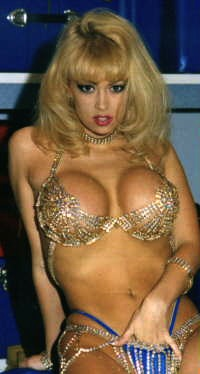
Jameson in 1995

Jameson has said that she started acting in sex videos in retaliation for the infidelity of her then-boyfriend, Jack. She first appeared in an erotic film in 1993, a non-explicit softcore movie by Andrew Blake, with girlfriend Nikki Tyler. Her first pornographic movie scenes were filmed by Randy West and appeared in 1994's Up and Cummers 10 and Up and Cummers 11.

Of her first adult movie, Randy West said

"Jenna contacted me and said she wanted to get into the XXX business, but her agent didn't want her to do porn. A month later, I'm on a shoot in Woodland Hills (a San Fernando Valley section of Los Angeles), and there's Jenna. She said she wanted to get into the business, despite what her agent said. I told her, if you want, to just do a girl-on-girl scene, we can do that. She said she wanted to work with Kylie Ireland, so I set it up. When the sex started, she just fucking rocked! I knew Jenna was special right off the bat. I figured she'd be the next Ginger Lynn, but nobody had any idea she was going to be as big as she turned out to be. Jenna told me when we first met that she was going to be a star."

Jameson got her first breast implants on July 28, 1994, to enhance her stripping and movie careers.

Her first adult video appearances were lesbian scenes (a common way that female performers ease into the business). She says, "Girl-on-girl was easy and natural. Then they offered me lots of money to do boy-girl." Her first heterosexual scene was in Up and Cummers 11 (1994). At the beginning of her career, Jameson promised herself that she would never do anal sex or double penetration scenes on film. Instead, her "signature move" was oral sex, lubricated with saliva. She has also never done any interracial sex scenes with men (despite that category's runaway popularity during the 2000s).

In 1994, after overcoming her drug addiction by spending several weeks with her father and grandmother, Jameson relocated to Los Angeles to live with Nikki Tyler. Her first movie after that was Silk Stockings. Later in 1995, Wicked Pictures, a then-small pornographic film production company, signed her to an exclusive contract. She remembers telling Wicked Pictures founder Steve Orenstein: "The most important thing to me right now is to become the biggest star the industry has ever seen."

The contract earned Jameson US$6,000 for each of eight movies in her first year. Her first big-budget production was Blue Movie (1995), in which she played a reporter investigating a porn set; it won multiple AVN Awards. In 1996, Jameson won top awards from three major industry organizations: the XRCO Best New Starlet award, the AVN Best New Starlet Award, and the Fans of X-Rated Entertainment (F.O.X.E.) Video Vixen award. She was the first entertainer to win all three awards.

By 2001, Jameson earned $60,000 for a day and a half of filming a single DVD, and $8,000 per night dancing at strip clubs. She tried to restrict herself to five films per year and two weeks of dancing per month. Her husband, Jay Grdina, has said that she earned as much as $25,000 per night dancing.

Between 2005 and 2006, she hosted Playboy TV's Jenna's American Sex Star, where prospective porn stars compete in sexual performances for a contract with her company, ClubJenna. Winners of the contracts for the first two years were Brea Bennett and Roxy Jezel.

In January 2008, Jameson confirmed she was retiring from pornographic performances and has since said that she "won't even do a Maxim cover."

Jameson's first appearance at an adult-entertainment event since announcing her retirement was at the 2013 Exxxotica New Jersey convention in October. On January 15, 2014, Fleshlight released Jameson's signature artificial vagina. Jameson was also the master of ceremonies for the 2014 XBIZ Awards on January 24.

=== Business ventures ===
Jameson and Grdina formed ClubJenna as an Internet pornography company in 2000.

Early ClubJenna films starred Jameson herself, limiting herself to on-screen sex with other women or with Grdina, who appeared as Justin Sterling. The first ClubJenna film, Briana Loves Jenna (2001), co-produced with Vivid, cost US$280,000 to make, and grossed over $1 million in its first year. It was the best-selling and best-renting pornographic title of its year, winning twin AVN Awards. It was marketed as "Jenna. Her first boy/girl scene in over 2 years," referring to Jameson's abstention from heterosexual on-film intercourse. Grdina has stated that Jameson's films averaged sales of 100,000 copies, compared with run-of-the-mill pornographic films, which did well to sell 5,000. On the other hand, he also said that their films took up to twelve days to film, compared with one day for other pornographic films.

In a January 2009 interview with William Shatner on Shatner's Raw Nerve, Jameson said she came close to buying Penthouse magazine when publisher Bob Guccione filed for Chapter 11 reorganization of his business (which occurred in August 2003), but was thwarted when someone else swooped in and bought up all the stock. New York Magazine's Intelligencer quoted a source from Penthouse as saying "I'm sure she is considering it", adding that Jameson was to be the cover girl in January 2004 – and "it's a really wild-looking shoot, even for a porn star."

In 2005, Jameson first directed a film, The Provocateur, released as Jenna's Provocateur in September 2006.

ClubJenna was run as a family business, with Grdina's sister, Kris, as vice president in charge of merchandising.

Jameson also capitalized on merchandising herself. Since May 2003, she has been appearing on a 48-foot (15 m) tall billboard in New York City's Times Square promoting her website and movies. The first advertisement displayed her wearing only a thong and read "Who Says They Cleaned Up Times Square?" There is a line of sex toys licensed to Doc Johnson, and an "anatomically correct" Jenna Jameson action figure. She stars in her own sex simulation video game, Virtually Jenna, in which the goal is to bring a 3D model of her to orgasm. In 2006, New York City-based Wicked Cow Entertainment started to expand her brand to barware, perfume, handbags, lingerie, and footwear, sold through high-end retailers such as Saks Fifth Avenue and Colette boutiques. Her film and merchandising success enabled her to attain her goal of becoming the top porn star in the world.

In August 2005, ClubJenna launched Club Thrust, an interactive website for Jameson's gay male fans, which includes videos, galleries, sex advice, gossip, and downloads. The director of webmaster relations for ClubJenna said the straight site had always had a lot of gay traffic. By 2006, ClubJenna administered more than 150 official sites for other adult entertainment industry stars.

In August 2005, a group of business investors that included Jameson purchased Babes Cabaret, a strip club in Scottsdale, Arizona, intending to make it the first foray of ClubJenna into live entertainment. Soon after the purchase attracted attention, the Scottsdale City Council proposed a new ordinance banning nudity at adult-entertainment venues and requiring a four-foot divider restricting contact with dancers. Such a divider would have also effectively banned lap dances, the dancers' main source of revenue. Jameson argued strongly against the ordinance and helped organize a petition against it. On September 12, 2006, in a referendum on the ordinance, voters struck down the stricter rules, allowing the club to continue operating as before.

On February 3, 2006, Jameson hosted a "Vivid ClubJenna Super Bowl Party" with several other ClubJenna and Vivid Girls at the Zoo Club in Detroit, Michigan, for a $500 to $1,000 ticket price. It featured a lingerie show, but no planned nudity or sex acts. When first announced, the party caused controversy with the National Football League, which did not sanction this as an official Super Bowl event. In 2007, Jameson signed up to play quarterback in the Lingerie Bowl, but retired due to her insurance company's damage concerns. She instead acted as a commentator.

On June 22, 2006, Playboy Enterprises announced that it had bought ClubJenna Inc., along with an agreement to have both Jameson and Grdina stay on as contracted executives. Playboy CEO Christie Hefner said that she expected to rapidly increase film production, producing about thirty features in the first year, and will expand the way they are sold, not only as DVDs but through TV channels, video-on-demand services, and mobile phones. On November 1, 2006, Playboy renamed one of the Spice Network's pay-per-view channels from The Hot Network to ClubJenna.

=== Books ===
Jameson's autobiography, How to Make Love Like a Porn Star: A Cautionary Tale, was published in 2004. It was co-written with Neil Strauss, a contributor to The New York Times and Rolling Stone, and published by ReganBooks, a division of HarperCollins. The autobiography also won the 2004 "Mainstream's Adult Media Favorite" XRCO Award in a tie with Seymore Butts's Family Business TV series. It was translated into German as Pornostar. Die Autobiographie in November 2005, and Spanish as Cómo Hacer El Amor Igual Que Una Estrella Porno in January 2006.

The book covers her early career from her beginning in show business, living with her tattoo artist boyfriend, through receiving the Pornographic Hot d'Or award at Cannes, and wedding pictures from her second marriage. It does not omit sordid details, describing her two rapes, drug addictions, an unhappy first marriage, and numerous affairs with men and women. The first-person narrative is broken up by personal photos, childhood diary entries, family interviews, movie scripts, and comic panels.

The autobiography publisher, Judith Regan, also served as executive producer of a tie-in television news special, Jenna Jameson's Confessions, airing on VH1 on August 16, 2004, one day before the book's launch. In April 2005, ReganBooks and Jameson filed lawsuits against each other. The point of contention was a proposed reality show about Jameson's everyday life, discussed between her then-husband, Jay Grdina, and the A&E Network. ReganBooks maintained that any A&E deal was a breach of Jameson's contract, which indicated that ReganBooks had a stake in the profits generated by both the special based on her memoir and a reality-based series, as well as "any similar projects". Jameson's suit claimed that the A&E deal preceded the ReganBooks contract. The reality series had still not materialized, and the lawsuit was still being discussed, when HarperCollins fired Judith Regan on December 15, 2006, over an unrelated issue.

In January 2007, Jameson was reported to be in talks with producers on turning the autobiography into a movie. In March 2007, Jameson was reportedly missing meetings with producers, thus endangering the movie, due to problems with a recent vaginoplasty.

In April 2013, Jameson announced she was working on a fictional erotic novel called Sugar. It was co-written with Hope Tarr and published by Skyhorse Publishing. It was released on October 21, 2013.

=== Mainstream appearances ===
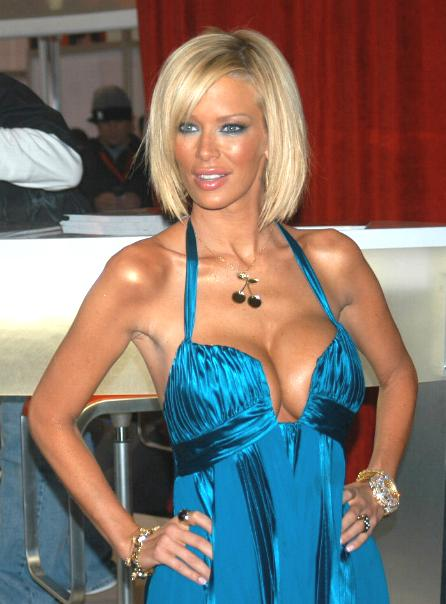
Jameson in 2005

Jameson is also known for achieving a high level of celebrity outside of pornography – even bringing pornography itself closer to mainstream society's awareness and acceptance.

In 1995, Jameson sent photos of herself to radio host Howard Stern. She became a regular guest on his show and played the role of "Mandy", the "First Nude Woman on Radio", in Stern's semi-autobiographical 1997 film Private Parts. This film appearance was the beginning of a series of non-pornographic film and television roles. In 1997, Jameson made an appearance for an Extreme Championship Wrestling pay-per-view, Hardcore Heaven (1997), as the valet for the Dudley Boyz; another appearance at ECW Living Dangerously on March 1, 1998; and a few months where she was ECW's on-screen interviewer. In 1998, she filmed a vignette with Val Venis, a character in the WWE, for airing on WWE programming. In the late 1990s, Jameson guest-hosted several episodes of the E! cable network's hit travel/adventure/party show Wild On!, appearing scantily clad in tropical locations. Jameson was featured and interviewed on the British television show European Blue Review on Channel 5.

Jameson appeared in a 2002 music video for the Eminem song "Without Me". She can be seen in bed with Eminem as one of the "two trailer park girls" (the other one is fitness model Kiana Tom) that "go round the outside". Jameson voiced an animated version of herself in a July 2001 episode of Family Guy entitled "Brian Does Hollywood". Her character won an award for acting in a porn film directed by Brian Griffin, and at the close of the episode, Peter Griffin kidnaps her. In 2002, Jameson and Ron Jeremy played themselves in Comedy Central's first feature television movie, Porn 'n Chicken, in the roles of speakers for a pornography viewing club. Also in 2002, she appeared in two video games, most notably voicing Candy Suxxx in Grand Theft Auto: Vice City. Her character begins as a prostitute, but goes on to become a successful pornographic actress and is displayed on several billboards within the game. Her performance won the 2003 G-Phoria "Best Live Action/Voice Performance Award – Female". She also provided both the appearance and the voice for "Daisy", a secret playable character for the video game Tony Hawk's Pro Skater 4, who performs provocative tricks with her clothing and skateboard. In 2003, Jameson appeared in two episodes of the NBC prime-time television show Mister Sterling as the girlfriend of a political financier.

In the months following the publication of her autobiography, she was interviewed on NBC, CNBC, Fox News, and CNN, and the book was reviewed by The New York Times, Reuters, and other major media outlets.

Jameson was featured prominently in Samhain, a low-budget horror film in which she starred with other pornographic actresses, including Ginger Lynn Allen. It was filmed in 2002 but had sat unreleased until 2005, when it was re-cut and released as Evil Breed: The Legend of Samhain. She had another minor horror film role in Sin-Jin Smyth, delayed from release until late 2006.

In February 2006, Comedy Central announced plans to feature Jameson as "P-Whip", in a starring role in its first animated mobile phone series, Samurai Love God. Mediaweek called her the biggest name attached to the project. In April 2006, Jameson was the star of a video podcast ad for Adidas, advertising Adicolor shoes by playing a provocative game of whack a mole. Jameson made an appearance in the American reality TV show The Simple Life in the fifth-season episode "Committed", broadcast on July 1, 2007; Paris Hilton and Nicole Richie, while working in a "love camp", brought her in to help throw a "love ceremony" vow for the five dysfunctional couples. In 2008, Jameson had another starring role in the comedy horror film Zombie Strippers, loosely based on Eugène Ionesco's play Rhinoceros. Madame Tussauds has a wax model of Jameson.

On August 27, 2015, Jameson became a contestant on the sixteenth series of the British reality series Celebrity Big Brother, representing the United States.

==== Controversial mainstream appearances ====
Some of her mainstream appearances sparked controversy. An interview with Jameson contained in the 1999 Abercrombie & Fitch A&F Quarterly was part of the motivation for Michigan Attorney General Jennifer Granholm and Illinois Lieutenant Governor Corinne Wood to speak out against the hybrid magazine-catalog. The campaign was joined by parents and Christian conservative groups, and Abercrombie removed it from shelves in 2003.

In November 2001, the Oxford Union debating society invited Jameson to come to Oxford to argue against the proposition "The House Believes that Porn is Harmful." She wrote in her diary at the time, "I feel like I am going to be out of my element, but, I could never pass this chance up ... it's a once in a lifetime thing." In the end, her side won the debate 204 to 27.

In February 2003, Pony International planned to feature her as one of several pornographic actors in advertisements for athletic shoes. This was attacked by Bill O'Reilly of Fox News in an editorial called "Using Quasi-Prostitutes to Sell Sneakers", calling pornographic actors inappropriate role models for teens. In response, The Harvard Crimson proposed a boycott of O'Reilly and Fox News. Jameson herself sent a sarcastic email to the show, writing:

I hope Bill understands the difference between a porn star and a hooker. I assume he has done some research on the subject because he requested some of my videos after we finished taping my appearance. I imagine he wanted them for professional reasons.

== Awards ==
Year	Ceremony	Award	Work	Co-winners
1995	NightMoves Award	Best New Starlet	—N/a	—N/a
1996	AVN Award	Best Actress – Video	Wicked One	—N/a
1996	AVN Award	Best Couples Sex Scene – Film	Blue Movie	T.T. Boy
1996	AVN Award	Best New Starlet	—N/a	—N/a
1996	F.O.X.E. Award	Video Vixen	—N/a	—N/a
1996	Hot d'Or Award	Best New American Starlet	—N/a	—N/a
1996	Hot d'Or Award	Best American Actress	—N/a	—N/a
1996	XRCO Award	Starlet of the Year	—N/a	—N/a
1996	NightMoves Award	Best Actress	—N/a	—N/a
1997	AVN Award	Best Couples Sex Scene – Film	Jenna Loves Rocco	Rocco Siffredi
1997	AVN Award	Best Couples Sex Scene – Video	Conquest	Vince Vouyer
1997	F.O.X.E. Award	Female Fan Favorite	—N/a	Jeanna Fine & Shane
1997	Hot d'Or Award	Best American Actress	—N/a	—N/a
1997	NightMoves Award	Best Actress	—N/a	—N/a
1998	AVN Award	Best All-Girl Sex Scene – Film	Satyr	Missy
1998	F.O.X.E. Award	Female Fan Favorite	—N/a	Tiffany Mynx, Stacy Valentine & Stephanie Swift
1998	Hot d'Or Award	Best American Actress	Sexe de Feu, Coeur de Glace	—N/a
2002	KSEXradio Listener's Choice Award	Favorite Porn Star	—N/a	—N/a
2003	AVN Award	Best All-Girl Sex Scene – Video	I Dream of Jenna	Autumn & Nikita Denise
2003	Hustler	Porn Block of Fame	—N/a	—N/a
2003	Adam Film World Guide Award	Best All-Girl Sex Scene – Video	Briana Loves Jenna	Briana Banks
2003	G-Phoria Award	Best Female Voice Performance	Grand Theft Auto: Vice City	—N/a
2003	NightMoves Award	Best Adult Internet Site (Fan's Choice)	ClubJenna.com	—N/a
2003	NightMoves Award	Best Feature Production (Fan's Choice)	Jenna Loves Kobe	Kobe Tai
2003	KSEXradio Listener's Choice Award	Favorite Porn Star	—N/a	—N/a
2004	XRCO Award	Best Girl/Girl scene	My Plaything: Jenna Jameson 2	Carmen Luvana
2004	Free Speech Coalition	Positive Image Award	—N/a	—N/a
2004	NightMoves Award	Best Adult Internet Site (Fan's Choice)	ClubJenna.com	—N/a
2004	NightMoves Award	Best Feature Production (Fan's Choice)	Bella Loves Jenna	Belladonna
2004	KSEXradio Listener's Choice Award	Favorite Porn Star	—N/a	—N/a
2005	AVN Award	Best Actress, Film	The Masseuse	—N/a
2005	AVN Award	Best All-Girl Sex Scene, Film	The Masseuse	Savanna Samson
2005	AVN Award	Best Couples Sex Scene, Film	The Masseuse	Justin Sterling
2005	AEBN VOD Award	Performer of the Year	—N/a	—N/a
2005	Adam Film World Guide Award	Female Pornographer of the Year	How to Make Love Like Porn Star: A Cautionary Tale	—N/a
2005	Adam Film World Guide Award	Best Actress	—N/a	—N/a
2005	XRCO Award	Mainstream's Adult Media Favorite	How to Make Love Like a Porn Star: A Cautionary Tale	Tied with Seymore Butts/Family Business
2005	XRCO Award	Hall of Fame	—N/a	—N/a
2005	NightMoves Award	Best Production Company (Editor's Choice)	Club Jenna	—N/a
2006	AVN Award	Hall of Fame	—N/a	—N/a
2006	AVN Award	Crossover Star of the Year	—N/a	—N/a
2006	AVN Award	Best Supporting Actress—Film	The New Devil in Miss Jones	Savanna Samson
2006	AVN Award	Best All-Girl Sex Scene – Film	The New Devil in Miss Jones	Savanna Samson
2006	XBIZ Award	Businesswoman of the Year	—N/a	—N/a
2006	F.A.M.E. Award	Favorite Adult Actress	—N/a	—N/a
2006	F.A.M.E. Award	Fan Favorite for Hottest Body	—N/a	—N/a
2006	NightMoves Award	Best Production Company (Fan's Choice)	Club Jenna	—N/a
2007	AVN Award	Crossover Star of the Year	—N/a	—N/a
2007	F.A.M.E. Award	Favorite Performer of All Time	—N/a	—N/a
2007	NightMoves Award	Hall of Fame	—N/a	—N/a

== Personal life ==
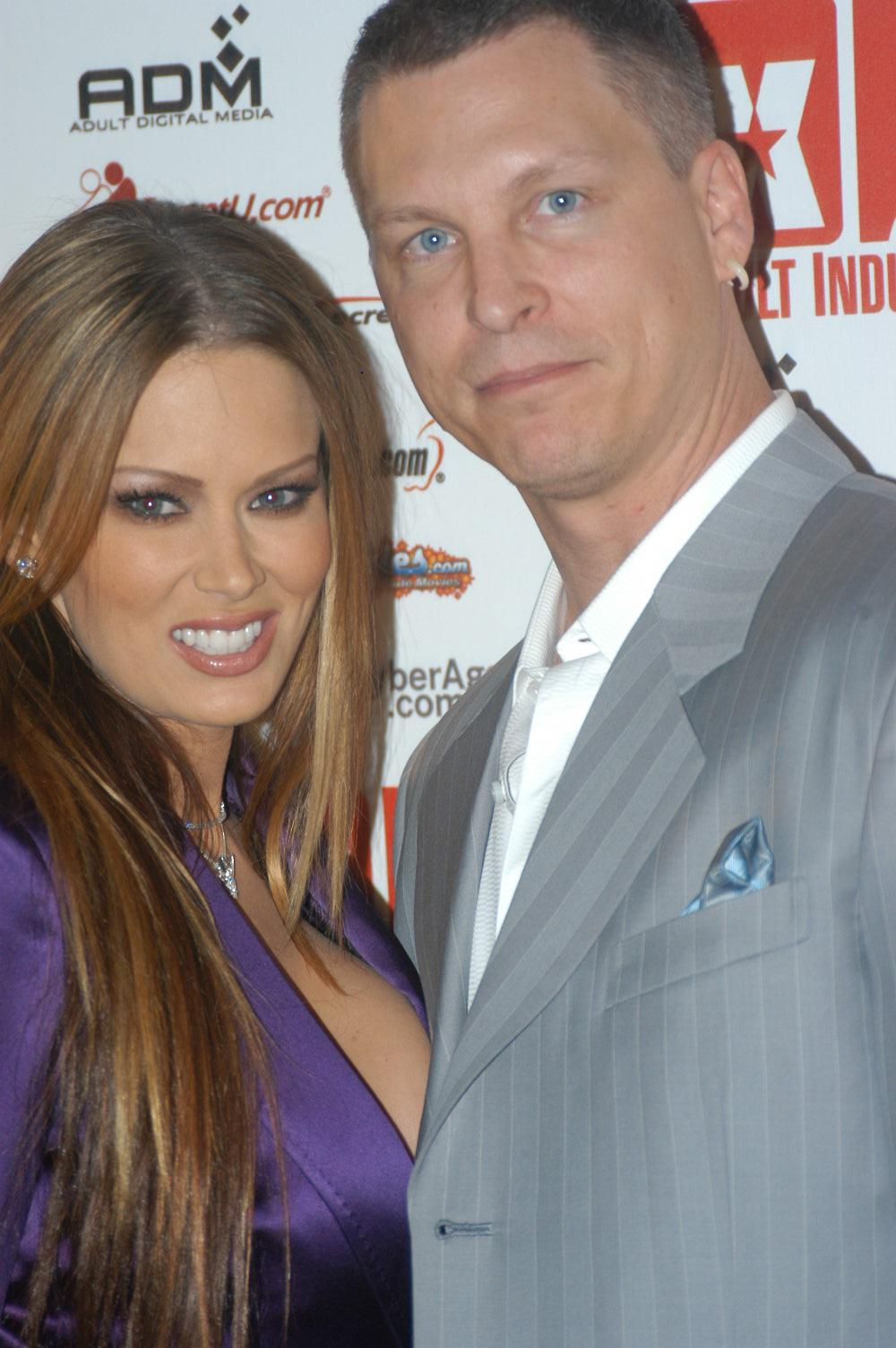
Jameson with her then-husband Jay Grdina in 2005

In 2004 Jameson stated that she was bisexual, and that she had had sex with 100 women and 30 men off-screen in her life, but by 2008 she described herself as "totally hetero". She has stated the best relationship she ever had was her lesbian relationship with porn actress Nikki Tyler, which she documents in her autobiography. They lived together at the start of her porn career and again before her second marriage. Famous boyfriends discussed in her autobiography include Marilyn Manson and Tommy Lee.

On December 20, 1996, Jameson married porn star/Wicked Pictures director Brad Armstrong. The marriage lasted just 10 weeks. Although they informally separated in March 1997, she remained contractually obligated to work on Wicked Pictures projects involving both of them. They legally separated and divorced in March 2001.

Jameson met former pornographic studio owner Jay Grdina, scion of a wealthy cattle-ranching family, who had entered pornographic film production after college. From 1998 until Jameson's retirement, Grdina was Jameson's only on-screen male sex partner, acting under the name Justin Sterling. They were engaged in December 2000, well before her divorce from Armstrong, and married June 22, 2003. They tried to have children from mid-2004 onwards, as Jameson had planned to retire from adult entertainment upon becoming a mother. The couple resided in Scottsdale, Arizona, in a 6,700-square-foot (620 m^{2}) Spanish-style mansion, bought for $2 million in 2002.

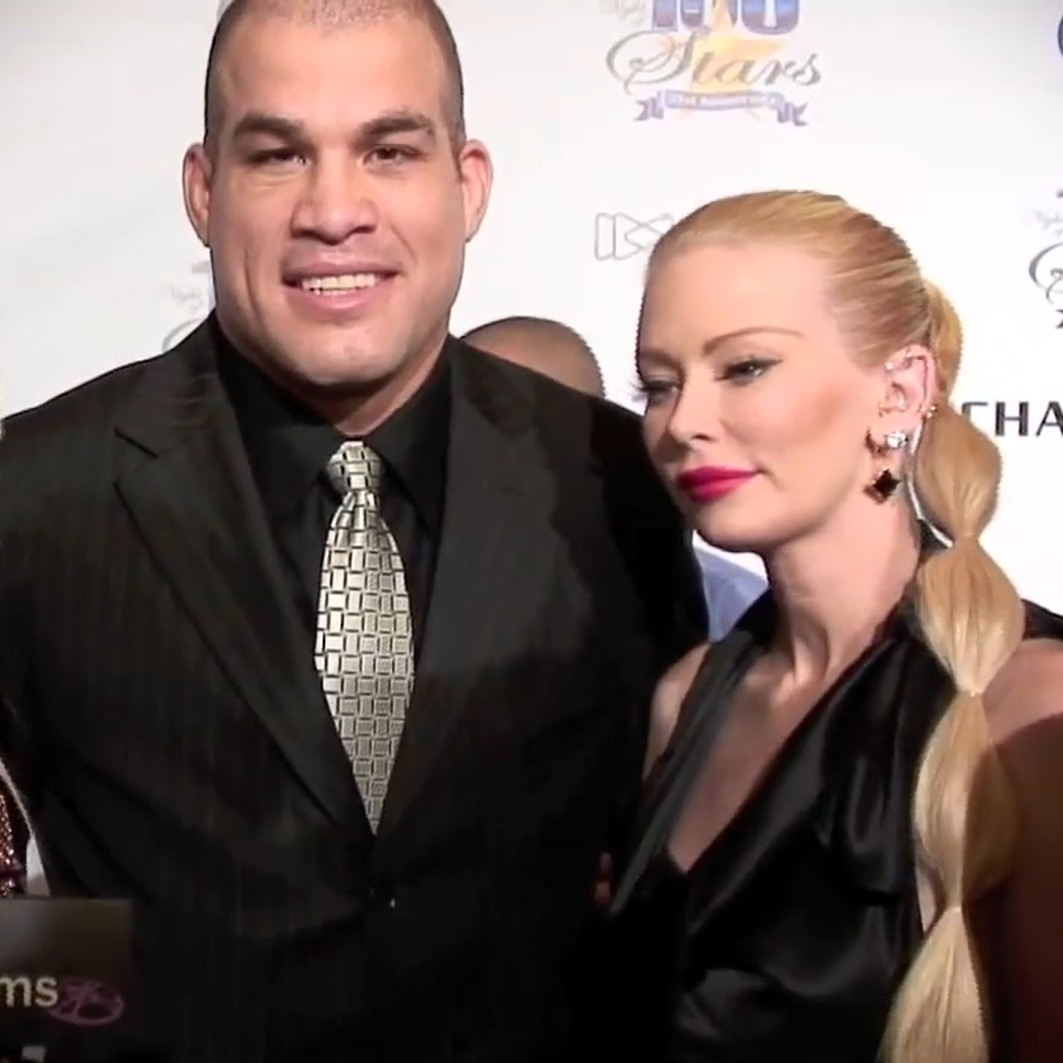
Tito Ortiz with Jameson in 2011

In October 2006, it was reported that Jameson began dating mixed martial artist and former UFC champion Tito Ortiz, whom she met on Myspace. On December 12, 2006, Jameson filed for divorce from Grdina.

Jameson announced in August 2008 that she and Ortiz were expecting twins in April 2009. On March 16, 2009, Jameson gave birth to twin boys. Jameson and Ortiz split up in March 2013. Ortiz was granted full custody of the twins.

Jameson's father died on October 2, 2010, after suffering complications from triple bypass surgery.

On May 25, 2012, Jameson was arrested in Westminster, California and charged with three misdemeanor counts for driving under the influence of alcohol or other drugs, driving with a blood-alcohol level over the state legal limit, and driving on a suspended license after her Range Rover struck a light pole. She initially pleaded not guilty to the charges, but later changed her plea to guilty. She was sentenced to three years of informal probation, ordered to pay $340 in fines, and participate in a Mothers Against Drunk Driving victim impact panel. The charge for driving without a valid license was dismissed.

As of 2014, Jameson had undergone extensive tattooing, almost completely covering both of her arms in sleeve tattoos.

In June 2015, Jameson announced that she was converting to Judaism, to marry her boyfriend, Lior Bitton. In October of that year, Israel's Channel 2 announced a reality television series documenting Jameson's conversion.

On August 5, 2016, Jameson announced that she and Bitton were expecting their first child together. On April 6, 2017, they welcomed a daughter, whom they named Batel.

On January 12, 2022, Jameson announced that she was suffering from Guillain–Barré syndrome, although this was later proven to be a misdiagnosis.

On February 1, 2023, Jameson confirmed in a TikTok video that she and Bitton had ended their relationship, and was in a relationship with barber and influencer Jessi Lawless. She married Lawless on May 23, 2023.

On April 17, 2024, Jameson's wife Jessi Lawless filed for annulment of their marriage after less than a year. Lawless posted a video on her Instagram explaining that "the 50-year-old former adult film star's alleged drinking led to her decision to end the marriage."

In November 2025, Jenna Jameson embraced Christianity and received the sacrament of baptism. Jameson noted that she was interested in "helping others find Jesus too".

On July 25, 2026, Jameson married author Milagros R. Ocampo in Miami.

== See also ==
- List of pornographic film actors who appeared in mainstream films

== Works cited ==
- Jameson, Jenna; Strauss, Neil (2003). How to Make Love Like a Porn Star: A Cautionary Tale. New York: ReganBooks. ISBN 978-0-06-053909-2.
- Lim, Gerrie (2006). In Lust We Trust: Adventures in Adult Cinema. Lanham, Md.: Monsoon Books. ISBN 978-981-4358-12-5.
