= 27th AVN Awards =

US adult industry award ceremony in 2010

- Date: January 9, 2010
- Site: Pearl Theater; Palms Casino Resort; Paradise, Nevada
- Hosted by: Dave Attell; Kayden Kross; Kirsten Price
- Preshow hosts: Jessica Drake; Jesse Jane; Dave Navarro
- Produced by: Gary Miller; Jeff Roe
- Directed by: Gary Miller

Highlights
- Best Picture: The 8th Day (Best Video Feature)
- Most awards: The 8th Day (9)
- Most nominations: The 8th Day (20)

Television coverage
- Network: Showtime
- Duration: 1 hour, 49 minutes

The 27th AVN Awards ceremony in Las Vegas, presented by Adult Video News (AVN), honored the best pornographic movies of 2009. The ceremony was held on January 9, 2010, in a new venue, the Pearl Concert Theater inside the Palms Casino Resort in Paradise, Nevada. During the ceremony, AVN Media Network presented awards in 125 of categories of movies or products released between October 1, 2008, and September 30, 2009. The ceremony was televised in the United States by Showtime. Comedian Dave Attell hosted the show with co-hosts Kirsten Price and Kayden Kross.

Among the new award categories introduced was Best Sex Parody due to the genre's quality and market impact. The category was one of three at the awards show where a tie was declared and in this instance The Sex Files: A Dark XXX Parody, an action-adventure send-up of The X-Files, and Not the Cosbys XXX, a spoof of The Cosby Show, were co-winners.

The 8th Day earned Best Video Feature honors and eight more awards and 21-year-old Tori Black won her first Female Performer of the Year award and won or shared five others, while Kagney Linn Karter won the Best New Starlet Award. Manuel Ferrara won his third Male Performer of the Year Award, joining Lexington Steele as the only actors to have done so.

== Winners and nominees ==
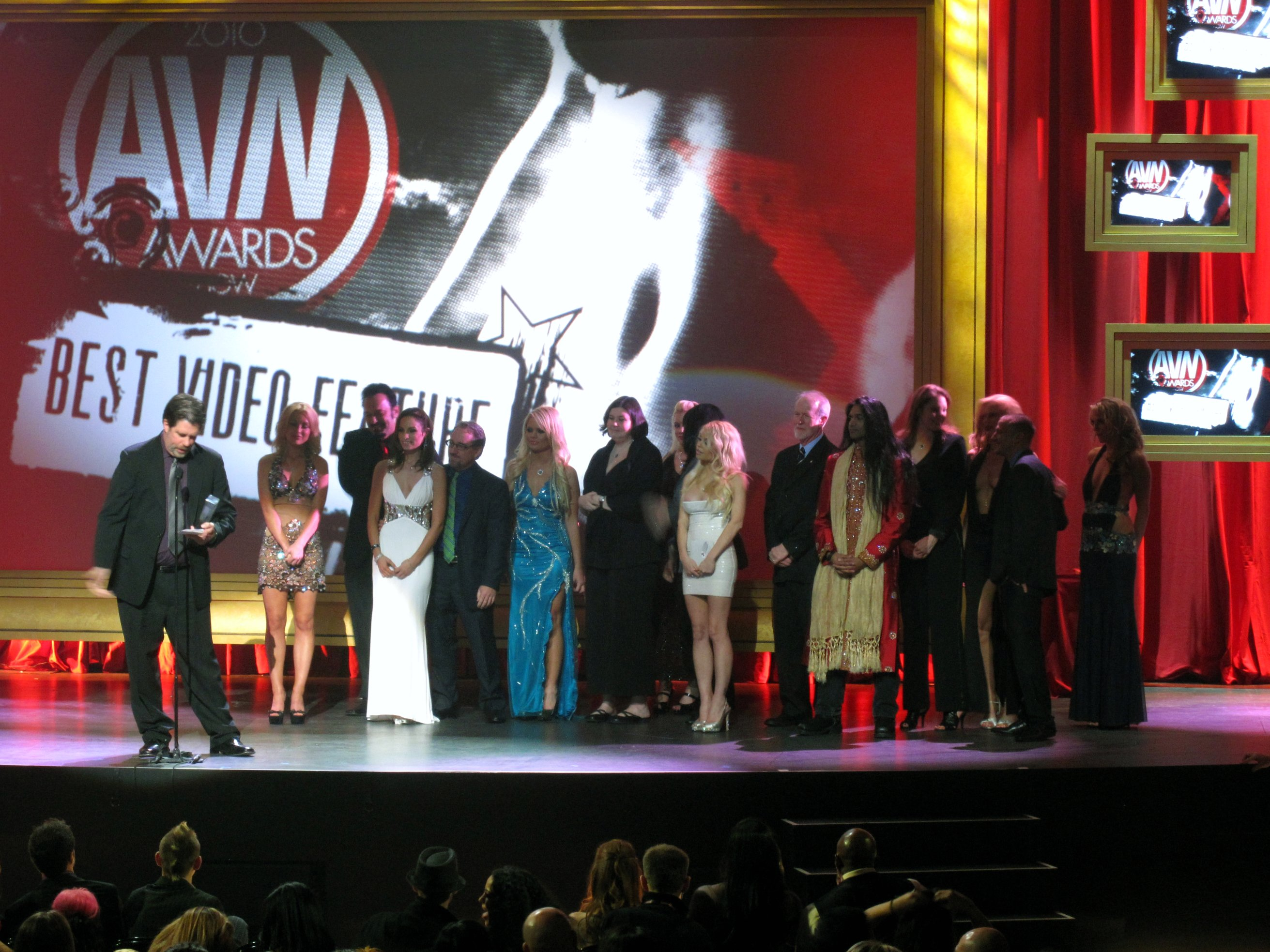
Cast and crew of The 8th Day accepting Best Video Feature award

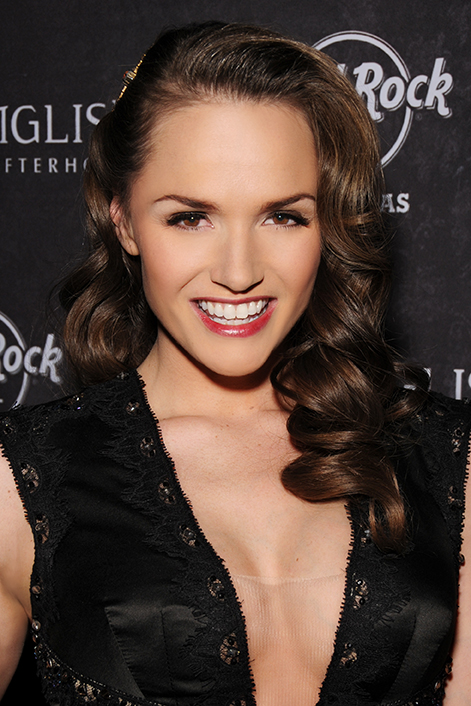
Tori Black, winner of the 2010 AVN Female Performer of the Year Award

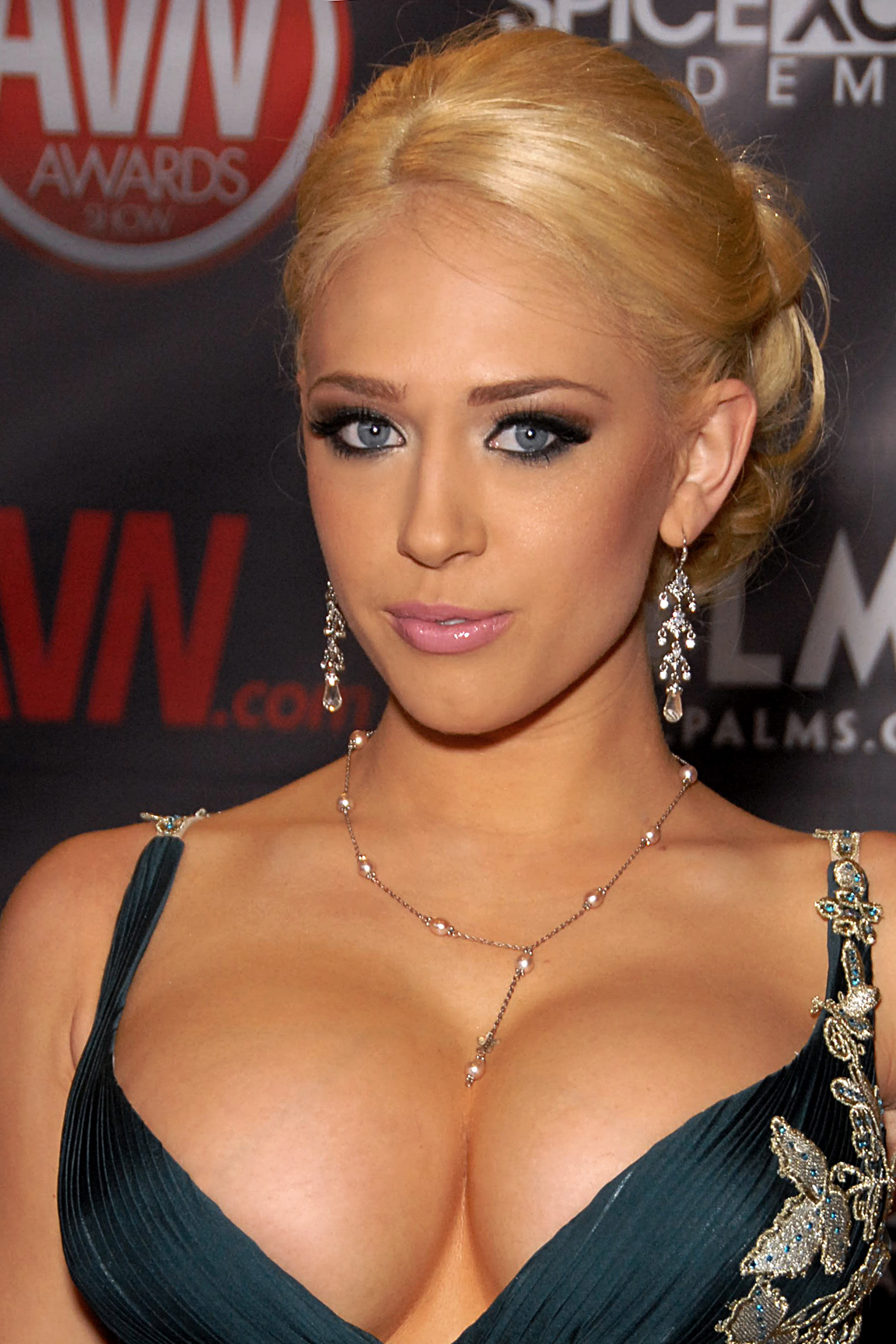
Kagney Linn Karter, winner of the 2010 AVN Best New Starlet Award

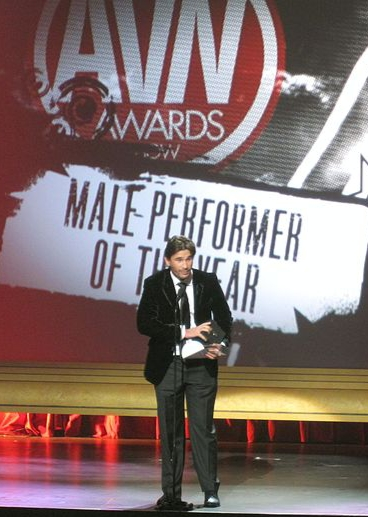
Manuel Ferrara, winner of the 2010 AVN Male Performer of the Year Award

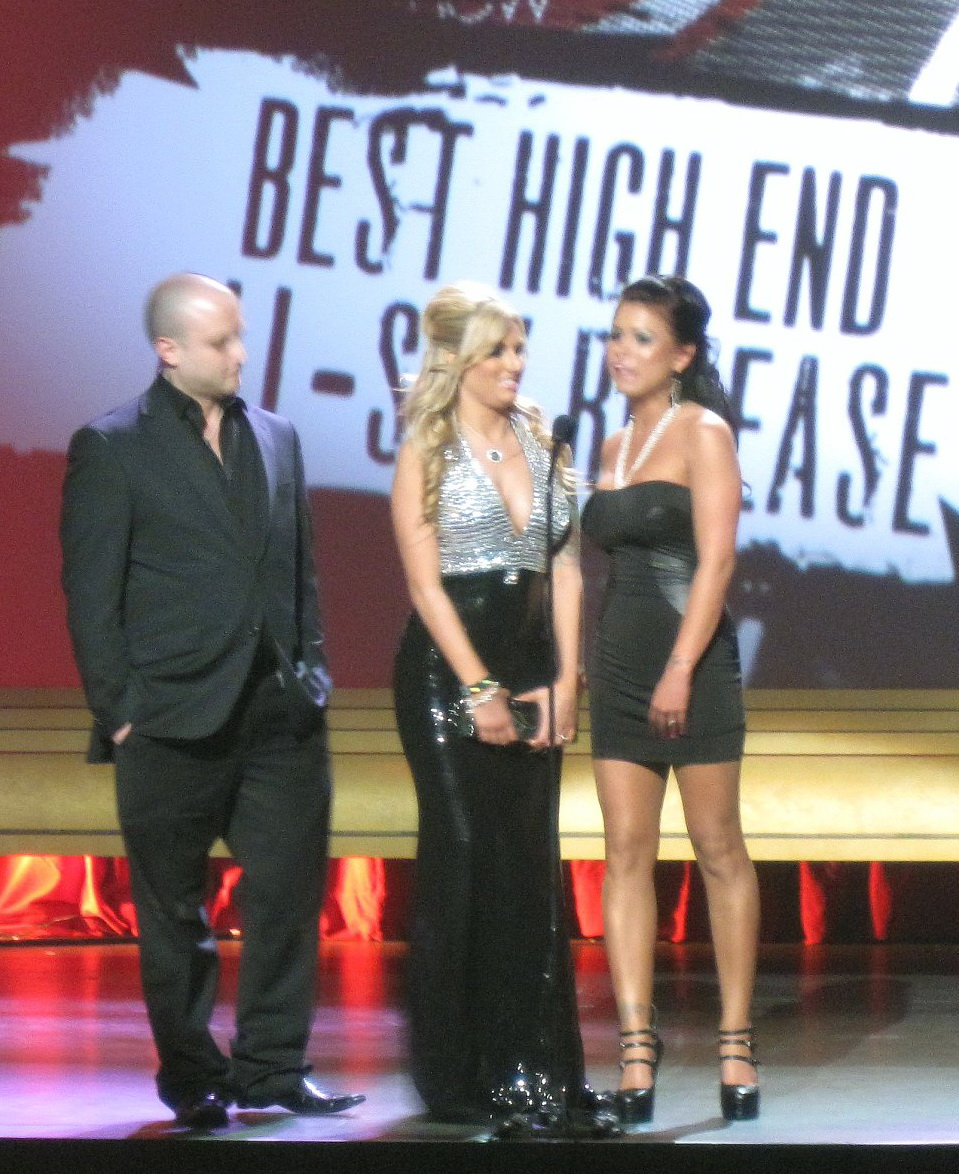
Director and executive producer Joshua and stars Teagan Presley and Eva Angelina accept the award for Best High End All-Sex Release at the 2010 AVNs for Deviance

Sasha Grey at AVN Awards 2010, Best Oral Sex Scene

The nominees for the 27th AVN Awards were announced on December 2, 2009, in a press release. The winners were announced during the awards ceremony on January 9, 2010, which was broadcast on Showtime.

=== Major Awards ===
Award winners are listed first and highlighted in boldface.

Best Video Feature	Best New Starlet
**The 8th Day**; 2040; Big Ass Stalker; Champion: Love Hurts; Educating Alli; Faithless; Fleshed Out; Heaven; Hush; Law & Lust; My Daughter's Boyfriend; Pure; Pussy a Go Go; The Surrender of O; Throat: A Cautionary Tale	**Kagney Linn Karter**; Asa Akira; Britney Amber; Angelina Armani; Kiara Diane; London Keyes; Tanner Mayes; Nicole Ray; Emy Reyes; Natalia Rossi; Aryana Starr; Riley Steele; Janie Summers; Brynn Tyler; Sadie West
Male Performer of the Year	Female Performer of the Year
**Manuel Ferrara**; Marco Banderas; Mick Blue; Tom Byron; James Deen; Tony DeSergio; Erik Everhard; Mr. Marcus; Sean Michaels; Mr. Pete; Anthony Rosano; Evan Stone; Rico Strong; Prince Yahshua	**Tori Black**; Belladonna; Lexi Belle; Ashlynn Brooke; Dana DeArmond; Chayse Evans; Jenna Haze; Kayden Kross; Jesse Jane; Amber Rayne; Nikki Rhodes; Ann Marie Rios; Kristina Rose; Bobbi Starr; Misty Stone
Best Actor	Best Actress
**Eric Swiss − Not Married With Children XXX**; Ace − The Jeffersons: A XXX Parody; Keni Styles − Pure; Otto Bauer − Everybody Loves Lucy; James Deen − Scrubs: A XXX Parody; Guy DiSIlva − Barrack's Big Stimulus Package; Tommy Gunn − Heaven; Eric Masterson − Hush; Sean Michaels − L.A. Pink; Anthony Rosano − The Sex Files: A Dark XXX Parody; Herschel Savage − 30 Rock: A XXX Parody; Randy Spears − Educating Alli; Evan Stone − Pussy a Go Go; Voodoo − The Cougar Hunter; Frankie Young − Jon & Kate Fuck Eight	**Kimberly Kane − The Sex Files: A Dark XXX Parody**; Asa Akira − Pure; Julia Ann − Identity; Lisa Ann − Who's Nailin' Paylin?; Alektra Blue − Educating Alli; Jessica Drake − Hush; Sasha Grey − Throat: A Cautionary Tale; Audrey Hollander − Everybody Loves Lucy; Kayden Kross − The 8th Day; Kelli McCarty − Faithless; Melissa Monet − My Daughter's Boyfriend; Bree Olson − One Last Ride; Hillary Scott − Heaven; India Summer − Drill Baby Drill; Roxy DeVille − Whack Job
Best Director — Feature	Best Ethnic-Themed Series — Black
**David Aaron Clark − Pure**; Brad Armstrong − 2040; Bishop − Big Ass Stalker; Axel Braun − This Ain't Happy Days XXX; Robby D. − Teachers; Stormy Daniels − Operation: Tropical Stormy; Ernest Greene − The Surrender of O; Sam Hain − The Sex Files: A Dark XXX Parody; Lee Roy Myers − Seinfeld: A XXX Parody; Michael Raven − Hush; Will Ryder − Flight Attendants; Ren Savant − The 8th Day; Josh Stone − Law & Lust; Paul Thomas − Throat: A Cautionary Tale; Winkytiki − Pussy a Go Go	**Black Ass Master − Alexander DeVoe/Jules Jordan**; Big Ass Anal Heaven; Black Iz Beautiful; Big Black Wet Asses; Big Phat Apple Bottom Bootys; The Black Assassin; Booty Call; Chocolate Sorority Sistas; My Baby Got Back; Newbie Black; New Black Cheerleader Search; Phatty Girls; Rap Video Auditions; Round & Brown; Wet Juicy Asses
Best Sex Comedy	Best Parody
**Flight Attendants**; Booby Trap; Bree's College Daze 2; The Cougar Hunter; The Crack Pack; Drill Baby Drill; Funny Bone; Korporate Kougars; One Wild and Crazy Night; Operation: Tropical Stormy; The Pinch; Popporn: The Guide to Making Fuck; Teachers; Whack Job; Who's Nailin' Paylin?	**The Sex Files: A Dark XXX Parody**; **Not the Cosbys XXX**; 30 Rock: A XXX Parody; Celebrity Apprentass; Crock of Love; Everybody Loves Lucy; The Jeffersons: a XXX Parody; Jon & Kate Fuck Eight; L.A. Pink; Not Married With Children XXX; Pink's Anatomy; Scrubs: A XXX Parody; Seinfeld: A XXX Parody; This Ain't Star Trek XXX; This Ain't Happy Days XXX; TMSleaze
Best Gonzo Release	Best All-Girl Release
**Tori Black Is Pretty Filthy**; Bobbi Starr & Dana DeArmond's Insatiable Voyage; Buttman's Oddyssey; Cum-Spoiled Sluts; Filthy 3; Fresh Meat 25; Innocent Until Proven Filthy 5; Oil Overload 2; Poolside Pussy; Raw 2; Rocco Ravishes L.A.; Shane's World 41; Slut Puppies 3; Slutty and Sluttier 9; Sweet Cheeks 11	**Evil Pink 4**; Anal Lesbian Sweethearts; Erocktavision 10: In Between the Sheets; Field of Schemes 5; Girlfriend Vignettes; Girls Kissing Girls 3; Girls Made to Love; Girl Play; Kittens & Cougars; Lesbian Bridal Stories 4; Lesbian Tutors 8; No Boyz Just Toyz; Supermodel Slumber Party; Unfaithful 4; The Violation of Kylie Ireland
Best High-End All-Sex Release	Best Group Sex Scene
**Deviance**; Addicted 6; Buttwoman Returns; Dreamgirlz 2; The Five; Fuck The World; Glamour Girls 2; House of Wicked; Jesse Jane: Atomic Tease; Johnny Loves Morgan; Kristina Rose: Dirty Girl; Live in My Secrets; Night Trips: A Dark Odyssey; Jenna Haze: Nymphomaniac; Performers of the Year 2009	**Jessica Drake, Kirsten Price, Alektra Blue, Mikayla Mendez, Kaylani Lei, Tory Lane, Jayden Jaymes, Kayla Carrera, Randy Spears, Brad Armstrong, Rocco Reed, Marcus London, Mick Blue, T. J. Cummings − 2040**; Darryl Hanah, Trinity Post, Amber Rayne, Jerry, Tyler Knight - The 8th Day; Monique Alexander, Tee Reel, Alex Gonz, Lorena Sanchez - American Swingers; Jenny Hendrix, Steve Holmes, Jerry, Mr. Pete, Ass Worship 11; Olivier Sanchez, Jazz Duro, Denice K., Daphne Rosen, Amy Azurra - Ben Dover's Busty Babes U.S.A.; Jon Jon, Nat Turnher, Rico Strong, Tee Reel, Nathan Threat, Mr. Marcus, Cecilia Vega - The Brother Load; Michael Stefano, Bobbi Starr, Adrianna Nicole, Toni Ribas, Andi Anderson, Madison Parker - Evil Anal 10; Jade Starr, Alec Knight, James Deen, Marie Luv, Natalie Minx, Jayme Langford - Fuck The World; Dave Hardman, Pierce Johnson, Valentino, Otto Bauer, Audrey Hollander, Eddie Charisma, Jenner, Seth Dickens, Dirty Harry, Frankie Young, Jay Ashley, Steve James, Johnny Nitro, Eric Camden - Ganged and Banged; Manuel Ferrara, Sunny Lane, Ava Rose, Kristina Rose - Pornstar Workout; Rocco Siffredi, Bobbi Starr, Jamie Elle, Toni Ribas - Rocco Ravishes L.A.; Olivier Sanchez, Danny D., Bobbi Starr, George Uhl - Satan's Whore; Jackie Daniels, Charley Chase, Angelica Raven, Gracie Glam, Pike Nelson - The Sex Files: A Dark XXX Parody; Ben English, Anthony Rosano, Tori Black, Francesca Lé - TMSleaze
Best Couples Sex Scene	Best All-Girl Couples Sex Scene
**Amy Ried, Ralph Long − 30 Rock: A XXX Parody**; Jessica Drake, Marcus London − 2040; Justin Slayer, Sara Sloane − Booty I Like 5; Mick Blue, Tori Black − Don't Make Me Beg; Tom Byron, Lexi Belle − House of Ass 10; Jenna Haze, Prince Yahshua − Sexual Blacktivity; Scott Nails, Jesse Jane − Jesse Jane: Atomic Tease; Evan Stone, Kayden Kross − Kayden's Frisky Business; Tiffany Mynx, Lexington Steele − Lexington the Impaler 4; Alex Gonz, Andy San Dimas − On My Dirty Knees; Asa Akira, Keni Styles − Pure; Ashlynn Brooke, Evan Stone − Seinfeld: A XXX Parody; Tera Patrick, Spyder Jonez − Sex in Dangerous Places; Mark Ashley, Kagney Linn Karter − Swimsuit Calendar Girls 2; Sasha Grey, Evan Stone − Throat: A Cautionary Tale	**Tori Black, Lexi Belle − Field of Schemes 5**; Jenna Haze, Alexis Texas − Anal Academics; Sammie Rhodes, Kristina Rose − Bitchcraft 6; Sasha Grey, Bree Olson − Bree & Sasha; Lexi Belle, Jenna Haze − Evil Pink 4; Emy Reyes, Vanessa Leon − Girl on Girl 2; Cindy Hope, Anita Pearl − Intimate Contact 2; Zoe Britton, Nikki Rhodes − Lesbian Bridal Stories 4; Devi Emmerson, Molly Cavalli − Molly's Life 1; Monique Alexander, Tori Black − Nymphetamine 3; Aiden Starr, Evie Delatosso − Psycho Cheerleaders 2; Misty Stone, Sochee Mala − Pussy a Go Go; Courtney Cummz, Roxy Reynolds − Pussycats 3; Sunny Leone, Jenna Haze − Sunny's Slumber Party; Franziska Facella, Taylor Vixen − Women Seeking Women 55
Best Anal Sex Scene	Best Oral Sex Scene
**Sasha Grey, Erik Everhard − Anal Cavity Search 6**; Mick Blue, Bobbi Starr, Loona Luxx − Anal Buffet; James Deen, Ricki White − Ass Cleavage 10; Criss Strokes, Phoenix Marie − Ass Worship 11; Michael Stefano, Gianna Michaels − Big Wet Asses 15; Lexington Steele, Tory Lane − Breast Worship 2; Belladonna, James Deen − Butthole Whores 3; Mr. Pete, Kimberly Kane − Content; Scott Nails, Jenna Haze − Cum-Spoiled Sluts; Manuel Ferrara, Chayse Evans − Evil Anal 10; Manuel Ferrara, Marie Luv − Go Hard or Go Home; James Deen, Kristina Rose − Kristina Rose: Dirty Girl; Rocco Siffredi, Kristina Rose − Rocco Ravishes L.A.; Joanna Angel, James Deen, Alexis Texas − Scrubs: A XXX Parody; Manuel Ferrara, Tori Black − Tori Black Is Pretty Filthy	**Sasha Grey − Throat: A Cautionary Tale**; Hanna Hilton − Bounce; Sindee Jennings − Cummin' at You 3D; Alektra Blue − Educating Alli; Brittany O'Connell − Face Full of Diesel 6; Madison Ivy − Jules Jordan: Feeding Frenzy 10; Misty Stone, Lexi Love − Flight Attendants; Nikki Rhodes − Fuck The World; Nicole Ray − Gag Factor 29; Naomi Cruise -− Jerkoff Material; Brooke Banner − 70's Show: A XXX Parody; Coco Velvett, Andy San Dimas, Draven Star − L.A. Pink; Marie Luv − Belladonna's Oddjobs 4; Michelle Myers − Oral Assault
Crossover Star of the Year	Web Starlet of the Year
**Sasha Grey**	**Sunny Leone**; Angel Dark; Misty Anderson; Joanna Angel; Eva Angelina; Belladonna; Tori Black; Sophie Dee; Vanilla DeVille; Katsuni; Sunny Lane; Shay Lynn; Mariah Milano; Phoenix Marie; Regan Reese
Top Renting and Selling Release	**Sunny Leone**; Angel Dark; Misty Anderson; Joanna Angel; Eva Angelina; Belladonna; Tori Black; Sophie Dee; Vanilla DeVille; Katsuni; Sunny Lane; Shay Lynn; Mariah Milano; Phoenix Marie; Regan Reese
**Pirates II: Stagnetti's Revenge**	**Sunny Leone**; Angel Dark; Misty Anderson; Joanna Angel; Eva Angelina; Belladonna; Tori Black; Sophie Dee; Vanilla DeVille; Katsuni; Sunny Lane; Shay Lynn; Mariah Milano; Phoenix Marie; Regan Reese

=== Additional Award Winners ===
These awards were announced in a winners-only segment, but were not presented their awards on stage during the event and were not part of the televised awards show.

**DVD Categories**

- Best All-Girl Series: Women Seeking Women
- Best All-Sex Release: Evalutionary
- Best All-Sex Series: Addicted
- Best Alternative Release: Porn's Most Outrageous Outtakes 3
- Best Alternative Series: Naked College Coeds
- Best Amateur Release: 18 With Proof 2
- Best Amateur Series: Cherries
- Best Anal-Themed Release: Ass Worship 11
- Best Anal-Themed Series: Evil Anal
- Best Animated Release: PornoMation 3
- Best BDSM Release: Ivy Manor Slaves 3: The Dream Team
- Best Big Bust Release: Breast Worship 2
- Best Big Bust Series: Big Tits at School
- Best Big Butt Release: Big Wet Asses 15
- Best Big Butt Series: Big Wet Asses
- Best Classic Release: Debbie Does Dallas 30th Anniversary Edition
- Best DVD Extras: The 8th Day − Adam & Eve Pictures
- Best DVD Menus: 2040 − Wicked Pictures
- Best Educational Release: Tristan Taormino's Expert Guide to Threesomes
- Best Ethnic-Themed Release — Asian: Asian Fucking Nation 3
- Best Ethnic-Themed Release — Black: Phatty Girls 9
- Best Ethnic-Themed Release — Latin: Young Tight Latinas 17
- Best Ethnic-Themed Series — Asian: Cockasian
- Best Ethnic-Themed Series — Latin: Deep in Latin Cheeks
- Best Fem-Dom Strap-On Release: Forced Fem 3
- Best Foot/Leg Fetish Release: Party of Feet
- Best Foreign All-Sex Release: Bobbi Violates Europe − Evil Angel/Clark Euro Angel Video
- Best Foreign All-Sex Series: Rocco: Puppet Master − Evil Angel/Rocco Siffredi Productions
- Best Foreign Feature: Billionaire − Pure Play Media
- Best Gonzo Series: Jerkoff Material
- Best Interactive DVD: Interactive Sex With Tori Black
- Best Internal Release: All Internal 9
- Best Internal Series: Internal Damnation
- Best Interracial Release: Lex the Impaler 4
- Best Interracial Series: It's Big, It's Black, It's Jack
- Best MILF Release: It's a Mommy Thing! 4
- Best MILF Series: Seasoned Players
- Best New Line: Reality Junkies
- Best New Series: Glamour Girls
- Best New Video Production Company: Bluebird Films
- Best Online Marketing Campaign — Company Image: Sitcums.com – X-Play
- Best Online Marketing Campaign — Individual Project: The 8th Day, the8thdayxxx.com − Adam & Eve Pictures
- Best Oral-Themed Release: Feeding Frenzy 10
- Best Oral-Themed Series: Face Fucking Inc.
- Best Orgy/Gangbang Release: Young Harlots: Gangbang
- Best Orgy/Gangbang Series: Gangland
- Best Overall Marketing Campaign — Company Image: Vivid Entertainment and Digital Playground (tie)
- Best Overall Marketing Campaign — Individual Project: Throat: A Cautionary Tale, Vivid Entertainment Group
- Best Packaging: Operation: Tropical Stormy − Wicked Pictures
- Best Packaging Innovation: The 8th Day − Adam & Eve Pictures
- Best POV Release: Anal Prostitutes on Video 6
- Best POV Series: Jack's POV
- Best Pro-Am Release: Bang Bus 24
- Best Pro-Am Series: Brand New Faces
- Best Solo Release: All Alone 4
- Best Special Effects: The 8th Day
- Best Specialty Release — Other Genre: Asses of Face Destruction 5
- Best Specialty Series: Fishnets
- Best Squirting Release: Squirt Gangbang 4
- Best Squirting Series: Storm Squirters
- Best Transsexual Release: Rogue Adventures 33
- Best Transsexual Series: America's Next Top Tranny
- Best Vignette Release: Nurses
- Best Vignette Series: Penthouse Variations
- Best Young Girl Release: Young & Glamorous
- Best Young Girl Series: Barely Legal
- Clever Title of the Year: Who's Nailin' Paylin?

**Performer/Creator Categories**

- Best All-Girl Group Sex Scene: Eva Angelina, Teagan Presley, Sunny Leone, Alexis Texas − Deviance
- Best All-Girl Three-Way Sex Scene: Bree Olson, Tori Black, Poppy Morgan − The 8th Day
- Best Art Direction: 2040
- Best Director — Ethnic Video: Jules Jordan − Lex the Impaler 4
- Best Director — Foreign Feature: (tie) Moire Candy (Louis Moire/Max Candy) (Ritual) & Paul Chaplin (Black Beauty: Escape to Eden − Bluebird Films)
- Best Director — Foreign Non-Feature: Raul Cristian (Ass Traffic 6 − Evil Angel)
- Best Director — Non Feature: William H., Evalutionary
- Best Double Penetration Sex Scene: Bobbi Starr, Mr. Marcus, Sean Michaels − Bobbi Starr & Dana DeArmond's Insatiable Voyage
- Best Editing: Ren Savant, The 8th Day
- Best Makeup: Christi Belden, Lisa Berczel, Leonard Berczel, Nicki Hunter, Julia Ann, The 8th Day
- Best Male Newcomer: Dane Cross
- Best Music Soundtrack: Live in My Secrets
- Best Non-Sex Performance: Thomas Ward, Not the Cosbys XXX
- Best Original Song: “Bree's Bossa” by Joe Gallant − The Crack Pack
- Best POV Sex Scene: Kagney Linn Karter, Pound the Round POV
- Best Screenplay: Raven Touchstone − Throat: A Cautionary Tale
- Best Sex Scene in a Foreign-Shot Production: Aletta Ocean, Olivier Sanchez, George Uhl (Dollz House − Harmony Films)
- Best Solo Sex Scene: Teagan Presley, Not the Bradys XXX: Marcia, Marcia, Marcia!
- Best Supporting Actor: Tom Byron, Throat: A Cautionary Tale
- Best Supporting Actress: Penny Flame, Throat: A Cautionary Tale
- Best Tease Performance: Tori Black, Tori Black Is Pretty Filthy
- Best Three-Way Sex Scene: Tori Black, Rebeca Linares, Mark Ashley, Tori Black Is Pretty Filthy
- Best Videography/Cinematography: Monmarquis, David Lord, Ren Savant, The 8th Day
- Director of the Year (Body of Work): Will Ryder
- Female Foreign Performer of the Year: Aletta Ocean
- Male Foreign Performer of the Year: Toni Ribas
- MILF/Cougar Performer of the Year: Julia Ann
- Most Outrageous Sex Scene: Bobbi Starr in “Go Fuck Yourself” from Belladonna: No Warning 4
- Transsexual Performer of the Year: Kimber James
- Unsung Male Performer of the Year: Derrick Pierce
- Unsung Starlet of the Year: Shawna Lenee

**Web and Technology Categories**

- Best Adult Website: BangBros.com − Bang Productions
- Best New Web Starlet: Lexi Belle
- Best Retail Website: AdultDVDEmpire.com

== Honorary AVN Awards ==
=== Hall of Fame ===
AVN Hall of Fame inductees for 2010 were: Chris Charming, Stoney Curtis, Racquel Devine, Devon, Jessica Drake, Byron Long, Gina Lynn, Toni Ribas, Nicholas Steele, Michael Stefano, Valentino, Mark Wood

- Founders Branch: Christian Mann, Catalina Video; Michael Paulsen, Paradise Visuals; Michael Warner, Great Western Litho
- Internet Founders Branch: Ron Cadwell, CCBill; Tony Morgan, National Net; Morgan Sommer, Cybersocket

== Multiple nominations and awards ==
The following releases received multiple awards:

- 9 awards: The 8th Day
- 5 awards: Throat: A Cautionary Tale
- 3 awards: Tori Black Is Pretty Filthy, 2040
- 2 awards: Evalutionary, Lex the Impaler 4, Not the Cosbys XXX, The Sex Files: A Dark XXX Parody

The following releases received the most nominations:

- 20 nominations: The 8th Day
- 18 nominations: 2040
- 16 nominations: The Sex Files: A Dark XXX Parody
- 13 nominations: Throat: A Cautionary Tale, Pure
- 11 nominations: Flight Attendants
- 10 nominations: Seinfeld: A XXX Parody, Fuck The World

The following individuals received multiple awards:

- 6 awards: Tori Black
- 3 awards: Sasha Grey
- 2 awards: Lexi Belle, Julia Ann, Kagney Linn Karter, Sunny Leone, Aletta Ocean, Teagan Presley, Ren Savant, Bobbi Starr

== Presenters and performers ==
The following individuals were presenters or performers during the awards ceremony.

=== Presenters ===
Presenters (in order of appearance)

Name(s)	Role
Erik Everhard; Kelli McCarty; Shauna Sand-Lamas	Presenters of the award for Best Oral Sex Scene
Dana DeArmond; Angelina Valentine; Asa Akira	Presenters of the award for Best Group Sex Scene
Shawna Lenee; Lexi Belle; Riley Steele	Presenters of the awards for Best Actor and Best Gonzo Release
Eva Angelina; Aryanna Starr; Ashlynn Brooke	Presenters of the award for Best Anal Sex Scene
Wendy Williams; Nick Manning; Margaret Cho	Presenters of the award for Male Performer of the Year
Nikki Rhodes; Kristina Rose; Savanna Samson	Presenters of the award for Web Starlet of the Year
Alexis Ford; Janie Summers; Sara Sloane	Trophy girls
Stormy Daniels; Rocco Siffredi	Presenter of the Best New Starlet award
Dave Navarro	Presenter of the Crossover Star of the Year award
Teagan Presley; Mick Blue; Alektra Blue	Presenters of the award for Best All-Girl Couples Sex Scene
Jenna Haze; Bobbi Starr; Lexington Steele	Presenters of the award for Best Actress and Best Parody
Erica Ellyson; Joanna Angel; Evan Stone	Presenters of the award for Female Performer of the Year
Kayden Kross; Kirsten Price	Introduced the performance by Baby Bash
Jesse Jane; Mr. Pete; A. J. Bailey	Presenters of the award for Best Video Feature

=== Trophy girls ===
Trophy girls
- Alexis Ford
- Janie Summers
- Sara Sloane

=== Performers ===
Performers

Name(s)	Role	Performed
Baby Bash	Performer	Rap group performs "Outta Control"
Belladonna	Performer	Dance troupe
DJ Shy	Performer	Turntable stylings
McKenzie Lee	Backstage	Interviews

== Changes to awards categories ==
Beginning with the 27th AVN Awards, AVN Media Network added a category to the awards show titled Best Sex Parody. "Because of the amount of quality parodies that studios have produced in the past year and the impact they've had on the marketplace, we've decided to honor the best of those movies in their own category separate from our long-running Best Sex Comedy award", said Paul Fishbein, president of AVN.

== See also ==
- AVN Award for Male Performer of the Year
- AVN Female Performer of the Year Award
- AVN Award for Male Foreign Performer of the Year
- List of members of the AVN Hall of Fame

== Other sources ==
- Gary Miller (director) (2010). The 2010 AVN Awards Show (Television production). Los Angeles, California: Showtime Networks.
