= Mason (director) =

American film director

- Born: Los Angeles, California, U.S.
- Other name: Sam No

Mason, also known as Sam No, is an American pornographic film director.

== Early life ==
Mason was born in Los Angeles, California and spent some time in Seattle, Washington during her youth. She earned a degree in political science prior to working in the adult film industry.

== Career ==
Mason met Rodney Moore at a convention and began working for him as a camera operator and film editor. She later worked for Andre Madness, who put her in touch with Elegant Angel. She worked as a director for Elegant Angel until February 2003 when she left the company due to changes in management. In April of that year, she signed an exclusive directing contract with the studio Platinum X. Her first film for Platinum X, Mason’s Sexual Disorder, was released on October 14, 2003. In February 2005, she was released from her contract with Platinum X for not filming enough movies. The following month, she signed a one-year exclusive 12-picture directing deal with Hustler Video. She only directed one film for Hustler before leaving in June 2005 because the company's creative vision was heading in a different direction than previously planned. In September 2007, she began directing for Elegant Angel again. In July 2013, she became an exclusive director for OpenLife Entertainment. The following month, OpenLife Entertainment launched two studios, EroticaX and HardX, both helmed by Mason. In November 2015, O.L. Entertainment launched Dark X, an interracial pornography studio which is also helmed by Mason. In 2015, Mason became the first female to win the AVN Award for Director of the Year.

== Awards and nominations ==
List of accolades received by Mason
Awards & nominations
Award	Won	Nominated
AFW Awards	1	0
AVN Awards	5	20
NightMoves Awards	1	0
TLARaw Awards	1	0
Urban X Awards	1	0
XBIZ Awards	2	7
XCritic.com Fans Choice Awards	1	0
XRCO Awards	2	5
- Total number of wins and nominations
Totals	14	32
- References

Year	Ceremony	Result	Category	Work
2003	AFW Award	Won	Directrix of the Year	—N/a
2003	AVN Award	Nominated	Best Director – Non-Feature	Lady Fellatio in the Doghouse
2003	AVN Award	Nominated	Best Oral Sex Scene – Video (shared with Olivia Saint, Gino Greco & Kyle Stone)	Lady Fellatio 2: Desperately Seeking Semen
2003	AVN Award	Nominated	Best Group Sex Scene – Video (shared with Alexandra Quinn, Gino Greco & William H.)	Lady Fellatio 2: Desperately Seeking Semen
2003	XRCO Award	Nominated	Director of the Year	—N/a
2004	AVN Award	Nominated	Best Director – Non Feature	Mason's Dirty Trixxx 2
2005	AVN Award	Nominated	Best Director – Non-Feature	Mason's Sexual Disorder
2006	AVN Award	Nominated	Best Director – Non-Feature	Riot Sluts 2
2008	AVN Award	Nominated	Best Director, Non-Feature (shared with William H.)	Brianna Love Is Buttwoman
2009	AVN Award	Nominated	Best Director – Non-Feature	Slave Dolls 3
2010	AVN Award	Nominated	Best Director, Non-Feature	Tori Black Is Pretty Filthy
2010	AVN Award	Nominated	Best Videography	Tori Black Is Pretty Filthy
2010	AVN Award	Nominated	Director of the Year (Body of Work)	—N/a
2010	XBIZ Award	Nominated	Director of the Year — Body of Work	—N/a
2010	XRCO Award	Nominated	Best Director (Non-Features)	—N/a
2011	AVN Award	Nominated	Best Director – Non-Feature	Buttwoman vs. Slutwoman
2011	AVN Award	Nominated	Director of the Year (Body of Work)	—N/a
2011	XBIZ Award	Nominated	Director of the Year - Body of Work	—N/a
2011	XRCO Award	Nominated	Best Director - Non-Features	—N/a
2012	AVN Award	Nominated	Best Cinematography (shared with Carlos Dee & Alex Ladd)	Portrait of a Call Girl
2012	AVN Award	Won	Best Director – Non Feature	Asa Akira Is Insatiable 2
2012	AVN Award	Nominated	Director of the Year (Body of Work)	—N/a
2012	Urban X Award	Won	Best Director: Gonzo	Asa Akira Is Insatiable 2
2012	XBIZ Award	Won	Best Cinematography (shared with Carlos Dee & Alex Ladd)	Portrait of a Call Girl
2012	XRCO Award	Nominated	Best Director – Non-Features	—N/a
2013	AVN Award	Won	Best Cinematography (shared with Alex Ladd & Carlos D.)	Wasteland
2013	AVN Award	Nominated	Best Director – Non-Feature	Dani Daniels Dare
2013	AVN Award	Nominated	Director of the Year (Body of Work)	—N/a
2013	XBIZ Award	Nominated	Director of the Year - Body of Work	—N/a
2013	XBIZ Award	Won	Director of the Year - Non-Feature Release	Lexi
2013	XBIZ Award	Nominated	Best Cinematography (shared with Alex Ladd & Carlos Dee)	Wasteland
2013	XCritic.com Fans Choice Award	Won	Best Director: Non-Feature	Jada Stevens Is Buttwoman
2013	XRCO Award	Nominated	Best Director (Non-Features)	—N/a
2014	AVN Award	Nominated	Best Cinematography (shared with Alex Ladd)	Eternal Passion
2014	AVN Award	Won	Best Director – Non-Feature	Anikka
2014	AVN Award	Nominated	Director of the Year	—N/a
2014	NightMoves Award	Won	Best Director — Non-Feature (Editor's Choice)	—N/a
2014	TLARaw Award	Won	Best Director	—N/a
2014	XBIZ Award	Nominated	Director of the Year - Non-Feature Release	Anikka
2014	XRCO Award	Won	Best Director (Non-Features)	—N/a
2015	AVN Award	Nominated	Best Cinematography	Allie
2015	AVN Award	Won	Best Director – Non-Feature	Allie
2015	AVN Award	Won	Director of the Year	—N/a
2015	XBIZ Award	Nominated	Director of the Year - Body of Work	—N/a
2015	XBIZ Award	Nominated	Director of the Year - Non-Feature Release	Allie
2015	XRCO Award	Won	Best Director (Non-Features)	—N/a
