= 30 Rock: A XXX Parody =

- DVD cover
- Directed by: Lee Roy Myers
- Written by: Lee Roy Myers
- Starring: Amy Ried; Ashlynn Brooke; Chris Cannon; Erik Everhard; Evie Delatosso; Herschel Savage; James Deen; Lana Violet; Lisa Ann; Ralph Long; Rebeca Linares; Bishop; Mia Lelani; Trisha Rey
- Edited by: Eddie Powell
- Distributed by: New Sensations
- Release date: August 24, 2009
- Running time: 105 minutes
- Language: English

30 Rock: A XXX Parody is an American pornographic film released on August 24, 2009. It parodies the television comedy series 30 Rock. The film was directed by Lee Roy Myers and produced by the company New Sensations, who had also created parodies such as Scrubs: A XXX Parody and Seinfeld: A XXX Parody. Lisa Ann, who parodied Sarah Palin in Who's Nailin' Paylin?, stars as Liz Lemon, the character originally played by Tina Fey, who parodied Palin herself on Saturday Night Live.

The film is based on a sketch comedy television show, TCS with Trey Jordan, whose ratings head writer Liz Limon (Lisa Ann) has to boost by adding more sex to. The film's five sex scenes include a scene between network executive Jake (Herschel Savage) and assistant Karina (Evie Delatosso), and actress Jenny (Ashlynn Brooke) having sex with a writer before she cons him creating a sketch for her. The film ends with a sex tape of Limon and boyfriend Danny (James Deen) accidentally being aired on the show.

A review by Adult Video News called the film a "blandly-written and at times just plain boring comedy", but praised the acting by Bishop, Ashlynn Brooke and Paul Woodcrest. Remarking on Lisa Ann's performance, compared with her success in Who's Nailin' Paylin?, the review stated "sadly, Lisa's funnier trying to be serious than she is when trying to be funny". An XBIZ review stated that the "main players are really good" and that the character Trey Jordan (Bishop) is "hilarious". New York magazine commented "it's actually disturbing how true to the show this thing is ... Someone out there in porn-making land has actually done their 30 Rock homework".

Commenting on her character, Ashlynn Brooke stated "My personality is kind of close to hers, humor-wise". Lisa Ann remarked "I’m a huge Tina Fey fan, so playing her in 30 Rock was incredible ... These roles have been the most fun I've had in my career, and I can’t wait to see what’s next!".

== Cast ==
- Amy Ried as Cherry
- Ashlynn Brooke as Jenny
- Chris Cannon as Fred
- Paul Woodcrest as Ken
- Erik Everhard as Ken body double for sex scenes
- Evie Delatosso as Alicia
- Herschel Savage as Jake
- James Deen as Danny
- Lana Violet as Nancy
- Lisa Ann as Limon
- Ralph Long as Peter
- Rebeca Linares as Stephanie
- Bishop as Trey Jordan

== Awards ==
Wins

- 2010 AVN Award – Best Couples Sex Scene (Amy Ried and Ralph Long)

Nominations

- 2010 AVN Award – Best Actor (Herschel Savage)
- 2010 AVN Award – Best Supporting Actress (Ashlynn Brooke)
- 2010 AVN Award – Best Non-Sex Performance (Bishop)
- 2010 AVN Award – Best Non-Sex Performance (Paul Woodcrest)
- 2010 AVN Award – Best Threeway Sex Scene (Lana Violet, Rebeca Linares and Erik Everhard)
- 2010 AVN Award – Best Makeup (Maria and Glenn Alfonso)
- 2010 AVN Award – Best On-Line Marketing Campaign, Individual Project
- 2010 AVN Award – Best Sex Parody
- 2010 XBIZ Award – Director of the Year, Individual Project (Lee Roy Myers)
- 2010 XBIZ Award – Acting Performance of the Year, Male (Herschel Savage)
- 2010 XBIZ Award – Marketing Campaign of the Year
- 2010 XBIZ Award – Parody Release of the Year
