= Asa Akira =

American pornographic actress (born 1985)

- Akira in 2016
- Born: 1984 or 1985 (age 41–42); New York City, U.S.
- Occupations: Actress; writer; director
- Years active: 2006–present
- Spouse: Toni Ribas (m. 2012; div. 2017)
- Website: asaakira.com

Asa Akira (born 1984 or 1985) is an American pornographic film actress, writer and adult film director. Akira has appeared in 689 adult films as of June 2023. In 2013, she became the third Asian performer (after Asia Carrera and Stephanie Swift) to win the AVN Female Performer of the Year Award. Akira hosted the 1st and 2nd ceremonies for the Pornhub Awards. She was inducted into the AVN Hall of Fame, XRCO Hall of Fame, Urban X Hall of Fame, and Brazzers Hall of Fame.

== Early life ==
A native of Manhattan, New York, Akira grew up in an upper middle-class family and attended private schools in New York and Japan. She lived in Tokyo for four years before moving back to the United States in her teens.

Before and after moving back to Manhattan, Asa grew up in Manhattan's SoHo neighborhood.

Asa is her real first name, which means "morning" in Japanese. Her professional surname was taken from the anime film Akira.

== Career ==
=== Pornographic career ===
Akira began working as a dominatrix when she was 19 years old. She later worked as a stripper at the Hustler Club in New York. In 2006–2007 she was a regular on the Bubba the Love Sponge radio show and was known as the "Show Whore". Her first boy-girl scene was with Travis Knight for Gina Lynn Productions, after having already done several girl-girl scenes, mainly with Lynn. She then signed a contract with Vouyer Media before becoming a freelancer six months later.

Akira received several award nominations for her role in David Aaron Clark's 2009 film, Pure, in which she plays a telephonist at a fetish dungeon who has an affair with the head-mistress' husband.

Akira co-hosted the 30th Annual AVN Awards alongside pornographic actress Jesse Jane and comedian April Macie. She won the AVN Female Performer of the Year Award that night. She was also the most awarded person during that ceremony.

In 2013, she made her directorial debut with Elegant Angel's Gangbanged 6.

On October 9, 2013, Akira announced that she signed an exclusive performing contract with Wicked Pictures. Her debut film as a contract performer for the company was Asa Is Wicked.

=== Mainstream media appearances ===
In January 2014, Akira, Dana DeArmond, Chanel Preston, and Jessie Andrews were featured in a Cosmopolitan magazine article titled "4 Porn Stars on How They Stay Fit." The article was inspired by actress Gabrielle Union's comment made on Conan O'Brien's talk show about striving to follow the fitness routines of the porn stars she saw at her gym.

In 2014, Akira was a guest interviewee on the season 3 premiere of the surrealist talk show The Eric Andre Show.

In 2017, Akira appeared as herself in the first episode of the sixteenth season of Family Guy in a live-action casting couch cutaway scene with Peter Griffin. Akira later noted that, ironically, this was her first casting couch scene. The episode featured a recurring joke of people asking Peter "who was the girl on the couch" and Peter giving a deadpan reply that he is certain each inquirer already knows who she is. In the eighth episode of the twentieth season after Peter is fired from his job, he tries to clear his browser history, but it is too late as the company IT guy notes that Peter is "all in" on Akira.

=== Other media ===
In 2011, Complex ranked Akira fourth on their list of "The Top 100 Hottest Porn Stars Right Now" and at sixth on their list of "The Top 50 Hottest Asian Porn Stars of All Time". LA Weekly ranked her third on their list of "10 Innovative Porn Stars Who Could Be the Next Sasha Grey" in 2013. She was also placed on CNBC's yearly list "The Dirty Dozen", the site's annual ranking of the adult industry's most popular and successful stars in 2012, 2013, 2014, and 2015.

In 2013 Akira and artist David Choe started a podcast featuring 90-minute episodes called DVDASA. It is aimed at a young adult audience, with its goal being to help youth with their problems related to sexuality, career, relationships, etc.

In June 2014, Akira appeared on a YouTube video with vlogger Caspar Lee.

Akira wrote a memoir titled Insatiable: Porn—A Love Story which was released in May 2014 by Grove Press. In July 2015, she signed a contract with Cleis Press to publish her second book, titled Dirty Thirty: A Memoir, a collection of essays, which was released in the fall of 2016.

On April 6, 2015, The Hundreds started releasing episodes for a series titled Hobbies with Asa Akira, which features Akira trying out different activities such as tattooing, boxing, taxidermy, and ice sculpting.

Akira was the host of The Sex Factor, a 2016 online reality show where eight men and eight women competed for a $1 million prize.

== Personal life ==
Akira states that she is sexually attracted to both men and "girls that look like boys". She dislikes being called bisexual, saying that she leans towards heterosexuality, but is still uncertain. She was once engaged to former pornographic actor Rocco Reed. She was also married to pornographic actor and director Toni Ribas, and she stated that aside from their on-screen work, their relationship was monogamous.

Akira identifies as a feminist.

== Awards ==
List of accolades received by Asa Akira
Awards
Award	Won
AVN Awards	21
NightMoves Awards	5
Pornhub Awards	3
Urban X Awards	4
XBIZ Awards	3
XRCO Awards	5
Others	7
- Total number of wins
Totals	48
- References

Year	Ceremony	Category	Work
2011	AVN Award	Best All-Girl Three-Way Sex Scene (with Alexis Texas & Kristina Rose)	Buttwoman vs. Slutwoman
2011	AVN Award	Best Anal Sex Scene (with Manuel Ferrara)	Asa Akira Is Insatiable
2011	AVN Award	Best Double Penetration Sex Scene (with Toni Ribas & Erik Everhard)	Asa Akira Is Insatiable
2011	AVN Award	Best Three-Way Sex Scene (G/B/B) (with Prince Yahshua & Jon Jon)	Asa Akira Is Insatiable
2011	Urban X Award	Best Couple Sex Scene (with Mr. Pete)	Vajazzled
2011	Urban X Award	Porn Star of the Year	—N/a
2012	AVN Award	Best Solo Sex Scene	Superstar Showdown 2: Asa Akira vs. Kristina Rose
2012	AVN Award	Best Anal Sex Scene (with Nacho Vidal)	Asa Akira Is Insatiable 2
2012	AVN Award	Best Double-Penetration Scene (with Mick Blue & Toni Ribas)	Asa Akira Is Insatiable 2
2012	AVN Award	Best Group Sex Scene (with Erik Everhard, Toni Ribas, Danny Mountain, Jon Jon, Broc Adams, Ramón Nomar, & John Strong)	Asa Akira Is Insatiable 2
2012	AVN Award	Best Tease Performance	Asa Akira Is Insatiable 2
2012	AVN Award	Best Three-Way Sex Scene, Boy/Boy/Girl (with Mick Blue & Toni Ribas)	Asa Akira Is Insatiable 2
2012	NightMoves Award	Best Gonzo/All Sex Release (Fan's Choice)	Asa Akira Is Insatiable 2
2012	NightMoves Award	Best Ass (Editor's Choice)	—N/a
2012	XBIZ Award	Female Performer of the Year	—N/a
2012	XRCO Award	Female Performer of the Year	—N/a
2012	XRCO Award	Superslut	—N/a
2012	AEBN VOD Award	Performer of The Year	—N/a
2012	Galaxy Award	Best Personal Website (North America)	AsaAkira.com
2013	Sex Award	Porn Star of the Year	—N/a
2013	Sex Award	Porn's Perfect Girl/Girl Screen Couple (with Jessica Drake)	—N/a
2013	Sex Award	Adult Movie of the Year	Asa Akira Is Insatiable 3
2013	AVN Award	Best Double-Penetration Sex Scene (with Ramón Nomar & Mick Blue)	Asa Akira Is Insatiable 3
2013	AVN Award	Best Group Sex Scene (with Erik Everhard, Ramón Nomar, & Mick Blue)	Asa Akira Is Insatiable 3
2013	AVN Award	Best Three-Way Sex Scene (Girl/Girl/Boy) (with Brooklyn Lee & James Deen)	Asa Akira Is Insatiable 3
2013	AVN Award	Best POV Sex Scene (with Jules Jordan)	Asa Akira to the Limit
2013	AVN Award	Best Star Showcase	Asa Akira to the Limit
2013	AVN Award	Female Performer of the Year	—N/a
2013	XRCO Award	Female Performer of the Year	—N/a
2013	NightMoves Award	Best Ethnic Performer (Fan's Choice)	—N/a
2013	Galaxy Award	Best Female Performer (America)	—N/a
2014	AVN Award	Best Porn Star Website (tied with JoannaAngel.com)	AsaAkira.com
2014	NightMoves Award	Best Body (Editor's Choice)	—N/a
2014	NightMoves Award	Best All-Girl Release (Editor's Choice)	Alexis & Asa
2015	XRCO Award	Mainstream Adult Media Favorite	—N/a
2017	AVN Award	Best Solo/Tease Performance	Asa Goes To Hell
2017	XBIZ Award	Best Supporting Actress	DNA
2017	Urban X Award	Social Media Star of the Year	—N/a
2017	Urban X Award	Hall of Fame	—N/a
2018	AVN Award	Mainstream Star of the Year	—N/a
2018	XBIZ Award	Best Actress – Couples-Themed Release	The Blonde Dahlia
2019	AVN Award	Mainstream Venture of the Year	—N/a
2019	AVN Award	Hall of Fame	—N/a
2019	Pornhub Award	Best Fan Club	—N/a
2020	XRCO Award	Hall of Fame	—N/a
2020	Pornhub Award	Favorite MILF	—N/a
2022	Pornhub Award	Favorite Social Media Personality	—N/a
2023	Brazzers	Hall of Fame	—N/a

== Publications ==
- Akira, Asa (2014). Insatiable: Porn—A Love Story. Grove Press. ISBN 978-0-8021-2259-9.
- Akira, Asa (2016). Dirty Thirty: A Memoir. Cleis Press. ISBN 978-1-62778-164-0.
- Akira, Asa, ed. (2017). Asarotica. Cleis Press. ISBN 978-1-62778-226-5.
