= A Wet Dream on Elm Street =

2011 film by Lee Roy Myers

- DVD released by Tom Byron Pictures
- Directed by: Lee Roy Myers
- Written by: Lee Roy Myers
- Based on: A Nightmare on Elm Street by Wes Craven
- Starring: Sophie Dee; Gracie Glam; Giselle Leon; Tommy Pistol; Jennifer White; Chris Johnson; Charley Chase; Anthony Rosano
- Cinematography: Paul Woodcrest
- Edited by: Lee Roy Myers; George Christos
- Production company: Tom Byron Pictures
- Distributed by: Tom Byron Pictures; Evolution Distribution
- Release date: September 29, 2011 (United States)
- Running time: 106 minutes
- Country: United States
- Language: English

A Wet Dream on Elm Street is a 2011 pornographic slasher comedy film written and directed by Lee Roy Myers, as a parody of the 1984 film A Nightmare on Elm Street. In the film parody, the Freddy Krueger character has vibrators attached to his fingers, and places women into "pleasure comas" after giving them orgasms. Myers produced the film with Tom Byron Pictures; Tom Byron and Myers had previously collaborated on the film The Human Sexipede. It was released to DVD format on September 29, 2011.

A Wet Dream on Elm Street was recognized at the 2012 AVN Awards with three nominations, in the categories: Best Director - Parody, Best Makeup, and Best Solo Sex Scene. It received three nominations at the 2012 XBIZ Awards; for Parody Release of the Year, Director of the Year, and Screenplay of the Year. Sociologist and academic Chauntelle Tibbals placed the film at the top of her list of "The 10 Best Porn Films Since 2010". Tibbals called the film "high hilarity" and "comedic genius". Vince Mancini of Uproxx called it "a pretty good parody", and better than parody films by Jason Friedberg and Aaron Seltzer. WhatCulture highlighted the film among, "10 Ridiculous Horror Movie Porn Parodies You Won't Believe". Bustle recommended the film among, "6 NSFW Horror-Themed Films". The film was discussed in the genre of comedy horror porn, in books Torture Porn: Popular Horror after Saw, and Horror Film: A Critical Introduction.

== Plot ==
After having sex with her boyfriend, a woman is shocked when he transforms into Freddy Krueger, who she mistakes for Edward James Olmos. Freddy seduces the woman with his glove, which has vibrators affixed to the fingers.

At the second annual Elm Street High School reunion, three women discuss how all their classmates have mysteriously died. The sex ed professor appears and corrects them, explaining that their classmates fell into orgasm-induced "pleasure comas" while they slept. The professor theorizes it is the work of Freddy, a sex toy salesman who sold overpriced and shoddy merchandise. Angered by Freddy's defective products, the townspeople set him on fire, with the professor throwing the first match ("That guy sold me a crappy toy. Told me it was a Fleshlight. It turned out just to be a flashlight"). Freddy burnt from the waist up, and as he died he swore he would get his revenge on his killers through their children. The professor is dumbfounded by the girls failing to remember this (they witnessed Freddy's burning, and attended the block party celebrating the event) and warns them not to fall asleep.

At home, Betty tries to keep herself awake by watching the porno Dead Man Fucking, but the video turns into one showing Freddy having sex with a female guard in a prison cell. When Freddy finishes with the guard, he attacks Betty, but she wakes up. At the school, Betty tells the others about her nightmare, and the professor admits he once had a dream about Freddy ("It's not gay") where he saw Freddy's glove long enough to allow him to create a replica of it. Thinking the copy can help them find Freddy's weakness, the professor gives the glove to Kami. Kami masturbates into unconsciousness with the glove, and is rendered comatose by Freddy.

While the professor takes Kami to a hospital and Betty goes home, Denise stays behind ("If I learned anything from horror movies, it's that the psychotic fictional horror villain never goes for the hot girl in a room that's dark when she's all alone and most vulnerable"). Hearing noises coming from her old textbook, Denise flips through the book, and sees herself and the professor having sex in them. Denise is transported into the book, and when she and the professor finish fornicating, the professor turns into Freddy, and he puts Denise into a coma.

Fed up with living in fear, Betty goes to sleep, and confronts Freddy in her dream. The two have sex, and when Freddy tries to put her into a coma afterward, Betty reveals she stole his glove's batteries ("Now all you have to turn those girls on is that burnt face, and that 1980s sweater"). With Freddy robbed of his power, Betty wakes up, wonders if it was all just a dream, and discovers her underwear is soaked through.

== Cast ==
- Jennifer White as Adam's Girlfriend
- Chris Johnson as Adam
- Giselle Leon as Prison Guard
- Anthony Rosano as Freddy Krueger
- Gracie Glam as Kami
- Charley Chase as Denise
- Tommy Pistol as Professor
- Sophie Dee as Betty
- Lee Roy Myers as Sex Toy Customer
- Seth's Beard as Sex Toy Customer
- Freddy Fingers as Sex Toy Customer

== Production ==
A Wet Dream on Elm Street was written as a parody of the 1984 horror film A Nightmare on Elm Street. It was produced by Tom Byron Pictures. Lee Roy Myers both wrote and directed A Wet Dream on Elm Street. Myers stated he was inspired to parody films which already had a cult following. Choice of the film's title was important to Myers; he stated selecting a name for his films was incorporated as part of an attempt to go viral online. Tom Byron and Myers had previously worked together during production of their prior 2010 film, The Human Sexipede. During production on the film in 2011, Myers was recognized by the XBIZ Awards with Director of the Year for his body of work. Myers intended the film to be, "funny, sexy, dark and very, very different". They cast actors in the film including Anthony Rosano as "Freddy Fingers", along with cast members Jennifer White, Chris Johnson, Chad Alva, Mishka, Charley Chase, Gracie Glam, and Sophie Dee. Filming on the production started in June 2011. Myers stated his goal with the film within its genre was to "carefully balance sex and horror to create one hell of a parody".

== Release ==
A Wet Dream on Elm Street was released in DVD format on September 29, 2011. It was promoted via safe-for-work production photos and a movie trailer. The release date was intended to be in time for the Halloween season. DVDs saw increased sales during Halloween that year; they were distributed by company Evolution Distribution. The film's release led to increased industry connections for Myers; adult film star Vuko became interested in his work and the two subsequently collaborated on a film script for a parody of Venom.

== Reception ==
A Wet Dream on Elm Street received nominations for Best Director - Parody, Best Makeup, and Best Solo Scene at the 2012 AVN Awards. It additionally received three nominations at the 2012 XBIZ Awards; for Parody Release of the Year – Comedy, Director of the Year – Individual Project, and Screenplay of the Year.

Sociologist and academic Chauntelle Tibbals reviewed A Wet Dream on Elm Street for Uproxx, and placed it at the top of her list of "The 10 Best Porn Films Since 2010". Tibbals wrote, "A Wet Dream on Elm Street (2011) is high hilarity, complete with spectacular dialogue, clever cultural nods, and general silliness that will have you in tears." She concluded the film was, "comedic genius". Vince Mancini gave a separate review for Uproxx, commenting, "it's actually a pretty good parody". He wrote that it was better than films by Jason Friedberg and Aaron Seltzer. WhatCulture placed the film at number nine on its list, "10 Ridiculous Horror Movie Porn Parodies You Won't Believe". WhatCulture commented, "Luckily, whoever was in charge of plotting this thing changed Freddy from a kid’s school caretaker to a sex toy salesman and aged up his victims out of their teens. Sensible." Another article in WhatCulture by Simon Gallagher criticized the writing of the film's script, "it manages to actually entertain without a story, proving that the adaptation could have scored a win without trying so hard to be mainstream." Kristen Sollee of Bustle recommended the film, along with Dracula Sucks and The Texas Vibrator Massacre, on a list of "6 NSFW Horror-Themed Films". Sollee commented of the film's genre, "Given how central sex is to the horror genre, it's only fitting that horror become central to the porn genre." Sollee wrote that the film was, a "spoof that brings all your Freddy Kruger fantasies to life". The film received a positive reception from BuzzFeed, and Dread Central. Steve Barton of Dread Central commented, "You know, we usually don't cover things like this, but sometimes stuff comes our way that's just too goofy to ignore." Rafael Calderon of the Spanish language review site Cineralia placed A Wet Dream on Elm Street among, "The 5 best horror movie porn parodies". Cameron Terry wrote for BlackBook that the film was "amazingly titled".

Writing in his book Torture Porn: Popular Horror after Saw, author Steve Jones placed the film within the genre of comedy horror. He compared the film to similar works within the genre including Re-Penetrator, XXXorcist, and Camp Cuddly Pines Powertool Massacre. Jones wrote that the three-genre combination of comedy, porn, and horror, worked well together. Writing in Horror Film: A Critical Introduction, author Murray Leeder placed the film within the category of pornographic films that were influenced by previous horror movies. He compared the film to others within the genre including The Bare Wench Project and Porn of the Dead. Leeder wrote, "These spoofs work much like mainstream genre mixing in attempting to appeal to multiple audiences simultaneously."

== Awards and nominations ==
Year	Ceremony	Category	Recipient(s)	Result	Notes
2012	AVN Awards	Best Director - Parody	Lee Roy Myers	Nominated	
2012	AVN Awards	Best Makeup	Glen Alfonso, Tom Devlin	Nominated	
2012	AVN Awards	Best Solo Sex Scene	Gracie Glam	Nominated	
2012	XBIZ Awards	Parody Release of the Year – Comedy	Lee Roy Myers	Nominated	
2012	XBIZ Awards	Director of the Year – Individual Project	Lee Roy Myers	Nominated	
2012	XBIZ Awards	Screenplay of the Year	Lee Roy Myers	Nominated	

== See also ==
- Pornographic parody film
- Axel Braun, director known for parody productions
- This Ain't..., a list of the Hustler-produced parody series
- Tijuana bible, pornographic comic books that often featured parodies of comic strips and celebrities
- Rule 34 (Internet meme)
