= Mick Blue =

Austrian adult entertainer (born 1976)

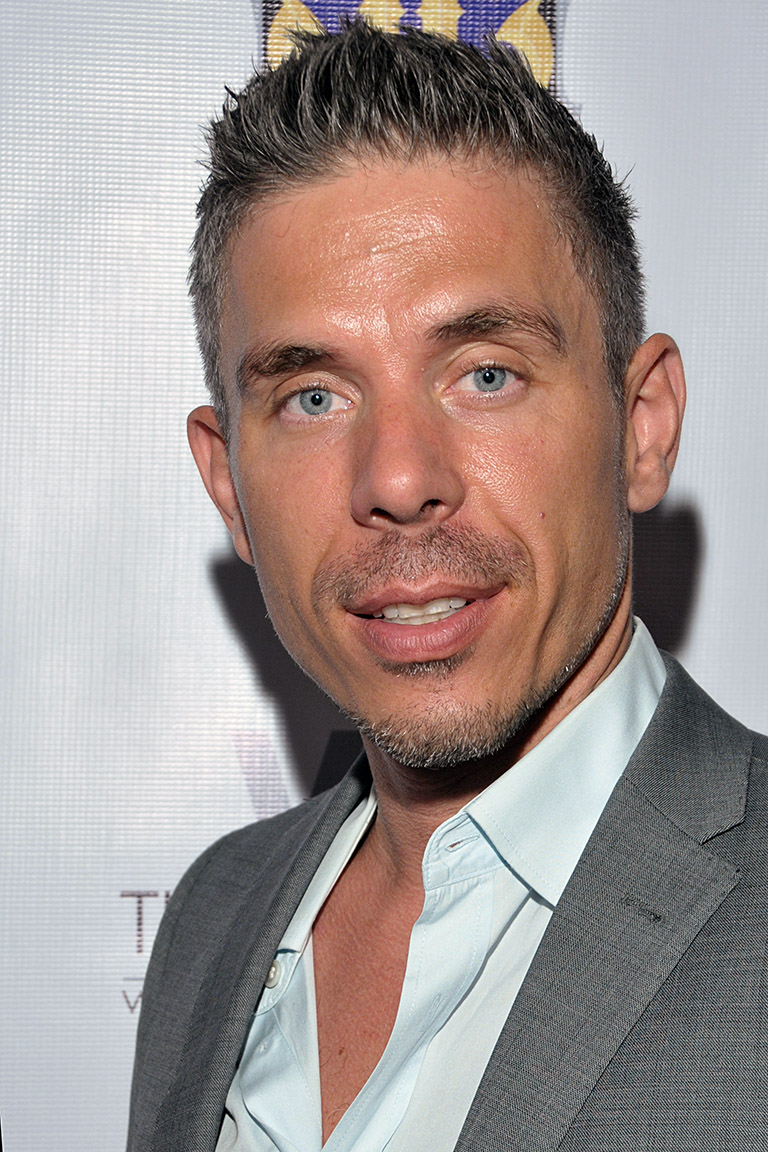
- Blue at the XRCO Awards 2015
- Born: 9 September 1976 (age 50); Graz, Austria
- Other names: Mick Blu, Mickey Blue, Micki Blue, Micky Blue, Miky Blue, Miki Blue, Miki Blu,
- Height: 5 ft 10 in (1.78 m)
- Spouse: Anikka Albrite (m. 2014)

Mick Blue (born 9 September 1976) is an Austrian adult entertainer and adult film director. He has won over 25 awards including the 2015 and 2017 AVN Award for Male Performer of the Year and the XBIZ Award for Male Performer of the Year in 2022. He was inducted into the AVN Hall of Fame in 2017.

== Career ==
Blue began performing in pornographic films in 2000 and expanded to directing in 2004. In January 2005, Blue signed an exclusive performing and directing contract with Zero Tolerance Entertainment. His directorial debut was titled Meet the Fuckers. He has also directed for Elegant Angel using the stage name Grazer. In June 2015, Blue, Anikka Albrite and Maestro Claudio formed the production label BAM Visions for Evil Angel.

In 2017, Blue announced his new racing career via YouTube, stating that it was his childhood dream to become a racing driver. Although he originally aimed to enter the IndyCar Series by 2020, on September 20, 2022, he took first place in the National Auto Sport Association TT6 event in Laguna Seca, California, becoming the national champion for that category. Blue characterized his performance as "the biggest accomplishment I have reached in my racing career and it means the world to me."

Blue was placed on CNBC's list of "The Dirty Dozen: Porn's biggest stars" in 2016.

In 2025, Blue won Best Art Direction at the 2025 AVN Awards for his work in producing Project X.

=== Mainstream media appearances ===
Blue starred in an Austrian documentary film titled Porno Unplugged. He also played a DJ in the 2015 mainstream Austrian film Chimney or Pit.

In 2024, Blue appeared in two episodes of the soap opera General Hospital, playing a casino dealer. He was the first native Austrian actor to land a recurring role on the show.

== Personal life ==
Blue married American pornographic actress Anikka Albrite in 2014.

In 2015, Blue and Albrite won AVN Awards for Male and Female Performer of the Year, making them the first married couple in AVN Awards history to ever win both awards simultaneously.

== Awards ==
List of accolades received by Mick Blue
Awards
Award	Won
AVN Awards	19
Venus Awards	1
Ninfa Awards	1
XBIZ Awards	5
XRCO Awards	1
AFWG Awards	1
- Total number of wins
Totals	28

AVN Awards
Year	Category	Nominated work	Co-winners
2010	Best Group Sex Scene	2040	Alektra Blue, Brad Armstrong, Jayden Jaymes, Jessica Drake, Kayla Carrera, Kaylani Lei, Kirsten Price, Marcus London, Mikayla Mendez, Randy Spears, Rocco Reed, T.J. Cummings and Tory Lane
2012	Best Three-Way Sex Scene (Boy/Boy/Girl)	Asa Akira Is Insatiable 2	Asa Akira and Toni Ribas
2012	Best Double-Penetration Scene	Asa Akira Is Insatiable 2	Asa Akira and Toni Ribas
2013	Best Double-Penetration Scene	Asa Akira Is Insatiable 3	Asa Akira and Ramon Nomar
2013	Best Group Sex Scene	Asa Akira Is Insatiable 3	Asa Akira, Erik Everhard and Ramon Nomar
2013	Best Three-Way Sex Scene (Boy/Boy/Girl)	Lexi	Lexi Belle and Ramon Nomar
2014	Best Anal Sex Scene	Anikka	Anikka Albrite
2014	Best Group Sex Scene	The Gang Bang of Bonnie Rotten	Bonnie Rotten, Jordan Ash, Karlo Karrera and Tony DeSergio
2015	Best Double Penetration Sex Scene	Anikka 2	Anikka Albrite and Erik Everhard
2015	Best Group Sex Scene	Gangbang Me	A.J. Applegate, Erik Everhard, James Deen, Jon Jon, John Strong, Mr. Pete and Ramon Nomar
2015	Best Three-Way Sex Scene (Boy/Boy/Girl)	Allie	Allie Haze and Ramon Nomar
2015	Male Performer of the Year	—N/a	—N/a
2015	Most Outrageous Sex Scene	Gangbang Me	Adriana Chechik, Erik Everhard and James Deen
2016	Best Anal Sex Scene	Being Riley	Riley Reid
2016	Best Group Sex Scene	Gangbang Me 2	Erik Everhard, James Deen, Jon Jon, John Strong and Keisha Grey
2016	Best Three-Way Sex Scene (Girl/Girl/Boy)	Anikka's Anal Sluts	Anikka Albrite and Valentina Nappi
2016	Male Performer of the Year	—N/a	—N/a
2017	Male Performer of the Year	—N/a	—N/a
2017	AVN Hall of Fame inductee	—N/a	—N/a

AFWG Awards
Year	Category	Nominated work
2007	Best European Male Performer	—N/a

Ninfa Awards
Year	Category	Nominated work
2008	Best Actor	The Resolution

Venus Awards
Year	Category	Nominated work	Co-winners
2015	Jury Award for Best Porn Couple	—N/a	Anikka Albrite

XRCO Awards
Year	Category	Nominated work
2015	Male Performer of the Year	—N/a

XBIZ Awards
Year	Category	Nominated work	Co-winners
2013	Best Scene (Feature Movie)	Wasteland	David Perref, Lily Carter, Lily LaBeau, Ramon Nomar and Toni Ribas
2014	Best Scene (Non-Feature Release)	The Gangbang of Bonnie Rotten	Bonnie Rotten, Jordan Ash, Karlo Karrera and Tony DeSergio
2014	Best Scene (Couples-Themed Release)	Hotel No Tell	—N/a
2015	Best Scene (Non-Feature Release)	Gangbang Me	Adriana Chechik, Criss Strokes, Erik Everhard, James Deen and John Strong
2017	Best Sex Scene – Feature Release	—N/a	Anikka Albrite and Sara Luvv
2022	Male Performer of the Year		
