= Bruce Seven =

American pornographer (1946–2000)

- Born: June 4, 1946
- Died: January 15, 2000 (aged 53)
- Other names: Bruce Six
- Occupations: Pornographic film producer and director
- Website: https://www.brucesevenfilms.com

Bruce Seven (June 4, 1946 – January 15, 2000) was an American pornographic film producer and director. He created 200 films and is a member of the AVN Hall of Fame and the XRCO Hall of Fame.

== Career ==
Bruce Seven worked on special effects in the mainstream film industry before he entered the adult film business. He started filming bondage porn on 8 mm film as a hobby around 1970. He was first hired as a professional camera operator around 1980, shooting bondage features for Bizarre Video.

In 1983 Seven and actor John Stagliano formed Lipstik Video, a producer of lesbian themed porn. For Lipstik, Seven produced and co-directed his first film Aerobisex Girls. Seven said publicly that he made lesbian porn because it's his preferred masturbation aid, of which there was, when he started, very little.

Bruce Seven married pornographic actress Bionca in 1984. She appeared in a number of Seven's S&M fetish films such as Autobiography of a Whip (1991), which also included future porn producer Ed Powers.

From 1984 to 1986, Seven directed a line of videos for Vivid Entertainment featuring Ginger Lynn. He also produced and directed the Loose Ends series for 4-Play Video starting in 1985.

In the late 1980s he became seriously ill from emphysema. He recovered in 1989.

Starting in 1990, Seven made films for John Stagliano's Evil Angel Productions as an outside director. For Evil Angel, he directed bondage films including House of Dark Dreams and lesbian films including Where the Girls Sweat. He also directed several films in the Buttman and Buttwoman series.

In 1993, Seven worked with Bionca to launch her new production company, Exquisite Pleasures. He produced and co-directed Takin' It to the Limit with Bionca. The video was Bionca's debut as director and it won the 1994 XRCO Award for Best Video. He also directed the Buttslammers series of all-girl films.

In 1995, Seven suffered a stroke which left him using a wheelchair. He continued to produce and direct, but he withdrew from day-to-day filmmaking. Bruce Seven died on January 15, 2000 from complications of emphysema and the stroke.

=== Honors ===
Seven was inducted into the X-Rated Critics Organization Hall of Fame in 1993. Two of his films, Aerobisex Girls and the original Loose Ends, are also listed in the XRCO Hall of Fame. Seven is also a member of the Adult Video News Hall of Fame. In 2007 he received a posthumous Adam Film World Lifetime Achievement Award.

== Awards ==
- 1994 XRCO Award "Best Video" - Takin' It to the Limit (co-director with Bionca)
- 2007 Adam Film World "Lifetime Achievement Award"

== See also ==
- Erotica
- Pornography
