= The Human Sexipede =

- DVD cover
- Directed by: Lee Roy Myers
- Written by: Lee Roy Myers
- Produced by: Tom Byron
- Starring: Sunny Lane; Keni Styles; Danica Dillan; Tom Byron
- Cinematography: Paul Woodcrest
- Edited by: Lee Roy Myers; Honey Myers
- Production company: Tom Byron Pictures
- Distributed by: Evolution Erotica
- Release date: September 30, 2010
- Running time: 135 minutes
- Country: United States

The Human Sexipede (full title: The Human Sexipede (First Sequence: A porn parody)) is a 2010 American pornographic horror film written and directed by Lee Roy Myers. The film is a parody of the 2009 film The Human Centipede (First Sequence).

== Cast ==
- Sunny Lane as Lindsay
- Keni Styles as Katsuro
- Danica Dillon (as Danica Dillan) as Jenny
- Tom Byron as Dr. Heiter
- Amber Rayne as Marie
- Jynx Maze as Violet
- Kaci Starr as Lana
- Evan Stone as Merve
- Jordan Ash as Ear

== Reception ==
The Human Sexipede has received attention from not only the adult film industry, but from more mainstream media. Best Week Ever described the trailer as "legitimately pretty funny and well-written".
