= Tori Black Is Pretty Filthy =

- cover art for Tori Black Is Pretty Filthy
- Directed by: Mason
- Written by: Mason
- Produced by: Patrick Collins
- Starring: Tori Black, Marie Luv, Kristina Rose, Rebeca Linares, Mark Ashley, Mick Blue, James Deen, Manuel Ferrara & Ice Cold
- Edited by: Bossman Hall
- Production company: Elegant Angel
- Distributed by: Elegant Angel
- Release date: September 16, 2009
- Running time: 197 minutes
- Country: United States
- Language: English

Tori Black Is Pretty Filthy is a 2009 American pornographic film directed by Mason.

== Release ==
The film was released on DVD on September 16, 2009. The DVD release came with several special features, including a behind-the-scenes featurette, slide show, and a trailer.

== Cast ==
- Tori Black
- Kristina Rose
- Marie Luv
- Rebeca Linares
- Ice Cold
- James Deen
- Manuel Ferrara
- Mark Ashley
- Mick Blue

== Awards and nominations ==
List of accolades received by Tori Black Is Pretty Filthy
Awards & nominations
Award	Won	Nominated
AVN Awards	3	4
XBIZ Awards	1	0
XRCO Awards	0	1
- Total number of wins and nominations
Totals	4	5
- References

Ceremony	Category	Recipient	Result
AVN Awards	Best Gonzo Release		Won
AVN Awards	Best Tease Performance	Tori Black	Won
AVN Awards	Best Threeway Sex Scene	Tori Black, Rebeca Linares and Mark Ashley	Won
AVN Awards	Best Anal Sex Scene	Tori Black and Manuel Ferrara	Nominated
AVN Awards	Best Director	Mason	Nominated
AVN Awards	Best Packaging		Nominated
AVN Awards	Best Videography	Mason	Nominated
XBIZ Awards	Gonzo Release of the Year		Won
XRCO Awards	Best Gonzo Movie		Nominated
