= Tori Black =

American pornographic film actress (born 1988)

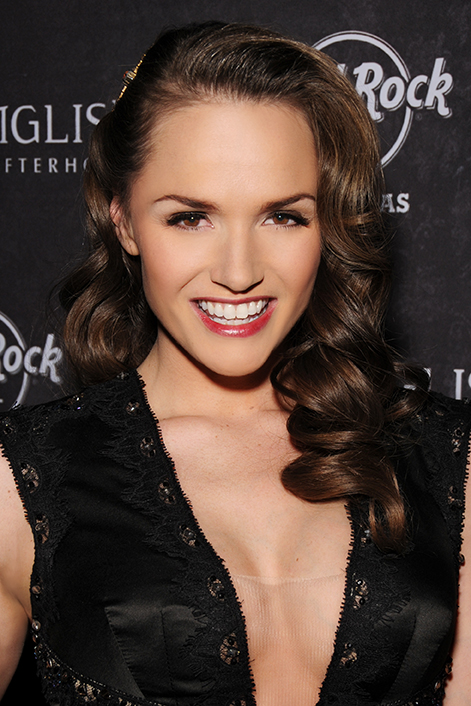
- Black in 2014
- Born: 1988 (age 37–38); Seattle, Washington, U.S.
- Occupation: Pornographic film actress
- Spouse: Lyndell Anderson

Tori Black (born 1988) is an American pornographic film actress. In 2011, she became the first person to win the AVN Female Performer of the Year Award two years in a row. She was inducted in the XRCO and AVN Halls of Fame.

== Early life and education ==
Black was born in 1988 in Seattle, Washington. She stated on Reddit in 2016 that she had studied journalism at Western Washington University.

== Career ==
Black started her career at age 18 in Fort Lauderdale, Florida, where she was on a summer vacation while attending college. At her parents' insistence on getting a job, Black saw an advertisement for an adult talent agency and sent in her pictures. The agency accepted and, after considering their offer, she accepted and returned to the agency a week later. She was the Penthouse Pet of the Month for December 2008.

Black is the first person in history to win two AVN Female Performer of the Year Awards, winning back-to-back years in 2010 and 2011. She also won the 2010 and 2011 XRCO Awards for Female Performer of the Year. In 2011 and 2012, she was also named by CNBC as one of the 12 most popular stars in porn and CNBC noted her role as Catwoman in Vivid Entertainment's Batman XXX: A Porn Parody, as well as her 2010 wins by AVN and XBIZ and 2011 AVN win and XBIZ nomination as Female Performer of the Year.

Black had a guest-starring role in "Gem and Loan", the third episode of season 2 of the Showtime series Ray Donovan where she played porn star Lexi Steele. She also appeared in the film L.A. Slasher.

In 2010, Black was named by Loaded magazine as the most facially attractive female performer in the industry.

Black made her directorial debut with a video for Elegant Angels' website, featuring their Girl of the Month for June 2014, Alina Li.

In 2017, Black, credited as Tori Black, had a small part in the supernatural musical thriller film American Satan.

In March 2020, she was featured in KP Wolfe's music video "You Can Call Me".

== Personal life ==
As of 2018, Black was married to Lyndell Anderson, director of the pornographic film studio Arch Angel. They have two children.

== Awards ==
Awards and nominations
| Award | Won | Nominated |
| AVN Awards | 11 | 50 |
| F.A.M.E. Awards | 2 | 2 |
| NightMoves Awards | 3 | 2 |
| XBIZ Awards | 5 | 6 |
| XRCO Awards | 5 | 4 |
| Other Awards | 7 | – |
- Total number of wins and nominations
| Totals | 33 | 64 |

| Year | Ceremony | Category | Movie |
|---|---|---|---|
| 2009 | AEBN VOD Award | Best Newcomer | —N/a |
| 2009 | XRCO Award | Cream Dream | —N/a |
| 2009 | F.A.M.E. Award | Favorite Female Rookie | —N/a |
| 2010 | AVN Award | Best All-Girl Couples Sex Scene | Field of Schemes 5 |
| 2010 | AVN Award | Best All-Girl Three-Way Sex Scene | The 8th Day |
| 2010 | AVN Award | Best Tease Performance | Tori Black Is Pretty Filthy |
| 2010 | AVN Award | Best Threeway Sex Scene | Tori Black Is Pretty Filthy |
| 2010 | AVN Award | Female Performer of the Year | —N/a |
| 2010 | XBIZ Award | Female Performer of the Year | —N/a |
| 2010 | XRCO Award | Female Performer of the Year | —N/a |
| 2010 | F.A.M.E. Award | Favorite Female Starlet | —N/a |
| 2010 | Fame Registry Award | Rising Star of the Year | —N/a |
| 2011 | AVN Award | Best Oral Sex Scene | Stripper Diaries |
| 2011 | AVN Award | Best POV Sex Scene | Jack's POV 15 |
| 2011 | AVN Award | Best Sex Scene in a Foreign-Shot Production | Tori Black: Nymphomaniac |
| 2011 | AVN Award | Female Performer of the Year | —N/a |
| 2011 | XBIZ Award | Porn Star Site of the Year | ToriBlack.com |
| 2011 | XRCO Award | Female Performer of the Year | —N/a |
| 2011 | Fame Registry Award | Performer of the Year | —N/a |
| 2012 | NightMoves Award | Social Media Star (Editor's Choice) | —N/a |
| 2013 | Fame Registry Award | Fan Favorite Hottest Brunette | —N/a |
| 2014 | Fame Registry Award | Fan Favorite Hottest Brunette | —N/a |
| 2016 | XBIZ Award | Director of the Year – Non-Feature Release | True Lust |
| 2018 | XBIZ Award | Best Sex Scene – All-Girl Release | Tori Black is Back |
| 2018 | Vixen | Angel of the Year | —N/a |
| 2018 | NightMoves Award | Best Star Showcase (Editor's Choice) | Tori Black is Back |
| 2018 | NightMoves Award | Social Media Star of the Year (Editor's Choice) | —N/a |
| 2018 | XRCO Award | Best Cumback | —N/a |
| 2019 | XBIZ Award | Best Sex Scene – Vignette Release | After Dark |
| 2019 | AVN Award | Best Group Sex Scene | After Dark |
| 2019 | Fleshbot Award | Best Group Sex Scene | After Dark |
| 2020 | XRCO Award | Hall of Fame | —N/a |
| 2022 | AVN Award | Hall of Fame | —N/a |

Other nominations

- 2009 AVN nominations
- 2010 NightMoves nominations
- 2012 AVN nominations
- 2012 XBIZ nominations
- 2012 XRCO nominations
- 2013 AVN nominations
