= Lee Roy Myers =

Canadian pornographic film director

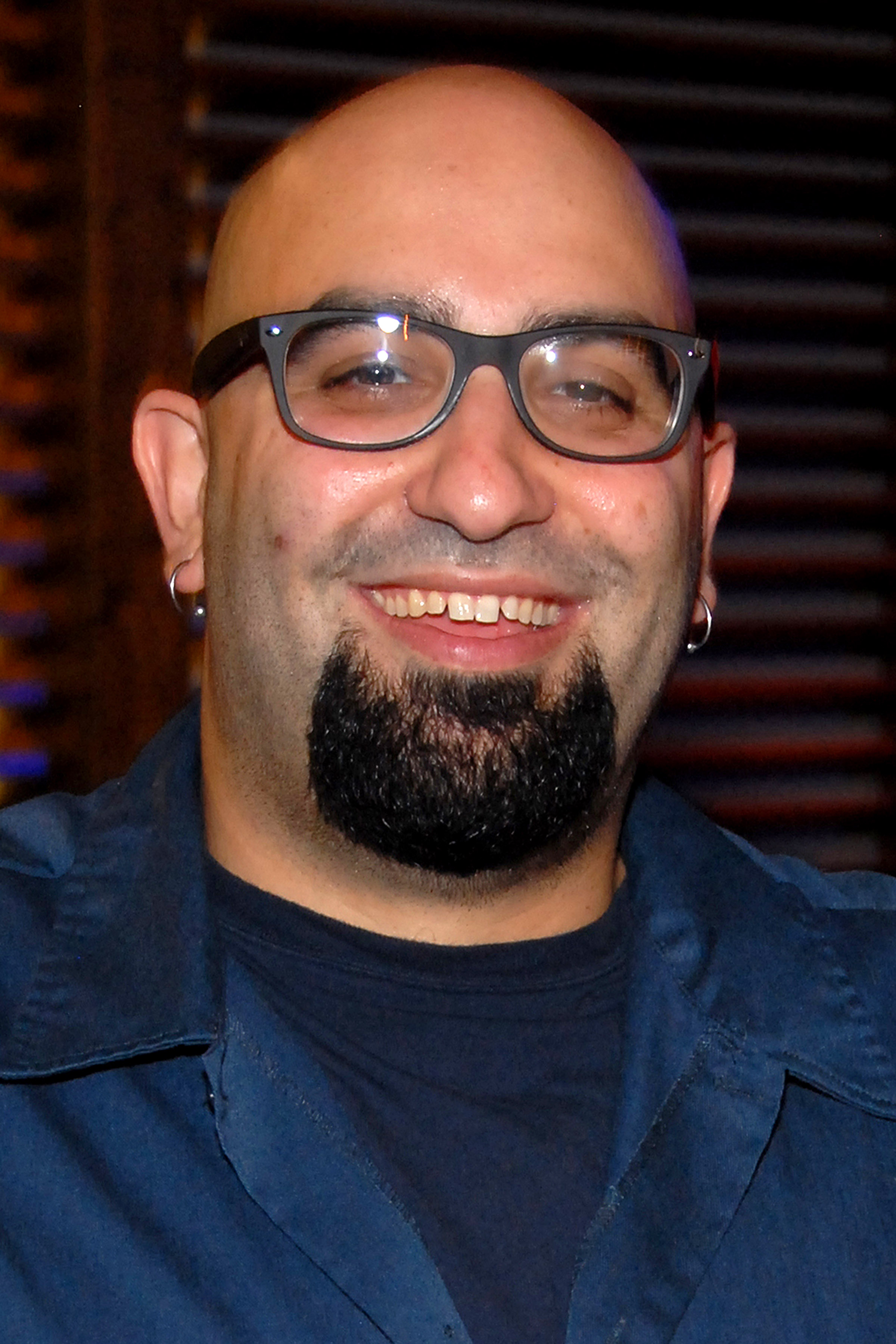
Lee Roy Myers 2011

Lee Roy Myers (born in Montreal, Quebec) is a Canadian pornographic film director, producer, screenwriter, and one of the creators of WoodRocket.com. He started his career with New Sensations in 2009 and developed their A XXX Parody and Romance Series lines.

He has directed and produced films for Adam & Eve, DreamZone Entertainment, Tom Byron Pictures, Zero Tolerance Entertainment, Hustler, Third Degree Films, Wicked Pictures, Capitol Entertainment Agency, Xenith, Full Spread Entertainment, Nightingale Pictures, Brazzers, Woodrocket Mofos, and his own production company, Goodnight Media.

== Filmography ==
Year	Title
2009	Entourage: A XXX Parody
2009	WKRP in Cincinnati: A XXX Parody
2009	'70s Show: A XXX Parody
2009	30 Rock: A XXX Parody
2009	Friends: A XXX Parody
2009	Seinfeld: A XXX Parody
2009	Scrubs: A XXX Parody
2009	The Office: A XXX Parody
2010	Sex & the City: The Original XXX Parody
2010	Seinfeld: A XXX Parody 2
2010	The Breakfast Club: A XXX Parody
2010	The Golden Girls: A XXX MILF Parody
2010	An Eternal Love 2: Reckless Heart
2010	Reno 911: A XXX Parody
2010	The Big Lebowski: A XXX Parody
2010	Big Bang Theory: A XXX Parody
2010	Hustler's Untrue Hollywood Stories: Miley Cyrus' 18th Birthday
2010	Tru: A XXX Parody
2010	Who's the Boss? A XXX Parody
2010	An Eternal Love
2010	The Office: A XXX Parody Episode 2 – The Best Week Ever
2010	An Office Romance
2010	The Engagement Party
2010	The Wedding Day
2010	Cheers: A XXX Parody
2011	A Wet Dream on Elm Street
2011	Grindhouse XXX (segment "Easter")
2011	Pron: The XXX Parody
2011	Here Cums the President
2011	Sex World
2011	Katy Pervy: The XXX Parody
2011	Simpsons: The XXX Parody
2011	The Human Sexipede (First Sequence: A Porn Parody)
2012	The Godfather XXX: A DreamZone Parody
2012	Buffy the Vampire Slayer XXX: A Parody
2012	Family Guy: The XXX Parody
2012	Romeo and Juliet
2012	Pink Lips
2012	Cafe Amore
2012	Maid for Love (as Lee Roy Meyers)
2012	The Honeymoaners
2013	SpongeKnob SquareNuts
2013	Sailor Poon: A XXX Interactive Parody
2014	The Doctor Whore Porn Parody
2014	Pornocopia
2014	Comedians in Cars Getting Sex
2014	TSA: Touching Searching and Pussy Pounding
2014	Game of Bones: Winter Is Cumming
2015	Strokémon: The XXX Parody
2015	Bob's Boners and Other Porn Parodies
2015	Bob's Boners
2016	Ten Inch Mutant Ninja Turtles: The XXX Parody
2016	Assventure Time
2016	Gnardians of the Galaxy and Other Porn Parodies
2016	Fap to the Future: The XXX Parody
2019	The Laygo Movie

== Award nominations ==
- 2010 AVN Award nominee – Director of the Year, Body of Work
- 2010 AVN Award nominee – Best Director, Feature – Seinfeld: A XXX Parody
- 2010 XBIZ Award nominee – Director of the Year, Body of Work
- 2010 XBIZ Award nominee – Director of the Year, Individual Project – 30 Rock: A XXX Parody
- 2011 AVN Award nominee – Director of the Year, Body of Work
- 2011 AVN Award nominee – Best Director, Feature – The Big Lebowski: A XXX Parody
- 2011 AVN Award nominee – Best Screenplay, Adapted – The Big Lebowski: A XXX Parody
- 2011 AVN Award nominee – Best Screenplay, Adapted – Cheers: A XXX Parody
- 2011 AVN Award nominee – Best Screenplay, Adapted – Reno 911: A XXX Parody
- 2012 AVN Award nominee – Best Director, Parody – Godfather: A DreamZone Parody
- 2012 AVN Award nominee – Director of the Year, Body of Work
- 2013 XBIZ Award nominee – Director of the Year, Parody – Buffy the Vampire Slayer XXX

== Award wins ==
- 2009 Nightmoves Award winner – Best Parody (Fan Favorite), The Office: A XXX Parody
- 2010 AVN Award winner – Best Parody, Sex Files (Producer)
- 2010 Nightmoves Award winner – Best Parody (Editor's Choice), The Big Bang Theory: A XXX Parody
- 2011 XBIZ Award winner – Director of the Year – Body of Work
- 2011 XBIZ Award winner – Best Parody, The Big Lebowski: A XXX Parody
- 2011 XRCO Award winner – Best Parody, Comedy, The Big Lebowski: A XXX Parody
