= Erik Everhard =

Canadian pornographic actor

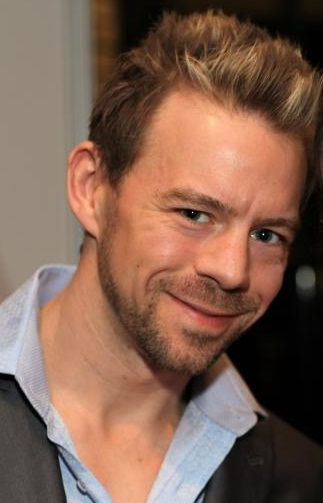
- Everhard in 2013
- Born: Mitchell Hartwell; December 2, 1976 (age 49); Calgary, Alberta, Canada
- Height: 5 ft 10 in (1.78 m)

Erik Everhard (born December 2, 1976) is the stage name of Mitchell Hartwell, a Canadian pornographic actor and director, known for gonzo pornography films.

== Biography ==
Everhard is a Canadian of Ukrainian ancestry. In 1995, he moved to Vancouver, British Columbia, to attend university, at which time he made his first foray into adult films. Everhard's adult film career began in Canada performing for websites. At the urging of friends and colleagues, he moved to Los Angeles in 1999 to pursue his career. His first shoot in the United States was for director Jules Jordan.

After making a name for himself as a performer, Everhard began directing videos for Anabolic and Diabolic Video in 2001. In 2003, he landed a distribution deal with Redlight District. In 2005, Everhard left Redlight, successfully suing the company for breach of contract, conversion, claim and delivery, and accounting. He was then hired by Evil Angel Video. After shooting several films with Evil Angel, Everhard returned to work with Jordan.

Everhard performed in about 2,400 films in his pornographic career.

== Awards ==
Erik Everhard awards and nominations
Awards and nominations
Award	Won	Nominated
AVN Awards	14	1
Adam Film World Guide Awards	1	0
NightMoves Awards	2	0
XBIZ Awards	2	0
XRCO Awards	3	0
- Total number of wins and nominations
Totals	23	1

AVN Awards
Year	Category	Nominated work	Co-nominees	Result	Ref(s)
2007	Best Group Sex Scene (Video)	Fashionistas Safado: The Challenge	Belladonna, Melissa Lauren, Jenna Haze, Gianna, Sandra Romain, Adrianna Nicole, Flower Tucci, Sasha Grey, Nicole Sheridan, Marie Luv, Caroline Pierce, Lea Baren, Jewell Marceau, Jean Val Jean, Christian XXX, Voodoo, Chris Charming, Mr. Pete & Rocco Siffredi	Won	
2007	Best Sex Scene in a Foreign-Shot Production	Outnumbered 4	Isabel Ice, Sandra Romain, Dora Venter, Cathy, Karina, Nicol, Puma Black, Steve Holmes, Robert Rosenberg	Won	
2009	Best POV Sex Scene	Double Vision 2	Tory Lane & Katja Kassin	Won	
2009	Best POV Series	Double Vision	—	Won	
2009	Best Young Girl Release	Jailbait 5	—	Won	
2010	Best Anal Sex Scene	Anal Cavity Search 6	Sasha Grey	Won	
2010	Best POV Release	Anal Prostitutes on Video 6	—	Won	
2011	Best Double Penetration Sex Scene	Asa Akira Is Insatiable	Asa Akira & Toni Ribas	Won	
2011	Best Orgy/Gangbang Release	Out Numbered 5	—	Won	
2012	Best Group Sex Scene	Asa Akira Is Insatiable 2	Asa Akira, Toni Ribas, Danny Mountain, Jon Jon, Broc Adams, Ramon Nomar & John Strong	Won	
2012	Best POV Sex Scene	Double Vision 3	Andy San Dimas & Bobbi Starr	Won	
2012	Best POV Release	Double Vision 3	—	Won	
2012	AVN Hall of Fame inductee	—	—	Honoured	
2013	Best Group Sex Scene	Asa Akira Is Insatiable 3	Asa Akira, Ramon Nomar & Mick Blue	Won	
2013	Best POV Release	Eye Fucked Them All	—	Won	
2019	Male Foreign Performer of the Year	—	—	Nominated	

XRCO Awards
Year	Category	Nominated work	Co-nominees	Result	Ref(s)
2001	Unsung Swordsman	—	—	Won	
2003	Male Performer of the Year	—	—	Won	
2010	XRCO Hall of Fame inductee	—	—	Honoured	

XBIZ Awards
Year	Category	Nominated work	Co-nominees	Result	Ref(s)
2013	Best Scene - Vignette Release	In Riley's Panties	Riley Steele	Won	
2015	Best Scene - Non-Feature Release	Gangbang Me	Adriana Chechik, Mick Blue, James Deen, Criss Strokes and John Strong	Won	

NightMoves Awards
Year	Category	Nominated work	Co-nominees	Result	Ref(s)
2013	Best Male Performer (Editor's Choice)	—	—	Won	
2014	Best Male Performer (Fan's Choice)	—	—	Won	

Adam Film World Guide Awards
Year	Category	Nominated work	Co-nominees	Result	Ref(s)
2007	Male Performer Of The Year	—	—	Won	
