= Evil Angel (studio) =

American production company and distributor of pornographic films

- Type: Private
- Industry: Pornography
- Founded: March 19, 1989; 37 years ago
- Headquarters: Van Nuys, Los Angeles, California 91405, U.S.
- Area served: Worldwide
- Products: Pornographic films
- Services: Video on demand
- Owner: John Staglino
- Website: Official website

Evil Angel is an American independent production company and distributor of pornographic films, founded and owned by John Stagliano.

Stagliano and Evil Angel pioneered the gonzo pornography genre in the late 1980s. Several of the most acclaimed pornographic film directors have worked for Evil Angel, and its films have won numerous awards.

It has been described as "the top porn-film producer" in the U.S., as one of the handful of companies which dominate the distribution of hardcore pornographic films in the U.S., and as one of the most profitable porn studios.

== History ==
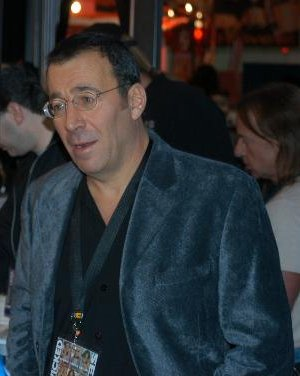
Evil Angel owner John Stagliano

=== Background and beginnings ===
The company's rise to prominence was fueled by the industry switch from film to videotape. In the late 1970s, a feature-length porn film shot on photographic film—usually 35mm—might have cost as much as $350,000. In 1983, the VCR had been recently introduced, and producers were beginning to make pornographic films on videotape. A film using video could be made for as little as $5,000, compared to a minimum of $40,000 for a movie shot on film. Into the 1990s, by shooting its productions with video cameras, Evil Angel could still make films for $8,000. Stagliano initially had little knowledge of filmmaking, but he made his first movie for $8,000 in 1983: Bouncing Buns, starring Stacy Donovan. For the next six years, he shot films for other companies to manufacture and distribute.

In 1989, he started Evil Angel, to sell his own films. The origin of the company's name goes back to when Stagliano was working as a stripper: "There was another guy in one of my shows named John. So this MC started calling me Evil John to differentiate us. This was when I was doing Dracula and chains. At the same time I had a girlfriend who called herself Angel when she did strip shows. She was a very nasty girl and I suggested that she call herself Evil Angel. She didn't, but I loved the name and wound up using it for my company."

=== Buttman and Gonzo ===
The first Evil Angel film was Dance Fire, filmed in 1988 by Stagliano, starring himself, Trinity Loren, Brandy Alexandre and others. It would only be released on DVD 20 years later. Influenced by amateur pornography, in 1989, Stagliano hit on the idea of performing in a film while also operating the camera, so that the viewer experiences the film through the eyes of his character. The first-person perspective was influenced by the 1960s film Blowup. At the time this was in contrast to the majority of porn, which tended not to make viewers aware of the camera. This technique is today known as Point of view pornography. He formed his Buttman persona, and shot Adventures of Buttman. The early Buttman films were written, produced, directed, edited, shot and manufactured personally by Stagliano. The first two Buttman films had lengthy scripts, but the series soon evolved into an improvised, spontaneous format. In contrast to his earlier work and the standard porn of the time, Stagliano did not link each scene together to form a conventional narrative. At times, the camerawork was shaky. Partly due to his lack of funds, he did not use elaborate sets or locations. At the time, porn films had a traditional storyline, with sex scenes interspersed with dialogue by performers with little acting ability. Instead of that format, Stagliano chose to film "one sex scene which has a beginning, a middle and ends at a climax. Trying to make all that relate to a bigger story is very difficult and creates all sorts of problems that get in the way of making the best scene possible." The distinct style of the early Evil Angel films would be widely imitated, and would come to be known as Gonzo pornography.

=== Success ===
In the 1990s, Stagliano became one of the most successful figures in the American pornographic film industry. In 1990, Patrick Collins and Stagliano founded the Elegant Angel label as a subsidiary of Evil Angel. In 1991, Stagliano established a production subsidiary in São Paulo, Brazil. By 1993, the company was producing a new videotape every three weeks, and was grossing more than $1 million a year; in 1996, it sold approximately half a million videos. In the mid-90s, the company started using the phrase "The Evil Empire" on its box covers, in reference to its growing stable of directors. In 1996, Collins established Elegant Angel as a separate company, and in 1998, it ended all cooperation with Evil Angel. His departure from Evil Angel has been called "less than amicable", and he and Stagliano are apparently "ex-friend[s]". At the time Collins said that Stagliano "couldn't run a business, and would fail without him". According to Stagliano, "Patrick's a bully ... he wasn't doing his job properly ... I should have fired him years ago".

A 1997 U.S. News & World Report investigation identified Evil Angel as the most profitable pornographic studio. In 2007, the studio received 127 AVN Award nominations in 60 categories, making it the fourth year in a row in which it received more than 100 nominations. In 2008, EA won 18 AVN awards. Stagliano won the "Best Director - Video" award for Fashionistas Safado: Berlin.

In 2015, company vice president John Grayson reported that transsexual pornography was by far the company's most profitable category or genre, earning about 20% more on a per-movie basis than any other productions.

=== Legal issues ===
In August 2007, Evil Angel and Jules Jordan prevailed in a DVD piracy case against Kaytel Video Distribution and several other defendants, winning a total of over $17.5 million, which was the largest sum ever awarded in an adult piracy case. Evil Angel was awarded $11.2 million and Jordan $5.3 million. EA had originally filed the lawsuit in November 2005.

On April 8, 2008, Evil Angel and Stagliano were indicted on federal obscenity charges by a federal grand jury in Washington, D.C. Films named in the obscenity charges included Storm Squirters 2 by Joey Silvera, Milk Nymphos by Jay Sin and a trailer for Belladonna: Fetish Fanatic 5. Stagliano and Evil Angel were represented by Al Gelbard, who successfully defended JM Productions owner Jeff Steward in a 2007 obscenity case. The company released a compilation DVD entitled Defend Our Porn, with proceeds going towards its legal defense fund, and set up the DefendOurPorn.org website to provide information on the legal proceedings.

In December 2008, the BBC reported that Stagliano and Evil Angel were a client of UK lawyers Davenport Lyons who were seeking financial redress from people they asserted had downloaded copyright material using Peer to Peer software.

== Directors and films ==
The company differs from most other porn studios in that it contracts with in-house directors and permits them to own the films that they create, while Evil Angel handles the film's manufacture, distribution, promotion and sales and takes a percentage of the gross sales. Each director has their own particular style and is a star in their own right, with their own brand identity. Stagliano adopted this business model due to his previous experience selling his videos to other companies. He found it difficult to establish his reputation when someone else owned his content, and he did not receive any more money if a film sold well.

The company's roster of directors, includes Stagliano himself, Aiden Starr, Proxy Paige, LeWood, John Leslie, Rocco Siffredi, Joey Silvera, Christoph Clark, Nacho Vidal, Jonni Darkko, Jake Malone, Jay Sin, Jazz Duro, Manuel Ferrara, Lexington Steele, Mike Adriano, Steve Holmes, Uncle D and Belladonna. Previous directors include Gregory Dark, Jules Jordan, Bruce Seven, Bionca, Alex de Renzy and Erik Everhard.

=== Former directors ===
Actress Brandy Alexandre, John Stagliano's girlfriend when Evil Angel Video launched, was the first outside director of an Evil Angel title, writing and directing the 1989 hits De Blond and Blowing in Style. Gregory Dark left VCA over "creative differences" in the summer of 1995 and launched his own film company, Dark Works, with Evil Angel Video handling all distribution. His first film for Evil Angel was Sex Freaks, starring Stephanie Swift, Nyrobi Knights, Lovette and Tom Byron. He also worked on Snake Pit and The Best Of Gregory Dark. Dark has since stopped directing for the studio.

Jules Jordan formerly directed for Evil Angel, producing series including Ass Worship, Feeding Frenzy, Flesh Hunter, Trained Teens and Once You Go Black... You Never Go Back. In 2006, he left to form his own company, Jules Jordan Video.

Erik Everhard also worked with the company, after directing for Anabolic Video, Diabolic Video (which would later become part of Zero Tolerance Entertainment) and Red Light District Video. He left Red Light District in 2005 to join Evil Angel, before joining Jules Jordan Video.

Glenn King has also worked with the company producing several series including "Mean Cuckold" and "ManEaters".

=== Current directors ===
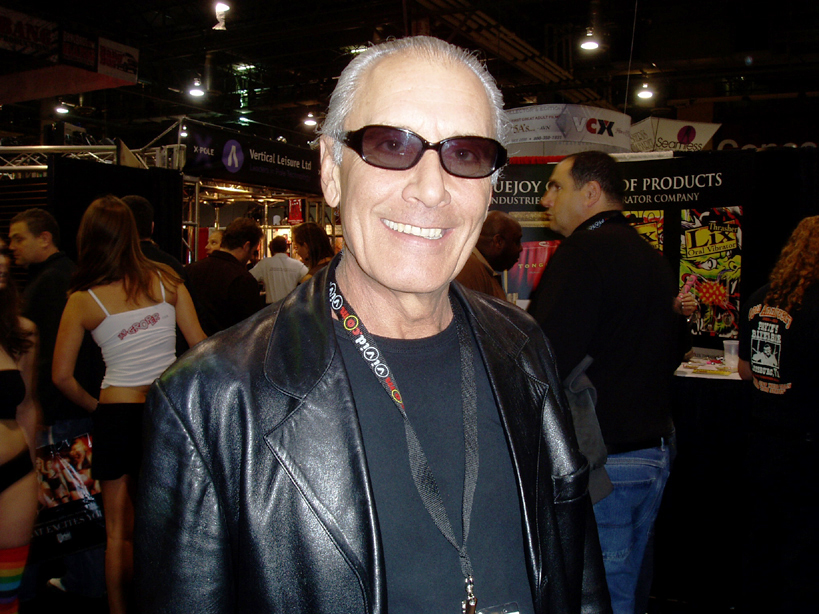
John Leslie

Stagliano has directed several series for the studio. By 2003, almost 30 entries in the Buttman series had been produced, some of them shot in locations including New Zealand, Prague (Czech Republic), San Diego and London. The premise of most of the films is Stagliano approaching a woman and persuading her to show him her buttocks, followed by their having sex. The films blurred the boundary between what was a pre-arranged set-up and what was real. It has also been turned into a comic book.

John Leslie had a successful career as an actor, then began directing for VCA Pictures in the mid-80s. The first film he directed for Evil Angel was The Dog Walker in 1994, after its script had been rejected by VCA. Rocco Siffredi began working as a director for the company in 1994.

Joey Silvera started directing for Evil Angel in 1995. Previously, he had been an actor, then directed for Devil's Film in the early 1990s, from 1998 onwards, his 'Rogue Adventures' series (along with Devil's Film's own 'Transsexual Prostitutes' series) helped bring transsexual pornography into the mainstream. Christoph Clark joined the company in 1997. His first film was Euro Angels. Nacho Vidal joined the studio in late 2001. Jonni Darkko first directed for New Sensations. In 2004, he formed Darkko Productions and joined Evil Angel.

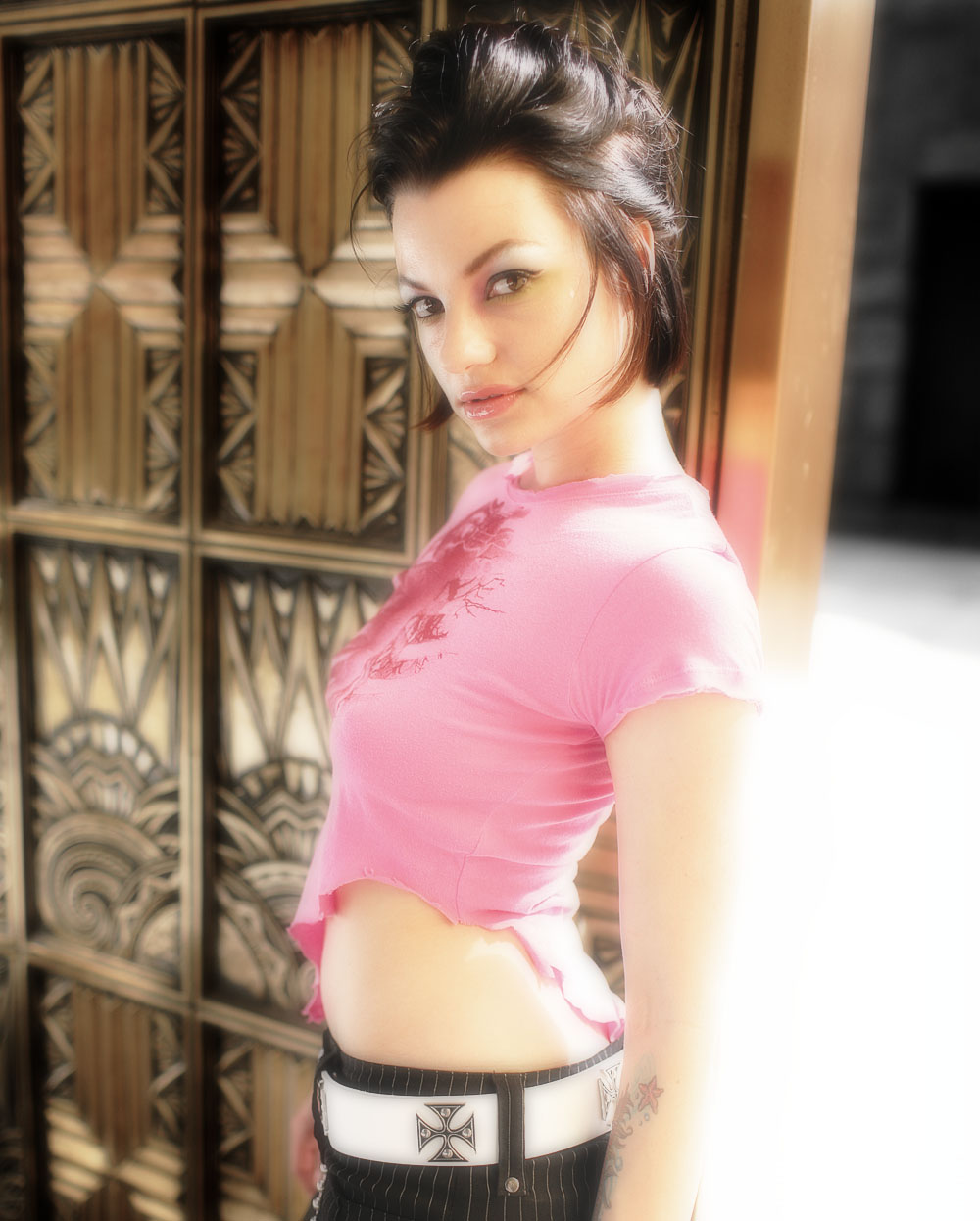
Belladonna

Manuel Ferrara released his first Evil Angel film in May 2006, after working for Red Light District Video for two years. He was originally a protégé of Rocco Siffredi, and had an award-winning acting career, including an appearance in Stagliano's Fashionistas. Jake Malone signed an exclusive distribution deal in June 2006.

Belladonna was first introduced to Stagliano by her then-boyfriend Nacho Vidal. Evil Angel is the exclusive distributor of titles under the Belladonna Entertainment and Deadly Nightshade Productions labels.

Jay Sin started directing for Buttman Magazine Choice in early 2007, working on films including Milk Nymphos 2, then became an EA director in January 2008. Sin is known for his extreme anal pornography, more recently including rectal prolapse in some of his videos. Many of his videos also feature women inserting objects such as oranges and baseballs into their rectums, then pushing the objects back out. Sin calls his films "artistic" and states that porn is "a way of life" for him.

== Evil Angel Publishing ==
Evil Angel Publishing is the magazine division of Evil Angel. In March 2007, it launched Extra Parts, a 100-page publication featuring pictures from director Joey Silvera's movies featuring transgender women.

== Awards ==
The following is a selection of some of the major awards Evil Angel films have won:

- 1992 AVN Award - 'Best Film' for Wild Goose Chase
- 1993 AVN Award - 'Best Film' for Face Dance, Parts I & II
- 1997 AVN Award - 'Best Gonzo Series' for Butt Row
- 1997 AVN Award - 'Best Continuing Video Series' for The Voyeur
- 1998 AVN Award - 'Best Video Feature' for Buda
- 1998 AVN Award - 'Best Continuing Video Series' for Fresh Meat
- 1999 AVN Award - 'Best Transsexual Release' for The Big-Ass She-Male Adventure
- 2000 AVN Award - 'Best Continuing Video Series' for The Voyeur
- 2000 AVN Award - 'Best Anal-Themed Series' for Rocco's True Anal Stories
- 2000 AVN Award - 'Best Transsexual Release' for Rogue Adventures 3: Big-Ass She-Male Adventure
- 2001 AVN Award - 'Best Gonzo Series' for Please!
- 2001 AVN Award - 'Best Anal-Themed Series' for Rocco's True Anal Stories
- 2001 AVN Award - 'Best Transsexual Release' for Rogue Adventures 3: Big-Ass She-Male Adventure 7
- 2002 AVN Award - 'Best Anal-Themed Series' for Rocco's True Anal Stories
- 2002 AVN Award - 'Best Transsexual Release' for Rogue Adventures 13
- 2002 AVN Award - 'Best Gonzo Series' for Buttman
- 2002 AVN Award - 'Best Continuing Video Series' for Animal Trainer
- 2003 AVN Award - 'Best Anal-Themed Series' for Ass Worship
- 2003 AVN Award - 'Best Video Feature' for The Ass Collector
- 2003 AVN Award - 'Best Film' for The Fashionistas
- 2004 AVN Award - 'Best DVD' for The Fashionistas
- 2003 AVN Award - 'Best Gonzo Series' for The Voyeur
- 2003 AVN Award - 'Best Transsexual Release' for Rogue Adventures 15
- 2004 AVN Award - 'Best Oral-Themed Feature' for Feeding Frenzy 2
- 2004 AVN Award - 'Best Anal-Themed Series' for Ass Worship
- 2004 AVN Award - 'Best Gonzo Series' for Service Animals
- 2004 AVN Award - 'Top Renting Release of the Year' for The Fashionistas
- 2004 AVN Award - 'Best Transsexual Release' for She-Male Domination Nation
- 2005 AVN Award - 'Best Vignette Release' for Tales From the Crack
- 2005 AVN Award - 'Best Anal-Themed Series' for Ass Worship
- 2006 AVN Award - 'Best Pro-Am Release' for Rocco's Initiations 9
- 2006 AVN Award - 'Best Vignette Release' for Vault of Whores
- 2006 AVN Award - 'Best Gonzo Series' for Service Animals
- 2006 AVN Award - 'Best Transsexual Release' for Rogue Adventures 24
- 2007 AVN Award - 'Best Transsexual Release' for Rogue Adventures 27
- 2007 AVN Award - 'Best Specialty Release - Fem-Dom Strap-On' for Strap Attack 4
- 2007 AVN Award - 'Best Specialty Series - Big Bust' for Boob Bangers
- 2008 XBIZ Award - 'Best Studio'
- 2008 AVN Award - 'Best Continuing Video Series' for Belladonna: Manhandled
- 2008 AVN Award - 'Best POV Release' for Fucked on Sight 2
- 2008 AVN Award - 'Best POV Series' for Fucked on Sight
- 2008 F.A.M.E. Awards - 'Favorite Studio'
- 2009 AVN Award - 'Best Anal-Themed Series' - tie between Evil Anal and Butthole Whores
- 2009 AVN Award - 'Best Foot Fetish Release' for Belladonna's Foot Soldiers
- 2009 AVN Award - 'Best Gonzo Series' for Slutty and Sluttier
- 2009 AVN Award - 'Best Oral-Themed Release' for Blow Job Perversion
- 2009 AVN Award - 'Best Oral-Themed Series' for Face Fucking, Inc.
- 2009 AVN Award - 'Best Specialty Release - Other Genre' for Milk Nymphos 2
- 2010 AVN Award - 'Best Specialty Release - Other Genre' for Asses of Face Destruction 5
- 2011 AVN Award - 'Best Specialty Release - Other Genre' for Asses of Face Destruction 9
- 2011 XBIZ Award - 'Gonzo Release of the Year - Non-Feature' for Tori, Tarra and Bobbi Love Rocco
- 2012 XBIZ Award - 'Gonzo Release of the Year' for Phat Bottom Girls
- 2012 XBIZ Award - 'Fetish Release of the Year' for Odd Jobs 5
- 2012 XBIZ Award - 'Latin-Themed Release of the Year' for Made in Xspana 7
- 2012 XBIZ Award - 'European Non-Feature Release of the Year' for Slutty Girls Love Rocco 3
- 2012 XBIZ Award - 'Transsexual Release of the Year' for She-Male Police 2
- 2013 XBIZ Award - 'European Non-Feature Release of the Year' for Slutty Girls Love Rocco 4
- 2014 XBIZ Award - 'Studio of the Year'
- 2014 XBIZ Award - 'Transsexual Release of the Year' for American She-Male X 5
- 2015 XBIZ Award - 'All-Sex Series of the Year' for James Deen's 7 Sins
- 2015 XBIZ Award - 'Asian-Themed Release of the Year' for Kalina Ryu: Asian Fuck Toy
- 2015 XBIZ Award - 'Transsexual Studio of the Year'
- 2015 XBIZ Award - 'Transsexual Release of the Year' for Big Tit She-Male X 2
- 2016 XBIZ Award - 'Studio of the Year'
- 2017 DVDEROTIK Award - 'Transsexual Release of the Year' for Jay Sin: TS Playground 24
