= Danica Dillon =

American pornographic film actress

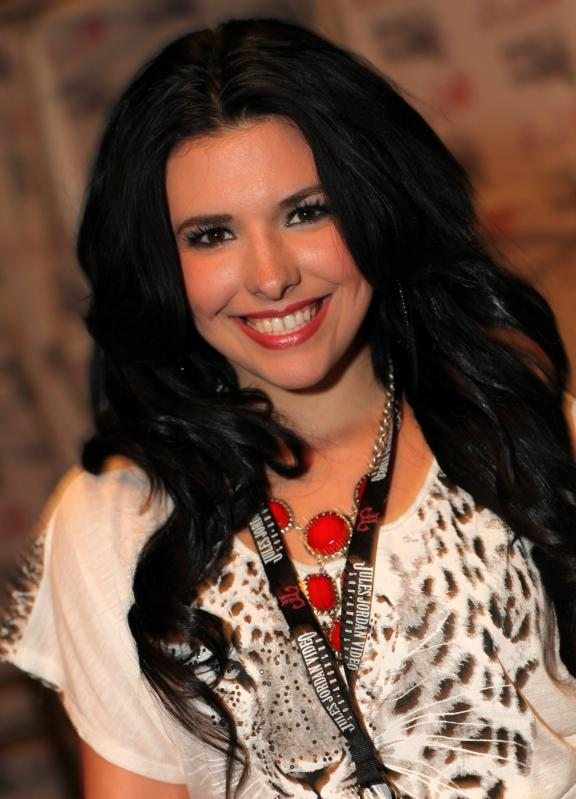
- Dillon in 2013
- Born: Ashtabula, Ohio, U.S.
- Other names: Danica Dillon; Danica Dillan
- Occupation: Pornographic film actress
- Children: 1
- Website: Danica Dillon at danicafans.com (archived)

Danica Dillon is an American pornographic film actress who debuted in 2009 and then went on to appear in mainstream (non-adult) roles in cable television movies. Dillon is also a featured dancer at men's clubs and is a featured guest on radio and podcast shows.

== Career ==
Dillon was selected to be one of the presenters at the Sex Awards in Hollywood, California.

Dillon started feature dancing at men's clubs in July 2013. Her first appearance was at Gold Club Centerfolds in Rancho Cordova, California.

Dillon was featured in the May/June issue of the Girls of Penthouse in a photo set with porn actor Tommy Gunn titled "Danica Dillon’s Cheating Ways."

Dillon made her mainstream acting debut in the TV series Femme Fatales in the Season 1 episodes "Girls Gone Dead" and "Angel & Demons". Her next mainstream project was the Showtime movie Scared Topless. The supernatural-themed thriller features a group of undergraduate students taking a class in "the supernatural and the afterlife." Her role is the daughter of a famous magician who died when she was a young girl.

== Personal life ==
In early 2014, Dillon had breast augmentation surgery to increase her breast size to a 34DD.

Dillon is married to a United States Marine, with whom she has a son.

== Allegations against Josh Duggar ==
On November 18, 2015, it was made public that Danica was suing Josh Duggar for US$500,000. In her lawsuit, Dillon claimed that Duggar physically assaulted her on two occasions in Philadelphia after paying her for sex. In February 2016, Dillon chose to drop the lawsuit after evidence showed that Duggar was not in Philadelphia at the time of the alleged assault.

== Awards and nominations ==
Year	Ceremony	Result	Award
2011	AVN Award	Nominated	Best New Starlet
2011	XBIZ Award	Nominated	New Starlet of the Year
2013	NightMoves Award	Won	Miss Congeniality
2014	Fanny Award	Nominated	Most Underrated Star - "The Who?"
