= Rebeca Linares =

Spanish pornographic actress (born 1983)

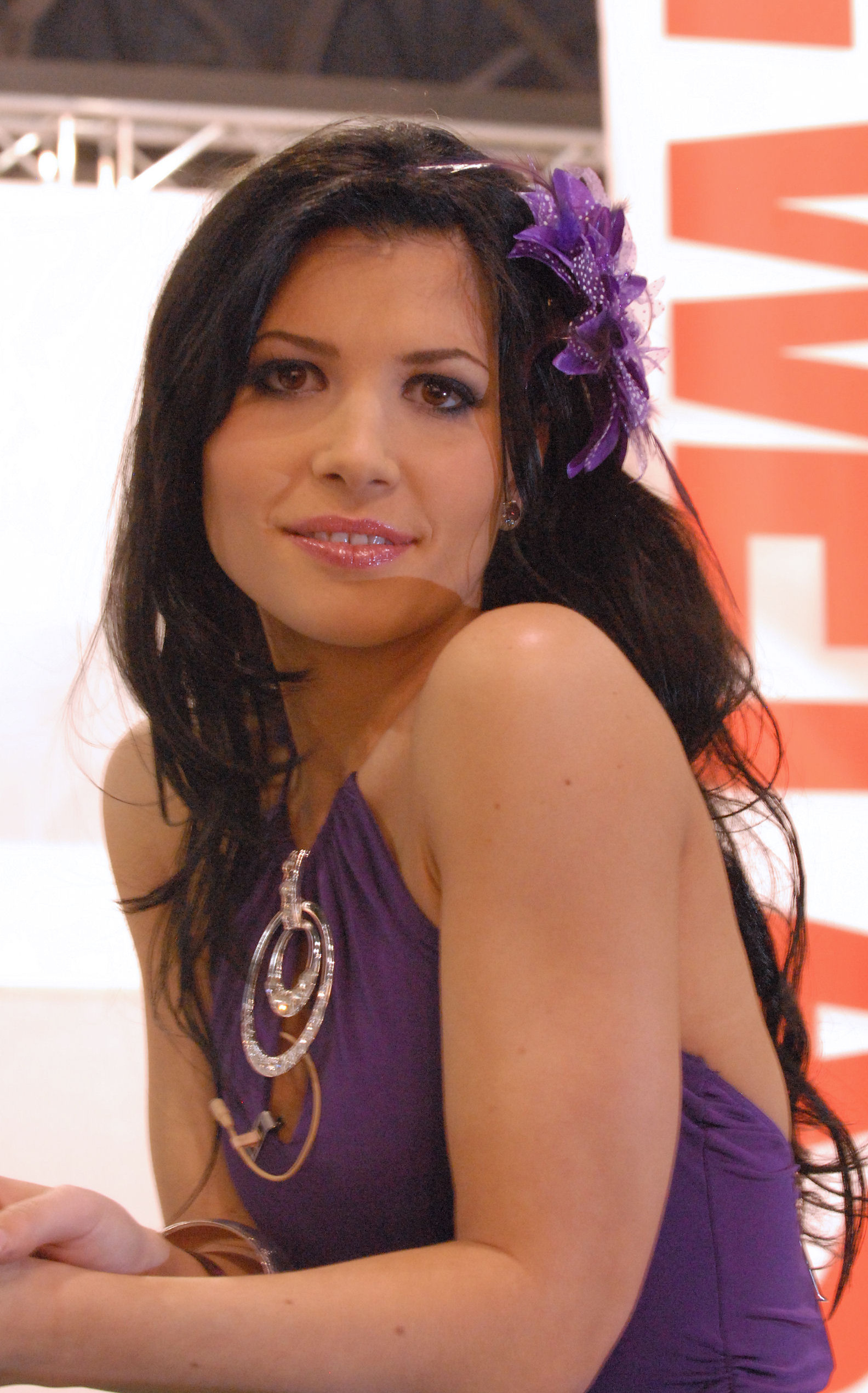
- Linares in 2009
- Born: 1983 (age 42–43); San Sebastián, Spain
- Citizenship: Spanish

Rebeca Linares (born 1983) is a Spanish pornographic film actress and Penthouse Pet.

== Biography ==
Born in San Sebastián in the Basque Country Autonomous Community of Spain, At the age of 4, she moved to Barcelona with her mother. Linares began appearing in adult movies in 2005 in Spain; her best friend was a friend of Spanish adult star Nacho Vidal. Due to the low volume of work and money in Spain, she began working in other parts of Europe, such as Berlin and France. She moved to Los Angeles in March 2006. Linares said about her move, "I wanted to stay in one place, living and working every day, and here is the whole business."

In 2008, she shot a photo spread for Maxim magazine. In 2009, she was chosen as the Penthouse Pet of the Month for March. Later that year, Spanish television channel Canal+ made a documentary about her life and career in America entitled Vente a Las Vegas, Nena (Come to Las Vegas, Baby). In January 2010, Linares won an AVN Award, along with Tori Black and Mark Ashley, for their three-way scene from the movie Tori Black Is Pretty Filthy.

From 2005 to 2011, Linares shot nearly 700 scenes before going on hiatus. She returned to the industry in December 2023.

== Awards ==
- 2007 FICEB Ninfa Award – Best Supporting Actress (Iodine Girl)
- 2010 AVN Award – Best Threeway Sex Scene (Tori Black Is Pretty Filthy)
- 2010 Urban X Award – Female Performer of the Year
