= Jules Jordan =

American actor and director

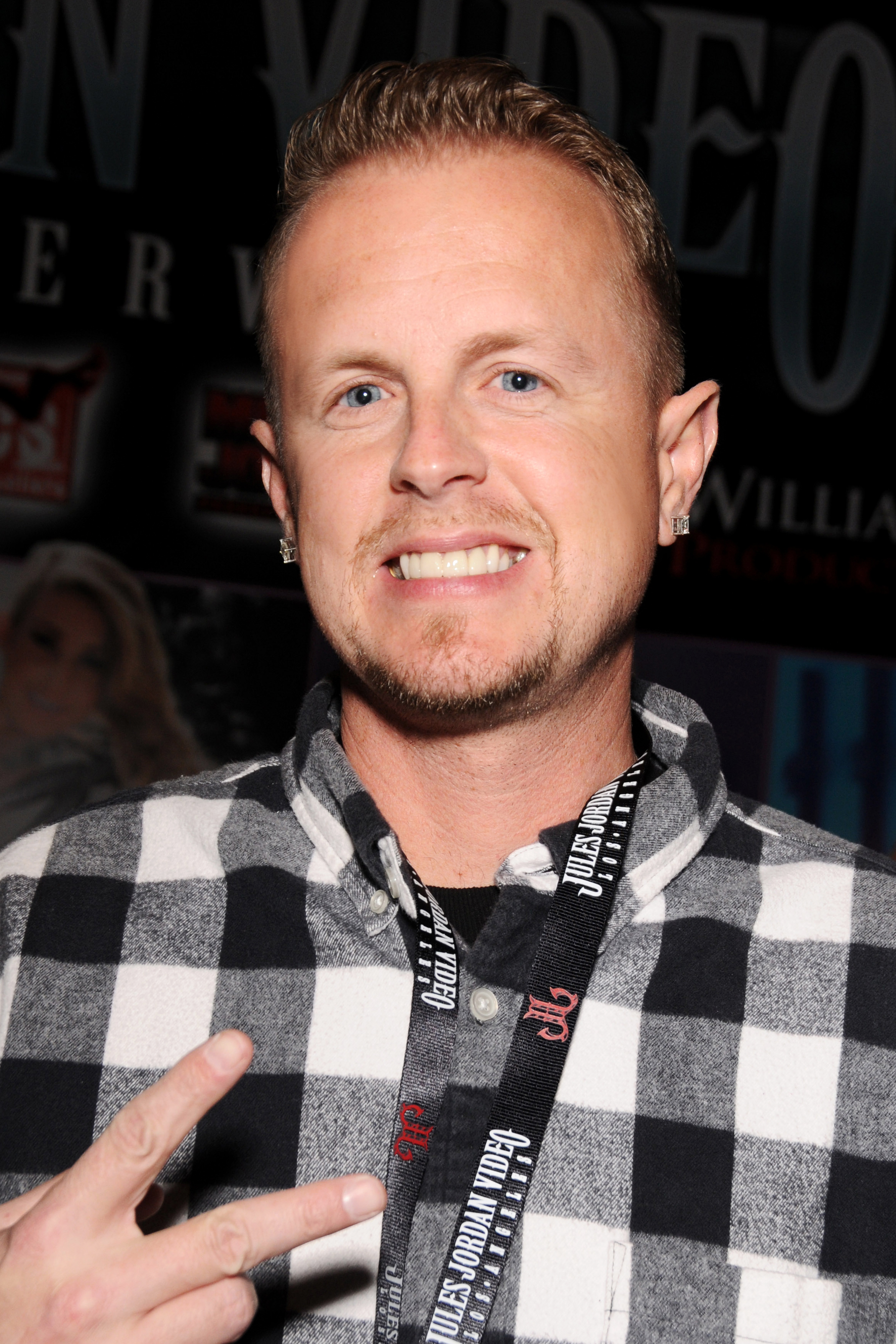
- Jordan in 2014
- Born: Ashley Gasper; May 25, 1972 (age 54); Harrisburg, Pennsylvania, U.S.
- Height: 5 ft 7 in (1.70 m)
- Website: julesjordan.com

Jules Jordan (born May 25, 1972) is an American adult film actor, director, and producer. He launched the production and distribution company Jules Jordan Video in 2006, and has been inducted into the AVN and XRCO Halls of Fame.

== Early life ==
Jordan was born in Harrisburg, Pennsylvania. An only child, he was raised by his mother in Hershey; he never met his father. As a teen, Jordan worked at an amusement park, a skateboard shop, an Italian restaurant, a pizza joint, and a Subway restaurant. He attended Hershey High School.

One of his first exposures to pornography was looking through his grandfather's explicit movie collection on 8 mm film.

After trying out a semester of college, Jordan dropped out to work full-time. He began working as a clerk for an adult video store he frequented as a customer.

== Career ==
Jordan's entry into the adult film industry was through Frank Kay, owner of International Video Distributors (IVD). Kay initially hired Jordan for sales, and then gave him a chance to shoot movies under his established Pleasure and Rosebud labels.

In 1998, Jordan directed the first full-length movie of his career for Pleasure Productions, releasing Live Bait. One of the women he shot, Chastity, helped propel the tape to national notoriety because she was a pro wrestling valet for World Championship Wrestling (WCW). Jordan sold several individual scenes prior to releasing Live Bait, selling early scenes to Odyssey Group and Elegant Angel. He produced more than 50 videos for Pleasure and Rosebud during a two-year span.

In 1999, Jordan moved to Los Angeles after finding it difficult to produce films on the East Coast. He spent his first two months living in an Econo Lodge. After jobs with Vivid Entertainment and Elegant Angel failed to materialize, he started working for IVD again out of his apartment with just a fax machine.

Jordan helped re-invigorate IVD's Rosebud line in 1999–2000, producing, directing and selling titles such as Bottom Feeders (1-4), Deep Cheeks (6-7), Anal Sluts & Sweethearts (4-5) and Heavy Metal (1-2). Jordan won the first AVN Award of his career in 2002 for Heavy Metal, which was honored as the Best Anal-Themed Release.

Jordan signed a DVD distribution deal with John Stagliano's studio Evil Angel in 2001, becoming their top-selling director in his first year on their roster. While working with Evil Angel, he launched signature titles such as Ass Worship, Flesh Hunter and Feeding Frenzy, all three of which would go on to become AVN award-winning series. When Jordan left Evil Angel in 2006 to form his own production company (Jules Jordan Video), he was their top-selling director. Jordan said, "I wanted to control my own destiny, with where my product was headed."

In 2013, Jordan closed a distribution deal with Kink.com to bring their content to DVD for the first time.

In 2015, Jordan signed Jesse Jane to an two-year exclusive performance contract where she would perform in eight movies per year.

== Personal life ==
He voiced his support for Democratic candidate Hillary Clinton for the 2016 U.S. presidential election.

== Awards ==
List of accolades received by Jules Jordan
Awards and nominations
Award	Won	Nominated
AVN Awards	17	1
F.A.M.E. Awards	2	0
NightMoves Awards	1	1
XBIZ Awards	9	1
XRCO Awards	6	1
- Total number of wins and nominations
Totals	35	4

AVN Awards
Year	Result	Award	Film	Ref.
2007	Won	Best New Video Production Company for Jules Jordan Video	—N/a	
2007	Won	Best Oral-Themed Release	Feeding Frenzy 8	
2007	Won	Best Specialty Release - Big Bust	Breast Worship	
2008	Won	Director of the Year (Body of Work)	—N/a	
2008	Won	Best Interracial Release	Black Owned 2	
2008	Won	Best Oral-Themed Series	Feeding Frenzy	
2009	Won	Best Director, Ethnic Video	Lex the Impaler 3	
2009	Won	Best Anal-Themed Release	Jules Jordan's Weapons of Ass Destruction 6	
2009	Won	Best Big Bust Release	Big Tits at School	
2009	Won	Best Ethnic-Themed Release - Black	Black Ass Addiction 2	
2009	Won	Best Ethnic-Themed Release - Black	Black Ass Addiction	
2009	Won	Best Internal Release	All Internal 7	
2009	Won	Best POV Series	Double Vision	
2009	Won	Best Young Girl Release	Jailbait 5	
2010	Won	Best Director, Ethnic Video	Lex the Impaler 4	
2011	Won	Best Director, Ethnic Video	Lex the Impaler 5	
2011	Won	AVN Hall of Fame inductee	—N/a	
2017	Nominated	Best Director - Non-Feature	Face of an Angel Mind of a Devil	

F.A.M.E. Awards
Year	Result	Award	Film	Ref.
2006	Won	Favorite Director	—N/a	
2010	Won	Favorite Director	—N/a	

NightMoves Awards
Year	Result	Award	Film	Ref.
2008	Won	Best Director (Editors' Choice)	—N/a	
2017	Nominated	Best Non Feature Director	—N/a	

XBIZ Awards
Year	Result	Award	Film	Ref.
2007	Won	Up-and-Coming Studio of the Year	—N/a	
2008	Won	Gonzo Director of the Year	—N/a	
2010	Won	Studio of the Year	—N/a	
2011	Won	Ethnic Release of the Year	Black Ass Master 4	
2012	Won	Gonzo/All-Sex Studio of the Year	—N/a	
2013	Won	Gonzo Series of the Year	Ultimate Fuck Toy	
2014	Won	Gonzo Series of the Year	Ultimate Fuck Toy	
2014	Won	All-Black Release of the Year	Black Heat	
2015	Won	Latin-Themed Release of the Year	Latinas on Fire 2	
2018	Nominated	Director of the Year - Body of Work	—N/a	

XRCO Awards
Year	Result	Award	Film	Ref.
2001	Won	Best Director		
2002	Won	Best Threeway Sex Scene	Trained Teens	
2003	Won	Director of the Year	—N/a	
2006	Won	Best Director (Non-Features)	—N/a	
2008	Won	Best Director (Non-Features)	—N/a	
2009	Won	XRCO Hall Of Fame Inductee (Film Creators)	—N/a	
2017	Nominated	Best Director (Non-Features)	—N/a	
