= Elegant Angel =

Pornographic film studio

Elegant Angel Productions
- Type: Private
- Industry: Pornography
- Founded: 1990; 36 years ago
- Founder: Patrick Collins; John Stagliano
- Headquarters: Canoga Park, Los Angeles, California, U.S
- Area served: United States, Europe
- Key people: Patrick Collins, (Co-founder, owner, President); Graham Travis, (General Manager); Ava Max, (Brand Ambassador)
- Products: Pornographic films
- Divisions: Elegant Angel Europe
- Website: elegantangel.com

Elegant Angel Productions is an independent pornographic film studio located in Canoga Park, California and owned by Patrick Collins. The company is considered one of the early pioneers of gonzo pornography, and its films have won numerous awards.

== History ==
Elegant Angel (EA) was founded in 1990 by Collins in partnership with pornographic film maker John Stagliano as a subsidiary of Stagliano's Evil Angel Video.

The two labels soon became pioneers of gonzo pornography, along with other producers such as Rodney Moore and Ed Powers. Stagliano had pioneered the Gonzo genre in the late 1980s.

In 1996, Collins established Elegant Angel as a separate company, and in 1998 it ended all cooperation with Evil Angel. His departure from Evil Angel has been called "less than amicable", and he and Stagliano are apparently "ex-friend[s]". At the time Collins said that Stagliano "couldn't run a business, and would fail without him". According to Stagliano, "Patrick's a bully", "and he wasn't doing his job properly". "I should have fired him years ago".

Israel Chapa Gonzalez, who was a designer, cameraman and often performed on screen, joined Elegant Angel in 1996 as a set designer. On 27 May 1997, he shot dead Glendale police officer Charles A. Lazzaretto and wounded two others at the company's warehouse in Chatsworth. Throughout the night he exchanged fires with the police and at 6am next morning police entered the building and found Gonzales dead from a gunshot wound.

== Operations and management ==
In 2004 the studio stopped production for two months. Collins then refocused the company on producing niche-themed pornography, and discontinued some series that had more ambiguous themes and were not selling well. The firm's logo and box-cover art were also redesigned and simplified. It hired a new DVD authoring contractor, and launched a new PR campaign. The company then went back to producing as many as eight new titles a month. Production was also halted for a month in early 2004 when the studio joined the moratorium on filming caused by Darren James's HIV infection.

In August 2004 the company opposed calls from Democratic California Assembly member Paul Koretz for the adult industry to use condoms. In response to the HIV outbreak in the industry in March the same year, Koretz had threatened to instigate legislation requiring mandatory condom use. EA head of production Graham Travis responded that there was consumer demand for scenes without condoms, and that forcing condom-use would force some studios out of business.

From June 2006 onwards Elegant started to see a sustained increase in DVD sales.

In 2007 the company started launching a number of paysites. SwallowSquirt.com was launched in April, followed by BigWetAsses.com in June, and PornStarSquirt.com in September.

In June 2014, Collins announced the installation of a new management team at EA. Premiere Sales Group president and proprietor Drew Kennedy was selected as the new president and So-Cal Wholesale Distribution owner Gabriel Guzman will serve as COO. Collins changed his mind after a week due to complications from his pending divorce. Guzman instead started ArchAngel Productions in October 2014 and another company, Exquisite Multimedia, purchased the content of Elegant Angel in 2015 in order to form a partnership with Patrick Collins's ex-wife, Cindy Collins, who owns the trademark name "Elegant Angel".

== Films ==
Elegant Angel has produced several multi-award-winning film series including Buttwoman, Big Wet Asses, Cumback Pussy, and the Sodomania series. Several EA films were included in AVN's book on the Top 500 Greatest Films.

In 1993 Collins bribed a Hungarian transport official to allow him to film Buttwoman Does Budapest on the city's busiest Number 18 tram, as it travelled through the Taban Park neighborhood. The bribe was US$100 and a box of chocolates, and Collins became the first American pornography director to film in Budapest. The film starred Collins' wife Tianna, and features public sex scenes in front of the city's main tourist attractions.

Niche-themed series that followed the 2004 hiatus included Cum Drenched Tits, teen-themed films like It's a Daddy Thing, and ethnic-themed releases like Up That Black Ass, Big Black Wet Asses and Latin Booty Worship.

Some of Elegant Angel's most successful series have focused on the niche of female ejaculation. Squirtwoman was the first, followed by Swallow My Squirt, Flower's Squirt Shower starring Flower Tucci, Cum Rain Cum Shine and Squirt in My Gape.

More recent series include Blow it Out Your Ass, which focuses on milk enemas and anal creampies, and the snowballing line, Sperm Swappers.

== Actresses ==
Actresses who have starred in EA films include Cytherea, Flower Tucci, Brianna Love, Jada Fire, Alexis Texas, and Riley Reign. English star Nici Sterling appeared in many of the company's earlier films.

Tiana Lynn starred in Cum Rain Cum Shine in 2004. She then started working for the company behind the scenes, as a receptionist and in public relations. Lynn quit performing in February 2006 to work in Elegant Angels' sales department full-time.

== Directors ==
Patrick Collins originally directed several of the companies films himself. He had previously directed the Sodomania series whilst working with Stagliano. Collins would go on to direct Squirtwoman starring Cytherea, Cum Rain Cum Shine in 2004, and the solo masturbation line All By Myself.

Collins praises the contribution of cameraman Michael Cates to the studio's early success. Cates later directed films including Sodomania 7 and Sleeping Booty.

The studios original directors were Collins, and the young team of Rob Black, Tom Byron and Van Damage. These three had previously worked for Collins creating films under the Extreme Associates label, when Extreme was a partner of Evil/Elegant Angel. During this period they directed series like The Blowjob Adventures of Dr. Fellatio, Cumback Pussy, Miscreants, and Filthy First Timers. In 1997, Black, Byron, and Damage left Elegant Angel to establish Extreme Associates as a separate company.

Mason and Jake Malone directed for EA at the start of their careers, however both left in early 2004.

Thomas Zupko directed three films in the Big Wet Asses series.

William H was responsible for Tails of Perversity 2, and the Flower's Squirt Shower and Big Wet Asses series.

Marc Wallice directed the series, Marc Wallice's Tales of Perversity. Wallice had previously acted, however turned to directing when, after a false HIV test scandal, he was revealed to be HIV-positive.

Performer and director L.T. joined Elegant in early 2006, and worked on lines including Big Black Wet Asses and Up That Black Ass.

Writer and director David Stanley also worked for Elegant Angel before moving to Wicked Pictures.

== Distribution deals ==
In late 2003, Elegant Angel arranged for Devil's Film to take over the exclusive distribution of Elegant Angel titles in the U.S. The deal was dissolved in early 2004, in a mutual agreement by both companies.

In October 2006, Elegant Angel entered a deal with LFP Broadcasting, owner of Hustler TV, for Hustler TV to distribute Elegant Angel content over cable and satellite pay-per-view and video on demand television.

In November 2006, Elegant Angel announced that it would distribute its videos in Europe exclusively through Red Light District Video, but in April 2007, Elegant Angel launched its own European division, Elegant Angel Europe.

== Awards ==
The following is a selection of some of the major awards EA films have won.

- 1996 AVN Award - 'Best Vignette Release' for Sodomania 12
- 1997 AVN Award - Best Amateur Series - Filthy First Timers
- 1997 AVN Award - 'Best Vignette Release' for Sodomania 16
- 1998 AVN Award - Best Gonzo Series - Cumback Pussy
- 1999 AVN Award - 'Best Vignette Release' for Sodomania 24
- 2000 AVN Award - 'Best Vignette Release' for Sodomania 28
- 2000 AVN Award - Best Oral-Themed Series - Blowjob Adventures of Dr. Fellatio
- 2001 AVN Award - Best Oral-Themed Series - Blowjob Adventures of Dr. Fellatio
- 2002 AVN Award - Best Ethnic-Themed Release - Freakazoids
- 2003 AVN Award - Best Specialty Release - Big Bust - Heavy Handfuls
- 2003 AVN Award - Best Vignette Release - Mason's Dirty Trixxx
- 2004 AVN Award - Best Specialty Big Bust Release - Heavy Handfuls 2
- 2004 AVN Award - Best Vignette Tape - Mason's Dirty Trixxx 2
- 2004 AVN Award - Best Vignette Release - Mason's Dirty Trixxx 2
- 2005 AVN Award - Best Vignette Series - Sodomania
- 2005 AVN Award - Best Anal-Themed Feature - Big Wet Asses 3
- 2005 AVN Award - Best Specialty Release, Other Genre - Cytherea Iz Squirtwoman
- 2006 AVN Award - Best Specialty Release - Squirting - Flower's Squirt Shower 2
- 2006 AVN Award - Best Oral-Themed Series - Glazed and Confused
- 2006 AVN Award - Best Anal-Themed Series - Big Wet Asses
- 2007 AVN Award - Best Anal-Themed Series - Big Wet Asses
- 2007 AVN Award - Best Specialty Release - Squirting - Flower's Squirt Shower 3
- 2007 AVN Award - Best Specialty Series - Squirting - Flower's Squirt Shower
- 2008 AVN Award - Best Anal-Themed Series - Big Wet Asses
- 2008 AVN Award - Best Gonzo Release - Brianna Love Is Buttwoman
- 2008 AVN Award - Best MILF Release - It's a Mommy Thing
- 2008 AVN Award - Best Squirting Release - Flower's Squirt Shower 4
- 2008 AVN Award - Best Squirting Series - Jada Fire Is Squirtwoman
- 2008 Empire Award - Best Overall Studio - Elegant Angel
- 2008 Empire Award - Best All-Sex DVD - Alexis Texas is Buttwoman
- 2009 AVN Award - Best All-Sex Release - Alexis Texas is Buttwoman
- 2009 AVN Award - Best Big Bust Series - Big Wet Tits
- 2009 AVN Award - Best Big Butt Release - Big Wet Asses 13
- 2009 AVN Award - Best Big Butt Series - Big Wet Asses
- 2009 AVN Award - Best Solo Release - All By Myself 3
- 2009 AVN Award - Best Squirting Release - Jada Fire is Squirtwoman 3
- 2009 AVN Award - Best Squirting Series - Jada Fire Is Squirtwoman
- 2009 AVN Award - Best Young Girl Series - It's a Daddy Thing
- 2009 XRCO Award - Best Gonzo Movie - Alexis Texas is Buttwoman
- 2009 XRCO Award - Best Gonzo Series - Big Wet Asses
- 2009 XBIZ Award - Gonzo Release of the Year - Performers of the Year
- 2010 XBIZ Award - Gonzo Movie of the Year - Tori Black Is Pretty Filthy
- 2010 XBIZ Award - Gonzo Release - Pornstar Workout
- 2011 XBIZ Award - Gonzo Studio of the Year
- 2011 XBIZ Award - Gonzo Series of the Year - Big Wet Asses
- 2011 XBIZ Award - Gonzo Release - Pornstar Workout
- 2012 XBIZ Award - Studio of the Year
- 2012 XBIZ Award - Feature Movie of the Year - Portrait of a Call Girl
- 2012 XBIZ Award - Gonzo Release of the Year - Asa Akira Is Insatiable 2
- 2012 XBIZ Award - All-Sex Release of the Year - Performers of the Year 2011
- 2013 XBIZ Award Nominee - 'Studio of the Year', 'Feature Movie of the Year' for Wasteland, 'Gonzo Release of the Year' for Big Wet Asses 20, Jada Stevens is Buttwoman and Lexi; also 'Gonzo Series of the Year' for Big Wet Asses and Bombshells. Additional nominations include: 'All-Sex Release of the Year' for Asa Akira is Insatiable 3, Best New Starlets 2012, Bombshells 4 and Dani Daniels: Dare; also, 'All-Sex Series of the Year' for Anal Fanatic and Massive Asses; 'All-Girl Release of the Year' for Lush 2
- 2013 XBIZ Award - Feature Movie of the Year - Wasteland
- 2013 XBIZ Award - Gonzo Release of the Year - Lexi
- 2013 XBIZ Award - All-Black Series of the Year - Club Elite
- 2014 XBIZ Award - Gonzo Release of the Year - Skin
- 2017 XBIZ Award - All-Black Release of the Year - Big Black Wet Asses 14
- 2017 DVDEROTIK Award - Lesbian Release of the Year - Squirt Gangbang 5
