= NightMoves Awards =

Adult entertainment industry award

NightMoves Award
- Location: Tampa Bay Area, Florida
- Country: United States
- Presented by: NightMoves magazine
- Reward: Trophy
- First award: 1993
- Final award: Present
- Website: nightmovesonline.com

The NightMoves Awards are given annually in the US pornographic film industry by NightMoves, an Oldsmar, Florida-based magazine which was first published in 1987 and initially titled Sports South. The awards began in 1993 and were initially titled the Central Florida Adult Entertainment Awards. It is the third oldest continuously running adult awards show in the United States, after the AVN Awards and the XRCO Awards. It also marks the start of the porn industry's awards season. In addition to the show's national awards, local awards are also given to sexually oriented businesses and dancers in the Tampa Bay Area. Two awards are given for each national category: one which is chosen by fans and the other one which is chosen by the editors of NightMoves magazine. An online voting ballot is available for approximately three months every year for the fan's choice awards. Recipients of the editor's choice awards are chosen based on film reviews.

The awards have been held at several different venues throughout the Tampa Bay Area, including The Krush in Tampa in 1995, and 1996, Club XS in Downtown Tampa in 1997, 1998, and 1999, Stormin's Palace in Clearwater in 2000, 2001, and 2004, the Pinellas Expo Center in Pinellas Park in 2002, club Twilight in Tampa in 2003, Bricktown 54 in Clearwater in 2005, 2006, and 2007, the Dallas Bull in Tampa in 2008, 2009, 2010, 2011, and 2012, and the Tampa Gold Club in 2013, 2014, and 2015. Pornographic actor Ron Jeremy has hosted every show so far.

The NightMoves Awards added a new a category titled the Triple-Play Award in 2006. Also known as the Anna Award, it was created in honor of the late pornographic actress Anna Malle. Recipients of the award are recognized for their excellence in at least three different fields of the adult entertainment industry, such as performing, directing, and feature dancing. The first recipient of the award was Stormy Daniels. In 2007, NightMoves added a Hall of Fame to its awards show. Two additional award categories were also added that year: Best All Girl Release and Best Comedy or Parody Release. In 2012, the show added award categories for Best Social Media Star, Best Website (individual performer), Best Multi-site Network, Best Parody – Comedy, Best Parody – Drama, Best Parody – Super Hero, Best Boobs, Best Ass, Best Overall Body, Best Latina Performer, Best Transsexual Performer, and Best Transsexual Release.

== National award winners ==
=== Best Actor ===
Year	Fan's Choice	Editor's Choice
1995	Steven St. Croix	
1996	Mike Horner	
1997	Rocco Siffredi	
1998	Mike Horner	Peter North
1999	Peter North	Randy Spears
2000	Seymore Butts	Herschel Savage
2001	Evan Stone	Dillon Day
2002	Sean Michaels	Randy Spears
2003	Barrett Blade	Nick Manning
2004	Lexington Steele	Steven St. Croix
2005	Randy Spears	Eric Masterson
2006	Evan Stone	Manuel Ferrara
2007	Barrett Blade	Marcus London
2019	Seth Gamble	Tommy Pistol
2020	Seth Gamble	
2021	Tommy Pistol	
2022	Seth Gamble	
2023	Tommy Pistol	
2024	Mick Blue	

=== Best Actress ===
Year	Fan's Choice	Editor's Choice
1995	Kylie Ireland	
1996	Jenna Jameson	
1997	Jenna Jameson	
1998	Serenity	Midori
1999	Alisha Klass	Jill Kelly
2000	Serenity	Juli Ashton
2001	Tera Patrick	Julie Meadows
2002	Jewel De'Nyle	Jessica Drake
2003	Devon	Belladonna
2004	Alexis Amore	Stormy Daniels
2005	Carmen Luvana	Savanna Samson
2006	Stormy Daniels	Jesse Jane
2007	Eva Angelina	Hillary Scott
2019	Avi Love	Romi Rain
2020	Angela White	Maitland Ward
2021	Kenzie Reeves	
2022	Kenzie Taylor	
2023	Ana Foxxx	
2024	Kira Noir	
2025	Emma Hix	
2026	Octavia Red	

=== Best Adult Internet Site ===
Year	Fan's Choice	Editor's Choice
2003	ClubJenna.com	MikeSouth.com
2004	ClubJenna.com	DPTonight.com
2009	Freeones.com	Twistys.com
2012	BangBros.com	VNAGirls.com

=== Best All Girl Release ===
Year	Fan's Choice	Editor's Choice
2007	The Predator - Wicked Pictures	No Man's Land - No Man's Land Productions/Metro
2008	Bree & Kayden - Adam & Eve	Women Seeking Women 40 - Girlfriends Films
2009	Sun Goddess: Malibu - skinworXXX/Adam & Eve	The Violation of Kylie Ireland - JM Productions
2010	Bree & Teagan - Adam & Eve	Lil' Gaping Lesbians - Evil Angel
2011	Mother-Daughter Exchange Club 19 - Girlfriends Films	Cherry - JewelBox/Digital Playground
2012	Please Make Me Lesbian! 7 - Girlfriends Films	Girls Love Girls 4 - Jonni Darkko/Evil Angel
2013	Mother Superior - Girl Candy Films	Slumber Party Cupcake Sluts - Reign Productions
2014	Women Seeking Women #100 - Girlfriends Films	Alexis & Asa - Adam & Eve
2015	Women Seeking Women #113 - Girlfriends Films	Girls Kissing Girls #15 - Sweetheart Video
2016	Annika and Carter - Adam & Eve	Women Seeking Women #124 - Girlfriends Films
2017	Riley & Abella - Adam & Eve	Angela Loves Women 2 - AWP
2018	Mother Daughter Exchange Club - Girlfriends Films	Becoming Elsa - Sweetheart Video
2020	Teenage Lesbian - Adult Time	
2021		Student Teacher Relations - Sweetheart Video

=== Best All Sex/Gonzo Release ===
Year	Fan's Choice	Editor's Choice
2004	Assplotiations - Mayhem Films	Evil Pink - Evil Angel
2005	Jack's Playground - Digital Playground	Anal Expedition - Red Light District Video
2006	Jenna Haze Darkside - Jules Jordan Video	Vault of Whores - Evil Angel
2007	Chanel Illustrated - ClubJenna/Vivid Entertainment/Pulse	Busty Hookers - The Score Group/Pure Play Media
2008	Big Wet Asses 13 - Elegant Angel	E for Eva - Jonni Darkko/Evil Angel
2009	Nurses - Digital Playground	Alexis Texas Is Buttwoman - Elegant Angel
2010	Deviance - Skinworxxx/Adam & Eve	Horny Heartbreakers - Wicked Pictures
2011	Big Wet Asses 18 - Elegant Angel	Cheerleaders Academy 2 - Adam & Eve
2012	Asa Akira Is Insatiable 2 - Elegant Angel	Asses for the Masses - Assence/Exile
2013	D3viance - Adam & Eve	Meet Bonnie - Digital Sin
2014	Riley Goes Gonzo - Axel Braun Productions	Tattooed Goddesses - Jules Jordan Video
2015	MILF Soup #39 - Bang Bros	MILF Performers of the Year 2015 - Elegant Angel
2016	Kayden Kross’ Casting Couch 3 - Airerose Entertainment	Daddy Knows Best - Blazed Studios
2017	Natural Beauties - Vixen.com	Hot Wife Cream Pie - Zero Tolerance
2018	DP Me #6 - Hard X	# My Ass 4 - Arch Angel
2020	Angela White: Darkside - Jules Jordan	
2021		Axel Braun's Down 2 Fuck - Wicked Pictures

=== Best Anal Release ===
Year	Fan's Choice	Editor's Choice
2006	Ass Worship 8 - Jules Jordan Video	Ass Hunt - Seymore Butts
2007	Rump Riders - Seymore Butts/Pure Play Media	Assploitations - Mayhem
2020	Tushy Raw V12 - TushyRaw.com	
2021		Tushy Raw #19 - Tushy.com

=== Best BBW Performer ===
Year	Fan's Choice	Editor's Choice
2013	Kelly Shibari	Julie Cash
2014	Kelly Shibari	Lexxi Luxe
2015	April Flores	Becki Butterfly
2016	Becki Butterfly	Samantha 38G

=== Best BBW Release ===
Year	Fan's Choice	Editor's Choice
2013	Kelly Shibari Is Overloaded - Kelly Shibari Entertainment	Big Girls Are Sexy 3 - New Sensations
2014	Big Girls Are Sexy 4 - New Sensations	Home Alone Chubbies - Sensational Video
2015	jessica drake’s Guide to Wicked Sex: Plus Size - Wicked Pictures	Sara Jay Likes Her Girls BBW - Wyde Syde Productions

=== Best Body ===
Year	Fan's Choice	Editor's Choice
2012	Riley Steele	Chanel Preston
2013	Riley Steele	Lexi Belle
2014	Riley Steele	Asa Akira
2015	Riley Steele	Adriana Chechik
2016	Riley Steele	Jessa Rhodes
2017	Riley Steele	Jillian Janson
2018	Lana Rhoades	Ariana Marie
2019	Riley Steele	Alexis Fawx

=== Best Boobs ===
Year	Fan's Choice	Editor's Choice
2012	Sara Jay	Charlee Chase
2013	Kelly Madison	Sophie Dee
2014	Vicky Vette	Allison Moore
2015	Britney Amber	Romi Rain
2016	Keisha Grey	Angela White
2017	Angela White	August Ames
2018	Angela White	Kagney Linn Karter
2019	Karma Rx	Angela White

=== Best Butt ===
Year	Fan's Choice	Editor's Choice
2012	Alexis Texas	Asa Akira
2013	Jessie Rogers	Nikki Delano
2014	Maddy O'Reilly	Nikki Delano
2015	Alexis Texas	A.J. Applegate
2016	Megan Rain	Nikki Delano
2017	Nikki Delano	Abella Danger
2018	Ivy LaBelle	Abella Danger
2019	Abella Danger	Luna Star

=== Best Compilation Release ===
Year	Fan's Choice	Editor's Choice
2011	25 Sexiest Asses Ever - Elegant Angel	Adam & Eve’s 40th Anniversary - Adam & Eve

=== Best Cam Model, Individual Site ===
Year	Fan's Choice	Editor's Choice
2012	TheLisaAnn.com	JoAnnaAngel.com
2017	Kissa Sins	Jenny Blighe

=== Best Cougar/MILF Release ===
Year	Fan's Choice	Editor's Choice
2011	My Friend’s Hot Mom 23 - Naughty America	Mommy Got Boobs 10 - Brazzers
2012	My Friend's Hot Mom 30 - Naughty America/Pure Play	Mothers & Daughters - Digital Playground
2013	Pure MILFs 3 - Ogee Studios	Cougars vs Kittens - Wicked Pictures
2014	MILFs Like it Big - Brazzers	My Friend’s Hot Mom #42 - Naughty America

=== Best Director ===
Year	Fan's Choice	Editor's Choice
2002	Brad Armstrong	
2003	Sean Michaels	Chloe
2004	Justin Sterling	Pat Myne
2005	John Stagliano	Michael Ninn
2006	Jules Jordan	James Avalon
2007	Robby D.	Eli Cross
2008	Stormy Daniels	Jules Jordan
2009	Jules Jordan	Stormy Daniels
2010	Jules Jordan	Axel Braun
2011	Axel Braun	Joanna Angel

=== Best Director — Feature ===
Year	Fan's Choice	Editor's Choice
2014	Brad Armstrong	Jacky St. James
2015	Eli Cross	Brad Armstrong
2016	Stormy Daniels	Kay Brandt
2017	Brad Armstrong	Jacky St. James
2018	Kay Brandt	Will Ryder
2020	Kayden Cross	
2021	Kayden Kriss	Axel Braun

=== Best Director — Non-Feature ===
Year	Fan's Choice	Editor's Choice
2014	Manuel Ferrara	Mason
2015	Jules Jordan	Rocco Siffredi
2016	Mason	Greg Lansky
2017	Jules Jordan	Axel Braun
2018	Axel Braun	Greg Lansky
2019	Jonni Darkko	Joanna Angel
2020	Jules Jordan	
2021	Jules Jordan	
2023	Kayden Kross	
2024	Kayden Kross	

=== Best Director – Non-Parody ===
Year	Fan's Choice	Editor's Choice
2012	Belladonna	Stormy Daniels
2013	Brad Armstrong	Dana Vespoli

=== Best Director — Parody ===
Year	Fan's Choice	Editor's Choice
2012	Axel Braun	Will Ryder
2013	Axel Braun	Will Ryder
2014	Axel Braun	Will Ryder
2015	Axel Braun	Will Ryder
2016	Axel Braun	Will Ryder
2017	Axel Braun	Joanna Angel

=== Best DVD ===
Year	Fan's Choice	Editor's Choice
2003	Rush - Digital Playground	Hercules - Wicked Pictures

=== Best Ethnic Performer ===
Year	Fan's Choice	Editor's Choice
2013	Asa Akira	Misty Stone

=== Best Ethnic Release ===
Year	Fan's Choice	Editor's Choice
2016	Black & White - Blacked.com	Black Owner - Jules Jordan
2017	Kendra's Obsession - Blacked.com	Latin Asses #3 - Hard X
2018	Black & White #12 - Blacked.com	Interracial Anal #4 - Dark X

=== Best Feature Dancer ===
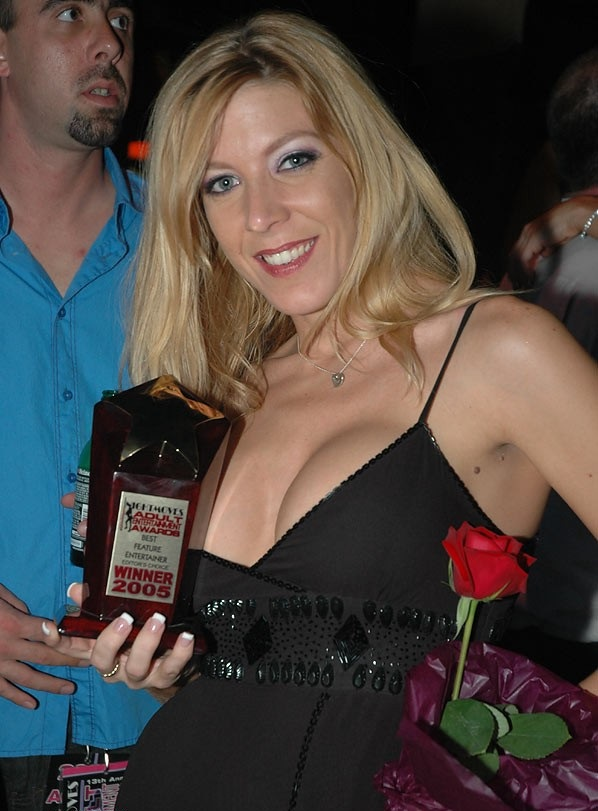
Lexi Lamour holding her Best Feature Dancer trophy at the 2005 NightMoves Awards Show

Year	Fan's Choice	Editor's Choice
2002	Gina Lynn	
2003	Felicia Fox	Teri Weigel
2004	Lori Alexia	Devon Michaels
2005	Tyler Faith	Lexi Lamour
2006	Alexis Amore	Vivian West
2007	Stormy Daniels	Gina Lynn
2008	Sunny Lane	Teagan Presley
2009	Teagan Presley	Jenna Haze
2010	Jesse Jane	Daisy Duxe
2011	Jenna Haze	Nikki Benz
2012	Nikki Benz	Prinzzess Felicity Jade
2013	Christina Aguchi	Gia Nova
2014	Lexi Belle	Richelle Ryan
2015	Nikki Delano	Richelle Ryan
2016	Jillian Janson	Richelle Ryan
2017	Adriana Chechik	Angela Sommers
2018	Adriana Chechik	Nikki Delano
2019	Elsa Jean	Jillian Janson
2024	Ginger Wolfe	
2025	Hayla Faye	

=== Best Feature Production ===
Year	Fan's Choice	Editor's Choice
1995	Sex 2 - VCA Pictures	
1996	Shock - VCA Pictures	
1997	Satyr - Wicked Pictures	
1998	Zazel - CalVista	Anna Malle’s Wildlife - Midnight Video
1999	Tampa Tushy - Seymore Butts	Double Feature - Wicked Pictures
2000	DreamQuest - Wicked Pictures	Sex Island - Adam & Eve
2001	Vengeance - Wicked Pictures	The Fiesta - Adam & Eve
2002	Devon Stripped - Digital Playground	Serenity’s Roman Orgy - Wicked Pictures
2003	Jenna Loves Kobe - Vivid Entertainment	Riptide - Sin City
2004	Bella Loves Jenna - ClubJenna	Rawhide - Adam & Eve
2005	The Masseuse - ClubJenna/Vivid Entertainment	Contract Star - Digital Playground
2006	Pirates - Digital Playground/Adam & Eve	Dark Angels 2 - New Sensations
2007	Corruption - SexZ Pictures	The New Neighbors - Sllab
2008	Upload - SexZ Pictures	Cheerleaders - Digital Playground
2009	Pirates II: Stagnetti's Revenge - Digital Playground	Fallen - Wicked Pictures
2010	Teachers - Digital Playground	Pornstar Superheros - Elegant Angel
2011	Top Guns - Digital Playground	Justice League of Porn Star Heroes - Extreme Comixxx
2012	Fighters - Digital Playground	Portrait of a Call Girl - Elegant Angel
2013	Code of Honor - Digital Playground	Wasteland - Elegant Angel
2014	New Behind the Green Door - Vivid Entertainment	Hot Chicks Big Fangs - Digital Playground
2015	Second Chances - New Sensations	Holly Would - Wicked Pictures
2016	Love, Sex, & TV News - Adam & Eve	Wanted - Wicked Pictures
2017	Preacher’s Daughter - Wicked Pictures	The Proposal - New Sensations
2018	The Psychiatrist - Pure Taboo	CamGirl - Wicked Pictures
2020		Captain Marvel XXX: An Axel Braun Parody - Wicked Pictures
2021		Muse - Deeper Studio

=== Best Female Performer ===
Year	Fan's Choice	Editor's Choice
2008	Bree Olson	Kaylani Lei
2009	Bree Olson	Jessica Drake
2010	Kayden Kross	Teagan Presley
2011	Alexis Texas	Chanel Preston
2012	Jesse Jane	Lexi Belle
2013	Chanel Preston	Britney Amber
2014	Bonnie Rotten	Remy LaCroix
2015	Annika Albright	Jillian Janson
2016	Adriana Chechik	Abella Danger
2017	Adriana Chechik	Eva Lovia
2018	Sarah Vandella	Britney Amber
2019	Adriana Chechik	Kenzie Taylor
2020	Adriana Chechik	Emily Willis
2021	Adriana Chechik	Brooklyn Chase
2022	Blake Blossom	
2023	Angela White	
2024	Cherry Kiss	
2025	Leana Lovings	
2026	Jennifer White	

=== Best Fetish/Specialty Release ===
Year	Fan's Choice	Editor's Choice
2014	Bonnie Rotten Is Squirtwoman - Elegant Angel	Ass Hats - LeWood Productions/Evil Angel
2015	Liquid Lesbians - Evil Angel	Fetish Fantasies - Erotica X
2016	Father Daughter Seductions 2 - Desperate Pleasures	Fifty Shades of Sara Jay - Wyde Syde Productions
2017	Hot Wife Blindfolded #3 - New Sensations	School Girl Bound - Digital Sin
2018	Hardcore Gangbang Parodies #3 - Kink.com	Forbidden Sex #2 - New Sensations
2020	Please F*ck My Wife - New Sensations	
2021		It's A Mommy Thing! #11 - Elegant Angel

=== Best Girl/Girl Performer ===
Year	Fan's Choice	Editor's Choice
2018	Charlotte Stokely	Darcie Dolce
2019	Charlotte Stokely	Jenna Sativa
2020	Charlotte Stokely	
2021	Kenna James	Alex Coal
2022	Lauren Phillips	
2023	Aidra Fox	
2024	Lauren Phillips	
2025	Kylie Rocket	
2026	Leana Lovings	

=== Best Individual Website ===
Year	Fan's Choice	Editor's Choice
2012	TheLisaAnn.com	JoannaAngel.com

=== Best Ink ===
Year	Fan's Choice	Editor's Choice
2013	Bonnie Rotten	Joanna Angel
2014	Romi Rain	Bonnie Rotten
2015	Bonnie Rotten	Kleio Valentien
2018	Karma Rx	Romi Rain

=== Best Interracial/Ethnic Series ===
Year	Fan's Choice	Editor's Choice
2004	Asian Fever	Whoriental Sex Academy

=== Best Latina Performer ===
Year	Fan's Choice	Editor's Choice
2012	Abella Anderson	Nikki Delano

=== Best Live Webcam ===
Year	Fan's Choice	Editor's Choice
2017	Chaturbate	MyFreeCams
2018	Chaturbate	Camsoda

=== Best Male Performer ===
Year	Fan's Choice	Editor's Choice
2008	Tommy Gunn	Evan Stone
2009	Derrick Pierce	Evan Stone
2010	Evan Stone	James Deen
2011	Evan Stone	Tommy Gunn
2012	James Deen	Brendon Miller
2013	Manuel Ferrara	Erik Everhard
2014	Erik Everhard	James Deen
2015	Ryan Driller	Steven St Croix
2016	Seth Gamble	Manuel Ferrara
2017	Xander Corvus	Mick Blue
2018	Markus Dupree	Xander Corvus
2019	Charles Dera	Ramon Nomar
2020	Manuel Ferrara	
2021		Manuel Ferrara

=== Best MILF Performer ===
Year	Fan's Choice	Editor's Choice
2010	Vicky Vette	Tanya Tate
2011	Francesca Lé	Priya Rai
2012	Lisa Ann	Tanya Tate
2013	Julia Ann	Brandi Love
2014	Lisa Ann	Tanya Tate
2015	Kendra Lust	Ava Addams
2016	Kendra Lust	Tanya Tate
2017	Kendra Lust	Tanya Tate
2018	Brandi Love	Bridgette B
2019	Bridgette B	Brandi Love
2020	Brandi Love	
2021	Alexis Fawx	Rachael Cavalli
2022	Rachel Starr	
2023	Natasha Nice	
2024	Penny Barber	
2025	GiGi Dior	
2026	Lauren Phillips	

=== Best MILF Release ===
Year	Fan's Choice	Editor's Choice
2011	My Friend’s Hot Mom #23 - Naughty America	Mommy Got Boobs #10 - Brazzers
2012	My Friend’s Hot Mom #30 - Naughty America	Mothers & Daughters - Digital Playground
2013	Pure MILF’s #3 - Ogee Studios	My Friend’s Hot Mom #42 - Naughty America
2015	MILF Soup #39 - Bangbros	MILF Performers of the Year 2015 - Elegant Angel

=== Best New Director ===
Year	Fan's Choice	Editor's Choice
2005	Celeste	Stormy Daniels
2006	Tommy Gunn	Kimberly Kane

=== Best New Production Company ===
Year	Fan's Choice	Editor's Choice
2004	Zero Tolerance Entertainment	Nectar
2005	Gina Lynn Productions	Acid Rain
2006	Vouyer Media	Black Ice Limited

=== Best New Starlet ===
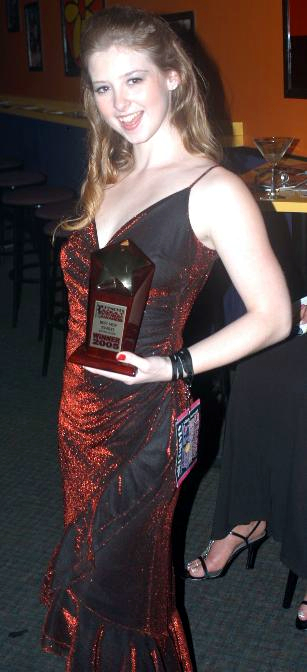
Sunny Lane holding her Best New Starlet trophy at the 2005 NightMoves Awards Show

Year	Fan's Choice	Editor's Choice
1995	Jenna Jameson	
1996	Missy	
1997	Lovette	
1998	Jessica Darlin	Alisha Klass
1999	Claudia Chase	Jewel De'Nyle
2000	Inari Vachs	Tera Patrick
2001	Briana Banks	Ryan Conner
2002	Hannah Harper	Calli Cox
2003	Carmen Luvana	Jesse Jane
2004	Avy Scott	Krystal Steal
2005	Keri Sable	Sunny Lane
2006	Jenna Presley	Taryn Thomas
2007	Shay Jordan	Bree Olson
2008	Alexis Texas	Moxxie Maddron
2009	Jayden Jaymes	Angelina Armani
2010	Raven Alexis	Chanel Preston
2011	Abella Anderson	Allie Haze
2012	Adrianna Luna	Riley Reid
2013	Anikka Albrite	Rikki Six
2014	Carter Cruise	Keisha Grey
2015	Summer Carter	Morgan Lee
2016	Kenzie Taylor	Adria Rae
2017	Lana Rhoades	Sofi Ryan
2018	Ella Knox	Avi Love
2019	Lacy Lennon	Victoria Voxxx
2020	Bella Rolland	Kit Mercer
2021	Skylar Vox	Blake Blossom
2022	Kenzie Anne	
2023	Nicole Doshi	
2024	Hailey Rose	
2025	Gal Ritchie	
2026	Ivy Ireland	

=== Best Parody (Comedy) ===
Year	Fan's Choice	Editor's Choice
2007	Pulp Friction - Adam & Eve	The Da Vinci Load 2 - Hustler Video
2008	Operation Desert Stormy - Wicked Pictures	Not the Bradys XXX - X-Play/Hustler Video
2009	The Office: A XXX Parody - New Sensations	Not The Cosbys XXX - Hustler Video
2010	Batman XXX: A Porn Parody - Vivid Entertainment	Big Bang Theory: A XXX Parody - New Sensations
2011	Superman XXX: A Porn Parody - Vivid Entertainment	Rocki Whore Picture Show - Wicked Pictures
2012	Star Wars XXX: A Porn Parody - Axel Braun/Vivid Entertainment	Beverly Hillbillies: A XXX Parody - X-Play/Adam & Eve
2013	The Karate Kid XXX - DreamZone Entertainment	Not Animal House XXX - Adam & Eve
2014	This Ain’t Star Trek XXX #3 - Hustler Video	The Little Spermaid XXX - DreamZone Entertainment
2015	Barbarella XXX:An Axel Braun Parody - Vivid Entertainment	Sisters of Anarchy - Digital Playground
2016	Peter Pan XXX: An Axel Braun Parody - Wicked Pictures	Beauty and the Beast XXX - Exquisite Pleasures
2017	Suicide Squad XXX: An Axel Braun Production - Wicked Pictures	Star Wars Underworld - Digital Playground
2018	Justice League XXX: An Axel Braun Production - Wicked Pictures	Queen of Thrones - Brazzers

=== Best Parody (Drama) ===
Year	Fan's Choice	Editor's Choice
2012	Rocky XXX: A Parody Thriller! - X-Play/Adam & Eve	Zorro XXX: A Pleasure Dynasty Parody - Jama/Pleasure Dynasty/Exile
2013	This Ain’t Avatar 2 XXX: Escape from Pandwhora - Hustler Video	Breaking Bad XXX: A Sweet Mess Films Parody - Exquisite Films
2014	Snow White XXX: An Axel Braun Parody - Wicked Pictures	Rambone XXX - DreamZone Entertainment

=== Best Parody Release ===
Year	Fan's Choice	Editor's Choice
2015	Barbarella XXX: An Axel Braun Parody - Vivid Entertainment	Sisters of Anarchy - Digital Playground
2016	Peter Pan XXX: An Axel Braun Parody - Wicked Pictures	Beauty and the Beast XXX - Exquisite Pleasures

=== Best Parody (Superhero) ===
Year	Fan's Choice	Editor's Choice
2012	The Avengers XXX: A Porn Parody - VividXXXSuperheroes	Tomb Raider XXX: An Exquisite Films Parody - Paradox/Exquisite
2013	The Dark Knight XXX - Vivid Entertainment	Superman vs Spiderman XXX - Vivid Entertainment
2014	Captain America XXX: An Axel Braun Parody - Vivid Entertainment	Spiderman XXX #2: An Axel Braun Parody - Vivid Entertainment

=== Best Production Company ===
Year	Fan's Choice	Editor's Choice
2000	Wicked Pictures	
2001	Adam & Eve	
2002	Digital Playground	Wicked Pictures
2003	Evil Angel	Sin City
2004	Digital Playground	Private Media Group
2005	Digital Playground	ClubJenna
2006	ClubJenna	Zero Tolerance Entertainment
2007	Digital Playground	Wicked Pictures
2008	Digital Playground	Hustler Video
2009	Brazzers	Wicked Pictures
2010	Digital Playground	Hustler Video
2011	Digital Playground	Wicked Pictures
2012	Brazzers	Girlfriends Films
2013	Wicked Pictures	Naughty America
2014	Wicked Pictures	Vivid Entertainment
2015	Evil Angel	Wicked Pictures
2016	Blacked	Girlfriends Films
2017	No Award Presented	
2018	Blacked	Adam & Eve
2020	Vixen Media Group	
2021	Mile High Media	

=== Best Series ===
Year	Fan's Choice	Editor's Choice
2003	Barely Legal - Hustler Video	No Man’s Land - Video Team
2004	Dream Girls Adventures - Dream Girls	Jack's Playground - Digital Playground
2005	Jack's Playground - Digital Playground	Anal Expedition - Red Light District Video
2006	Where The Boys Aren't - Vivid Entertainment	Barely Legal - Hustler Video
2007	Island Fever - Digital Playground	College Invasion - Shane's World
2008	Jack's Playground - Digital Playground	Couples Seduce Teens - Pink Visual
2009	Jack's Playground - Digital Playground	Big Wet Asses - Elegant Angel
2010	Bang Bus - Bang Bros	My Friend's Hot Mom - Naughty America
2013	RAW - Evil Angel	Women Seeking Women - Girlfriends Films
2014	RAW - Evil Angel	Performers of the Year - Elegant Angel
2015	Tonight's Girlfriend - Naughty America	Pure - Airerose Entertainment
2016	My Sister's Hot Friends - Naughty America	Performers of the Year - Elegant Angel
2017	Women Seeking Women - Girlfriends Films	Tonight’s Girlfriend - Naughty America
2018	No Award Presented	

=== Best Star Showcase ===
Year	Fan's Choice	Editor's Choice
2017	Lana - Tushy	Riley Reid Overexposed - Adam & Eve
2018	The Ultimate Fuck Toy: Jill Kassidy - Jules Jordan	Tori Black is Back - Lesbian X

=== Best Transsexual Director ===
Year	Fan's Choice	Editor's Choice
2018	Dana Vespoli	Aiden Starr
2019	Dana Vespoli	Ricky Greenwood

=== Best Transexual Performer ===
Year	Fan's Choice	Editor's Choice
2012	Tiffany Starr	Mia Isabella
2013	Sarina Valentina	Amy Daly
2014	Venus Lux	Jane Marie
2015	Jessy Dubai	TS Foxxy
2016	Isabella Sorrenti	Jessy Dubai
2017	Jessy Dubai	Aubrey Kate
2019	Foxxy	Natalie Mars
2020	Natalie Mars	
2021	Aubrey Kate	

=== Best Transexual Release ===
Year	Fan's Choice	Editor's Choice
2012	America's Next Top Tranny 15 - Devil's Film	Rogue Adventures 37 - Joey Silvera/Evil Angel
2013	Forbidden Lovers - Trans-Romantic Films	American She-Male 2 - Evil Angel
2014	America’s Next Top Tranny #19 - Goodfellas	TS, I Love You - Dana Vespoli/Evil Angel
2015	Transsexual Babysitters #27 - Devil's Film	American Tranny #4 - Reality Junkies
2016	Transsexual Babysitters #28 - Devil's Film	Aubrey Kate’s TS Fantasies - Transsensual
2017	No Award Presented	
2018	TS Factor #10 - Evil Angel	Trans Massage - Gender X
2021		Daisy Taylor TS Superstar - Grooby

=== Best Video Packaging ===
Year	Fan's Choice	Editor's Choice
2010	2040 - Wicked Pictures	The 8th Day - Adam & Eve

=== Unsung Performer of the Year ===
Year	Fan's Choice	Editor's Choice
2017	Dillion Harper	Adria Rae
2018	Elsa Jean	Lauren Phillips
2019	Gina Valentina	Kenzie Reeves

=== First Choice Awards ===
Year	Film	Company
2005	Pirates	Digital Playground/Adam & Eve
2005	Catherine	Ninn Worx
2006	Tailgunners	Adam & Eve
2006	Fashionistas Safado: The Challenge	Evil Angel
2007	Operation: Desert Stormy	Wicked Pictures
2007	Not the Bradys XXX	X-Play/Hustler Video
2008	Pirates II: Stagnetti's Revenge	Digital Playground
2008	This Ain't the Munsters XXX	Hustler Video
2009	2040	Wicked Pictures
2009	The 8th Day	Adam & Eve
2010	Body Heat	Digital Playground
2010	Speed	Wicked Pictures
2010	This Ain't Avatar XXX 3D	Hustler Video
2011	Spider-Man XXX: A Porn Parody	Vivid Entertainment
2011	Rocky XXX: A Parody Thriller	X-Play/Adam & Eve
2011	Spartacus XXX: The Beginning	Miko Lee Productions/London-Gunn Productions/Wicked Pictures
2012	Men in Black: A Hardcore Parody	Wicked Pictures
2012	D3viance	Rockstar/skinworXXX/Adam & Eve
2012	Not Animal House XXX	X-Play/Adam & Eve
2012	The Dark Knight XXX: A Porn Parody	VividXXXSuperheroes
2013	Not the Wizard of Oz XXX	X-Play
2013	Wanderlust	Wicked Pictures
2013	The New Behind the Green Door	Vivid Entertainment
2014	Sleeping Beauty XXX: An Axel Braun Parody	Wicked Pictures
2014	Not Jersey Boys XXX: A Porn Musical	X-Play Video
2014	Wetwork	Vivid Entertainment
2015	Peter Pan XXX: An Axel Braun Parody	Wicked Fairy Tales/Wicked Pictures
2015	Sleeping with Danger	DreamZone Entertainment
2015	Wanted	Wicked Pictures/Adam & Eve
2016	Babysitting the Baumgartners	Adam & Eve
2016	Suicide Squad XXX: An Axel Braun Parody	Wicked Comix
2016	Not Traci Lords XXX: '80s Superstars Reborn	X-Play / Pulse
2017	Bad Babes, Inc.	Adam & Eve
2017	Justice League XXX – Axel Braun Productions Unbridled	Wicked Pictures
2017	The Submission of Emma Marx: Evolved	New Sensations
2021	Love, Sex & Lawyers - Adam & Eve Pictures	Black Widow XXX : An Axel Braun Parody - Wicked Comix

=== Industry Ambassador Award ===
Year	Recipient
2025	Lauren Phillips
2026	Jeremy (The Red Room)

=== Lifetime Achievement Award ===
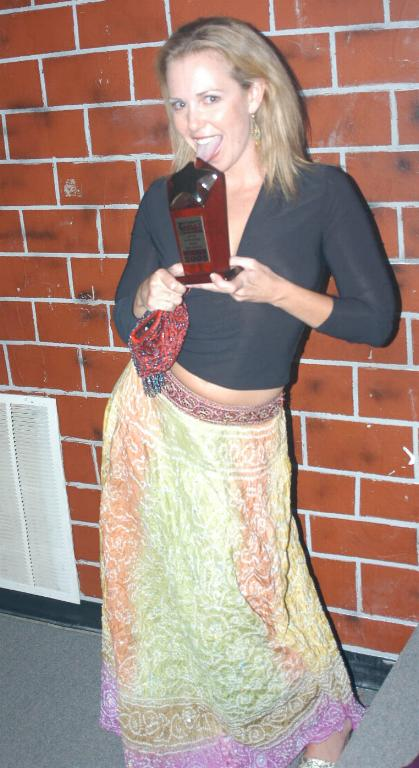
Holly Randall holding her mother's (Suze Randall) Lifetime Achievement Award trophy, which she accepted on her behalf at the 2005 NightMoves Awards Show

Year	Recipient
1997	Ron Jeremy
1998	Randy West
1999	Peter North
2000	Seymore Butts
2001	Larry Flynt
2001	Jimmy Flynt
2002	Ginger Lynn
2002	Paul Fishbein
2003	Dennis Hof
2005	Suze Randall
2006	Randy Spears
2007	Dennis Hof
2008	Steve Orenstein
2009	Will Ryder
2010	Cousin Stevie
2011	James Bartholet
2012	Axel Braun
2013	Steven St. Croix
2014	Tony Batman
2015	Dan O'Connell
2016	Evan Stone
2017	Greg Lansky
2018	Kay Brandt
2019	Johnathan Morgan
2022	Miles Long
2023	Michael Mark
2024	Conor Coxxx

=== Miss Congeniality ===
Year	Recipient
2001	Anna D. Caans
2004	Olivia O'Lovely
2005	Maya Divine
2006	Sunny Lane
2010	Nicki Hunter
2012	Bonnie Rotten
2013	Danica Dillon
2014	Aiden Ashley
2014	Dillion Harper
2015	Kendra Sunderland
2016	Lauren Phillips
2017	Lexi Luna
2018	Della Dane
2019	Dinah Might
2020	Heather Heaven
2021	Ms. Parker
2022	Kleio Valentien
2023	Dora Kola
2024	Stephanie Love
2025	Caitlyn Baby
2026	Taylor Nicole

=== NightMoves Hall of Fame ===
Year	Recipient
2007	Alisha Klass
2007	Anna Malle
2007	Chloe
2007	Gina Lynn
2007	Ginger Lynn
2007	Jenna Jameson
2007	Jewel De'Nyle
2007	Jill Kelly
2007	Serenity
2007	Stormy Daniels
2007	Tera Patrick
2007	Randy West
2007	Ron Jeremy
2007	Sean Michaels
2007	Seymore Butts
2008	Belladonna
2008	Carmen Luvana
2008	Jesse Jane
2009	Jessica Drake
2009	Kylie Ireland
2009	Tommy Gunn
2010	Dennis Hof
2011	Erica McLean
2011	Rebecca Bardoux
2012	Vicky Vette
2012	Tony Batman
2013	Joanna Angel
2013	Barrett Blade
2014	Sunny Lane
2014	Axel Braun
2015	Julia Ann
2015	Misty Stone
2015	Prinzzess Felicity Jade
2016	Gia Nova
2016	Will Ryder
2017	Nikki Delano
2017	James Bartholet
2018	Adriana Chechik
2018	Katie Sutra
2019	Jillian Janson
2019	Flynt Dominic
2020	Lauren Phillips
2021	Miles Long
2022	Janine Jericho
2022	Rachel Starr
2023	Shelby Doll
2023	Bob Krotts
2023	Derek Hay
2025	Eva Angelina
2026	Micky Lynn
2026	Slava Siderman

=== Social Media Star ===
Year	Fan's Choice	Editor's Choice
2011	Vicky Vette	Bree Olson
2012	Vicky Vette	Tori Black
2013	Bonnie Rotten	Lisa Ann
2014	No Award Presented	
2015	No Award Presented	
2016	Kendra Sunderland	Lelu Love
2017	Anna Belle Peaks	Lauren Phillips
2018	Nicolette Shea	Tori Black
2019	Riley Reid	Lauren Phillips

=== Triple Play Award ===
Year	Recipient
2006	Michael Obama
2007	Kylie Ireland
2008	Belladonna
2009	Gina Lynn
2010	Jessica Drake
2011	Marcus London
2012	Joanna Angel
2013	Seymore Butts
2014	Kelly Shibari
2015	James Bartholet
2016	Bonnie Rotten
2017	Tanya Tate
2018	Sara Jay
2019	Miles Long
2023	Lauren Phillips

=== Behind The Scenes Award ===
Year	Recipient
2019	James Bartholet
