= Kagney Linn Karter =

American pornographic film actress (1987–2024)

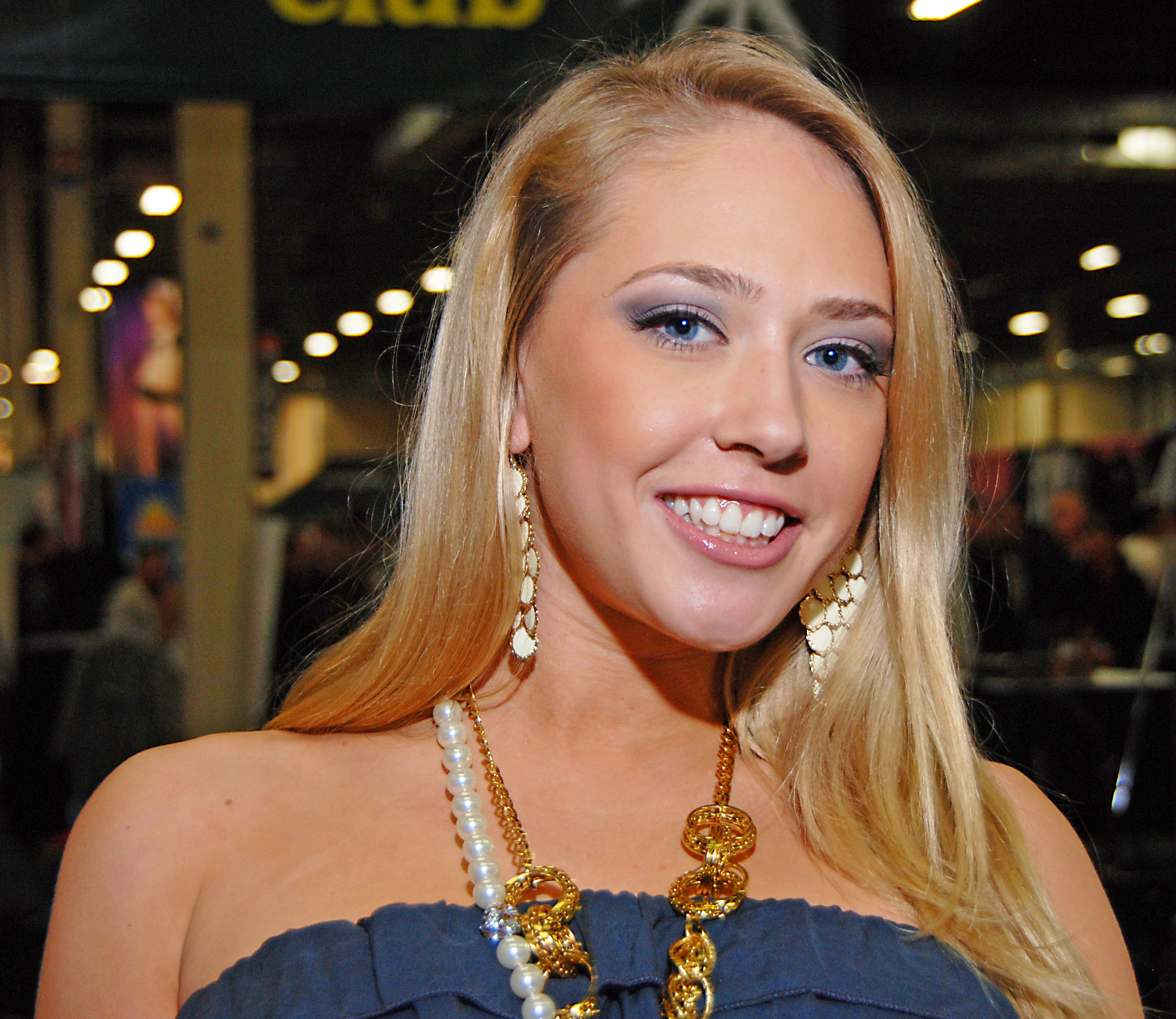
- Karter in 2010
- Born: March 28, 1987; Harris County, Texas, U.S.
- Died: February 15, 2024 (aged 36); Cuyahoga County, Ohio, U.S.
- Occupations: Pornographic film actress; exotic dancer

Kagney Linn Karter (March 28, 1987 – February 15, 2024) was an American pornographic film actress and stripper. After moving to California from Missouri to pursue an acting and singing career, she posed for erotic photographer Holly Randall and appeared in adult films from Naughty America and Elegant Angel. In 2010, she became an exclusive contract performer for Zero Tolerance Entertainment. She also appeared in the magazines Penthouse and Hustler.

== Early life ==
Kagney Linn Karter was born in Harris County, Texas, on March 28, 1987. She grew up in St. Joseph, Missouri, and Ridgway, Pennsylvania.

== Career ==
Karter worked as a stripper while in Missouri and was named the state's Déjà Vu Showgirl of the Year in 2007.

She later moved to California to pursue an acting and singing career. Karter fell out with her manager when he discovered she was also working as an exotic dancer. While continuing to dance, she eventually moved into modeling and, after signing with the agency LA Direct Models, posed in photo shoots for erotic photographer Holly Randall.

Karter entered the adult film industry in September 2008. Her first scene was with Johnny Sins for Naughty America. In 2009, she was chosen as the Penthouse Pet of the Month for June, and appeared on the covers of Hustler in April and Adult Video News, also in June. Karter was also featured on the cover of Holly Randall's photo book Erotic Dream Girls published in October 2009. In January 2010, she signed an exclusive performing contract with the production company Zero Tolerance Entertainment. She also appeared in films from Elegant Angel.

Karter starred in the pornographic parody films Not Married With Children XXX (2009), directed by Will Ryder, and Official Silence of the Lambs Parody (2011). She appeared in Louis Theroux's documentary film Twilight of the Porn Stars (2012), which revealed that she performed webcam shows to supplement her income from the pornography industry. She continued to occasionally perform in adult films until the year before her death in 2024. She was posthumously inducted into the XRCO Hall of Fame and AVN Hall of Fame.

== Death ==
On February 15, 2024, at the age of 36, Karter died from a self-inflicted shotgun wound at her home near Cleveland, Ohio.

== Awards ==
List of accolades received by Kagney Linn Karter
Awards & nominations
Award	Won	Nominated
AVN Awards	4	26
XRCO Awards	2	2
XBIZ Awards	1	–
NightMoves Awards	1	–
Urban X Awards	1	–
- Total number of wins and nominations
Totals	9	37

Year	Ceremony	Category	Work
2010	AVN Award	Best New Starlet	—N/a
2010	AVN Award	Best POV Sex Scene	Pound the Round POV
2010	XBIZ Award	New Starlet of the Year	—N/a
2010	XRCO Award	Best New Starlet	—N/a
2012	Urban X Award	Best Anal Sex Scene (with Prince Yahshua)	Prince the Penetrator (2012)
2014	AVN Award	Best Boobs (Fan Award)	—N/a
2018	NightMoves Award	Best Boobs (Editor's Choice)	—N/a
2024	XRCO Award	Hall of Fame	—N/a
2025	AVN Award	Hall of Fame	—N/a
