= Kelly Shibari =

Japanese-born pornographic film actress and model (born 1972)

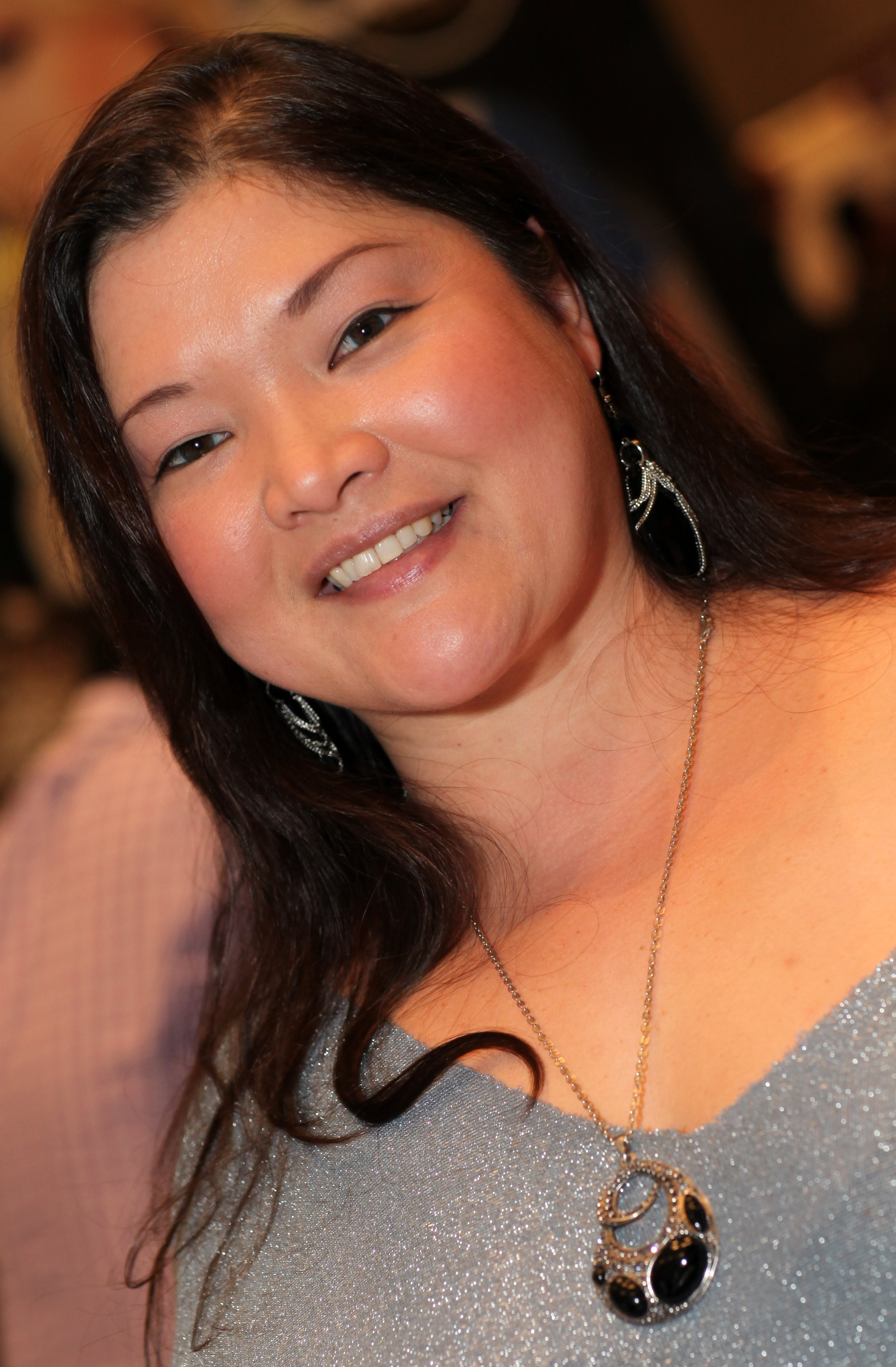
- Shibari at the AVN Adult Entertainment Expo in 2013
- Born: 1972 (age 53–54); Japan

Kelly Shibari (born 1972) is a Japanese and American pornographic film actress and plus-size model.

== Early life ==
Shibari was born and raised in Japan. At the age of 15, she moved to the United States to attend college. She speaks fluent Japanese and English.

Shibari does not have a high school diploma because she was admitted to college early at the age of 16. She graduated with a degree in marketing.

After graduation, Shibari worked as a roadie for rock bands and Broadway shows. After settling in Los Angeles, she worked as a production designer on Hollywood films; she left the industry due to a lack of work during the 2007–08 Writers Guild of America strike.

== Career ==
Shibari entered the adult film industry in 2007 after sending photos of herself to The Score Group. In June 2014, she became the first plus-size model to appear on the cover of Penthouse Forum magazine. In January 2016, Shibari made history as the first-ever plus-size woman to pose for Penthouse magazine; she was featured in the spread called "The Girl Show," alongside two other models in a sideshow circus-inspired photo series.

== Mainstream media appearances ==
Shibari appeared in the music video for the song "Mein Land" by Rammstein, which premiered on November 11, 2011. In 2014, she also appeared in the series finale of Sons of Anarchy.

== Awards and nominations ==
Year	Ceremony	Result	Category	Work
2010	Urban X Award	Nominated	BBW of the Year	—N/a
2011	Feminist Porn Award	Won	Honoured Website	PaddedKink.com
2013	NightMoves Award	Won	Best BBW Performer (Fan's Choice)	—N/a
2013	NightMoves Award	Won	Best BBW Release (Fan's Choice)	Kelly Shibari is Overloaded
2013	Fanny Award	Won	BBW Performer of the Year	—N/a
2014	AVN Award	Nominated	BBW Performer of the Year	—N/a
2014	NightMoves Award	Won	Best BBW Performer (Fan's Choice)	—N/a
2014	NightMoves Award	Won	The Triple Play Award	—N/a
2014	XBIZ Award	Nominated	Best Non-Sex Acting Performance	Summer Loving
2014	Fanny Award	Won	BBW Performer of the Year	—N/a
2014	Inked Award	Won	BBW of the Year	—N/a
2015	AVN Award	Nominated	BBW Performer of the Year	—N/a
2015	XBIZ Award	Nominated	Best Scene - Non-Feature Release (with Ramón Nomar)	Big Girls Are Sexy 4
2015	Feminist Porn Award	Won	Smutty School Teacher Award for Sex Education	Jessica Drake's Guide to Wicked Sex: Plus Size
2016	NightMoves Award	Won	The Adella Award	—N/a
2020	Urban X Award	Won	Hall of Fame	—N/a
