= Vicky Vette =

Norwegian-Canadian pornographic film actress

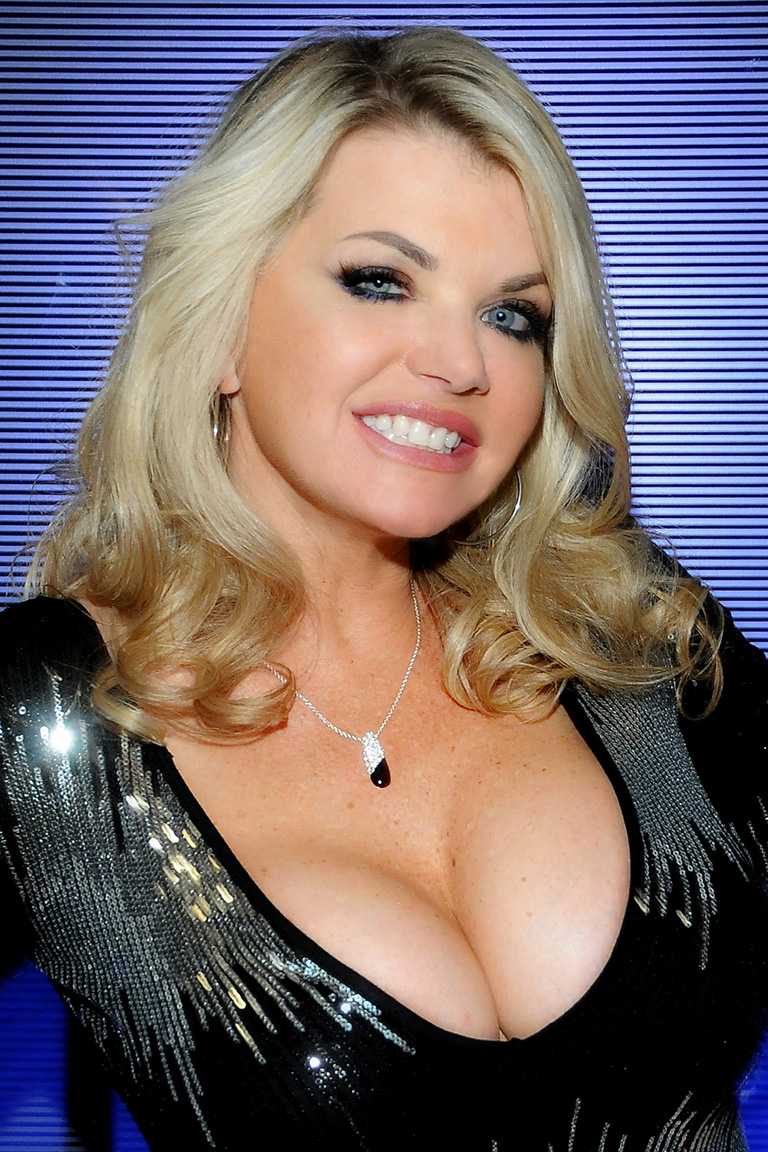
- Vette in 2015
- Born: 12 June 1965 (age 61); Stavanger, Norway
- Occupation: Pornographic film actress
- Website: vickyathome.com

Vicky Vette (born 12 June 1965) is an American pornographic film actress and webcam model.

== Early life ==
Vicky Vette was born on 12 June 1965 in Stavanger, Norway. She moved to Canada at the age of five, later immigrating to the United States in her mid-30s.

Vette worked as an accountant and a housing contractor with her husband prior to her career in adult films.

== Career ==
In 2002, Vette won Hustler magazine's "Beaver Hunt" contest with a photo she submitted of herself. Her first pornographic scene was shot on 31 May 2003, less than two weeks before her 38th birthday.

Vette has a line of adult toys called "Vicky Quickie" distributed by Doc Johnson. She runs a network of adult websites called the VNA Network with stars such as Nikki Benz, Puma Swede, and Julia Ann.

Vette started in an Indonesian erotic horror B movie titled Pacar Hantu Perawan (2011), filming her scenes in the United States. She said she feared for her safety in Indonesia after publicly mocking Indonesian communications minister Tifatul Sembiring, who had declared he would never touch a woman to whom he was not related. In 2012, the newspaper Verdens Gang named Vette the most-followed Norwegian on Twitter.

== Personal life ==
In 2006, it was reported that Vette's husband was found dead in a friend's home, where he was staying; police ruled his death a suicide. The couple had been swingers for over 15 years and performed together in videos and webcam shows for Vette's website. They also lived in a naturist community outside of Atlanta, Georgia.

== Awards ==
Year	Ceremony	Award	Work
2003	Hustler	Beaver Hunt Winner	—N/a
2005	AVN Award	Best Tease Performance	Metropolis
2008	Booble.com	Girl of the Year	—N/a
2010	Fame Registry Award	MILF of the Year	—N/a
2010	Fame Registry Award	Pornstar Website of the Year	—N/a
2010	NightMoves Award	Best MILF (Fan's Choice)	—N/a
2011	FreeOnes.com	Best OCSM	—N/a
2011	Fame Registry Award	Social Network Sensation	—N/a
2011	Fame Registry Award	Sexy Webmistress	—N/a
2011	NightMoves Award	Social Media Star (Fan's Choice)	—N/a
2011	NightMoves Award	Best On-Line Presence (Fan’s Choice)	—N/a
2012	XBIZ Award	Web Babe of the Year	—N/a
2012	FreeOnes.com	Miss FreeOnes	—N/a
2012	Fame Registry Award	Sexy Webmistress	—N/a
2012	NightMoves Award	Social Media Star (Fan's Choice)	—N/a
2012	NightMoves Award	Hall of Fame	—N/a
2013	XBIZ Award	Web Star of the Year	—N/a
2013	Fame Registry Award	Fan Favorite Hottest Blonde	—N/a
2013	AVN	Game Changer	—N/a
2014	AVN Award	Best Solo Girl Website	VickyAtHome.com
2014	NightMoves Award	Best Boobs (Fan's Choice)	—N/a
2016	AVN Award	Best Solo Girl Website	VickyAtHome.com
2016	AVN Award	Hall of Fame	—N/a
