= Lauren Phillips =

Lauren Phillips may refer to:

- Lauren Phillips (Welsh actress)
- Lauren Phillips (American actress)
- Lauren Phillips (Grange Hill)
