= Get Rubber =

The Get Rubber campaign is an STI awareness campaign coordinated by adult entertainment company Brazzers to bring awareness to the risk of unprotected sex and HIV/AIDS. The campaign is centered on the bringing awareness to adult industry consumers using a series of public service announcements featuring adult video stars such as Bree Olson, Rachel_Roxxx and Nikki Benz. The campaign has also included outdoor advertising. It aims to remind consumers of pornographic material that adult content is created in a controlled setting and is not to be imitated irresponsibly.
