= Robby D. =

American film director

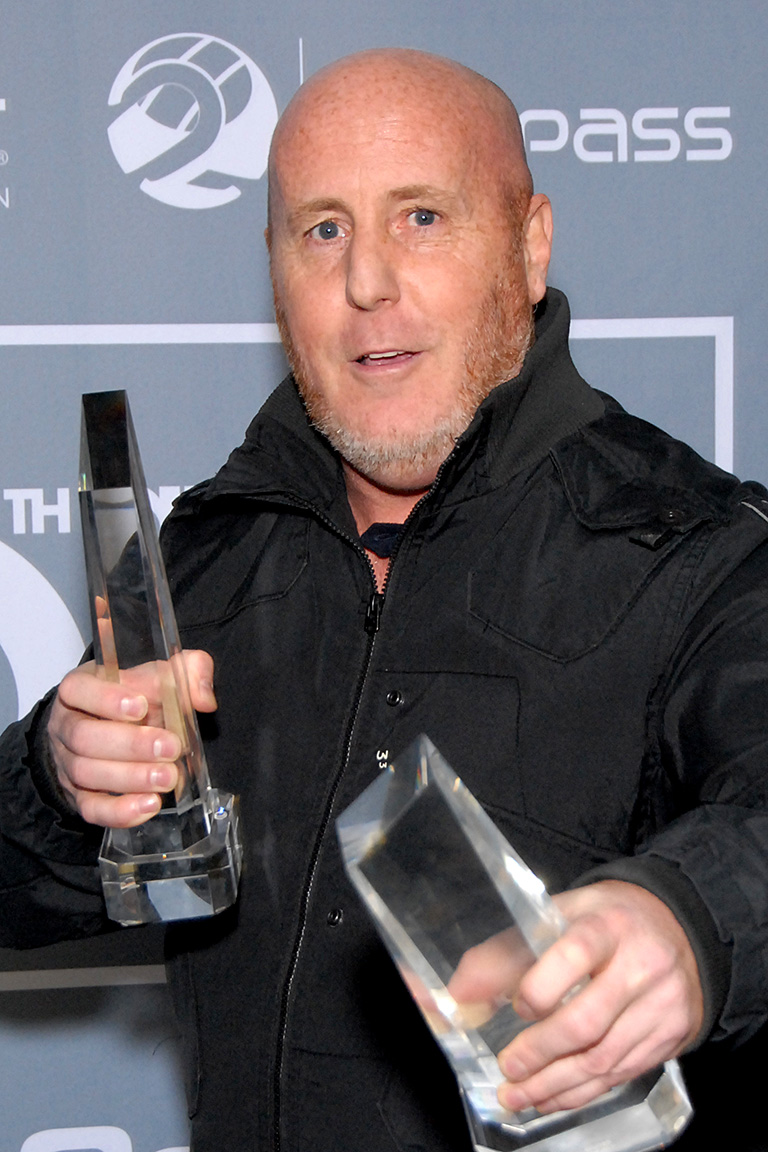
- Robby D., Santa Monica, California on January 10, 2012
- Born: August 19, 1967; Long Beach, California, U.S.
- Died: November 4, 2021 (aged 54); Los Angeles
- Other name: Robby Dee

Robby D. was an American pornographic film director and cinematographer.

== Early life ==
D. was born in Long Beach, California. He studied cinematography and directing at the UCLA School of Theater, Film and Television. Prior to porn, he worked as an action sports cameraman.

== Career ==
In 1998, D. began directing for Vivid Entertainment. While at Vivid, he directed three lines titled Action Sports Sex, Color Blind, and The Watcher. Since 2002, he has directed exclusively for Digital Playground. His directorial debut for Digital Playground, Sweet 101, was featured in the May 2003 issue of Revolver. He later created the series Jack's Playground along with several spin-offs such as Jack’s Teen America, Jack’s POV, and Jack’s Big Tit Show.

== Awards ==
- 2004 Venus Award – Best Director (USA)
- 2007 NightMoves Award – Best Director (Fan's Choice)
- 2008 Eroticline Award – Best US Director
- 2012 XBIZ Award – Director of the Year (Body of Work)
- 2014 AVN Hall of Fame
