= Miles Long =

American actor and director (born 1968)

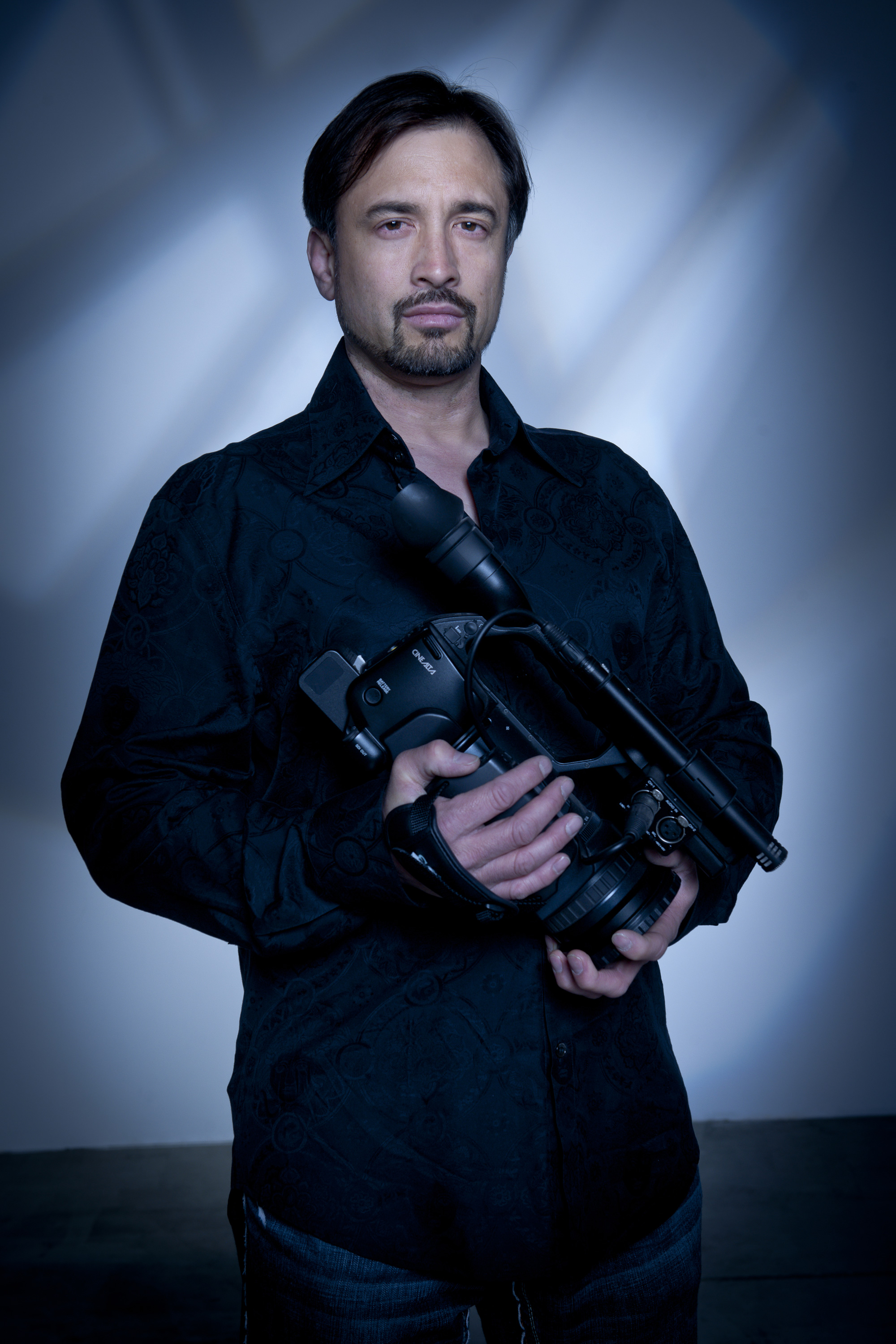
- Long's 2011 AVN Awards Hall of Fame photograph, Las Vegas, Nevada
- Born: November 4, 1968 (age 57); San Francisco, California, U.S.
- Height: 5 ft 10 in (1.78 m)
- Website: www.mileslong4real.com

Miles Long (born November 4, 1968) is an American director, producer, actor, writer, photographer and record label owner.

== Mainstream endeavors ==
His passion for dance music led him to open his Record Label, which focuses on EDM and House Music DJs and Artists, as well as Social Media Management and Branding. The Label, Sights & Sounds Productions, has Produced numerous events at nightclubs and venues throughout the US. In 2021 Long began combining his photography, videography, and producing to make shows for the Lingerie Fighting Championships, the all women's MMA and Wrestling PPV event which launched its own Channel on the Roku network. His show, Modz & Bodz received numerous interviews discussing his passion for building custom show cars and show bikes when not pursuing his love for photography and film production. Interviews on the show appeared in publications worldwide including the US, the UK, Singapore, & India. Starting in 2022, Long began extensively shooting for Mainstream Magazines, with his photography featured in dozens of Covers, Layouts and in Centerfolds of well known Magazines worldwide including FHM and Playboy. In September 2023, Long shot Shimmy La Roux for the Cover and Centerfold for Playboy Denmark's Playmate of the Year. In October 2023, Long Co Sponsored and Hosted a FHM Magazine Release Party in Vegas featuring his car collection which appears on his show Modz And Bodz along with the Models who appear in the 2024 FHM Top 100 issue. The event was covered by Getty Images and numerous other photographers and media outlets.

== Career ==
Long began working as a cameraman and director of photography for Michael Ninn. Long branched out into mainstream TV in 2007 as the Director of Photography of the television series Untold Stripclub Confessions. In 2011 he trademarked his stage name and successfully litigated against a company that used his stage name to market a product without his permission. In April 2020 he was interviewed by Newsweek magazine regarding the effect of the COVID-19 pandemic on his industry. In 2021 he began to write articles as a columnist for NightMoves Magazine interviewing stars he knew personally for interviews which allowed him to show a more personal side of the girls he was interviewing. He continues to make appearances on Radio, having been on LATalkRadio with Amber Lynn as well as Vivid Radio on SiriusXM with Christy Canyon and Lisa Ann. In June 2021 he appeared live on UK TV show This Morning and talked about his career, life, and love life. The TV interview and its related articles were also covered by the Daily Mirror and LADBible As of 20233 he has been inducted into the AVN, NightMoves, the AAIA, Urban X and XRCO Halls of Fame, won the NightMoves Triple Play award for excellence in more than 1 field and also received a Lifetime Achievement Award.

== Awards and nominations ==
List of accolades received by Miles Long
Awards and nominations
Award	Won	Nominated
AVN Awards	4	55
Fleshbot Awards	0	3
NightMoves Awards	5	6
The AAIAs	1	0
XBIZ Awards	0	16
XRCO Awards	1	10
Urban X Awards	3	9
The Sex Awards	0	1
IAFD Awards	1	1
- Total number of wins and nominations
Totals	14	101

Year	Ceremony	Result	Category	Work
2002	AVN Award	Nominated	Best Music (shared with Tommy Ganz)	Bad Wives 2
2002	AVN Award	Nominated	Best Music (shared with Tommy Ganz)	Marissa
2006	AVN Award	Nominated	Best New Video Production Company	Miles Long
2006	AVN Award	Nominated	Best All Girl Series	Muff 2
2007	AVN Award	Nominated	Best Director – Non-Feature	Addicted Again
2007	AVN Award	Nominated	Best All Sex Release	Addicted Again
2008	AVN Award	Nominated	Best All Sex Release	Ties That Bind 2
2008	AVN Award	Nominated	Best High-End All Sex Release	Addicted 3
2008	AVN Award	Nominated	Best High Definition Release	Addicted 3
2008	AVN Award	Nominated	Best Editing	Addicted 3
2009	AVN Award	Nominated	Best Continuing Series	Nylons 4
2009	AVN Award	Nominated	Best Gonzo Release	Big Loves 4
2009	AVN Award	Nominated	Best Gonzo Series	Big Loves
2009	AVN Award	Won	Best MILF Release	The Cougar Club
2010	AVN Award	Won	Best All-Sex Series	Addicted
2010	AVN Award	Nominated	Best Foot/Leg Fetish Release	Nylons 5
2010	AVN Award	Nominated	Best All Sex Series	Addicted 6
2010	AVN Award	Nominated	Best High-End All Sex Release	Addicted 6
2010	AVN Award	Nominated	Best Vignette Series	Addicted 6
2010	AVN Award	Nominated	Best MILF Release	The Cougar Club 2
2011	AVN Award	Won	Hall of Fame	—N/a
2011	AVN Award	Nominated	Best Foot/Leg Fetish Release	Nylons 7
2011	AVN Award	Nominated	Best Specialty Tape: Other Genre	Nylons 7
2011	AVN Award	Nominated	Best Older Woman/Younger Girl Movie	Kittens And Their MILF
2011	AVN Award	Nominated	Best Packaging Innovation	Vajazzled
2011	AVN Award	Nominated	Best All Girl Group Sex Scene	Girlfriends 2
2011	AVN Award	Nominated	Best Anal Sex Scene	Upskirts 2
2011	Urban X Award	Won	Best Couples Sex Scene	Vajazzled
2011	Urban X Award	Nominated	Best Gonzo Director	—N/a
2011	Urban X Award	Nominated	Director of the Year	—N/a
2011	XBIZ Award	Nominated	Director of the Year - Body of Work	—N/a
2011	XBIZ Award	Nominated	Gonzo Release of the Year	Nylons 7
2012	AVN Award	Won	Best Foot/Leg Fetish Release	Nylons 8
2012	AVN Award	Nominated	Best Director – Non Feature	Nylons 8
2012	AVN Award	Nominated	Best All Girl Release	Girlfriends 3
2012	AVN Award	Nominated	Best All Girl Group Sex Scene	Girlfriends 3
2012	AVN Award	Nominated	Best Foot/Leg Fetish Release	Young Thighs in Knee Highs
2012	AVN Award	Nominated	Best MILF Release	The Cougar Club 3
2012	Urban X Award	Won	Hall of Fame	—N/a
2012	XBIZ Award	Nominated	Director of the Year - Body of Work	—N/a
2012	XBIZ Award	Nominated	Director of the Year - Individual Project	The Cougar Club 3
2012	XBIZ Award	Nominated	Fetish Release of the Year	Nylons 8
2012	XBIZ Award	Nominated	Vignette Release of the Year	Nylons 8
2012	XBIZ Award	Nominated	All Sex Release of the Year	Nooners
2012	XBIZ Award	Nominated	Parody Release of the Year	Official Deal or No Deal Parody
2012	XBIZ Award	Nominated	Vignette Release of the Year	Sleazy Riders
2012	XRCO Award	Won	XRCO Hall of Fame	—N/a
2013
2013	AVN Award	Nominated	Best All Girl Series	Girlfriends
2013	AVN Award	Nominated	Best Foot/Leg Fetish Release	Nylons 9
2013	AVN Award	Nominated	Best Foot/Leg Fetish Release	Laid In Lingerie
2013	AVN Award	Nominated	Best Vignette Release	More Than You Bargained For
2013	AVN Award	Nominated	Best Young Girl Release	Cheerleaders Gone Bad
2013	The Sex Awards	Nominated	Favorite Director	—N/a
2013	XBIZ Award	Nominated	Fetish Release of the Year	Nylons 9
2013	XBIZ Award	Nominated	Vignette Release of the year	Office Politics
2013	XBIZ Award	Nominated	Director of the Year - Non-Feature Release	Office Politics
2014	AVN Award	Nominated	Best All Girl Series	Girlfriends
2014	XBIZ Award	Nominated	Director of the Year - Non-Feature Release	Angelic Asses
2014	XBIZ Award	Nominated	All Sex Release of the Year	Angelic Asses
2015	AVN Award	Nominated	Best Web Director	—N/a
2015	AVN Award	Nominated	Best Anal Series	Angelic Asses
2015	AVN Award	Nominated	Best Big Butt Release	Angelic Asses
2015	XBIZ Award	Nominated	All Sex Series of the Year	Angelic Asses
2016	AVN Award	Nominated	Best New Imprint	Little Dragon Pictures
2016	XRCO Award	Nominated	Best Director: Web	—N/a
2018	AVN Award	Nominated	Best Oral Movie	POV Mania #9
2018	XRCO Award	Nominated	Best Web Director	—N/a
2018	Urban X Award	Won	Studio of the Year	Bangbros
2018	Urban X Award	Nominated	Best Girl Girl Release	Pussy Crazy 4
2019	AVN Award	Nominated	Best Director - Web Channel/Site	—N/a
2019	AVN Award	Nominated	Best Oral Movie	POV Mania #12
2019	XBIZ Award	Nominated	Director or the Year - Web	—N/a
2019	XRCO Award	Nominated	Best Director - Non Feature	—N/a
2019	XRCO Award	Nominated	Best Director - Web	—N/a
2019	IAFD Award	Won	Director or the Year - Web	—N/a
2019	NightMoves Award	Won	Triple Play Award	—N/a
2019	NightMoves Award	Nominated	Best Non-Feature Director	—N/a
2019	Urban X Award	Nominated	Director of the Year	—N/a
2019	Urban X Award	Nominated	Studio of the Year	—N/a
2020	AVN Award	Nominated	Best Director - Web Channel/Site	—N/a
2020	AVN Award	Nominated	Best Oral Production	POV Mania #20
2020	AVN Award	Nominated	Best Gonzo Production	Full Service POV #7
2020	AVN Award	Nominated	Best POV Sex Scene	Shooting With Sexy Eliza Ibarra / Eliza Ibarra & Miles Long
2020	IAFD Award	Nominated	Director or the Year - Web	—N/a
2020	NightMoves Award	Nominated	Best Non-Feature Director	—N/a
2020	NightMoves Award	Nominated	Best Fetish/Taboo/Specialty Release	Are You Rough Enough #4
2020	XRCO Award	Nominated	Best Director - Web	—N/a
2021	AVN Award	Nominated	Best Director - Web Channel/Site	—N/a
2021	AVN Award	Nominated	Best POV Sex Scene	Luna's 5 Star Vacation Day 1 - Luna Star & Miles Long
2021	AVN Award	Nominated	Best Double-Penetration Sex Scene	Brooklyn Chase
2021	Nightmoves Award	Nominated	Best All Sex/ Gonzo Release	POV Mania #21
2021	Nightmoves Award	Won	Hall of Fame	—N/a
2021	XRCO Award	Nominated	Best Director - Web	—N/a
2021	Fleshbot Awards	Nominated	Director of the Year	—N/a
2022	AVN Award	Nominated	Best Director - Banner/Network	—N/a
2022	XRCO Award	Nominated	Best Director - Web	—N/a
2022	NightMoves Award	Won	Lifetime Achievement	—N/a
2022	Fleshbot Awards	Nominated	Director of the Year	—N/a
2023	AVN Award	Nominated	Best Director - Non-Narrative	—N/a
2023	AVN Award	Nominated	Best Mainstream Venture	—N/a
2023	AVN Award	Nominated	Best Solo/Tease Performance	When Girls Are Alone
2023	AAI Award	Won	Hall of Fame	—N/a
2023	Urban X Award	Nominated	Director of the Year	—N/a
2023	XRCO Award	Nominated	Best Director - Web	—N/a
2023	Fleshbot Awards	Nominated	Best Oral Scene	POV Mania #22 / Miles Long & Kay Carter
2023	NightMoves Award	Won	Best All Girl Release	Kenzie Loves Girls
2024	AVN Award	Nominated	Best All Girl Release	Kenzie Loves Girls
2024	AVN Award	Nominated	Best Mainstream Venture	Modz And Bodz
2024	XRCO Award	Nominated	Best Director - Web	—N/a
2024	Urban X Award	Nominated	Director of the Year	—N/a
2024	Nightmoves	Nominated	Best Non-Feature Director	—N/a
2024	Nightmoves	Nominated	Best All Sex / Gonzo Release	When Girls Are Alone #3
2025	XRCO Award	Nominated	Best Director - Web	—N/a
2025	Urban X Award	Nominated	Fan Favorite Director	—N/a
