= Lauren Phillips (American actress) =

American pornographic film actress

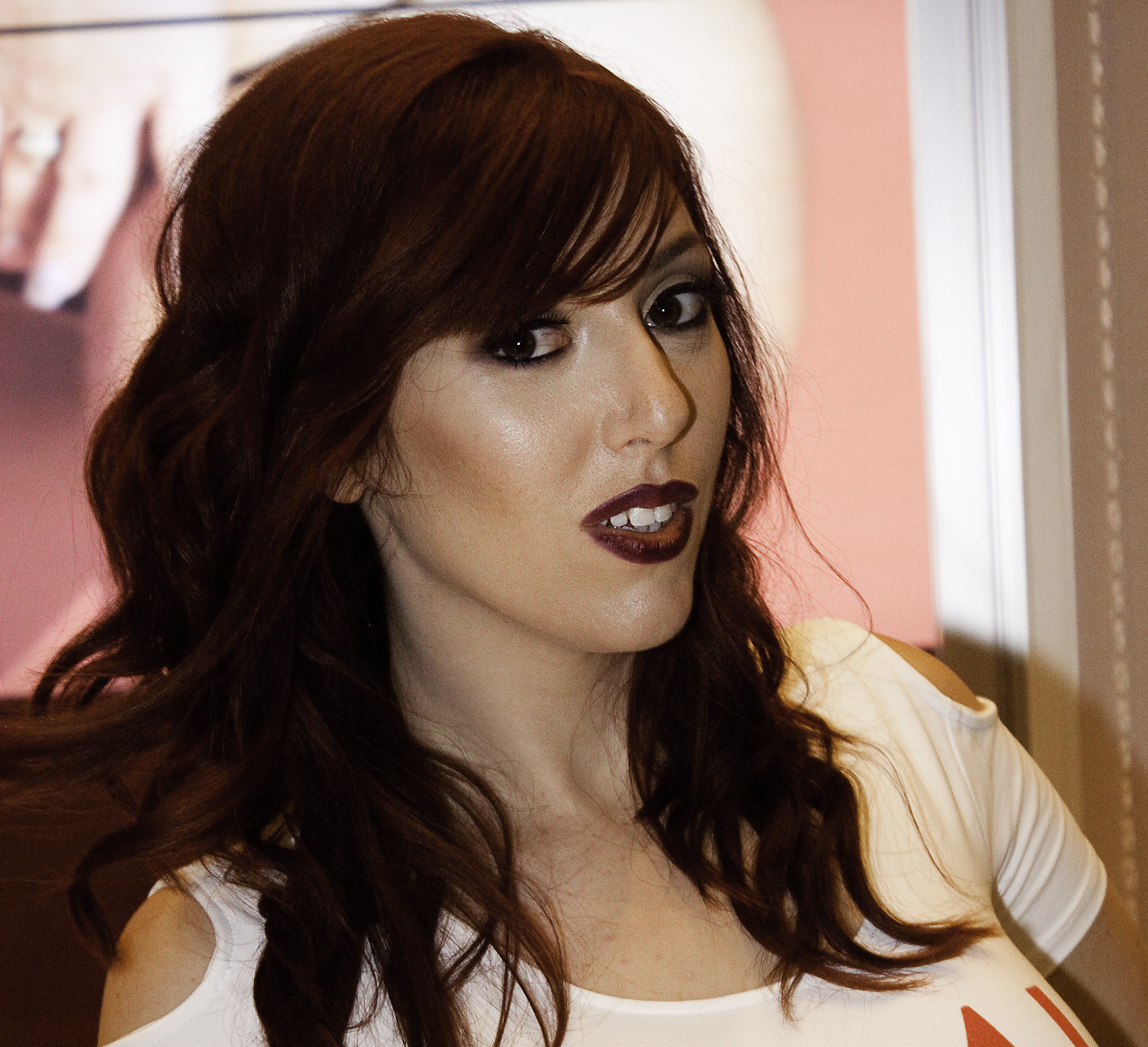
- Phillips in 2016
- Education: Rutgers University
- Occupations: Pornographic film actress; exotic dancer
- Years active: 2013–present
- Website: www.laurenphillips.com

Lauren Phillips is an American pornographic film actress and feature dancer.

== Career ==
Phillips has co-hosted a talk radio program with James Bartholet titled Inside the Industry. Phillips' website laurenphillips.com was nominated for Best Model Website at the 2018 AVN Awards. In April 2020, Phillips appeared on the Porn Stars Are People podcast hosted by Dan Frigolette.

== Personal life ==
Phillips grew up in Atlantic County, New Jersey and is a graduate of Rutgers University. In a 2018 interview with The Daily Beast, she spoke about experiencing cyberbullying on social media.

== Filmography ==
=== Television ===
Year	Show	Role	Notes
2018	Bare Fitness	Herself	
2019	Best in Sex – 2019 AVN Awards	Herself	
2020	Best in Sex – 2020 AVN Awards	Herself	

== Awards and nominations ==
Year	Ceremony	Award	Work	Result
2016	NightMoves Awards	Miss Congeniality	—N/a	Won
2017	34th AVN Awards	Best Group Sex Scene	Ginger Orgy	Nominated
2017	34th AVN Awards	Best Virtual Reality Sex Scene	Sarah Jessie's X3 Extreme VR Experience	Nominated
2017	XBIZ Awards	Best Scene – Parody Release	Storage Whores Orgy	Nominated
2017	NightMoves Awards	Adult Performer Website of the Year (Editor's Choice)	laurenphillips.com	Won
2018	Inked Awards	Social Media Queen	—N/a	Won
2018	NightMoves Awards	Best Adult Star Feature Dancer	—N/a	Nominated
2018	NightMoves Awards	Most Underrated Female Performer (Editor's Choice)	—N/a	Won
2018	XBIZ Awards	Best Sex Scene – Taboo Release	I Love My Mom's Big Round Tits 5	Nominated
2019	36th AVN Awards	Most Outrageous Sex Scene	Jurassic Wood: Swollen Dingdong	Nominated
2019	Inked Awards	Best Anal	—N/a	Nominated
2019	Inked Awards	Best Ass	—N/a	Nominated
2019	Inked Awards	Best Female Clip Artist	—N/a	Nominated
2019	Inked Awards	Best Group Scene	Neighborhood Swingers 22	Nominated
2019	Inked Awards	Best Model Website	laurenphillips.com	Nominated
2019	Inked Awards	Best Oral	—N/a	Nominated
2019	Inked Awards	Social Media Queen	—N/a	Nominated
2019	NightMoves Awards	Best Body	—N/a	Nominated
2019	NightMoves Awards	Social Media Star of the Year (Editor's Choice)	—N/a	Won
2019	XRCO Awards	Social Media Queen	—N/a	Nominated
2020	37th AVN Awards	Best Solo/Tease Performance	I Love Big Toys 42	Nominated
2020	37th AVN Awards	Best Virtual Reality Sex Scene	Stolen: Director's Cut	Nominated
2020	37th AVN Awards	Fan Award: Most Spectacular Boobs	—N/a	Nominated
2020	37th AVN Awards	Most Outrageous Sex Scene	Area 51 Sex Tape	Nominated
2020	GayVN Awards	Best Bi Sex Scene	Bi Peg To Differ	Nominated
2020	Pornhub Awards	Top MILF Performer	—N/a	Nominated
2020	Pornhub Awards	Top Lesbian Performer	—N/a	Nominated
2020	Transgender Erotica Awards	Best Non-transgender Female Performer	—N/a	Nominated
2020	NightMoves Awards	Hall of Fame	—N/a	Won
2021	Inked Awards	Feature of the Year	—N/a	Nominated
2021	Inked Awards	Group Scene of the Year	—N/a	Nominated
2022	NightMoves Awards	Best All-Girl Performer	—N/a	Won
2023	NightMoves Awards	Triple Play Award (Dancing/Performing/Directing)	—N/a	Won
2023	AltStar Awards	Fan Favorite Female Performer of the Year	—N/a	Won
2024	XBIZ Awards	MILF Performer of the Year	—N/a	Won
2024	NightMoves Awards	Best Girl/Girl Performer	—N/a	Won
2025	NightMoves Awards	Industry Ambassador Award	—N/a	Won
2026	NightMoves Awards	Best MILF Performer	—N/a	Won
Total				Wins: 13
Total				Nominations: 25
