= Rachel Starr =

American pornographic film actress

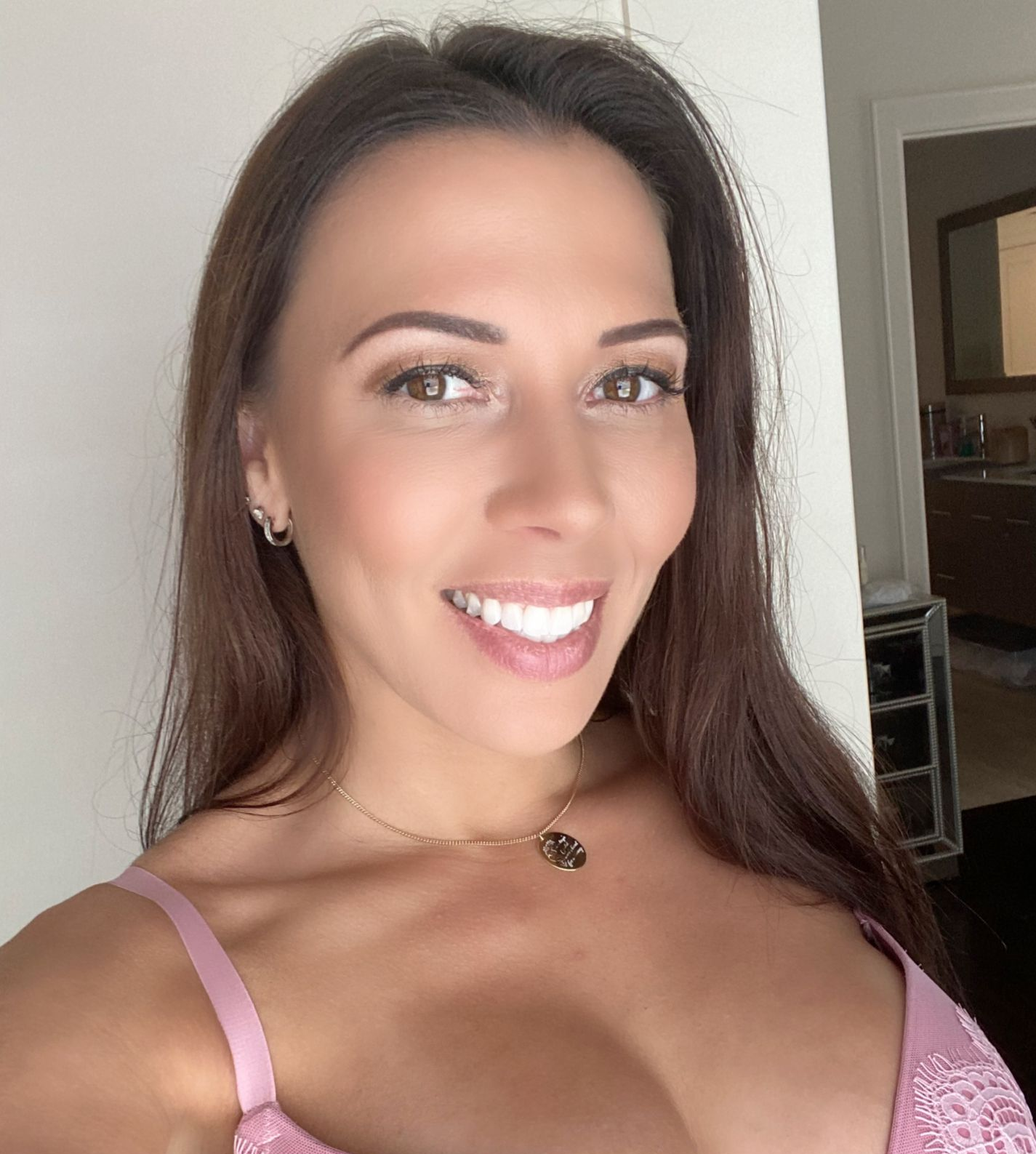
- Starr in 2020
- Occupation: Pornographic film actress
- Website: rachelstarr.com

Signature
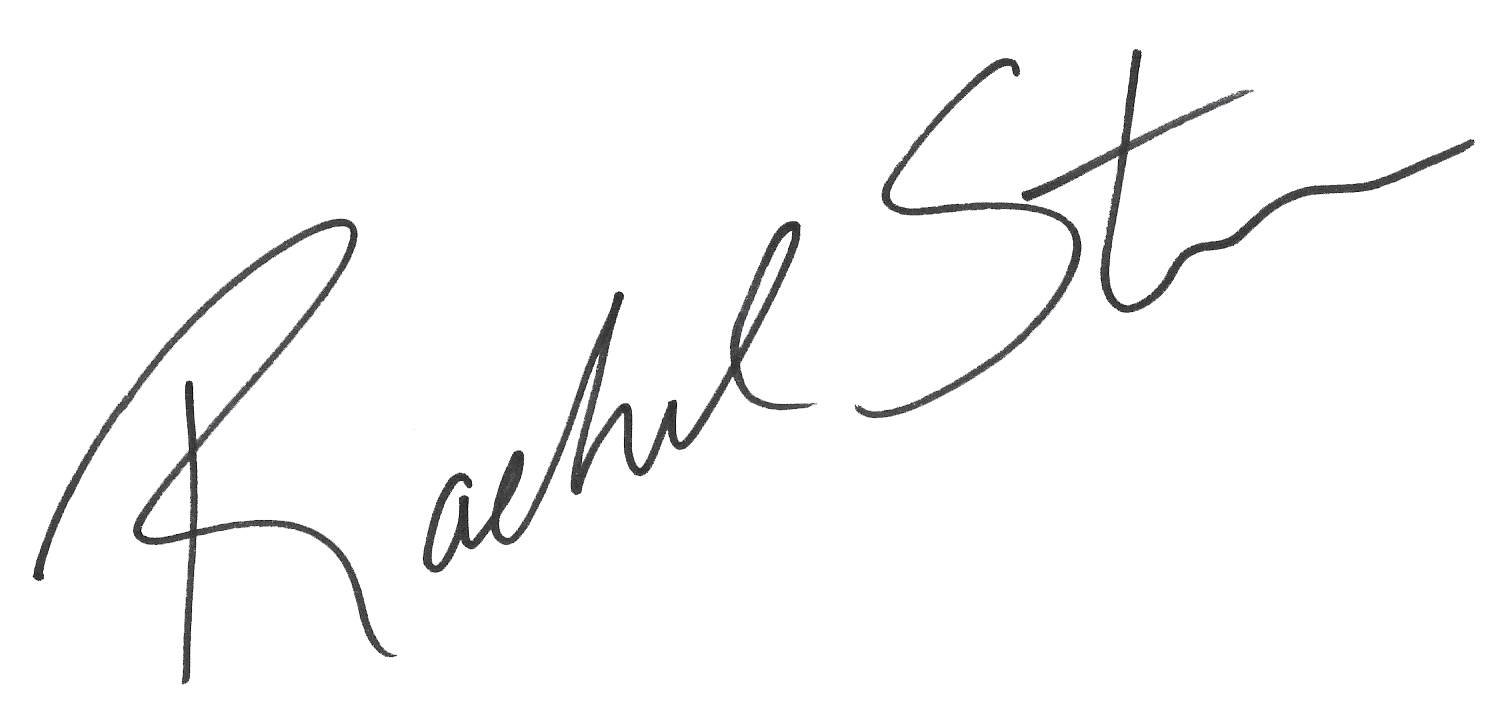

Rachel Starr is an American pornographic film actress. She was inducted into the AVN Hall of Fame in 2022.

== Career ==
In November 2021, FanCentro signed Starr to be a brand ambassador to promote their platform.

In February of 2023, Starr signed a deal with Interactive Sex Toy company Kiiroo to release a personalized stroker sleeve in her likeness called "FeelRachel".

In May of 2023, Starr released her first novel, Heart of Stone, a romance novel. This is the first book in an ongoing saga set in the fictional town of Lace, Elm, Texas.

== Personal life ==
In 2013, Starr was linked romantically with professional baseball first baseman and catcher Mike Napoli. That same year, she was caught in a compromising position with MGK, reportedly having given him oral sex while he was on stage.

Starr became friends with Tiger King star Joe Exotic in 2013. A mutual colleague of theirs asked Starr to do a photoshoot with Exotic in Wynnewood, Oklahoma. Starr and Joe Exotic worked together again in 2021 when Exotic released his first collection of NFTs in 2021 while in prison.

== Awards and nominations ==
List of accolades
Awards and nominations
Award	Won	Nominated
AVN Awards	1	6
XBIZ Awards	0	1
Fleshbot Awards	2	3
Nightmoves Awards	2	2
Sex Awards	0	0
The Fannys	0	1
Brazzers	1	0
- Total number of wins and nominations
Totals	6	14

Year	Ceremony	Result	Award
2009	AVN Awards	Nominated	Best Couples – 'Rachel's Choice'
2011	AVN Awards	Nominated	Best Three-Way Sex Scene – 'Rachel Starr is Badass'
2013	Sex Awards	Nominated	Porn's Best Body – N/A
2014	AVN Awards	Nominated	Best POV Sex Scene – 'Tanlines 3'
2014	The Fannys	Nominated	Most Heroic Ass (Best Anal) – N/A
2014	XBIZ Awards	Nominated	Best Scene, Non-Feature Release – 'Ass Worship 14'
2015	AVN Award	Nominated	Best Three-Way Sex Scene, G/B/B – 'Stacked Hardbodies'
2015	AVN Award	Nominated	Fan Award – 'Social Media Star'
2015	AVN Award	Nominated	Fan Award – 'Hottest Ass'
2021	Fleshbot Awards	Won	Best MILF – N/A
2021	Fleshbot Awards	Won	Best Social Media Personality – N/A
2021	Fleshbot Awards	Nominated	Female Performer of the Year – N/A
2022	AVN Award	Won	Hall of Fame
2022	NightMoves Award	Won	Best MILF Performer
2022	NightMoves Award	Won	Hall of Fame
2023	Brazzers	Won	Hall of Fame

== See also ==
- List of pornographic film actors who have appeared in mainstream films
- List of members of the AVN Hall of Fame
