= Alexis Amore =

American pornographic film actress (born 1978/1979)

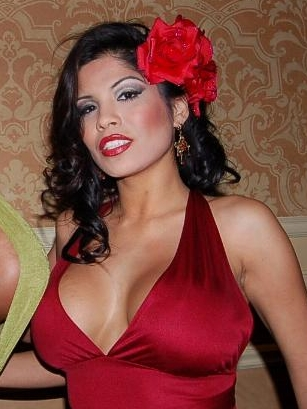
- Amore in 2006
- Born: 1978 or 1979 (age 47–48); Lima, Peru
- Occupations: Pornographic film actress; director

Alexis Amore (born 1978 or 1979) is a pornographic film actress and director. In 2018, she was inducted into the AVN Hall of Fame.

== Early life ==
Amore was born in Lima, Peru and raised in Redondo Beach, California. She modeled for Nordstrom as a teenager and also worked as a nurse at a Catholic hospital.

== Career ==
Before entering the pornography industry, Amore was a dancer on MTV's The Grind; she was later discovered on an episode of Night Calls. She performed her first pornographic scene in The Watcher 6 (1999) from Vivid Entertainment. In 2001, she took a one-year hiatus from performing, during which she continued feature dancing, and returned in the summer of 2002.

In March 2003, Amore became a contract performer for Jill Kelly Productions. Shortly after her contract with JKP ended, she signed a performing and directing contract with Anabolic Video in June 2004. Once her deal with Anabolic Video ended, she became an exclusive contract performer and spokesperson for Video Team in September 2005. She made her debut for the company in the film All About Alexis. In September 2006, she decided not to renew her contract with Video Team.

In June 2004, Frecuencia Latina filmed a documentary on her for the show Reporte Semanal. In March 2006, Amore appeared on the Spanish language television shows No te Duermas and El Poder in Puerto Rico. Amore was featured on the cover of the September 2006 issue of Lowrider. In January 2008, Amore announced that she would resume performing in boy/girl sex scenes after two years of only working with other women.

== Other ventures ==
On October 22, 2014, she launched a show titled That's Amore on Vivid Radio. On December 7, 2004, Amore debuted as a columnist on AVN Insider with a column titled "Simply Alexis". She had previously written a sex advice column for the mainstream Peruvian magazine Oye.

== Awards ==
| Year | Ceremony | Category |
|---|---|---|
| 2004 | NightMoves Award | Best Actress (Fan's Choice) |
| 2006 | AFWG Award | Porn Comeback of the Year |
| 2006 | NightMoves Award | Best Feature Entertainer (Fan's Choice) |
| 2018 | AVN Award | Hall of Fame |
| 2018 | Urban X Award | Hall of Fame |
