= Will Ryder =

American pornographic film director, producer, screenwriter and publicist

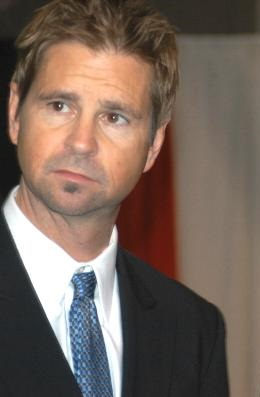
- Will Ryder at the AVN Adult Entertainment Expo in Las Vegas on January 11, 2007
- Born: Jeff Mullen; July 31, 1960 (age 65); Milwaukee, Wisconsin, U.S.
- Other name: Will Rider
- Website: sitcums.com

Will Ryder (born Jeff Mullen; July 31, 1960) is an American director, producer, screenwriter, publicist, camera operator, and composer of and for pornographic films. He has won a considerable number of awards for his work.

== Early life ==
Ryder was born in Milwaukee, Wisconsin and he is of English and Finnish descent. He worked as a keyboardist in the music industry for fifteen years.

== Career ==
In 1983, Ryder befriended pornographic actress Amber Lynn while he was seeking employment in the adult film industry as a composer for pornographic films. Lynn introduced him to other people in the business and director Roy Karch was the first to hire him. He left the industry before returning in 2001 as a publicist for New Sensations/Digital Sin. In 2001, he launched the PR firm All Media Play. In 2004, he launched his own production label, X-Play, and made his directorial debut with the film Britney Rears Wild Back Stage Sex Party.

== Awards and nominations ==
Will Ryder awards and nominations
Awards and nominations
Award	Wins	Nominations
AVN Awards	4	35
NightMoves Awards	5	0
XBIZ Awards	4	21
XRCO Awards	3	6

Totals (Note: Certain award groups do not simply award one winner. They acknowledge several different recipients, have runners-up, and have third place. Since this is a specific recognition and is different from losing an award, runner-up mentions are considered wins in this award tally. For simplification and to avoid errors, each award in this list has been presumed to have had a prior nomination.)
- Wins: 16
- Nominations: 62

AVN Awards
Year	Result	Award	Work
2006	Nominated	Best Music (shared with GJ Music)	Britney Rears Wild Backstage Sex Party
2007	Nominated	Best Art Direction – Video	Britney Rears 3
2007	Nominated	Best Music	Britney Rears 3
2008	Nominated	Best Director, Video	Not the Bradys XXX
2008	Nominated	Best Screenplay, Video	Not the Bradys XXX
2009	Nominated	Best Director – Feature	Not Bewitched XXX
2009	Nominated	Best Screenplay	Not Bewitched XXX
2009	Nominated	Director of the Year	—N/a
2010	Nominated	Best Director, Feature	Flight Attendants
2010	Nominated	Best Original Song	"Fly Global" in Flight Attendants
2010	Nominated	Best Original Song	"Sisters and Brothers" in Not The Bradys XXX: Marcia, Marcia, Marcia!
2010	Nominated	Best Screenplay	Flight Attendants
2010	Nominated	Best Screenplay	Not Married with Children XXX
2010	Won	Director of the Year (Body of Work)	—N/a
2011	Nominated	Best Director – Feature	Not Charlie's Angels XXX
2011	Nominated	Best Screenplay – Adapted	Not Charlie's Angels XXX
2011	Nominated	Best Screenplay – Adapted	Not M*A*S*H XXX
2011	Nominated	Director of the Year (Body of Work)	—N/a
2012	Nominated	Best Director – Parody	The Flintstones: A XXX Parody
2012	Nominated	Best Non-Sex Performance	Superman XXX: A Porn Parody
2012	Nominated	Best Screenplay – Parody	Beverly Hillbillies: A XXX Parody
2012	Nominated	Director of the Year (Body of Work)	—N/a
2013	Nominated	Best Director – Parody	Not the Three Stooges XXX
2013	Nominated	Best Screenplay – Parody	Not Animal House XXX
2014	Nominated	Best Director – Parody	Grease XXX: A Parody
2014	Won	Best Director – Parody	Not the Wizard of Oz XXX
2014	Nominated	Best Editing (shared with Cyrus Weatherbee)	Not the Wizard of Oz XXX
2014	Won	Best Original Song (shared with Rock Hardson)	"Queen of Munchkin Land" in Not The Wizard of Oz XXX
2014	Nominated	Best Original Song	"I Wonder What Is Happening" in Not The Wizard of Oz XXX
2014	Nominated	Best Screenplay – Parody	Grease XXX: A Parody
2014	Nominated	Best Screenplay – Parody	Not South Park XXX
2014	Nominated	Best Screenplay – Parody	Not the Wizard of Oz XXX
2014	Nominated	Director of the Year	—N/a
2015	Won	AVN Hall of Fame	—N/a
2015	Nominated	Best Director – Parody	American Hustle XXX Porn Parody
2015	Nominated	Best Director – Parody	Not Jersey Boys XXX: A Porn Musical
2015	Nominated	Best Non-Sex Performance	Not Jersey Boys XXX: A Porn Musical
2015	Nominated	Best Screenplay – Parody	American Hustle XXX Porn Parody
2015	Nominated	Best Screenplay – Parody	Not Jersey Boys XXX: A Porn Musical

NightMoves Awards
Year	Result	Award
2009	Won	National Lifetime Achievement Award
2012	Won	Best Director – Parody (Editor's Choice)
2013	Won	Best Director – Parody (Editor's Choice)
2014	Won	Best Director – Parody (Editor's Choice)
2015	Won	Best Director – Parody (Editor's Choice)

XBIZ Awards
Year	Result	Award	Work
2008	Nominated	Feature Director of the Year	—N/a
2009	Nominated	Director of the Year – Body of Work	—N/a
2009	Won	Director of the Year – Individual Project	Not Bewitched XXX
2010	Nominated	Director of the Year – Body of Work	—N/a
2010	Nominated	Director of the Year – Individual Project	Flight Attendants
2010	Won	Porn Director of the Year (People's Choice)	—N/a
2011	Nominated	Director of the Year – Body of Work	—N/a
2011	Nominated	Director of the Year – Individual Project	Not Charlie's Angels XXX
2011	Nominated	Screenplay of the Year	Not Charlie's Angels XXX
2012	Nominated	Director of the Year – Body of Work	—N/a
2012	Nominated	Director of the Year – Individual Project	Rocky XXX: A Parody Thriller
2012	Nominated	Screenplay of the Year	Beverly Hillbillies XXX
2013	Nominated	Director of the Year – Body of Work	—N/a
2013	Nominated	Director of the Year – Parody	Not Animal House XXX
2013	Nominated	Director of the Year – Parody	Not the Three Stooges XXX
2014	Nominated	Director of the Year – Body of Work	—N/a
2014	Won	Director of the Year – Parody	Grease XXX: A Parody
2014	Nominated	Director of the Year – Parody	Love Boat XXX: A Parody
2014	Nominated	Director of the Year – Parody	Not the Wizard of Oz XXX
2014	Nominated	Best Editing (shared with Cyrus Weatherbee)	Grease XXX: A Parody
2014	Nominated	Best Editing (shared with Cyrus Weatherbee)	Not the Wizard of Oz XXX
2015	Nominated	Director of the Year – Body of Work	—N/a
2015	Nominated	Director of the Year – Parody	American Hustle XXX
2015	Won	Director of the Year – Parody	Not the Jersey Boys XXX
2015	Nominated	Best Non-Sex Acting Performance	Not the Jersey Boys XXX

XRCO Awards
Year	Result	Award
2008	Nominated	Best Director (Features)
2009	Nominated	Best Director (Features)
2010	Won	Best Director (Features)
2011	Nominated	Best Director (Parody)
2012	Nominated	Best Director (Parody)
2013	Nominated	Best Director (Parody)
2014	Won	Best Director (Parody)
2015	Nominated	Best Director (Parody)
2015	Won	XRCO Hall of Fame
