= Superman (Eminem song) =

Single by Eminem featuring Dina Rae

from the album The Eminem Show
- Released: January 21, 2003
- Recorded: 2001–2002
- Genre: Hip hop; dirty rap
- Length: 5:50 (album version); 5:02 (music video); 4:47 (clean version); 7:02 (instrumental version)
- Label: Aftermath; Shady; Interscope
- Songwriters: Marshall Mathers; Jeff Bass; Steve King
- Producers: Eminem; Jeff Bass

Eminem singles chronology
"8 Mile" (2002)	"Superman" (2003)	"Sing for the Moment" (2003)

Music videos
- "Superman" (Uncensored) on YouTube; "Superman" (Censored) on YouTube

"Superman" is a song by American rapper Eminem from his fourth studio album, The Eminem Show (2002), featuring guest vocals from his frequent collaborator, singer Dina Rae. Written by Eminem, Detroit record producers Jeff Bass and Steve King, the song was released as the third single on January 21, 2003, in the United States only. It peaked at number 15 on the Billboard Hot 100 chart on the issue dated March 15, 2003, and received 2× Platinum certification by the Recording Industry Association of America (RIAA).

The lyrics talk of the Eminem's experience with groupies and the song has been criticized by some for its perceived misogyny. Musically known for its "southern bounce", it's notable for its censored and uncensored versions of its music video starring porn actress Gina Lynn.

== Background ==
"Superman" is about the rocky relationships and promiscuous nature of the women Eminem has had in his life and how he plans to deal with it. In his 2008 autobiography, The Way I Am, Eminem revealed that the song is, to an extent, about his alleged relationship with Mariah Carey. In it he raps "What you trying be? My new wife? / What, you Mariah? Fly through twice." "Superman" is very similar to Eminem's song "Drug Ballad" and D12's song "Pimp Like Me".

In a 2021 interview, Dina Rae revealed that Carey originally recorded the hook for "Superman." Unknown conflicts between Eminem and Carey caused Rae to replace Carey. Rae revealed that she heard and used Carey's reference when she recorded her parts.

== Critical reception ==
Entertainment Weekly editor described "In the creepy-crawly, mesmerizing 'Superman', he depicts himself as both sexual predator and commitment-phobic single guy." HipHopDX named the production "the southern bounce", lyrics as dealing with groupies and called the chorus "cheesy". Steve Juon described the song's rap style: "'Superman' features Eminem playing with his flow in a stuttered cadence, but he's done the gimmick before and his beat on this one inspires only partial attention to his flow." Rolling Stone concluded that his divorce fuels the slow Southern bounce of the hypermisogynist "Superman."

== Music video ==
The accompanying music video for "Superman" features pornographic actress Gina Lynn. Shannon Elizabeth was Eminem's first choice, although this never came to fruition as they could not come to terms. The video can only be found on the 8 Mile DVD and contains an edit different from the album version. The uncensored video contains nudity and was rarely shown on MTV or BET, although it is available on YouTube, Vevo, and Dailymotion.

== Track listing and formats ==
Promotional CD single

No.	Title	Writer(s)	Producer(s)	Length
1.	"Superman" (clean radio edit)	Marshall Mathers; Jeff Bass; Steve King	Eminem; Jeff Bass^{[a]}	4:42

12-inch vinyl single

Side A
No.	Title	Writer(s)	Producer(s)	Length
1.	"Superman" (clean radio edit)	Mathers; Bass; King	Eminem; Bass^{[a]}	4:42
2.	"Superman" (album version)	Mathers; Bass; King	Eminem; Bass^{[a]}	5:50
Total length:				10:32

Side B
No.	Title	Writer(s)	Producer(s)	Length
1.	"Superman" (instrumental)	Mathers; Bass; King	Eminem; Bass^{[a]}	4:27
2.	"Superman" (acapella)	Mathers; Bass; King	Eminem; Bass^{[a]}	4:27
Total length:				8:54

Notes

- ^{^[a]} signifies an additional producer.

== Charts ==
=== Weekly charts ===
Chart (2003)	Peak position
Canada CHR (Nielsen BDS)	19
New Zealand (Recorded Music NZ)	42
US Billboard Hot 100	15
US Hot Rap Songs (Billboard)	10
US Hot R&B/Hip-Hop Songs (Billboard)	44
US Pop Airplay (Billboard)	10

Chart (2022–2023)	Peak position
Czech Republic Singles Digital (ČNS IFPI)	48
Global 200 (Billboard)	193
Norway (VG-lista)	35
Portugal (AFP)	115
Slovakia (Singles Digitál Top 100)	54

=== Year-end charts ===
Chart (2003)	Position
US Billboard Hot 100	98

== Certifications ==
Region	Certification	Certified units/sales
Australia (ARIA)	5× Platinum	350,000^{‡}
Brazil (Pro-Música Brasil)	Gold	30,000^{‡}
Denmark (IFPI Danmark)	Platinum	90,000^{‡}
Germany (BVMI)	Gold	300,000^{‡}
Italy (FIMI)	Gold	50,000^{‡}
New Zealand (RMNZ)	5× Platinum	150,000^{‡}
Portugal (AFP)	Platinum	40,000^{‡}
Spain (Promusicae)	Gold	30,000^{‡}
United Kingdom (BPI)	2× Platinum	1,200,000^{‡}
United States (RIAA)	2× Platinum	2,000,000^{‡}
^{‡} Sales+streaming figures based on certification alone.

== Release history ==
Region	Date	Format(s)	Label(s)	Ref.
United States	January 21, 2003	Contemporary hit radio	Shady, Aftermath, Interscope	
