= Gina Lynn =

American pornographic actress (born 1974)

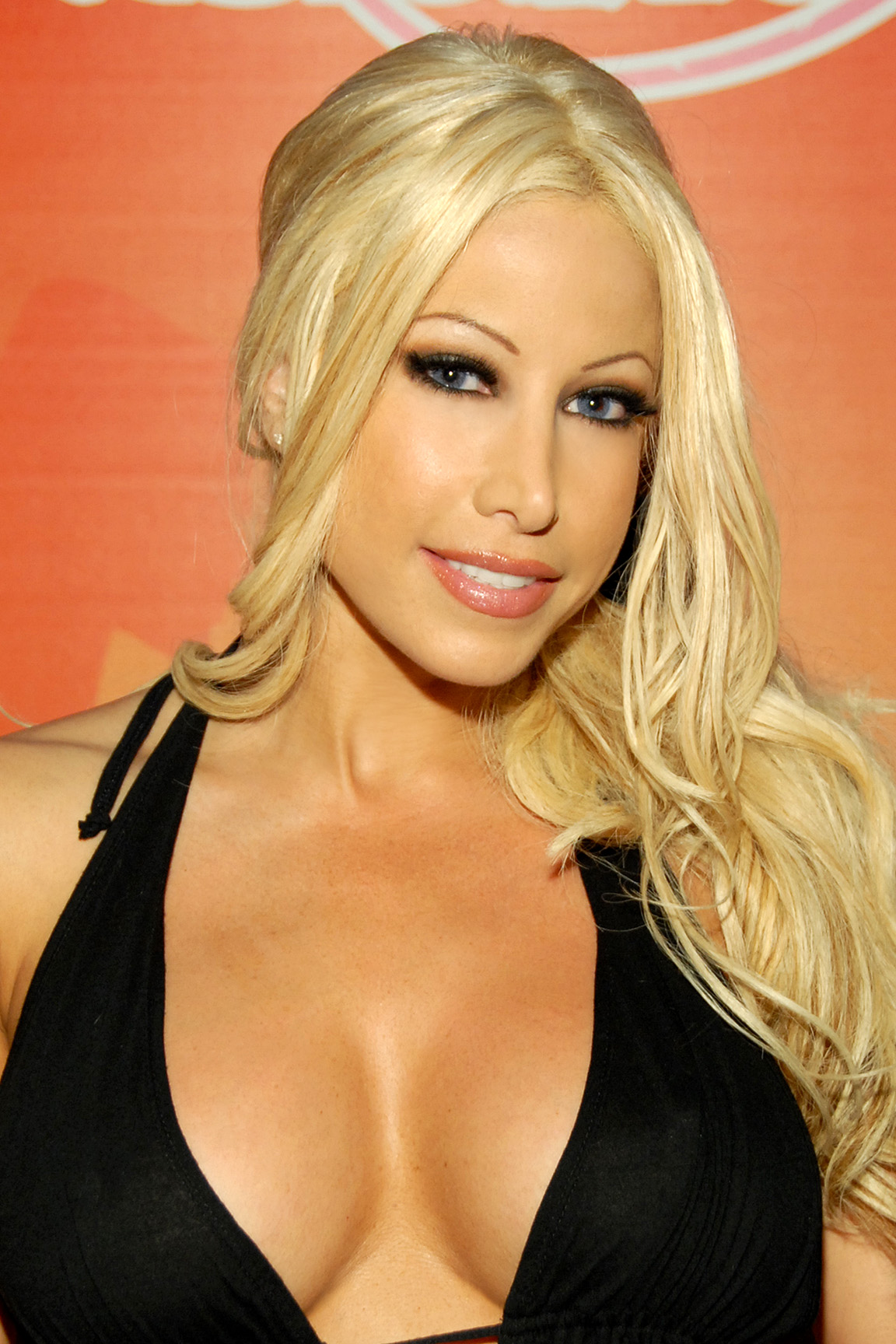
- Lynn at the Exxxotica Expo in Los Angeles, 2010
- Born: Tanya Mercado; February 15, 1974 (age 52); Mayagüez, Puerto Rico, U.S.
- Occupations: Pornographic actress; model; stripper
- Spouse: Travis Knight (m. 1999; div. 2012)

Tanya Mercado (born February 15, 1974), known professionally as Gina Lynn, is an American former pornographic actress, model, and stripper. She was inducted into the AVN Hall of Fame in 2010 and is the Penthouse magazine Penthouse Pet for April 2012. Lynn is also known for appearing with Eminem in the music video for "Superman".

== Early life ==
Gina Lynn was born Tanya Mercado on February 15, 1974, in Puerto Rico, and moved to New Jersey at age five. Of Puerto Rican and Italian descent, she was raised in Jackson Township, New Jersey.

== Career ==
In June 2000, Lynn signed a one-year exclusive performing contract with Pleasure Productions. In 2002, she made a cameo in Analyze That as a stripper. From the fourth season of The Sopranos, Lynn made periodic appearances as a stripper in the "Bada Bing!" strip club, scenes for which were filmed in Satin Dolls. As of 2009, she continued to make movies for the company, as well as for her own studio, Gina Lynn Productions. She also directs and has over 20 films to her credit.

In 2003, Lynn appeared as the love interest of American rapper Eminem in the music video for "Superman". Though too racy for Total Request Live, Complex magazine described it as one of Eminem's most memorable music videos due to Lynn's appearance.

In 2006, Lynn was the subject of an interview by the Detroit newspaper Metro Times. The article compared Lynn to fellow porn actors such as Jewel De'Nyle, Belladonna, Taylor St. Claire and John Stagliano.

In 2009, she starred in the movie Minghags where she played the half sister of main character Lenny, played by Jackass star and professional skateboarder Bam Margera.

In March 2012, Lynn was announced by Penthouse to be their Penthouse Pet for April 2012. The end of that very month, Lynn announced that she had retired from the porn industry, but continues to appear on webcams.

== Awards ==
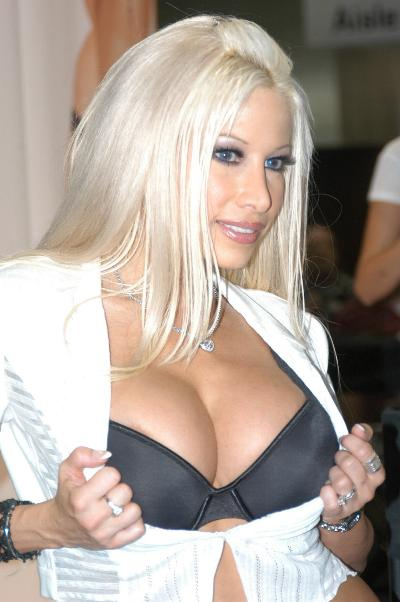
Gina Lynn at Erotica LA 2006

- 2002 NightMoves Award – Best Feature Dancer
- 2003 Exotic Dancer Award – Adult Movie Feature Entertainer of the Year
- 2005 AVN Award – Best Gonzo Release for Gina Lynn's Darkside
- 2005 NightMoves Award – Best New Production Company (Fan's Choice)
- 2006 FICEB Ninfa Award – Best Actress (Public)
- 2007 NightMoves Award – Best Feature Dancer (Editor's Choice)
- 2007 NightMoves Hall of Fame inductee
- 2008 F.A.M.E. Award – Favorite Ass
- 2009 NightMoves Triple Play Award (Dancing/Performing/Directing)
- 2010 AVN Hall of Fame inductee
