= Devil's Film =

Pornographic film studio based in Los Angeles

- Company type: Private
- Industry: Pornography
- Founded: April 23, 1997; 29 years ago
- Headquarters: Chatsworth, California, United States
- Products: Pornographic films
- Owner: Gamma Entertainment
- Website: devilsfilm.com

Devil's Film is an American independent pornographic film studio, based in Chatsworth, Los Angeles, California. Launched in 1997, the studio continues to specialize in swinger and gang bang oriented gonzo pornography and niche product centered on such popular fetishes as interracial pornography, transsexual pornography, and MILF pornography.

== History ==
Devil's Film entered the adult parody market in 2009 with the release of Coctomom, a spoof inspired by tabloid sensation Nadya Suleman ("Octomom") after giving birth to octuplets through in vitro fertilisation. Parodies of HBO's Big Love, AMC's Mad Men, ABC's The Bachelor and NBC's The Biggest Loser soon followed, along with send-ups of Fast Times at Ridgemont High and the entire Twilight Saga.

== Management ==
In April 2013, Giant Media Group, the parent company of Pipedream Products, announced the acquisition of Devil's Film.

== Operations ==
Devil's Film is also home to lesbian shingle The L Factor and transsexual studio GoodFellas Productions, producer of America's Next Top Tranny, a parody of The CW's long-running reality series America's Next Top Model.

== Awards ==
- 2007 AVN Award - 'Best Transsexual Series' for Transsexual Prostitutes
- 2008 AVN Award - 'Best Transsexual Release' for Transsexual Babysitters 2
- 2008 AVN Award - 'Best Transsexual Series' for Transsexual Prostitutes
- 2009 AVN Award - 'Best Orgy/Gang Bang Series' for Cream Pie Orgy
- 2009 AVN Award - 'Best Transsexual Release' for America's Next Top Tranny 2
- 2009 AVN Award - 'Best Transsexual Series' for Transsexual Babysitters
- 2011 XBIZ Award - 'Transsexual Release of the Year' for America's Next Top Tranny: Season 6
- 2012 AVN Award - 'Best Transsexual Series' for America's Next Top Tranny
- 2012 XBIZ Award - 'Interracial Series of the Year' for Interracial Swingers
- 2013 XBIZ Award Nominee - 'Vignette Series of the Year' for Don't Tell My Wife...
- 2014 XBIZ Award - 'All-Girl Release of the Year' for The Seduction of Riley Reid
- 2015 XBIZ Award - 'All-Black Release of the Year' for The Seduction of Skin Diamond
