= Nikki Benz =

Ukrainian-Canadian/American pornographic film actress

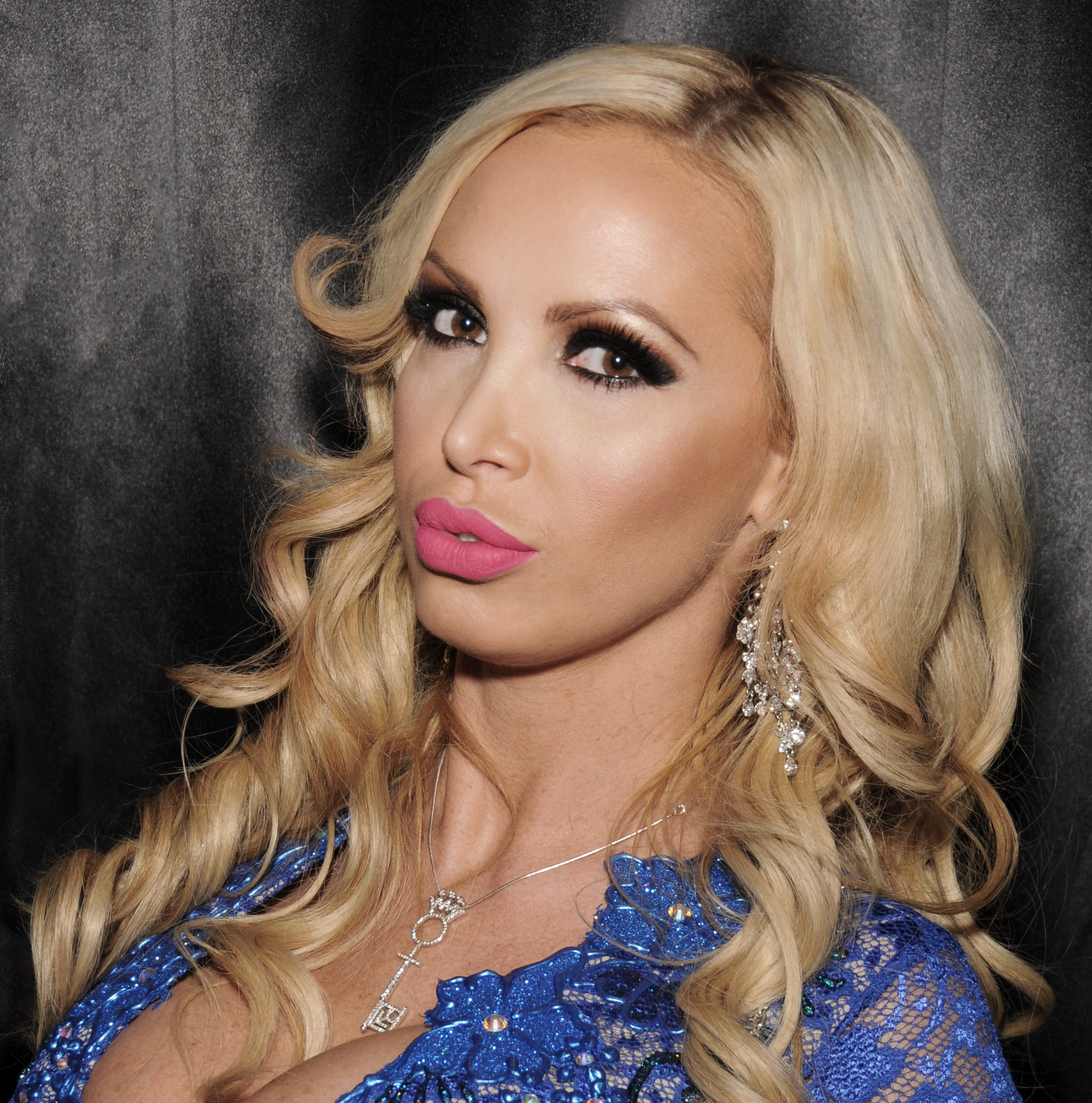
- Benz in 2014
- Born: December 11, 1981 (age 44); Ukrainian Soviet Socialist Republic, Soviet Union
- Citizenship: Canada; United States
- Years active: 2003–present
- Website: nikkibenz.com

Nikki Benz (born December 11, 1981) is a Canadian and American pornographic film actress. She was named the 2011 Penthouse Pet of the Year.

== Early life ==
Benz was born on December 11, 1981, in Ukraine and raised in Canada, growing up in the Etobicoke area of Toronto. She became a U.S. citizen in February 2013.

== Career ==
Benz worked as a swimsuit model and stripper prior to her porn career. She entered the adult film industry by e-mailing porn director Jim Gunn, who introduced her to Frank Kay, the president of Pleasure Productions. She signed with Pleasure Productions in January 2003 and made her first on-screen sex scene in Strap on Sally 20 with Gina Lynn, and her first boy-girl scene with Ben English in The Sweetest Thing. After completing her contract, Benz moved to Los Angeles and signed with Jill Kelly Productions in September 2004. Benz signed a contract with TeraVision in September 2005. She was the Penthouse Pet of the Month for April 2010, and the magazine's cover girl and feature in the May 2008 issue. Benz was named Penthouse Pet of the Year 2011.

In June 2016, Brazzers signed Benz to be its first brand ambassador to promote their products. Several months later, Benz alleged that she was assaulted on a shoot for the website. She alleged that the director of the scene, Tony T., choked her after she asked the shoot to be stopped. A representative for Tony T. denied the charges, and Brazzers ended its relationship with him after the allegation. Several other performers including Dana DeArmond, Carter Cruise, Shawna Leneé, and Devon later came forward with similar accusations about the director.

The same day that Benz reported the alleged assault to the police, Tony T. and Ramon Nomar, her co-star in the scene, filed a lawsuit against Benz and Brazzers for defamation. Nomar dropped out as a plaintiff in early 2017. In 2018, Benz filed a lawsuit against Brazzers and its parent company MindGeek, alleging battery, assault, sexual battery, and gender violence.

=== Appearances ===
Along with Lisa Ann and Sean Michaels, Benz co-hosted the XRCO Awards in April 2010. Benz has made several appearances on the FoxSports.com show Cubed, playing a wise-cracking, sports-savvy cleaning lady.

In 2012, Benz was featured in a video game, Saints Row: The Third – Penthouse Pack, released by Volition. She also appeared in a music video, Lose Yourself. In 2013, she appeared briefly in the film Pain and Gain.

=== Other ventures ===
Benz hosted a show on KSEX called Contract Superstars alongside Lacie Heart, Ashley Steele, Stormy Daniels, and Tyler Faith but quit citing "time constraints". In 2015, Benz and fellow adult performer Alexis Texas exposed their breasts in Times Square to advocate for gender equality.

== Toronto mayoral campaign ==
In May 2014, Benz announced her candidacy to run for mayor of the Canadian city of Toronto via her Twitter account. She decided to fight against Rob Ford for Toronto mayor. The announcement was subsequently covered by the Huffington Post, TMZ, and in a Playboy.com interview. The news also gained international attention via Yahoo France, Britain, and Finland.

On May 28, 2014, Benz tried to submit her application to run for mayor of Toronto, but the city would not accept her application because her Ontario driver's license had already expired. It was not known at the time whether she would reapply to run for mayor. In the Playboy interview, Benz discussed various campaign issues including gay rights, economic stimulation for the city, and public transportation. Her platform included supporting and raising funds for the Downtown Relief Line, a proposed addition to Toronto's mass transit system. She also commented on former mayor Rob Ford's substance abuse and his break from campaigning while he attended to his drug rehabilitation. In the interview, Benz cited her honesty and transparency, her love of her home city, and concern for its people. She also vowed to donate half of her salary as mayor to a cause chosen by its citizens.

== Awards and nominations ==
List of accolades
Awards and nominations
Award	Won	Nominated
AVN Awards	1	8
F.A.M.E. Awards	0	4
NightMoves Awards	2	2
XBIZ Awards	1	5
Penthouse	1	1
- Total number of wins and nominations
Totals	5	20

Year	Ceremony	Result	Award
2006	AVN Award	Nominated	Best Couples Sex Scene, Video – Take No Prisoners
2006	AVN Award	Nominated	Best Supporting Actress, Video – Jack's Teen America 2
2006	AVN Award	Nominated	Best Tease Performance – Take No Prisoners
2008	AVN Award	Nominated	Best Three-Way Sex Scene – Meet the Fuckers 6
2008	F.A.M.E. Award	Finalist	Hottest Body
2009	F.A.M.E. Award	Finalist	Hottest Body
2010	XBIZ Award	Nominated	Female Performer of the Year
2010	XBIZ Award	Nominated	Crossover Star of the Year
2010	XBIZ Award	Nominated	Pornstar Website of the Year – NikkiBenz.com
2010	AVN Award	Nominated	Best All-Girl Three-Way Sex Scene – Penthouse: Slave for a Night
2010	F.A.M.E. Award	Finalist	Hottest Body
2010	F.A.M.E. Award	Finalist	Favorite Breasts
2011	Penthouse	Won	Penthouse Pet of the Year
2011	NightMoves Award	Won	Best Feature Entertainer (Editor's Choice)
2012	AVN Award	Nominated	Best Crossover Star
2012	NightMoves Award	Won	Best Feature Entertainer (Fan's Choice)
2013	XBIZ Award	Nominated	Crossover Star of the Year
2013	AVN Award	Nominated	Best Pornstar Website – NikkiBenz.com
2015	XBIZ Award	Won	Crossover Star of the Year
2016	AVN Award	Won	Hall of Fame

1970s	Evelyn Treacher	Stephanie McLean	Tina McDowall	Patricia Barrett	Avril Lund
1970s	Anneka Di Lorenzo	Laura Bennett Doone	Victoria Lynn Johnson	Dominique Maure	Cheryl Rixon
1980s	Isabella Ardigo	Danielle Deneux	Corinne Alphen	Sheila Kennedy	Linda Kenton
1980s	None	Cody Carmack	Mindy Farrar	Patty Mullen	Ginger Miller
1990s	Stephanie Page	Simone Brigitte	Jisel	Julie Strain	Sasha Vinni
1990s	Gina LaMarca	Andi Sue Irwin	Elizabeth Ann Hilden	Paige Summers	Nikie St. Gilles
2000s	Juliet Cariaga	Zdeňka Podkapová	Megan Mason	Sunny Leone	Victoria Zdrok
2000s	Martina Warren	Jamie Lynn	Heather Vandeven	Erica Ellyson	Taya Parker
2010s	Taylor Vixen	Nikki Benz	Jenna Rose	Nicole Aniston	Lexi Belle
2010s	Layla Sin	Kenna James	Jenna Sativa	Gina Valentina	Gianna Dior
2020s	Lacy Lennon	Kenzie Anne	Amber Marie	Tahlia Paris	Renee Olstead
2020s	Kassie Wallis	-	-	-	-
