= James Bartholet =

American actor

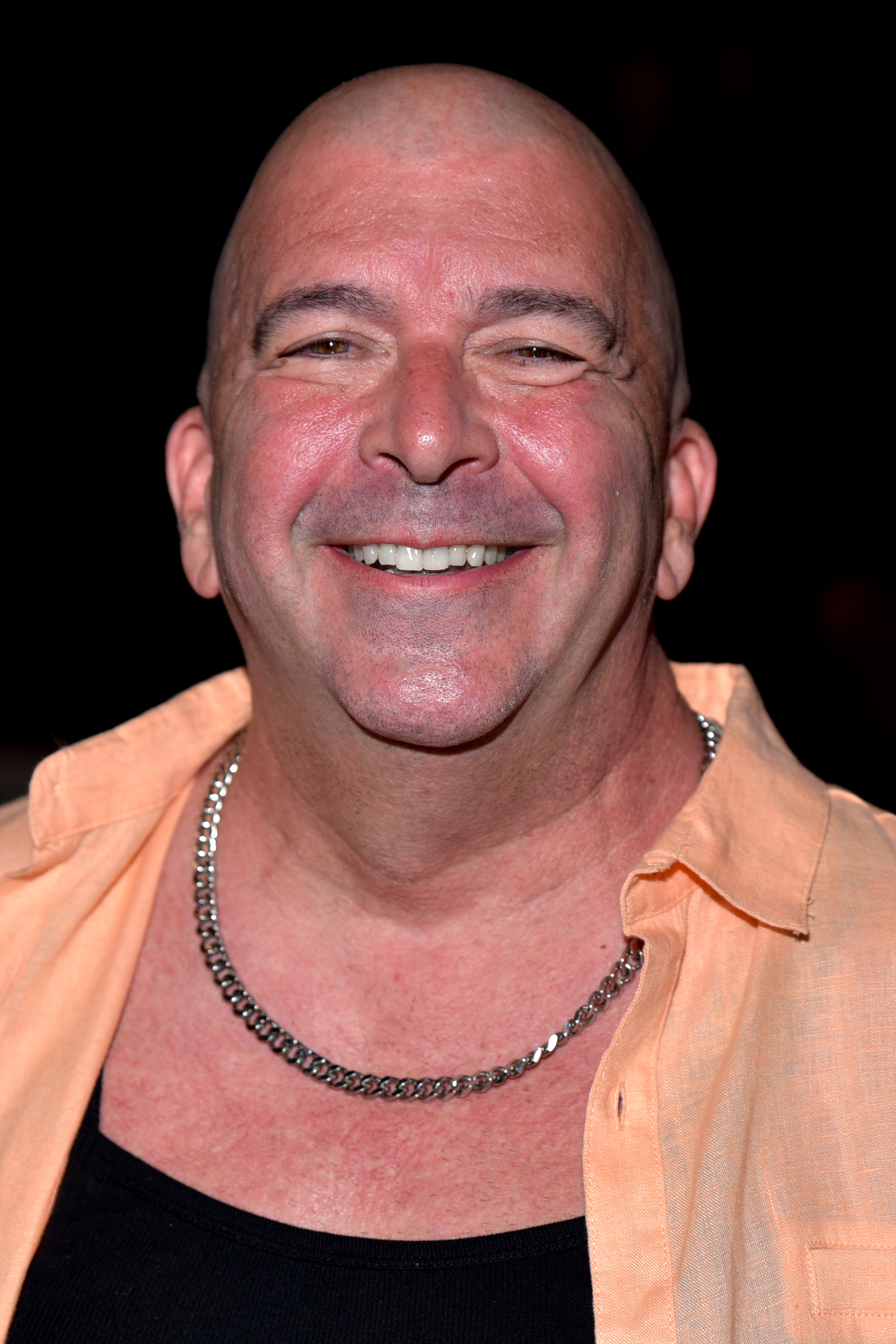
- James Bartholet in 2019
- Born: Berkeley, California

James Bartholet is an American actor and television, radio, and Internet host.

== Career ==
Bartholet came to Hollywood in the early 1980s.

Since then, he has worked for directors such as Blake Edwards and David Lynch and appeared in many films, television programs, sitcoms and soap operas in the 1980s and 1990s. His credits include General Hospital, Beauty and The Beast, "Night Court", Eve of Destruction and The Last American Virgin. He starred in the pilot episode of The Boneheads for HBO for director George Palelei.

Bartholet also acted on stage, beginning his acting career in Northern California, and has appeared in several award-winning productions and been nominated for and received several best acting awards.

Bartholet created L. A. Nitelife, a cable television program in the Los Angeles area, and also hosted the L.A. Nitelife radio show, which originally aired on 870 AM KIEV, then moved to 97.1 FM KLSX, and to Newstalk 870 the new KRLA. Bartholet and the program were recognized by the City of Los Angeles with a proclamation by the city for his program and his contribution to increasing tourism and the nightlife in Southern California.

Bartholet also hosted Tonite With James Bartholet on the now defunct KSEX, and is the host of the long running radio program; Inside The Industry, which airs on Wednesday nights on latalkradio.com.

He has also worked as a contributing writer to such publications as BOLD magazine, LA2NITE.COM, Hollywood.com, LA Reader, LA Weekly, GenuineNightlife.com, Excess magazine, Rock City News, Santa Clara Vision in Silicon Valley, and Entertainment Today. He has also worked as an entertainment reporter and host for various national television programs, and several Pay Per View Specials.

He performed several times onstage at the Comedy Store on Sunset Strip as part of the Hot Tamales Live sketch comedy troupe.

He hosts AVN Live, broadcast on AVN.com, and is the owner of Galaxy Publicity and Management. He has worked as an emcee and announcer, at pageants for Hawaiian Tropics and Venus Swimwear, and for the Hollywood Christmas Parade for several years.

=== Pornography cameos ===
Bartholet has gained an international audience by appearing in many "sex and non-sex acting roles" in many Adult Film features as well. Some of his many releases include: Barbarella XXX: An Axel Braun Parody, 9 1/2 Weeks: An Erotic Parody, The Wizard of Oz XXX, Not The Three Stooges XXX, Men In Black: A Hardcore Parody, Hotel No Tell 1 & 2, On the Air, Spiderman Vs. Superman XXX, American Hustle XXX, Supernatural XXX, The Fast & The Furious XXX, Grease XXX, The Beverly Hillbillies XXX, The Love Boat XXX, Mac Guyver XXX, Jersey Boys XXX, Beauty And The Beast XXX, Cinderella XXX, Sleeping Beauty XXX, The Real Boogie Nights, Casting Couch Cuties, Ava Rose Stripped, Exxxtra Exxxtra, The Rocki Whore Picture Show, Flight Attendants/Not Airplane XXX, Not M.A.S.H. XXX, Breaking Bad XXX, J-Ho, This Ain't The Partridge Family XXX, This Ain't Happy Days XXX, Not Three's Company XXX and Official Halloween Parody. He won the 2011 AVN Award for Best Non-Sex Performance for his role in Not Charlie's Angels XXX. In 2013 he received several XBIZ Award nominations and in 2014 won an XBIZ Award for his role in Not the Wizard of Oz XXX.
