= The Score Group =

American adult-entertainment publishing company

Quad International, Inc. dba The Score Group
- Company type: Private
- Industry: Pornography
- Founded: 1991; 35 years ago
- Headquarters: Miami, Florida, United States
- Products: Pornographic films Pornographic magazines Internet pornography
- Number of employees: ~50
- Website: www.scoregroup.com

Quad International, Inc., doing business as The Score Group, is an independent publishing company based in Miami, Florida that engages in the production and distribution of adult entertainment. Founded in 1991, The Score Group (TSG) publishes several monthly magazines including its flagship publication Score, and several others including Voluptuous, 18eighteen, Naughty Neighbors and Leg Sex. TSG also publishes quarterly magazines including, XL, 40something, 50Plus Milfs, 60Plus Milfs and New Cummers, as well as a mainstream men's magazine Looker. In addition it distributes adult content through its websites which include Scoreland.com, SCOREVideos.com, PornMegaLoad.com, Voluptuous.com, 18eighteen.com, XLgirls.com, LegSex.com, 40SomethingMag.com, 50PlusMilfs.com, 60PlusMilfs.com and NewCummers.com. The publishing company also produces and distributes full-length adult films under its Score Videos label.

== Magazines ==
- Score specializes in photographs of women with large breasts, either naturally larger or augmented.
- Voluptuous features busty women who have had no breast augmentations.
- 18eighteen: A magazine dedicated to women who are presented as 18 or 19 years old.
- Naughty Neighbors: Nude photos of models present as ordinary "girl next door" types.
- Leg Sex is a magazine dedicated to leg fetishism, and features photos of women's legs.
- Bootylicious features photos primarily of Black and Hispanic women, concentrating on their buttocks (i.e. their "booty").
- XL Girls: A spinoff of Voluptuous which was originally called Voluptuous XL dedicated to very full-figured women, curvier than Voluptuous magazine models. This magazine features larger women who are generally referred to as BBW, rubenesque, or plumpers.
- 40Something features photos primarily of older women who are 40 years old or older.
- 50Plus MILFs features photos primarily of older women who are 50 years old or older.
- 60Plus MILFs features photos primarily of older women who are 60 years old or older.
- New Cummers features models who are new to the adult industry.

== Award nominations ==
- 2010 XBIZ Award Nominee - Emerging Affiliate Program of the Year
