= New Sensations (studio) =

American pornographic film studio

- Type: Private
- Industry: Pornography
- Founded: 1993; 33 years ago
- Headquarters: Chatsworth, Los Angeles, California, U.S.
- Area served: Worldwide
- Products: Pornographic films
- Subsidiaries: Digital Sin; PurePassion; HotwifeXXX
- Website: www.newsensations.com

New Sensations is an American pornographic film studio. It is the parent company and sister-label of Digital Sin, PurePassion and HotwifeXXX. New Sensations was founded in 1993; The first films it produced were the Video Virgins series, which ran from 1993 to 1998. In 2006 it was described by Reuters as one of the handful of studios that dominate the U.S. porn industry.

The studio has released several porn versions of popular media (usually titled "[original title]: A XXX Parody") including The X-Files, Scrubs, Scooby-Doo, The Flintstones, That '70s Show, The Office, Who's the Boss?, and 30 Rock.

== Awards ==
- 1995 AVN Award – 'Best Amateur Series' for Video Virgins
- 2000 AVN Award – 'Best All-Girl Release' for The Four Finger Club 2
- 2001 AVN Award – 'Best Special Effects' for Intimate Expressions
- 2001 AVN Award – 'Best Video Feature' for Dark Angels
- 2001 AVN Award – 'Best Videography' – Jake Jacobs & Nic Andrews for Dark Angels
- 2004 AVN Award – 'Best Solo Sex Scene' for Brook Ballentyne in Screaming Orgasms 11
- 2005 AVN Award – 'Best Foreign All-Sex Series' for Pleasures of the Flesh
- 2005 AVN Award – 'Best Three-Way Sex Scene' – Dani Woodward, Barrett Blade & Kurt Lockwood for Erotic Stories: Lovers & Cheaters
- 2006 AVN Award – 'Best Videography' – Nic Andrews for Dark Angels 2: Bloodline
- 2008 AVN Award – 'Best Big Bust Series' for Big Natural Breasts
- 2009 AVN Award – 'Best New Series' for Ashlynn Goes to College
- 2009 AVN Award – 'Best Continuing Series' for Ashlynn Goes to College
- 2009 AVN Award – 'Best Vignette Series' for Cheating Wives Tales
- 2010 AVN Award for Best All-Sex Series for Addicted
- 2011 XBIZ Award – 'Peoples Choice – Porn Parody of the Year' for The Office: A XXX Parody
- 2011 AVN Award – Best New Series – The Romance Series
- 2011 Feminist Porn Award – Steamiest Romantic Movie – A Little Part of Me
- 2011 XBIZ Award – Parody Studio of the Year
- 2011 XBIZ Award – 'Parody Release of the Year' for The Big Lebowski: A XXX Parody
- 2012 XBIZ Award – 'Feature Studio of the Year'
- 2012 XBIZ Award – 'Couples-Themed Release of the Year' for Love is a Dangerous Game
- 2012 AVN Award – 'Best Young Girl Series'
- 2013 XBIZ Award Nominee – 'Feature Movie of the Year' for Love, Marriage & Other Bad Ideas, The Friend Zone, and Torn; also 'All-Sex Release of the Year' for Glam-Core. Other nominations include: 'Couples-Themed Release of the Year' for Friends With Benefits, The Friend Zone, Love, Marriage and Other Bad Ideas, Torn and Shared Wives; also 'Couples-Themed Line of the Year' for Swingers Series; 'All-Girl Release of the Year' for Against Her Will
- 2013 XBIZ Award – 'Studio of the Year'
- 2013 XBIZ Award – 'All-Sex Series of the Year' for Pretty Dirty
- 2013 XBIZ Award – 'Couples-Themed Release of the Year' for Torn
- 2013 XBIZ Award – 'Couples-Themed Line of the Year' for Romance Series
- 2013 XBIZ Award – 'Best Actor (Feature Movie)' – Steven St. Croix for Torn
- 2013 XBIZ Award – 'Best Actress (Couples-Themed Release)' – Remy LaCroix for Torn
- 2013 XBIZ Award – 'Best Actor (Couples-Themed Release)' – Richie Calhoun for Love, Marriage & Other Bad Ideas
- 2013 XBIZ Award – 'Best Actress (All-Girl Release)' – Sheridan Love for Against Her Will
- 2013 XBIZ Award – 'Screenplay of the Year' – Jacky St. James for Torn
- 2014 XBIZ Award – 'All-Sex Series of the Year' for Pretty Dirty
- 2014 XBIZ Award – 'Couples-Themed Line of the Year' for Romance Series
- 2014 XBIZ Award – 'Screenplay of the Year' for The Temptation of Eve (Jacky St. James)
- 2015 XBIZ Award – 'Couples-Themed Release of the Year' for The Sexual Liberation of Anna Lee
- 2016 XBIZ Award – 'Vignette Release of the Year' for A Hotwife Blindfolded

== Digital Sin ==

Digital Sin was founded by Scott Taylor in 1999. The company originally licensed other studios' films for CD-ROMs, and then DVDs; however, it now releases content produced by New Sensations. Digital Sin released an interactive DVD called Groupie Love, which featured the rappers 50 Cent and Lloyd Banks.

=== Awards ===
- 2003 XRCO Award – 'Best Girl-Girl Scene' for Jenna Jameson & Carmen Luvana in My Plaything: Jenna Jameson 2
- 2004 AVN Award – 'Best Interactive DVD' for My Plaything: Jenna Jameson 2
- 2005 AVN Award – 'Best Interactive DVD' for Groupie Love
- 2008 AVN Award – 'Best Oral-Themed Release' for Face Full of Diesel
- 2007 AVN Award – 'Best Solo Release' for I Love Big Toys 2
- 2007 AVN Award – 'Best Interracial Series' for My Hot Wife Is Fucking Blackzilla
- 2009 AVN Award – 'Best Interactive DVD' for My Plaything: Ashlynn Brooke
- 2013 XBIZ Award Nomination – 'All-Sex Release of the Year' for Meet Blondie and The Innocence of Youth; Additional nominations include: 'All-Sex Series of the Year' for The Innocence of Youth and High Heels and Panties; also 'Vignette Series of the Year' for The Innocence of Youth
- 2015 XBIZ Award – 'All-Sex Release of the Year' for Meet Carter Cruise
- 2017 DVDEROTIK Award – 'GangBang of the Year' for My Sisters first GangBang 2
