= Naughty America =

Pornographic film studio

- Type: Private
- Industry: Pornography
- Founded: June 2001; 25 years ago
- Headquarters: San Diego, California, U.S.
- Area served: Worldwide
- Products: Pornographic films
- Website: naughtyamerica.com

Naughty America is an independent pornographic film studio based in San Diego, California.

== History ==
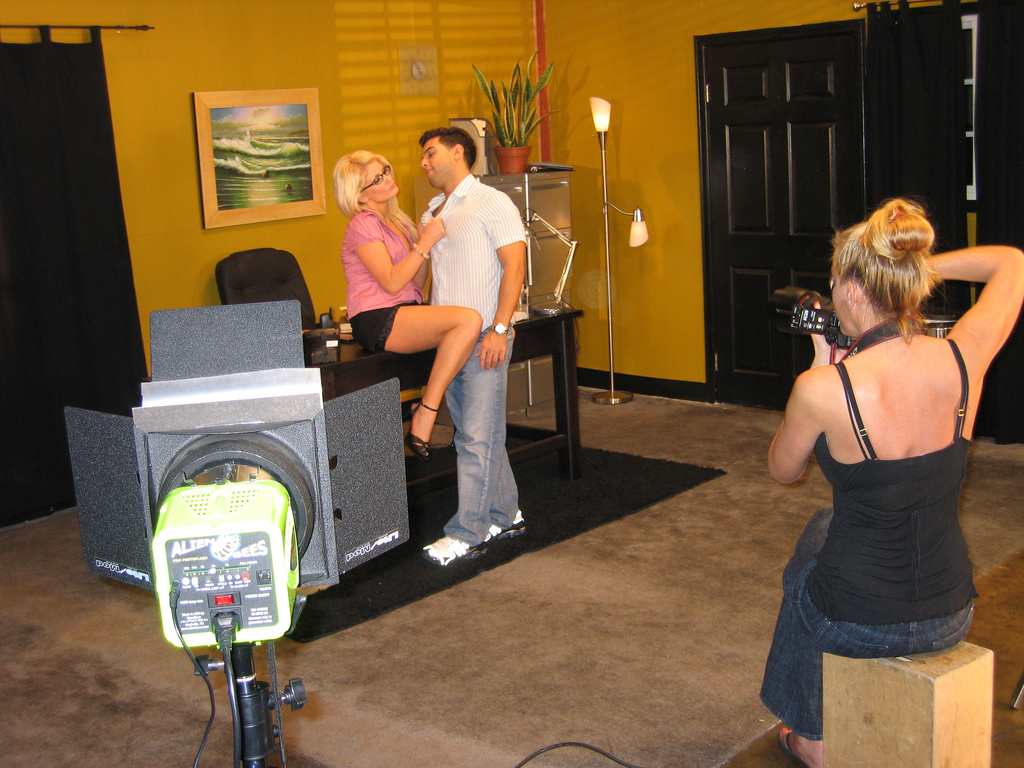
On the set of Naughty America (2007)

The Naughty America registered trademark has been used since 2004 to market Adult Entertainment. The date 1776 in its logo refers to the United States Declaration of Independence in which Thomas Jefferson declared the right of “Life, liberty, and the pursuit of happiness.” La Touraine Inc., a Nevada corporation, based in San Diego, is the owner of the Trademark/Service Mark Naughty America.

In December 2005, Naughty America announced the online game Naughty America: The Game.

In 2008, the company employed over 60 staff members and has released over 70 DVDs. These DVDs are distributed worldwide by Pureplay Media since November 2005. In addition to the DVDs, they also have over 6,900 movies on their site.

The company launched a gay line called Suite 703 in January 2008.

In October 2008, Naughty America launched an Adobe Air-based application called Naughty America Direct, which was described as "basically an iTunes for porn". It sold individual full-length DRM-free scenes with no subscription. It was shut down shortly thereafter due to the departure of the developer in charge.

In June 2010, Naughty America announced Eddie Arenas as its new Chief Executive Officer and President.

In January 2014, Naughty America began shooting in ultra-high-definition.

In January 2016, Naughty America announced adult virtual reality at the Consumer Electronics Show in Las Vegas.

Author, "Leopard J. Ferry", a former Naughty America employee, between 2007 and 2009, wrote the novel Erovinia, based on his employment.

== Awards ==
Naughty America have been nominated for AVN awards on many occasions. In 2008 Naughty America/Pure Play Media won the AVN Best Ethnic-Themed Series (Asian) award for the Asian 1 on 1 series. They also won the 2011 AVN Best Ethnic-Themed Series (Latin) award for the Latin Adultery series.

In 2012, they won the XBIZ Awards for Latin-Themed Series of the Year for 'Latin Adultery' and Studio Site of the Year for NaughtyAmerica.com.

In 2013, they received multiple XBIZ Award nominations including 'Studio of the Year' and 'Vignette Series of the Year' for My Sister's Hot Friend Vol. 25 and Tonight's Girlfriend Vol. 7. Additional nominations include 'Vignette Series of the Year' for My Wife's Hot Friend. They won numerous XBIZ Awards for 'Vignette Series of the Year' and 'New Series of the Year' for Tonight's Girlfriend, 'Latin-Themed Series of the Year' for Latin Adultery, and 'Studio Site of the Year'.

In 2014, they received the XBIZ Award in the category of 'Vignette Series of the Year' for "Tonight's Girlfriend."
