= 26th AVN Awards =

US adult industry award ceremony in 2009

- Date: January 10, 2009
- Site: Mandalay Bay Events Center; Paradise, Nevada
- Hosted by: Thea Vidale; Belladonna; Jenna Haze
- Preshow hosts: Kirsten Price; Dave Navarro
- Produced by: Gary Miller
- Directed by: Mark Stepp

Highlights
- Best Picture: Cry Wolf (Best Film)
- Most awards: Pirates II: Stagnetti's Revenge (15)
- Most nominations: Pirates II: Stagnetti's Revenge (30)

Television coverage
- Network: Showtime
- Duration: Nearly 2 hours

The 26th AVN Awards ceremony, presented by Adult Video News (AVN), honored the best pornographic movies of 2008 and took place on January 10, 2009, at the Mandalay Bay Events Center in Paradise, Nevada. During the ceremony, Adult Video News presented AVN Awards (commonly referred to as Oscars of porn) in 127 categories released between Oct. 1, 2007 and Sept. 30, 2008. The ceremony, televised in the United States by Showtime, was produced by Gary Miller. Comedian Thea Vidale hosted the show for the second time, joined on stage by actresses Belladonna and Jenna Haze.

Pirates II: Stagnetti's Revenge won 15 awards, the most of the evening, including Best Video Feature and Best Director for Joone. Other winners included Fallen and Cheerleaders with four awards each and Icon, Not Bewitched XXX, and Big Wet Asses 13 with three apiece. Subsequent to the broadcast on Showtime, the show was issued on a two-disc DVD with hardcore excerpts of winning scenes added as extras.

== Winners and nominees ==
The nominees for the 26th AVN Awards were announced on November 25, 2008, at 3:30 p.m. PST (23:30 UTC) in a press release, by David Sullivan. Pirates II: Stagnetti's Revenge received the most nominations with an unprecedented 30.

The winners were announced during the awards ceremony on January 10, 2009. Cry Wolf won what was to be the final award for Best Film; the award was discontinued the next year as film production gave way to digital video. Joone and Belladonna each won the most individual awards with three apiece, while projects they directed scooped up several more. The coveted performer of the year awards were won by Stoya (new starlet), Jenna Haze and James Deen.

=== Major Awards ===
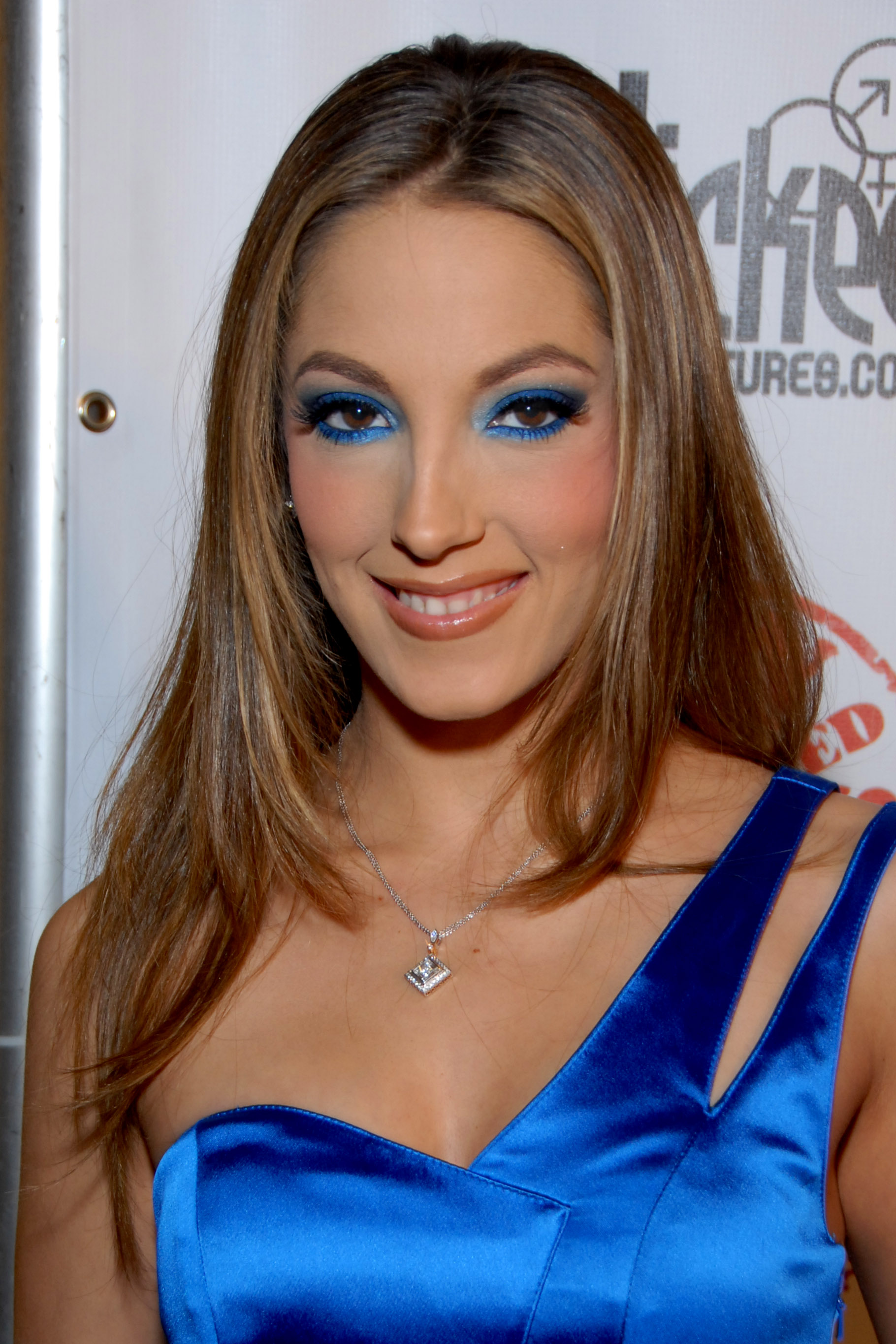
Jenna Haze, Female Performer of the Year winner

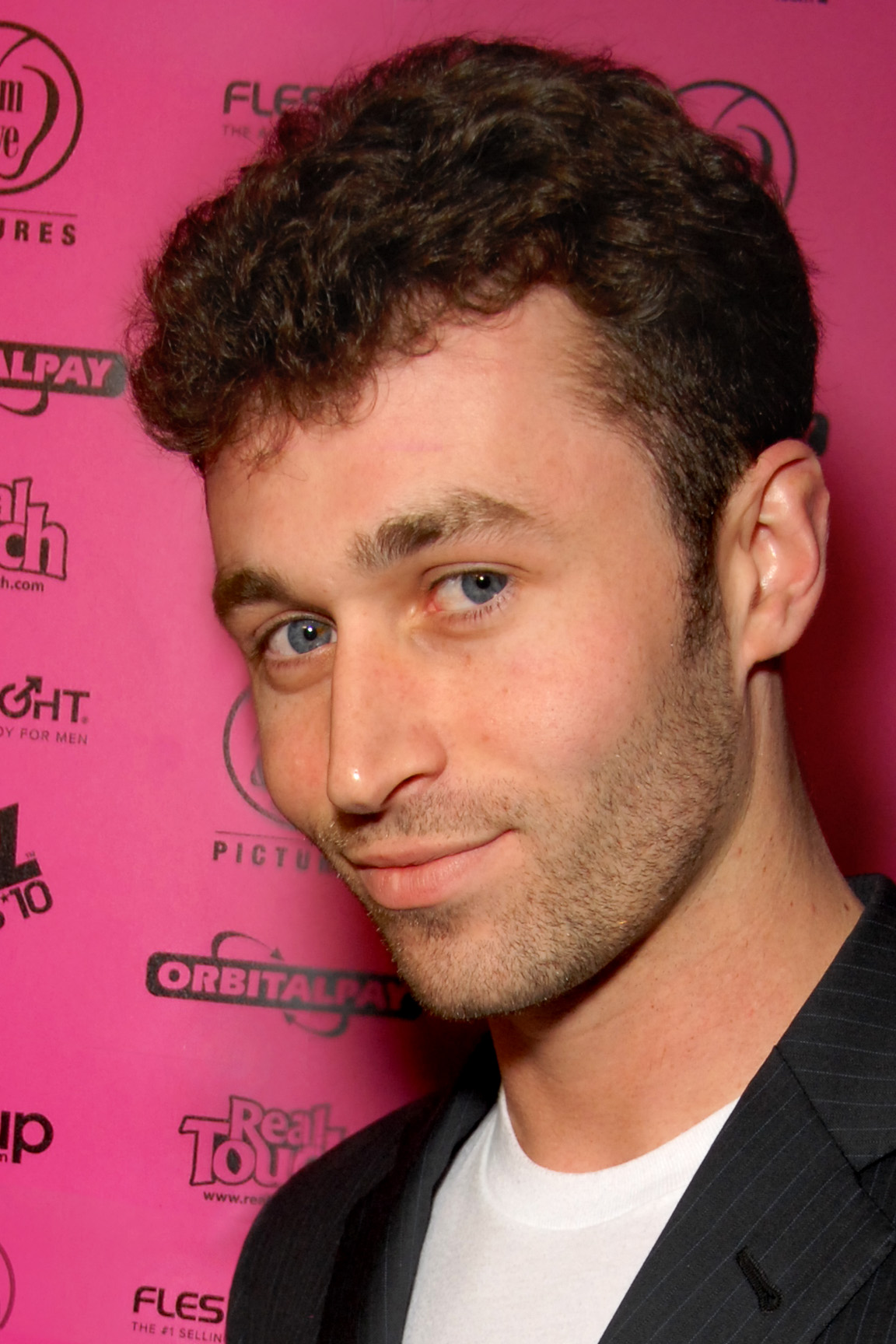
James Deen, Male Performer of the Year winner at the age of 22, making him the youngest actor to have won this award.

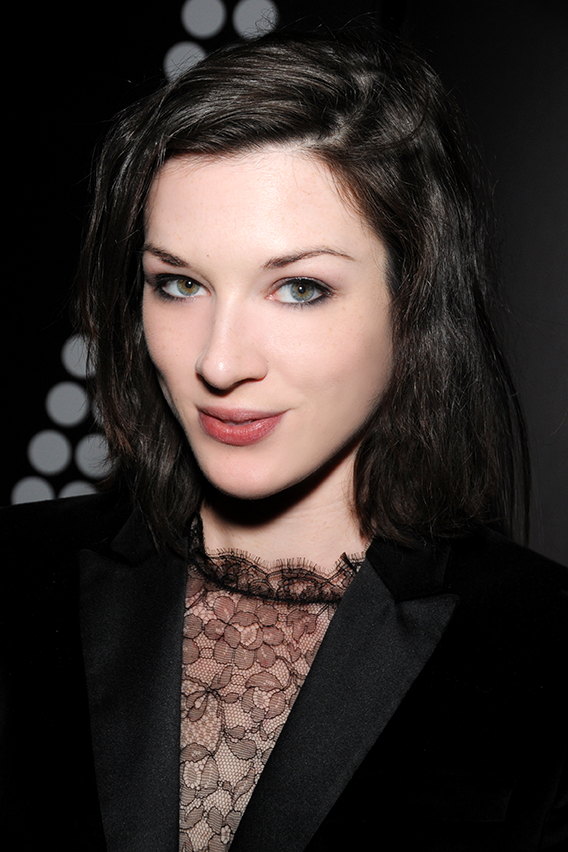
Stoya, Best New Starlet winner

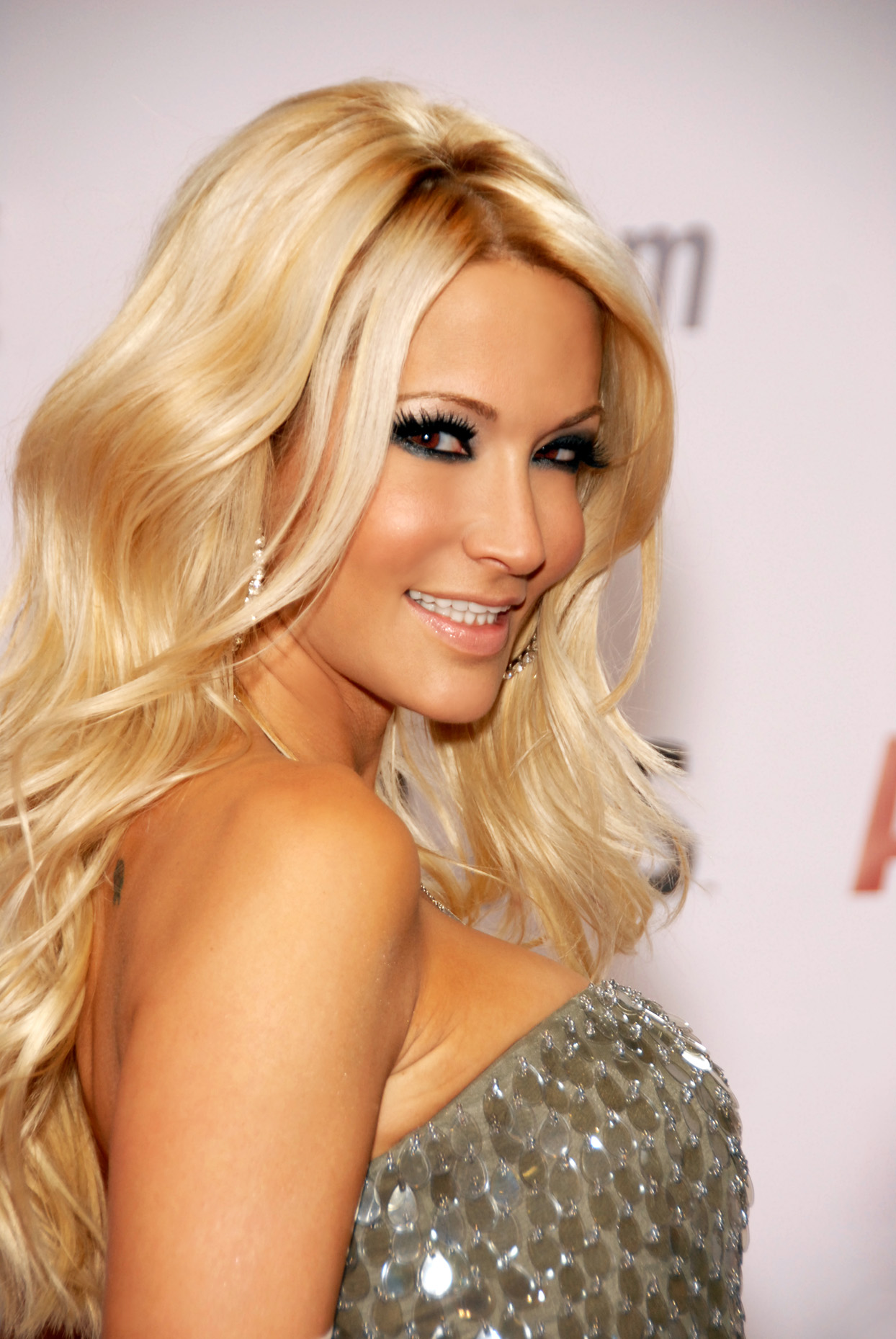
Jessica Drake, Best Actress winner

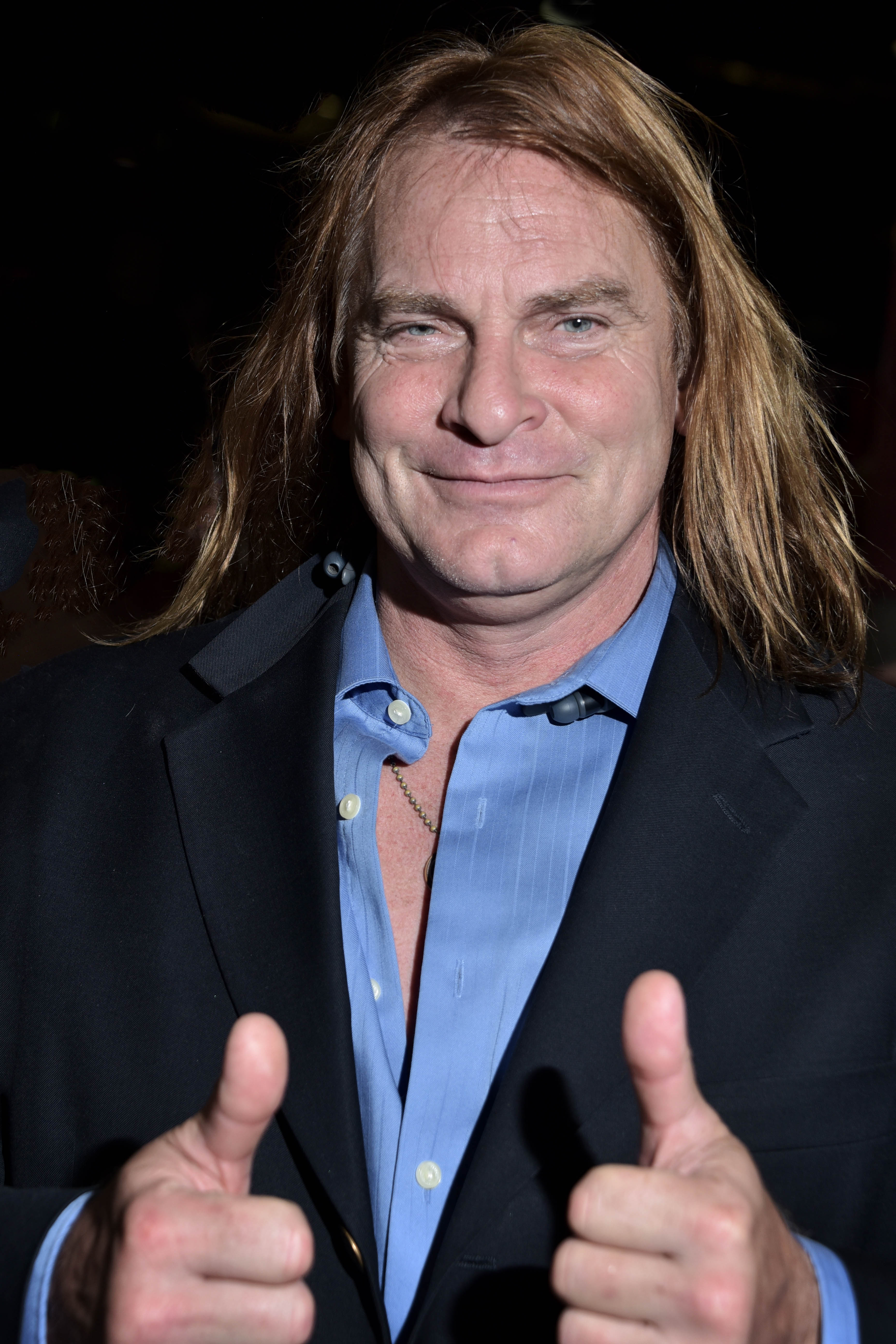
Evan Stone, Best Actor winner

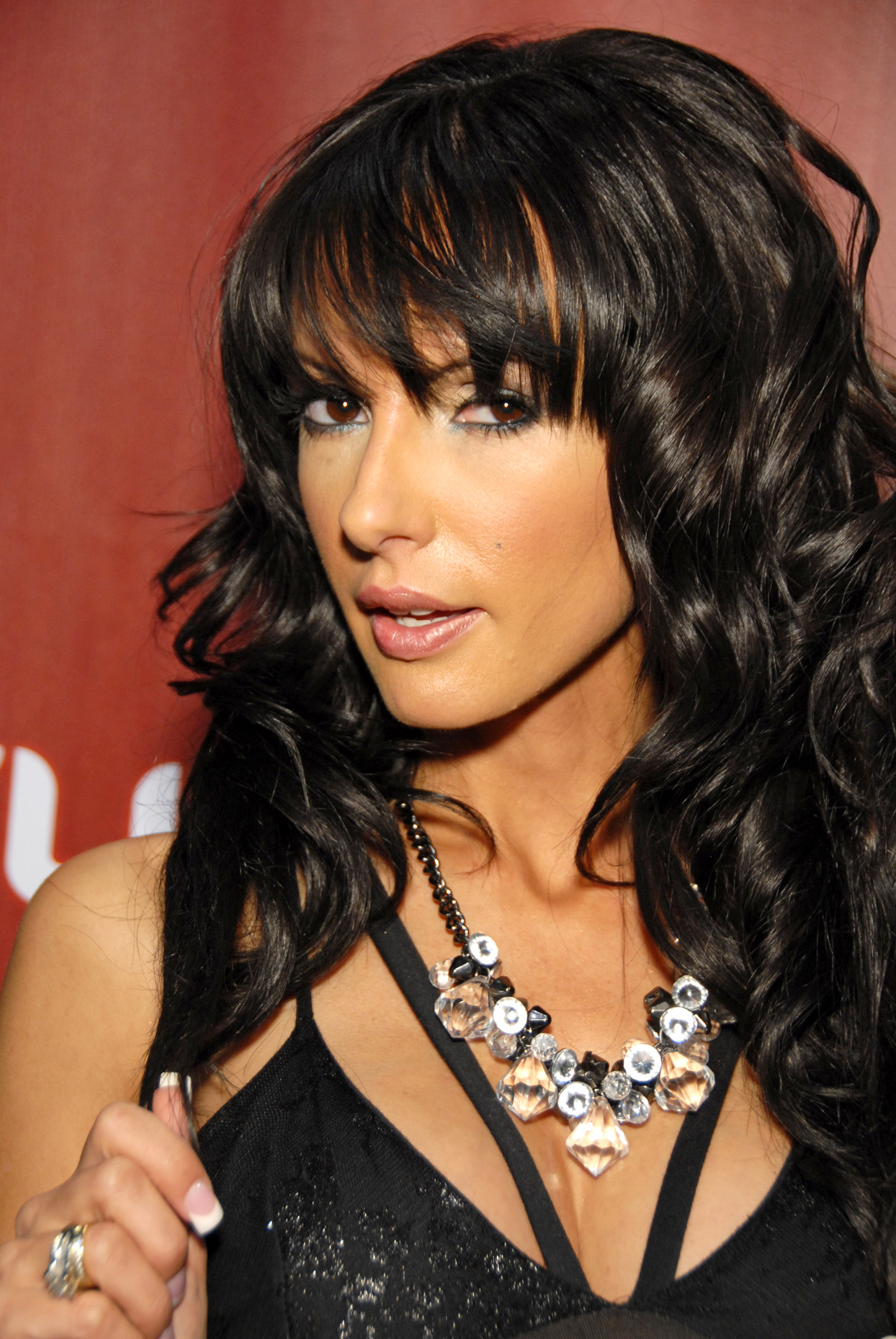
Catalina Cruz, Web Starlet of the Year winner

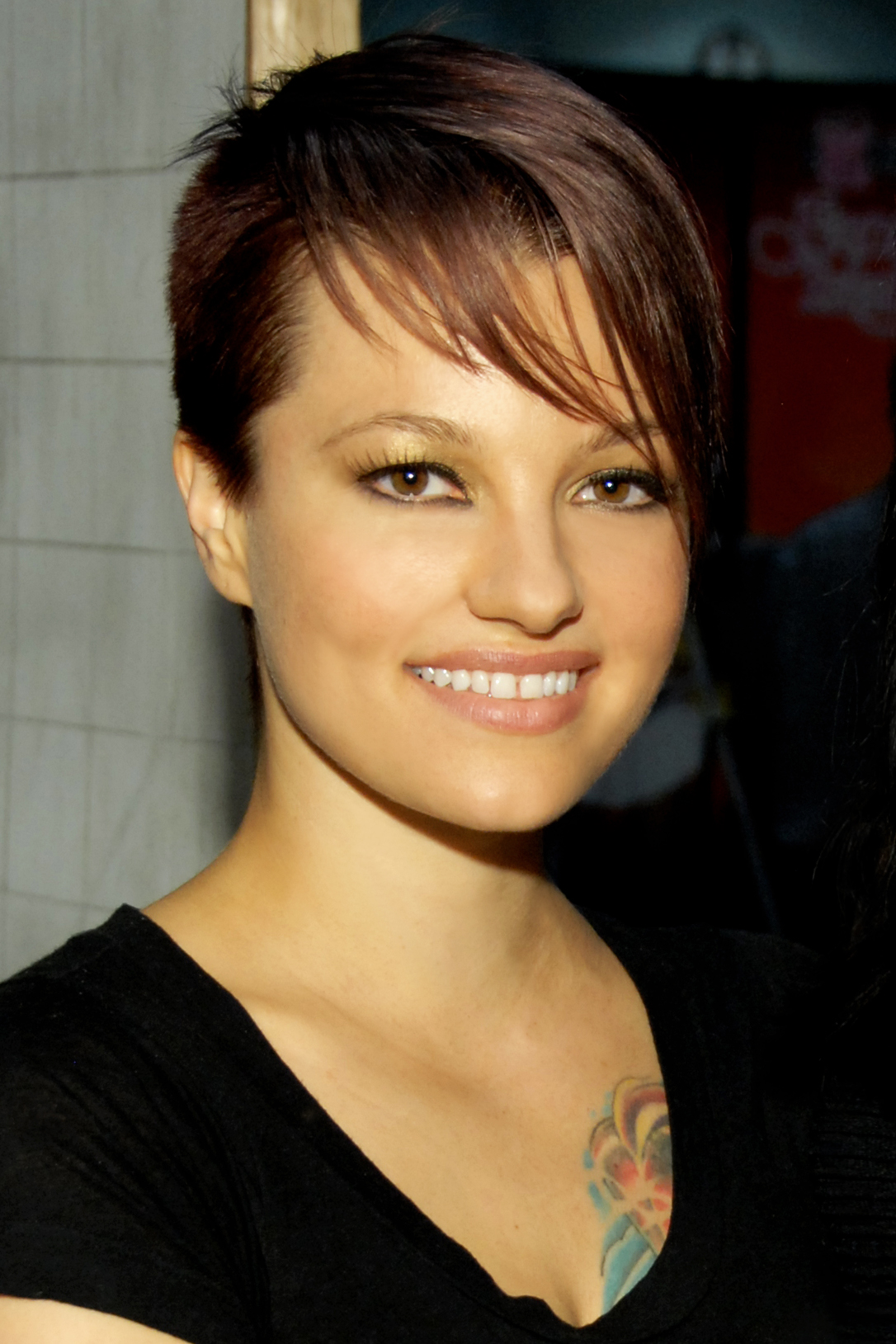
Belladonna, Best Supporting Actress winner, Best Girl-Girl Scene and Best All-Girl 3-Way Scene co-winner

Winners are listed first and highlighted in boldface.

| Best Video Feature | Best Film |
|---|---|
| **Pirates II: Stagnetti's Revenge**; Bad Luck Betties; Carolina Jones and the Broken Covenant; Dark City; The Doll Underground; Fallen; Hearts & Minds II: Modern Warfare; Little Runaway 2; Miles From Needles; Ransom; Roller Dollz; Succubus; Succubus of the Rouge; The Texas Vibrator Massacre; The Wicked | **Cry Wolf**; Burn; The Chauffeur's Daughter; House Pets; Paid Companions; X2 |
| Web Starlet of the Year | Best New Starlet |
| **Catalina Cruz**; Misty Anderson; Alison Angel; Rachel Aziani; Only Carla; Ruby Day; Sophie Dee; Jenna Haze; Lia 19; Gina Lynn; Kelly Madison; Anna Miller; Ariel Rebel; Puma Swede; Sweet Yurizan Beltran | **Stoya**; Lexi Belle; Tori Black; Chayse Evans; Jaelyn Fox; Jayden Jaymes; Jayme Langford; Jandi Lin; Meggan Mallone; Priya Rai; Faye Reagan; Ryder Skye; Missy Stone; Angelina Valentine |
| Male Performer of the Year | Female Performer of the Year |
| **James Deen**; Mark Ashley; Marco Banderas; Mick Blue; Tom Byron; Erik Everhard; Manuel Ferrara; Tommy Gunn; Shorty Mac; Nick Manning; Randy Spears; Michael Stefano; Steven St. Croix; Evan Stone | **Jenna Haze**; Belladonna; Ashlynn Brooke; Roxy DeVille; Jessica Drake; Sasha Grey; Jenny Hendrix; Jesse Jane; Kayden Kross; Sunny Lane; Sunny Leone; Rebeca Linares; Marie Luv; Gianna Michaels; Bobbi Starr; Alexis Texas |
| Best Actor | Best Actress |
| **Evan Stone - Pirates II: Stagnetti's Revenge**; Brad Armstrong - Fallen; Barrett Blade - The Wicked; Dino Bravo - Get Smartass; James Deen - The Chauffeur's Daughter; Manuel Ferrara - Pipe Dreams; Mike Horner - Not Bewitched XXX; Tyler Knight - Ransom; Tommy Gunn - Hearts and Minds II: Modern Warfare; Marcus London - Two; Mr. Marcus - Cry Wolf; Tommy Pistol - Horat; Randy Spears - The Last Rose; Justin Sterling - Burn; Lee Stone - This Ain't the Munsters XXX | **Jessica Drake - Fallen**; Monique Alexander - Cry Wolf; Roxy DeVille - The Texas Vibrator Massacre; Sasha Grey - The Last Rose; Carmen Hart - Fired; Jenna Haze - Not Bewitched XXX; Jenna Jameson - Burn; Jesse Jane - Pirates II: Stagnetti's Revenge; Janine Lindemulder - Pipe Dreams; Devon Lee - Succubus of the Rouge; Kaylani Lei - The Wicked; Marie McCray - Angel Face; Bree Olson - Roller Dollz; Kirsten Price - Mouth; Savanna Samson - Miles From Needles |
| Best Director — Feature | Top Selling Release |
| **Joone - Pirates II: Stagnetti's Revenge**; Brad Armstrong - Fallen; James Avalon - Roller Dollz; Bishop - Ransom; Ethan Kane - Carolina Jones and the Broken Covenant; Andre Madness - Hearts & Minds II: Modern Warfare; Rodney Moore - Night of the Giving Head; Jim Powers - Little Runaway 2; Michael Raven - The Wicked; Rob Rotten - The Texas Vibrator Massacre; Will Ryder - Not Bewitched XXX; B. Skow - Miles From Needles; Anton Slayer - This Ain't The Munsters XXX; Paul Thomas - Cry Wolf; Winkytiki - Bad Luck Betties | **Cheerleaders** |
Top Renting Release
**Cheerleaders**
| Best Sex Comedy | Best Gonzo Release |
| **Not Bewitched XXX**; Ashlynn Goes to College; Bad News Bitches 3; Bree's Sumber Party; Carmen Goes South; Cheating Affairs; Dancing with the Porn Stars; The HO.C.; Fired; Get Smartass; Horat; Kung Fu Nurses a Go-Go; Mary Carey Rocks; Night of the Giving Head; Not Another Porn Movie; This Ain't The Munsters XXX | **The Gauntlet 3**; 1 on 1; Beyond the Call of Booty 2; Buttman's Beautiful Brazilian Ass; Flesh Hunter 10; Fuck Truck; The Initiation of Nikki Jayne; Missy-Behavin'; Morgan Dayne's Deviant; Oil Overload; Perfect Match; Rachel's Choice; Slutty & Sluttier 6; Surfer Girls 2; Tera Goes Gonzo |
| Best Interracial Release | Best Interactive DVD |
| **Lex the Impaler 3**; Adventures Of Shorty Mac 10; Bangin' Black Boxes; Big Mann on Campus; Black Cock Slut; Black Ass Master; Black Owned 3; Black Power 3; Dark Meat 2; Dark Meat, Asian Treat 2; Lex on Blondes 4; Mandinka Parties 2; Race 2 Race; She Only Takes Diesel 5; Souled Out | **My Plaything: Ashlynn Brooke**; The Interactive Gina Lynn; Interactive Sex with Bree Olson; Total Interactive Control of Sasha Grey; Up Close and Virtual with Holly Sweet; Virtual Dreams: Natalie Heck; Virtual Sex with Katsuni; Virtual Vivid Girls: The Love Twins |
| Best Couples Sex Scene | Best Girl-Girl Sex Scene |
| **Monique Alexander, Mr. Marcus - Cry Wolf**; Casey Parker, Erik Everhard - Boy Crazy; Jesse Jane, Manuel Ferrara - Cheerleaders; Rebeca Linares, Scott Nails - Filth Cums First 3; Kendall Brooks, Tony DeSergio - I Have a Wife; Ashley Blue, Mick Blue - It's a Secretary Thing; Jenna Haze, Lexington Steele - Lex the Impaler 3; Brianna Love, James Deen - Manhandled 3; Teagan Presley, James Deen - Not Bewitched XXX; Gianna Michaels, Mark Ashley - Oil Overload; Shay Jordan, Steven St. Croix - Pirates II: Stagnetti's Revenge; Tori Black, Mark Ashley - Pretty as They Cum; Kayden Kross, Erik Everhard - Roller Dollz; Sindee Jennings, Shane Diesel - She Only Takes Diesel; Sunny Leone, Matt Erikson - Sunny Loves Matt; Lexi Belle, James Deen - Teenage Heartbreakers 2 | **Belladonna, Jesse Jane - Pirates II: Stagnetti's Revenge**; Ashlynn Brooke, Jenna Haze - Addicted 4; Belladonna, Lexi Belle - Belladonna's Fucking Girls 6; Anna Stevens, Amber Chase - Bellezza Video 8; Justine Joli, Marie Luv - By Appointment Only 6; Jana Jordan, Georgia Jones - Fem Vivace; Kelly Wells, Britney Stevens - Gape Lovers 2; Alexis Love, Tristan Kingsley - Girl Girl Studio 7; Mia Presley, Samantha Ryan - Girls Kissing Girls; Jayme Langford, Nicole Aston - Hot Showers 16; Eve Angel, Peaches - Inside Peaches; Elexis Monroe, Heather Silk - Lesbian Bridal Stories 2; Tera Wray, Franchezca Valentina - The Orifice; Bree Olson, Kayden Kross - Roller Dollz; Sunny Leone, Ann Marie Rios - Sunny Loves Matt; RayVeness, Zoe Britton - Women Seeking Women 44 |
| Best Anal Sex Scene | Best Oral Sex Scene |
| **Sunny Lane, Manuel Ferrara - Big Wet Asses 13**; Holly Wellin, Jenner - Anal Full Nelson 5; Belladonna, Steve Holmes - Butthole Whores 2; Marie Luv, Prince Yahshua - Black Ass Addiction 3; Bobbi Starr, Sascha - Diggin' in the Gapes; Jandi Lin, Manuel Ferrara - Evil Anal 5; Mia Rose, Travis Knight - Flesh Hunter 10; Rebeca Linares, Marco Banderas - Fuck Me: Rebeca Linares; Hillary Scott, Mick Blue - Icon; Jenny Hendrix, Manuel Ferrara - The Jenny Hendrix Anal Experience; Katsuni, Marco Banderas - Katsuni Minx; Missy Stone, Christian - Missy-Behavin'; Teagan Presley, Mr. Pete - Oil Overload; Briana Banks, Manuel Ferrara - Perfect Match; Eva Angelina, Tom Byron - Se7en Deadly Sins | **Annette Schwarz - Face Fucking Inc. 3**; Jessica Drake - Bad Girls; Belladonna - Belladonna's Odd Jobs 3; Renae Cruz - Blow Me Sandwich 12; Sasha Grey - Filth Comes First 3; Dana DeArmond - Gangbang My Face 3; Crissy Moon - The Gauntlet 3; Faye Reagan (as Faye Valentine) - The Gauntlet 3; Tiffany Mynx - Glory Hole; Ann Marie Rios - Head Case 4; Jennifer Dark - Kink; Claire Dames, Samantha Sin, Nikki Rhodes, Kylee Reese - Night of the Giving Head; Gianna Michaels - Praise the Load; Lindsey Meadows - Tristan Taormino's Expert Guide to Oral Sex 2: Fellatio |

=== Additional Award Winners ===
These awards were announced in a winners-only segment following the main portion of the event and were not part of the televised awards show:

- Best Adult Website: Brazzers.com
- Best All-Girl Group Sex Scene: Jesse Jane, Shay Jordan, Stoya, Adrianna Lynn, Brianna Love, Lexxi Tyler, Memphis Monroe, Sophia Santi, Priya Rai, Cheerleaders
- Best All-Girl Release: Girlvana 4
- Best All-Girl Series: Women Seeking Women
- Best All-Girl 3-Way Sex Scene: Belladonna, Aiden Starr, Kimberly Kane, Belladonna's Girl Train
- Best All-Sex Release: Alexis Texas is Buttwoman
- Best Alternative Release: Spring Break 2008
- Best Amateur Release: ATK Exotics 2
- Best Amateur Series: Cherries
- Best Anal Themed Release: Weapons of Ass Destruction 6
- Best Anal-Themed Series: (Tie) Evil Anal and Butthole Whores
- Best Animated Release: Night When Evil Falls, Vol. 1
- Best Art Direction: Pirates II: Stagnetti's Revenge
- Best BD/SM Release: House of Sex and Domination
- Best Big Bust Release: Big Tits at School
- Best Big Bust Series: Big Wet Tits
- Best Big Butt Release: Big Wet Asses 13
- Best Big Butt Series: Big Wet Asses
- Best Cinematography: Andrew Blake, Paid Companions
- Best Classic Release: Zazel: The Scent of Love
- Best Continuing Series: Ashlynn Goes to College
- Best Director–Ethnic Video: Jules Jordan, Lex the Impaler 3
- Best Director–Foreign Feature: Juan Carlos, Jesus Villaobos, Jason Colt: Mystery of the Sexy Diamonds
- Best Director–Foreign Non-Feature: Christoph Clark, Nasty Intentions 2
- Best Director–Non-Feature: Eli Cross, Icon
- Best Double Penetration Sex Scene: Jessica Drake, Eric Masterson, Brad Armstrong, Fallen
- Best DVD Extras: Pirates II: Stagnetti's Revenge
- Best DVD Menus: Fallen
- Best Editing: Joey Pulgades, Pirates II: Stagnetti's Revenge
- Best Educational Release: Tristan Taormino's Expert Guide to Oral Sex 2: Fellatio
- Best Ethnic-Themed Release–Asian: Asia Noir 6: Evil Sex Trap
- Best Ethnic-Themed Release–Black: Black Ass Addiction 2
- Best Ethnic-Themed Release–Latin: Mami Culo Grande 6
- Best Ethnic-Themed Series–Asian: Naughty Little Asians
- Best Ethnic-Themed Series–Black: Black Ass Addiction
- Best Ethnic-Themed Series–Latin: Young Tight Latinas
- Best Fem-Dom Strap On Release: Mean Bitches Erotic Femdom 3
- Best Foot/Leg Fetish Release: Belladonna's Foot Soldiers
- Best Foreign All-Sex Release: Rocco: Animal Trainer 25
- Best Foreign All-Sex Series: Ass Traffic
- Best Foreign Feature: Jason Colt: Mystery of the Sexy Diamonds
- Best Gonzo Series: Slutty and Sluttier
- Best Group Sex Scene: Hillary Scott, Heidi Mayne, Mark Davis, Alec Knight, Cheyne Collins, Alex Sanders, Icon
- Best High-Definition Production: Pirates II: Stagnetti's Revenge
- Best High-End All Sex Release: Icon
- Best Internal Release: All Internal 7
- Best Internal Series: Ass Cream Pies
- Best Interracial Series: It's Big, It's Black, It's Jack
- Best Makeup: Pirates II: Stagnetti's Revenge
- Best Male Newcomer: Anthony Rosano
- Best MILF Release: The Cougar Club
- Best MILF Series: Seasoned Players
- Best Music Soundtrack: The Bad Luck Betties
- Best New Line: Spearmint Rhino Films
- Best New Series: Ashlynn Goes to College
- Best New Video Production Company: Brazzers
- Best New Web Starlet: Bree Olson
- Best Non-Sex Performance: Nina Hartley, Not Bewitched XXX
- Best Online Marketing Campaign–Company Image: EvilAngel.com
- Best Online Marketing Campaign–Individual Project: RollerDollzXXX.com, Adam & Eve/Zero Tolerance Entertainment
- Best Oral-Themed Release: Blow Job Perversion
- Best Oral-Themed Series: Face Fucking, Inc.
- Best Orgy/Gang Bang Release: Big Boob Orgy
- Best Orgy/Gang Bang Series: Cream Pie Orgy
- Best Original Song: “Please,” Ethan Kane and Posse, Dark City
- Best Overall Marketing Campaign–Company Image: Digital Playground
- Best Overall Marketing Campaign–Individual Project: Pirates II: Stagnetti's Revenge
- Best Packaging: Fallen, Wicked Pictures
- Best Packaging Innovation: Burn, Vivid Entertainment
- Best POV Release: Jack's POV 9
- Best POV Series: Double Vision
- Best POV Sex Scene: Tory Lane, Katja Kassin, Erik Everhard, Double Vision 2
- Best Pro-Am Release: First Time Auditions 5
- Best Pro-Am Series: Bang Bus
- Best Retail Website: AdamEve.com
- Best Screenplay: Joone, Max Massimo, Pirates II: Stagnetti's Revenge
- Best Sex Scene In A Foreign-Shot Production: Bonny Bon, Anthony Hardwood, Mugar, Nick Lang, Frank Gun, Lauro Gotto, Ass Traffic 3
- Best Solo Release: All By Myself 3
- Best Solo Sex Scene: Teagan Presley, Not Bewitched XXX
- Best Spanking Release: Credit Card Fraud
- Best Special Effects: Pirates II: Stagnetti's Revenge
- Best Specialty Release–Other Genre: Milk Nymphos 2
- Best Specialty Series: Taboo
- Best Squirting Release: Jada Fire is Squirtwoman 3
- Best Squirting Series: Jada Fire Is Squirtwoman
- Best Supporting Actor: Ben English, Pirates II: Stagnetti's Revenge
- Best Supporting Actress: Belladonna, Pirates II: Stagnetti's Revenge
- Best Tease Performance: Jenna Haze, Pretty as They Cum
- Best Threeway Sex Scene: Jenny Hendrix, Delilah Strong & Michael Stefano, The Jenny Hendrix Anal Experience
- Best Transsexual Release: America's Next Top Tranny 2
- Best Transsexual Series: Transsexual Babysitters
- Best Videography: Joone, Oliver Henry, Pirates II: Stagnetti's Revenge
- Best Vignette Release: Cheerleaders
- Best Vignette Series: Cheating Wives Tales
- Best Young Girl Release: Jailbait 5
- Best Young Girl Series: It's a Daddy Thing
- Clever Title Of The Year: Strollin in the Colon, Hustler Video
- Director Of The Year: Brad Armstrong
- Female Foreign Performer Of The Year: Eve Angel
- The Jenna Jameson Crossover Star Of The Year: Katie Morgan
- Male Foreign Performer Of The Year: Rocco Siffredi
- MILF/Cougar Performer Of The Year: Lisa Ann
- Most Outrageous Sex Scene: “When There's No More Room at the Kandy Kat, the Dead Souls Will Blow You at Home,” Caroline Pierce, Christian, Rucca Page, Nikki Rhodes, Emma Cummings, Annie Cruz, Kaci Starr, Rebecca Lane, Kiwi Ling and numerous other Zombie Girls, Night of the Giving Head
- Transsexual Performer Of The Year: Wendy Williams
- Unsung Male Performer Of The Year: Charles Dera
- Unsung Starlet Of The Year: Amber Rayne

== Honorary AVN Awards ==
=== Reuben Sturman Award ===
- None given this year

=== Hall of Fame ===
AVN Hall of Fame inductees for 2009 were: Lisa Ann, Briana Banks, Jewel De'Nyle, Guy DiSilva, Wesley Emerson, Tim Lake, Mr. Marcus, Midori, Tera Patrick, Carter Stevens, Lexington Steele and Luc Wylder

- Founders Branch: Frank & Michael K., founders of IVD; Steven Toushin, founder of Bijou Video; Howie Klein & Al Bloom, founders of Caballero Home Video
- Internet Founders: Greg Clayman & Chuck Tsiamis, founders of Video Secrets; Andrew Conru, founder of Adult FriendFinder; Al Hadhazy, founder of iFriends and Amateur Hardcore; Ron Levi, founder of Cybererotica and CECash; David Van der Poel & Toine Rodenberg, founders of Python

=== Films with multiple nominations and awards ===
The following releases received the most nominations.

| Nominations | Film |
|---|---|
| 30 | Pirates II: Stagnetti's Revenge |

The following six films received the most awards:

| Awards | Film |
|---|---|
| 15 | Pirates II: Stagnetti's Revenge |
| 4 | Fallen |
| 4 | Cheerleaders |
| 3 | Icon |
| 3 | Not Bewitched XXX |
| 3 | Big Wet Asses 13 |

The following individuals received multiple awards:

- 3 awards: Belladonna, Joone
- 2 awards: Lisa Ann, Brad Armstrong, Jessica Drake, Jenna Haze, Jesse Jane, Mr. Marcus, Stoya

== Presenters and performers ==
The following individuals presented awards or performed musical numbers.

=== Presenters ===
| Name(s) | Role |
|---|---|
| Katie Morgan; Kaylani Lei; Nick Manning | Presenters of the awards for Best Interactive DVD and Best Oral Sex Scene |
| Penny Flame; Tera Patrick | Presenters of the awards for Best Girl-Girl Sex Scene and Best Film |
| Brooke Haven; Lisa Ann; Jesse Jane | Presenters of the awards for Best Actor and Best Gonzo Release |
| Savanna Samson; Kayden Kross; Bubba the Love Sponge | Presenters of the awards for Best Anal Sex Scene and Best Sex Comedy |
| Randy Spears | Introducer of the "Pirates II" comedy segment |
| Sasha Grey; Katsuni; Mikayla Mendez | Presenters of the awards for Male Performer of the Year and Best Interracial Release |
| Justine Joli; Tommy Gunn; Kirsten Price | Presenters of the awards for Web Starlet of the Year and Best Couples Sex Scene |
| Thea Vidale | Introducer of the trophy girls—Sadie West and Angelina Armani |
| Bree Olson | Presenter of the AVN Award for Best New Starlet |
| Paul Fishbein; Michelle Maylene | In memoriam for people in the industry who died; Announcement of awards for Top Renting and Top Selling Release |
| Tom Byron; Meggan Mallone | Presenters of the awards for Best Actress and Best Director—Feature |
| Priya Rai; Monique Dayne; Rico Strong | Presenters of the AVN Award for Female Performer of the Year |
| Alexis Texas; Ann Marie Rios; Pinky | Presenters of the award for Best Video Feature |

=== Performers ===
| Name(s) | Role | Performed |
|---|---|---|
| Mark Stone and the AVN Orchestra | Musical Director/Producer | Orchestral |
| Flo Rida; Spearmint Rhino Dancers | Performers | Opening musical number, “Low” |
| Thea Vidale | Performer | Opening comedy segment |
| Evan Stone; Tommy Gunn | Performers | “Pirates II” comedy segment |
| Voodoo | Performers | “Cock Wow” comedy segment |
| Jazmine Katrina; The Fashionistas Dancers | Performers | “Star-Spangled Banner” |
| Larry Flynt | Speaker | Positive message to the industry |

== Ceremony Information ==
Although not scheduled to perform, rappers T-Pain and Flavor Flav jumped on stage to be part of the show during Flo Rida's performance of his hit song "Low" to open the show.

Among new categories for 2009, AVN recognized three web categories: Adult Site of the Year, Web Starlet of the Year, and Best New Web Starlet. Reviewers from TheBestPorn.com and RabbitsReviews.com and AVN Online staff made up the nominating committee. Also new was the Internet branch of the AVN hall of fame, which added five members.

=== Performance of year's movies ===
Cheerleaders was announced as the top selling and top renting movie of the previous year.

== In Memoriam ==
AVN president Paul Fishbein gave a memorial tribute to 10 stalwarts of the adult industry who died in 2008. He dedicated the show to one of them, producer Dick Miller, a close friend of his.

== See also ==
- AVN Award
- AVN Award for Male Performer of the Year
- AVN Female Performer of the Year Award
- List of members of the AVN Hall of Fame
- AVN Award for Male Foreign Performer of the Year
- 2009 GayVN Awards
