= Devon (actress) =

American pornographic film actress

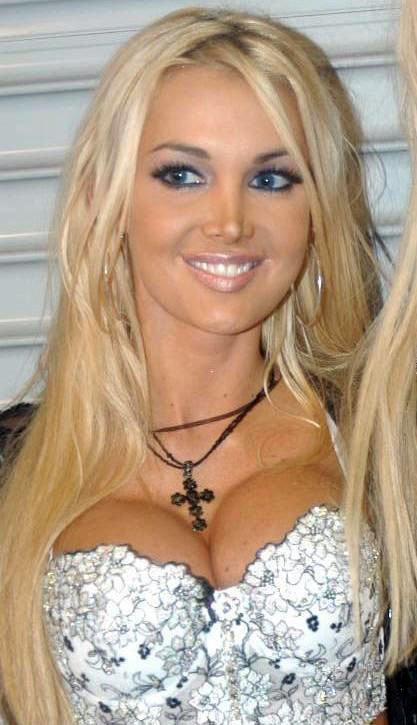
- Devon in 2005
- Occupation: Pornographic film actress
- Years active: 1998–present
- Awards: Penthouse Pet of the Month (January 2001); AVN Hall of Fame (2010)

Devon is an American pornographic film actress. She was a Penthouse Pet in 2001 and in 2005 co-starred in the pornographic action-adventure film Pirates, which cost over US$ 1 million to make and was described by its producer as the most expensive pornographic film in history.

She has worked for Digital Playground and Shane's World, appearing in films for them and also directing for the latter. She has won a number of awards for her performances and was inducted into the AVN Hall of Fame in 2010.

== Career ==
=== Pornographic films ===
Devon's first foray into the mainstream adult film industry came in 1998, when she appeared in the Jules Jordan film New Breed. She was the Penthouse Pet of the Month in January 2001. She worked for Vivid Entertainment for three years (1998–2001). Her first release for Vivid was Country Comfort. After her Vivid contract, she signed with Digital Playground.

In 2004, Devon appeared in the first WMV-HD DVD porn movie ever made, Island Fever 3, filmed on Tahiti and Bora Bora. In 2005, she co-starred in the adult film Pirates. By January 2006, she had signed with Ecstasy Mobile. In March 2006, she signed with Black Kat Productions, which never produced any films with her.

In 2006, Devon formed her own production company. In October 2006, she signed a contract with Shane's World to appear in films and direct film scenes for the company. She made her directorial debut for Shane's World in April 2007 with Devon Does Baja. She says she is personally most proud of Virtual Sex with Devon (2001), saying she spent more time filming it than most other titles in which she appeared.

In 2010, she was inducted into the AVN Hall of Fame.

=== Mainstream appearances ===
Devon appeared in the episode "Millennium" (Season 1, Episode 19) of The Man Show in 1999. She appeared with fellow Digital Playground contract performers Jesse Jane and Teagan Presley in an episode of HBO's Entourage, "I Love You Too", which aired July 31, 2005.

== Personal life ==
Devon is a native of Allentown, Pennsylvania. Prior to 2005, Devon dated Danny Ting, co-founder of WantedList, a pornographic DVD subscription site that sought to be the "Netflix of the porn industry". She suffers from mild acrophobia. She believes being active in the sex industry has given her more confidence, making her more "outgoing and aggressive" about what she wants. In 2022, she was diagnosed with colon cancer.

== Awards and nominations ==
Year	Ceremony	Result	Category	Work
2000	AVN Award	Nominated	Best Tease Performance	Extreme Close-Up 4
2000	AVN Award	Nominated	Best All-Girl Sex Scene, Film (with Maya Divine & Devinn Lane)	Three
2000	XRCO Award	Nominated	Starlet of the Year	—N/a
2002	Venus Award	Nominated	Best Actress (USA)	—N/a
2003	NightMoves Award	Won	Best Actress (Fan Choice)	—N/a
2010	AVN Award	Nominated	Best All-Girl Group Sex Scene (with Jenaveve Jolie, Melissa Lauren, Shawna Leneé & Mya Nichole)	Babes Illustrated 18
2010	AVN Award	Won	AVN Hall of Fame	—N/a
2013	XRCO Award	Nominated	Best Cumback	—N/a
