= Pirates 2 =

Pirates 2 can refer to:

- Pirates of the Caribbean: Dead Man's Chest, a 2006 film
- Pirates II: Stagnetti's Revenge, a 2008 pornographic film
- Pirates II, an album by Visions of Atlantis
