= Janine Lindemulder =

American pornographic film actress (born 1969)

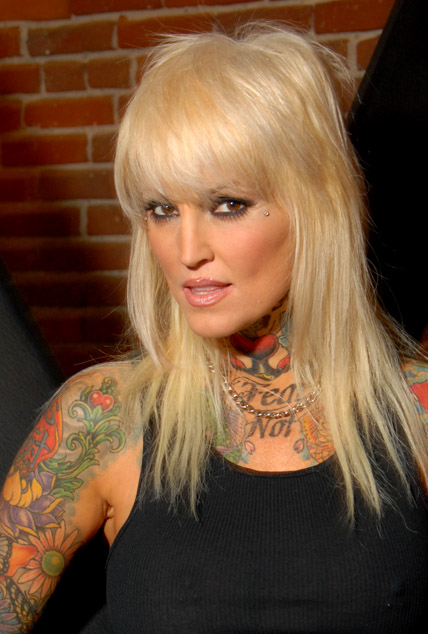
- Lindemulder in 2010
- Born: 1969 (age 56–57)
- Occupation: Pornographic film actress
- Years active: 1988–1999; 2004–2011
- Spouse: Jesse James (m. 2002; div. 2004)
- Children: 2

Janine Lindemulder (born 1969) is an American pornographic film actress, often credited mononymously as Janine. She is a member of the AVN Hall of Fame and the XRCO Hall of Fame. In 1999, she was pictured on the album artwork for punk rock band Blink-182's third studio album, Enema of the State.

== Early career ==
After graduating from high school in 1986, Lindemulder worked as a stripper. She answered an ad looking for a figure model, not knowing "figure model" meant nude model. After meeting with the photographer who posted the ad, he asked her to do a spread for Penthouse, a men's magazine. Lindemulder made her first appearance in the December 1987 issue, as the Pet of the Month. She appeared several more times in Penthouse over the next ten years as well as other men's magazines such as Gallery and Hustler, and was chosen as Pet of the Year Runner-Up for 1990.

== Career ==
=== Adult film career ===
Lindemulder came to prominence performing in lesbian pornography for film distributor Vivid Video in the 1990s. Together with fellow adult film performer Julia Ann, Lindemulder also formed the exotic dancing duo Blondage who headlined several videos for Vivid. Blondage was featured in an early issue of the Carnal Comics comic book title True Stories of Adult Film Stars, which included a story written by Lindemulder.

=== Modeling and acting ===
In 1997, Lindemulder played the wife of a camp director in the Howard Stern film Private Parts. She also appeared on Stern's television and radio shows as a featured guest. Lindemulder was the cover model for Blink-182's 1999 album Enema of the State, and appeared in their videos for the songs "What's My Age Again?" and "Man Overboard" as a nurse.

=== Retirement and comeback ===
In 1999, Lindemulder announced that she was leaving the adult film industry to pursue a career as a kindergarten teacher. She added that another reason she was retiring was to focus more on raising her son. She was inducted into the AVN Hall of Fame in 2002, and her retirement lasted until April 2004, when she announced that she would be making a comeback – for the first time performing with men. She signed with her former company, Vivid Video, and starred in eight new films. Her first film scene with a male was with Nick Manning in Maneater. After her comeback deal with Vivid expired, Lindemulder signed with Vivid rival Digital Playground and starred in a handful of features for them, including Pirates in 2005.

In January 2006 she won two AVN Awards. Her April 2007 film Janine Loves Jenna co-stars Jenna Jameson.

Lindemulder appeared in front of a camera for the first time in five years in the 2017 documentary After Porn Ends 2, covering her rise to fame, her Blondage act, her mental unpreparedness for the realities of being famous and the post-effects of her custody battle for her daughter with television personality Jesse James.

Lindemulder has an OnlyFans account, which she started in 2017.

== Personal life ==
Lindemulder appeared in a sex tape with her then-boyfriend Mötley Crüe lead singer Vince Neil, and former Penthouse model Brandy Ledford. Lindemulder was married to West Coast Choppers founder Jesse James from 2002 until the couple divorced in 2004.

=== Legal issues and custody battle ===
In August 2008, Lindemulder pleaded guilty to federal misdemeanor charges of willful failure to pay federal income taxes. She had failed to pay nearly $300,000 in back taxes. She had made a down payment on a $647,000 house and bought two new vehicles – despite being aware of her tax debt obligations. She faced up to one year in prison, and a $100,000 fine.

In December 2008, Lindemulder began serving a six-month federal prison sentence for tax evasion. The judge also ordered that she live in a residential community corrections center for up to six months after her release from prison, that she complete one year of supervised release, and that she repay the federal government $294,000 in back taxes.

During Lindemulder's incarceration, Jesse James was awarded custody of their daughter. Upon Lindemulder's release, James and Lindemulder engaged in a custody battle over their daughter. Lindemulder had weekly visitation rights limited to daytime hours. Her request for expanded visitation rights was denied by an Orange County family court.

== Awards ==
- 1994 XRCO Award - Best Girl-Girl Scene (Hidden Obsessions) with Julia Ann
- 1994 AVN Award - Best All-Girl Sex Scene, Film (Hidden Obsessions) with Julia Ann
- 1997 AVN Award - Best Tease Performance (Extreme Close-Up)
- 2000 AVN Award - Best All-Girl Sex Scene, Film (Seven Deadly Sins) with Julia Ann
- 2000 AVN Award - Best Supporting Actress, Film (Seven Deadly Sins)
- 2001 Exotic Dancer Hall of Fame
- 2002 AVN Hall of Fame inductee
- 2006 AVN Award - Best All-Girl Sex Scene (Pirates) with Jesse Jane
- 2006 AVN Award - Best Actress, Video (Pirates)
- 2006 XRCO Award - MILF of the Year
- 2006 XRCO Hall of Fame inductee
- 2007 AVN Award - Best Sex Scene Coupling, Film (Emperor) with Manuel Ferrara
- 2015 Inked Hall of Fame inductee
