= Carmen Luvana =

Former Puerto Rican pornographic actress

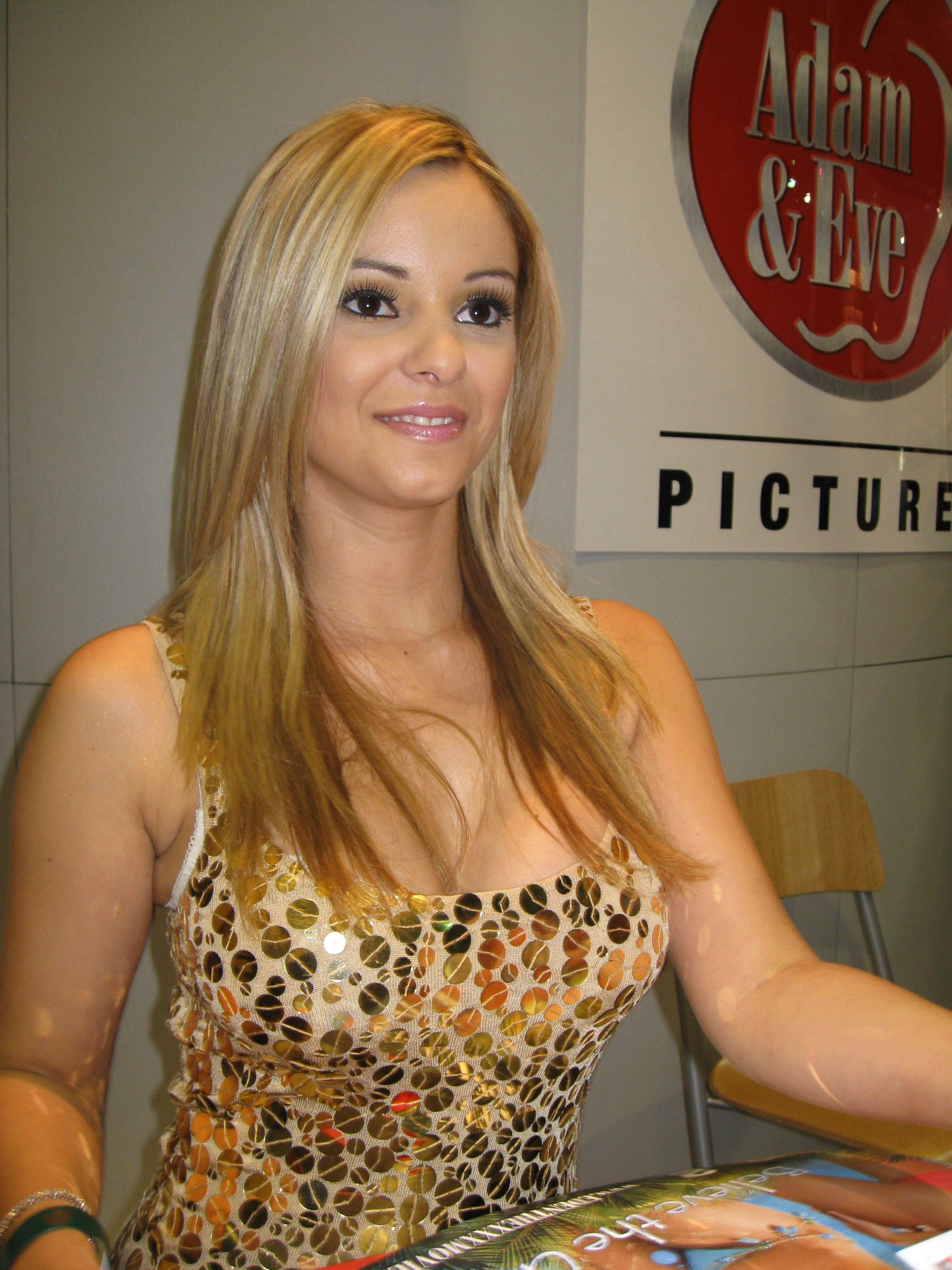
- Luvana at AVN Adult Entertainment Expo 2008
- Born: Michelle Sandoval; August 23, 1981 (age 45); Brooklyn, New York, U.S.
- Occupations: Model; former pornographic actress; host
- Years active: 2001–2008 (pornography); 2022–present (film and theatre)
- Height: 5 ft 1 in (155 cm)
- Partner: Joshua Reyes
- Children: 2

Michelle Sandoval (born 23 August 1981), better known by her stage name, Carmen Luvana, is a Puerto Rican film and theatre actress and retired pornographic actress.

== Early life ==
Michelle Sandoval was born on August 23, 1981, in Brooklyn, New York, Her family moved to Puerto Rico when she was five, where she was largely raised by her grandmother due to the absence of her parents. She moved to Miami, Florida at the age of 18 and got her start as a dancer in Miami strip clubs.

== Career ==
Luvana entered the adult film industry in 2001 at the age of 19. Her first hardcore appearance was in More Dirty Debutantes #211. She was initially a contract girl with Digital Sin/New Sensations. Among her films was the 2005 film, Pirates, which was the most expensive pornographic film made to that date, and the 2006 pornographic parody film, Lady Scarface: The World Is Hers, based on the 1983 film Scarface, with Luvana playing a gender-flipped version of the character played by Al Pacino in the original.

Luvana did not do anal sex on camera initially, saying that she would not do anything she was not comfortable with. After doing it in her private life and finding that she liked it, she proceeded to do it on film.

In December 2007, Luvana announced that 2008 would be her last year performing in adult films, saying that after six years in the industry "I do not want to be known [as] the girl [fans] are tired of seeing and that has been in the industry way too long".

In 2022, Luvana had her first major appearance in a mainstream film, starring in Los Foodtruckeros (The Foodtruckers), directed by Eduardo Ortíz and also starring Junior Álvarez, Carmen Nydia Velázquez, and Carlos Vega. In March 2023, Luvana made her debut as a stage actress, starring in the comic play, "¿Pa' Qué me Casé?" ("Why the hell did I get married"), by Héctor Méndez. The play debuted at the Tapia Theater in Old San Juan on 10 March 2023, and thereafter played on 24 and 25 March at the Yagüez Theater in Mayagüez, before beginning a tour of southern Puerto Rico. Luvana indicated that she sought to distance herself from her career in pornography and empower women with a demonstration of their ability to move beyond their past.

In October 2025, Luvana announced her engagement to Joshua Pauta, her boyfriend of five years and co-star in "¿Pa' Qué me Casé?".

== Awards ==
- 2003 XRCO Award – Starlet of the Year
- 2003 Adam Film World Guide Award – Best New Starlet
- 2003 NightMoves Award – Best New Starlet (Fan's Choice)
- 2004 XRCO Award – Best Girl-Girl Scene (with Jenna Jameson)
- 2004 KSEXradio Listener's Choice Award – Hottest Porn Jockey Naked
- 2005 NightMoves Award – Best Actress (Fan's Choice)
- 2006 F.A.M.E. Award – Favorite Oral Starlet
- 2008 NightMoves Hall of Fame
