= Joone (director) =

American pornographic film director and producer

- Born: Ali Joone c. 1969 (age 56–57); Beverly Hills, California, U.S.
- Education: University of California Los Angeles
- Occupations: Photographer, director & producer
- Years active: 1998–2008 (porn director)
- Organization(s): Digital Playground; Diosa Spirits
- Spouse: Samantha Lewis (divorced)

Joone is an American entrepreneur, photographer, director and producer of porn. He has won two AVN Awards for directing pornographic films. In 1993, Joone founded American pornographic movie studio Digital Playground and was a co-owner of the company until it was acquired by Manwin in 2012.

== Career ==
He founded the Digital Playground company in 1993 when he was 25 and still a student, initially making adult CD-ROM computer games.

Commenting on the transition of the pornography industry from the underground economy to mainstream corporate acceptance, the company's founder said: "I look at the porn business where Vegas and gambling was in the 70's… Vegas was still mob-owned and they were making the transition between these small groups of people to being corporate owned… I feel the same exact thing is going to happen with adult".

Joone has directed the pornographic films Pirates and Pirates II: Stagnetti's Revenge.

In January 2012, alongside his ex-wife Samantha Lewis—who was co-owner, CEO and President of Digital Playground—he reached an agreement with Fabian Thylmann to sell the company to Manwin. On the acquisition, Joone commented: "To me this deal is no different than the acquisition of Pixar by Disney, The consumer is going to see more blockbusters, big-budget productions, and it's our goal to create the next genre of adult entertainment. This acquisition is a marriage between two industry leaders. Adult entertainment is changing and Manwin has a lead on technology." The price or terms of the deal was not disclosed, but it was announced that Lewis and Joone will "continue to oversee the studio"; however, it was reported in March that Manwin had released Lewis and some other employees.

=== Other ventures ===
Joone is co-owner of "Diosa Spirits" tequila, with Jesse Jane and her husband Rich.

== Partial filmography ==
=== As director ===
- Pirates
- Pirates II: Stagnetti's Revenge
- Island Fever 1, 2, 3 & 4
- Forbidden Tales
- Virtual Sex line of DVDs:
  - Virtual Sex with Jesse Jane
  - Virtual Sex with Taylor Hayes
  - Virtual Sex with Tera Patrick
  - Virtual Sex with Jenna Jameson
- Rocki Roads' Wet Dreams

== Awards and nominations ==
- 2006 AVN Award – Best Director, Video (Pirates)
- 2006 XRCO Award winner - Best Director
- 2009 AVN Award winner – Best Director, Feature (Pirates II)
- 2009 AVN Award winner – Best Screenplay (Pirates II) shared with Max Massimo
- 2009 AVN Award winner – Best Videography (Pirates II) shared with Oliver Henry
- 2009 Eroticline Awards winner - Best U.S. Director
- 2009 Hot d'Or Award winner - Best American Screenplay (Pirates II: Stagnetti's Revenge - Digital Playground)
- 2009 Hot d'Or Award winner - Best American Movie (Pirates II: Stagnetti's Revenge - Digital Playground)
