= Pirates (2005 film) =

2005 US pornographic action-adventure film

- HD DVD cover
- Directed by: Joone
- Written by: Josey Short (story); Max Massimo (screenplay)
- Produced by: Joone; Samantha Lewis
- Starring: Jesse Jane; Carmen Luvana; Janine; Teagan Presley; Devon; Jenaveve Jolie; Evan Stone
- Cinematography: Joone
- Edited by: Joey Pulgadas
- Music by: Mr. Anderson; Steven Berlin; Christopher Hart
- Production company: Adam & Eve
- Distributed by: Digital Playground
- Release date: September 26, 2005
- Running time: 129 minutes
- Country: United States
- Language: English
- Budget: ~$1 million

Pirates is a 2005 pornographic American action-adventure film written, produced, and directed by Joone, and produced by Digital Playground and Adam & Eve. The film, starring Jesse Jane, Carmen Luvana, Janine Lindemulder, Devon, Jenaveve Jolie, Teagan Presley, and Evan Stone, features many references to the mainstream Hollywood film Pirates of the Caribbean: The Curse of the Black Pearl.

Producer Samantha Lewis stated in an interview that Pirates was the most expensive pornographic film made to date, with a reported budget of well over $1 million.

A sequel, Pirates II: Stagnetti's Revenge, was made on an even bigger budget of $8 million, and it is considered the most expensive porn film ever produced.

Pirates was initially banned in Australia due to violent scenes, despite that they do not involve sex.

== Plot ==
In 1763, Captain Edward Reynolds is hunting pirates, or at least trying to do so. He does not consider himself a great commander, and neither does most of his crew. Only his first officer Jules believes in him. When they save a young woman named Isabella from drowning, she tells them that her husband's ship has been destroyed by the feared Captain Victor Stagnetti and his crew of cutthroat pirates.

Reynolds and his crew go hunting for Stagnetti, who tries to find a map that leads to a powerful secret on an island somewhere in the Caribbean Sea. Stagnetti finds the secret "staff" unlocked by Isabella's husband Manuel.

After the crew escapes the spawn of darkness summoned by Stagnetti, their ship engages Stagnetti's in battle, ending Stagnetti's reign as a pirate.

== Cast ==
- Jesse Jane as Jules
- Carmen Luvana as Isabella
- Janine Lindemulder as Serena
- Devon as Madelyn
- Teagan Presley as Christina
- Evan Stone as Captain Edward Reynolds
- Tommy Gunn as Captain Eric Victor Stagnetti
- Austyn Moore as Angelina
- Jenaveve Jolie as Pirate Dancer
- Matthew Stirling as Marco
- Kris Slater as Manuel Venezuela
- Matthew McBride as Wu Cho
- Steven J. Zmed as Count Erasanus Von Erectus
- Charmane Star as Wench #1
- Trina Michaels as Wench #2
- Austin Kincaid as Wench #3
- Jolie Harris as Wench #4

== Production ==
The production was shot using high-definition digital video cameras and featured over 300 special effects shots. It also included an original music score, later released on a separate soundtrack CD, and was mastered in Dolby Digital 5.1 surround sound. Several scenes were shot on board Bounty II, a replica of HMS Bounty, in St. Petersburg, Florida. The owners of the ship were not aware of the true nature of the film, as they were advised that the film being made was a "Disney-type pirate film for families", a mistaken notion that would continue in video stores after its release.

The film was initially released as a three-disc DVD set (the movie on a standard video DVD, the movie again in a high definition (720P) Windows Media format, and a special features disc) priced as high as $70. An edited R-rated version of the film was released on DVD on July 11, 2006. Digital Playground also released an Original Motion Picture Soundtrack CD, a rarity among adult video releases.

The film was also released on Blu-ray Disc (containing only the X-rated version) and HD DVD as one of the first high-definition adult releases on an optical disc format.

== Sequel ==
Evan Stone reported on the extra DVD that there was going to be a sequel. In January 2007, it was reported that a sequel would be produced, directed by Joone and entitled Pirates II. A first teaser trailer was presented during the 2007 AVN Adult Entertainment Expo in Las Vegas, Nevada.

In March 2008, Digital Playground announced that the sequel would star Belladonna along with Jesse Jane, Evan Stone and many other performers from the first movie, and that it would be released in September 2008. The second movie was released on September 26, 2008, under the title Pirates II: Stagnetti's Revenge.

== Critical reception ==
RogReviews called it "the most talked about adult movie of the year".

The film set a record by winning 11 AVN Awards (see section below).

The New York Times described the film as "a relatively high-budget story of a group of ragtag sailors who go searching for a crew of evil pirates who have a plan for world domination. Also, many of the characters in the movie have sex with one another."

== Awards ==
- AVN Awards 2006:
  - Best Video Feature
  - Best DVD
  - Best Director – Video (Joone)
  - Best Actress – Video (Janine Lindemulder)
  - Best High-Definition Production
  - Best All-Girl Sex Scene – Video (Janine Lindemulder & Jesse Jane)
  - Best Special Effects
  - Best Actor – Video (Evan Stone)
  - Best Music
  - Best Supporting Actor – Video (Tommy Gunn)
  - Best On-Line Marketing Campaign
- XRCO Awards:
  - Best Release (2006)
  - Epic (2006)
