= The Texas Vibrator Massacre =

- DVD released by Loaded Digital
- Directed by: Rob Rotten
- Written by: Rob Rotten
- Based on: The Texas Chain Saw Massacre by Kim Henkel and Tobe Hooper
- Produced by: Punx Productions
- Starring: Jamie Elle; Bella Lynn; Ruby Knox; Daisy Tanks; Roxy DeVille
- Cinematography: Jim Powers
- Edited by: Hashiell Dammett
- Music by: The Straight 8's
- Production companies: Metro Interactive; Punx Productions
- Distributed by: Loaded Digital
- Release date: April 3, 2008 (MIPTV Media Market)
- Running time: 96 minutes
- Country: United States
- Language: English

The Texas Vibrator Massacre is a 2008 pornographic horror film written and directed by Rob Rotten. It is based on the 1974 film The Texas Chain Saw Massacre.

== Plot ==
While traveling through Texas (in the vicinity of where several bodies have been uncovered) five friends become lost, with their van running low on gas. When one of the group, Christine, goes out to urinate, two of the others pass the time by having sex in the back of the vehicle. After Christine returns, the quintet pick up a hitchhiker in the hope that he can give them directions, but once inside the van the man attacks them with a knife, stabbing two members of the group to death while the others flee. Vanessa reaches a farmhouse, but while searching for aid she is captured by Leatherface, who ties her to a chair, and gags her.

Brent and Christine reach the farmhouse moments later, and are allowed in by the inhabitants, a pair of deranged sisters, one of whom lures Brent into another room. While those two have sex, Christine has a threesome with the remaining sister, Daisy, and the woman's mute brother, Robbie, believing it to be the only way the siblings will offer them any aid. When Brent climaxes, the sister hacks one of his arms off with a hatchet, gnaws on the severed limb, and taunts him as he dies. As that occurs, Christine passes out on the family's couch, and is awakened hours later by Leatherface, who drags her outside. Christine is "raped to death" with a construction vibrator wielded by Leatherface, who licks Christine's blood off the tool with Daisy.

The next day, a sister forces Vanessa to watch as she has sex with Robbie. When the two finish, they and their siblings (including the hitchhiker) and grandfather eat a butchered body in front of Vanessa, and pelt her with viscera. As his family eats, Leatherface takes Vanessa away, intending to kill her with the vibrator, but he is caught off guard when Vanessa flirts with him. Vanessa has sex with Leatherface, distracting him and allowing her to grab a knife, stab him in the leg, and escape.

An unknown amount of time later, the battered Vanessa awakens in a hospital room, where she is interviewed by Detective Mike Roe. As the interview progresses, the detective's questions become disturbing, and he takes nude pictures of Vanessa for "evidentiary purposes" before she falls back unconscious. Vanessa wakes up later, being duct taped to the bed by Daisy, who is dressed like a nurse. Detective Roe appears, and reveals he is the patriarch of the cannibal family, and the father of Leatherface (who he refers to as "Gary"). Vanessa never escaped, the hospital room is just one of the family's sheds. Roe pulls a sheet over Vanessa's head, and he and Daisy beat her to death with a wrench.

== Cast ==
- Roxy DeVille as Vanessa Dawson
- Jamie Elle as Crazy Sister #1
- Daisy Tanks as Daisy
- Rob Rotten as Robbie
- Bella Lynn as Julie
- Ruby Knox as Christine
- Jack Vegas as Mike
- Seth Dickens as Brent
- Eric Swiss as Leatherface
- Kristoff as Hitchhiker
- Dirty Harry as Grandpa
- J-Trap as Dead Body on Table
- Herschel Savage as Detective Mike Roe

== Reception ==
AVN gave The Texas Vibrator Massacre a perfect score of five, writing: "It's weird, but will be a hit with the alt, art and intellectual crowds". A five out of five was also given by XCritic, which found the film to be "a wonderful little homage to one of the greatest horror movies ever made". Horror News.net also responded positively to The Texas Vibrator Massacre, stating "it is filmed well, has an obvious plot, and over all is a decent film". An overall grade of seven out of twelve was awarded by Rog Reviews, which wrote "as a porn horror/gore fest, it's pretty damn good".

The film was banned in United Kingdom after the British Board of Film Classification refused to classify it, due to the film featuring a significant amount of eroticized sexual violence, as well as scenes of intercourse between characters intended to be siblings.
