= Belladonna (actress) =

American pornographic film actress and director (born 1980/1981)

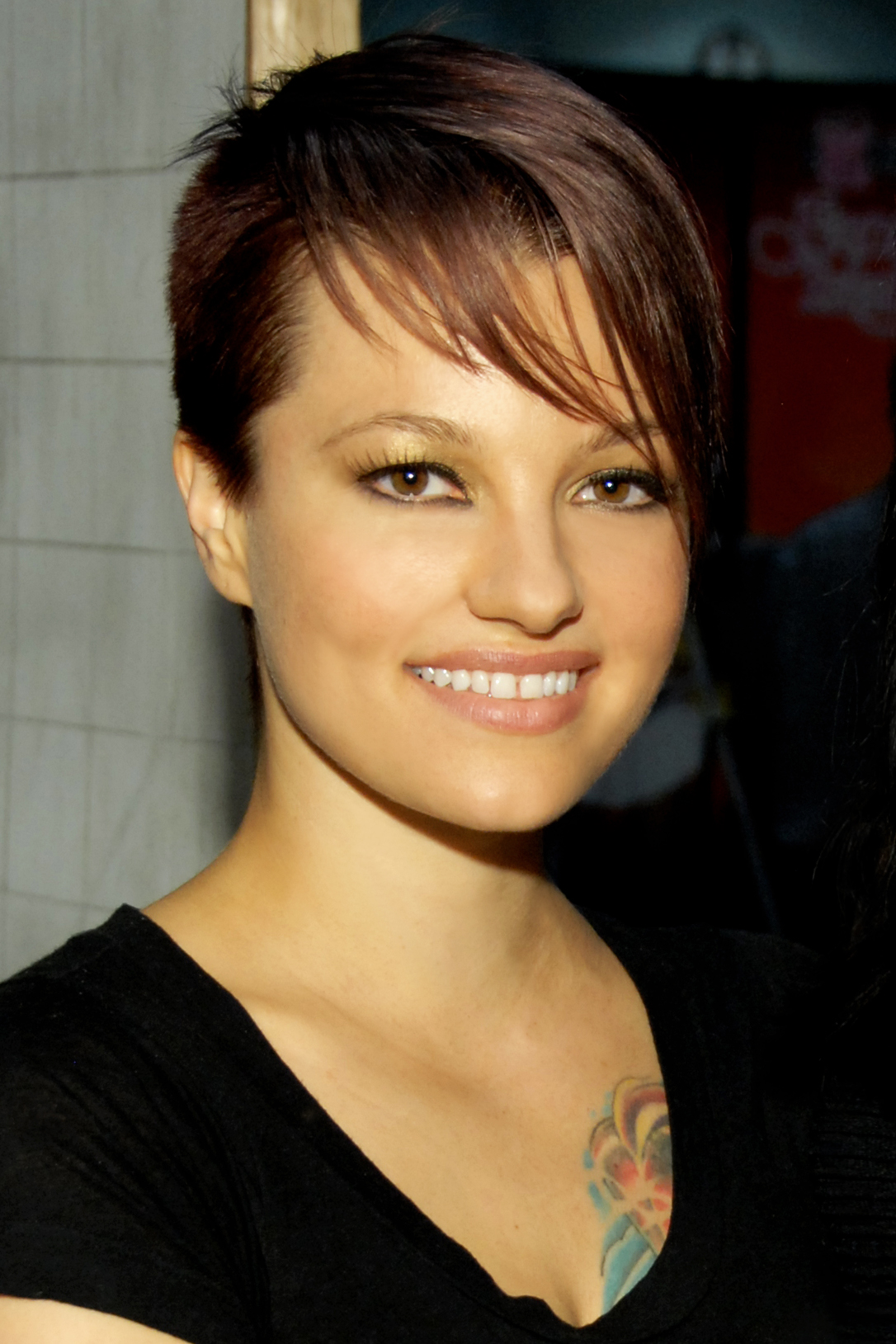
- Belladonna in 2010
- Born: Michelle Sinclair; 1980 or 1981 (age 45–46)
- Other names: Belladonna; Bella
- Occupations: Pornographic actress; actress; director; film producer; model
- Years active: 1999–2012 (pornography); 2012–present (mainstream acting)
- Spouse: Aiden Kelly
- Children: 1

Michelle Sinclair (born 1980 or 1981), known professionally as Belladonna, is an American former pornographic film and erotic actress, director, producer, and model. Since announcing her retirement from pornography in 2012, she has acted in several mainstream films, including Inherent Vice and The Ladies of the House.

== Early life ==
Sinclair grew up as the second of seven children in a Mormon family in Salt Lake City. Her father was a retired Air Force captain and former bishop in the LDS Church.

== Career ==
Sinclair started performing in pornography in Los Angeles at age 18. One of her early films featured a rough group sex scene with her and twelve men, staged in a prison. She has since appeared in over 300 adult films, including titles such as Service Animals 6 & 7, She-Male Domination Nation, Bella Loves Jenna, Back 2 Evil, Weapons of Ass Destruction, and Fashionistas Safado: The Challenge. In 2002 she featured in the multi award-winning BDSM themed Fashionistas; its director John Stagliano described her as "a woman with the most incredible sexual abilities I’ve ever seen." As well as Stagliano she has often been directed by Nacho Vidal, Jules Jordan and Rocco Siffredi.

=== Appearances ===
She has appeared several times in the reality television series Family Business, which focuses on the life of porn director Adam Glasser a.k.a. "Seymore Butts". In 2004 she was one of a number of porn stars photographed by Timothy Greenfield-Sanders for a "coffee table book" on the adult industry, XXX: 30 Porn-Star Portraits; she also appears in the HBO documentary Thinking XXX about the making of the book.

In 2011, she was named by CNBC as one of the 12 most popular stars in porn. CNBC noted that while she had stepped back from acting to pursue directing and producing, she has maintained a loyal fan base, and has been nominated for 42 AVN awards and won 10 in the course of her career.

=== Primetime special ===
Her career in the pornography business was followed for two years by a crew from ABC Television, culminating in a January 2003 interview for ABC's Primetime with Diane Sawyer. In the interview, she broke down in tears while talking about experiencing abuse and depression. The segment led to backlash from other pornography performers but also boosted her career.

=== Retirement and later career ===
In August 2007, Sinclair decided to semi-retire from performing with other people over concerns about sexually transmitted infections, specifically herpes. She thought she had contracted herpes in 2002 and was worried the disease had spread; however, it was later discovered that it was a skin rash rather than herpes.

In 2008, she came out of retirement, and filmed a number of hardcore scenes. She appeared in Digital Playground's Pirates II, the sequel to their top-selling DVD, Pirates. She has also appeared recurringly in James Gunn's PG Porn.

Sinclair was featured on the cover of the second album of British metalcore band Asking Alexandria, titled Reckless & Relentless, released in 2011. She also later featured in their short film Through Sin + Self Destruction.

In July 2012, she announced via Twitter that she was "no longer interested in having sex on camera" and would be pursuing her other interests. In 2014, she made her non-pornographic feature film debut in John Wildman's The Ladies of the House (working title Stripped), a horror film about a group of female cannibals. She appeared in Paul Thomas Anderson's film Inherent Vice as Clancy Charlock in 2014 and in a short film titled Dream Murder Machine in 2018. She also considered becoming a sex positive speaker and instructor.

== Personal life ==
Sinclair's husband Aiden Kelly worked as a website developer for the pornographic film distributor Evil Angel. She gave birth to a daughter in 2005.

== Awards ==
Year	Ceremony	Award	Film
2003	AVN Award	Best Supporting Actress (Film)	The Fashionistas
2003	AVN Award	Best Tease Performance	The Fashionistas
2003	AVN Award	Best All-Girl Sex Scene (Film) (with Taylor St. Claire)	The Fashionistas
2003	AVN Award	Best Oral Sex Scene (Film) (with Rocco Siffredi)	The Fashionistas
2003	XRCO Award	Best Single Performance (Actress)	The Fashionistas
2003	XRCO Award	Best Girl-Girl Sex Scene (with Taylor St. Clair)	The Fashionistas
2003	XRCO Award	Female Performer of the Year	—N/a
2003	XRCO Award	Orgasmic Analist	—N/a
2003	AFWG Award	American Female Performer of the Year	—N/a
2003	AFWG Award	Best Supporting Actress (Film)	The Fashionistas
2003	AFWG Award	Best All-Girl Sex Scene (Film) (with Taylor St. Claire)	The Fashionistas
2003	AFWG Award	Best Anal Sex Scene (Video) (with Lexington Steele)	Up Your Ass 19
2003	FOXE Award	Female Performer of the Year	—N/a
2003	NightMoves Award	Best Actress (Editor's Choice)	—N/a
2003	Ninfa Prize	Best Actress	—N/a
2004	AVN Award	Best Sex Scene Coupling (Video) (with Nacho Vidal)	Back 2 Evil
2004	NightMoves Award	Best Feature Production (Fan's Choice) (with Jenna Jameson)	Bella Loves Jenna
2007	AVN Award	Best Group Sex Scene (Video) (with Melissa Lauren, Jenna Haze, Gianna Michaels, Sandra Romain, Adrianna Nicole, Flower Tucci, Sasha Grey, Nicole Sheridan, Marie Luv, Caroline Pierce, Lia Baren, Jewell Marceau, Jean Val Jean, Christian XXX, Voodoo, Chris Charming, Erik Everhard, Mr. Pete, & Rocco Siffredi)	Fashionistas Safado: The Challenge
2007	FAME Award	Dirtiest Girl in Porn	—N/a
2007	Ninfa Prize	Special Jury Award	—N/a
2007	Ninfa Prize	Most Original Sex Scene	Fashionistas Safado: The Challenge
2008	AVN Award	Best Director (Non-Feature)	Belladonna: Manhandled 2
2008	AFWG Award	Directrix of the Year	Iodine Girl
2008	Urban X Award	Best Interracial Star	—N/a
2008	NightMoves Award	Hall of Fame	—N/a
2008	NightMoves Award	Triple Play Award (Dancing/Performing/Directing)	—N/a
2009	AVN Award	Best All-Girl 3-Way Sex Scene (with Aiden Starr & Kimberly Kane)	Belladonna's Girl Train
2009	AVN Award	Best Supporting Actress	Pirates II: Stagnetti's Revenge
2009	AVN Award	Best All-Girl Couples Sex Scene (with Jesse Jane)	Pirates II: Stagnetti's Revenge
2009	XBIZ Award	Director (Body of Work)	—N/a
2009	XRCO Award	Orgasmic Oralist	—N/a
2009	XRCO Award	Orgasmic Analist	—N/a
2009	FAME Award	Favorite Anal Starlet	—N/a
2009	FAME Award	Favorite Director	—N/a
2010	Fame Registry Award	Social Network Sensation	—N/a
2011	AVN Award	Hall of Fame	—N/a
2012	AVN Award	Best Girl-Girl Sex Scene (with Dana DeArmond)	Belladonna: Sexual Explorer
2012	Hustler	Porn Block of Fame	—N/a
2012	NightMoves Award	Best Director – Non-Parody (Fan's Choice)	—N/a
2013	XRCO Award	Hall of Fame	—N/a
