= Rob Rotten =

American actor and film director (born 1981)

- Born: 1981 (age 44–45); San Francisco, California
- Website: http://www.punxproductions.com/

Rob Rotten is an American actor and film director known for his work on pornographic films, many of which incorporate elements and themes such as punk rock, horror, and gonzo pornography. He retired from the adult entertainment industry in 2014.

== Biography ==
Personal life

Rob Rotten was born in San Francisco, California, USA in 1981. He is married to Rachel Rotten, another adult film actor. The couple starred in films exclusively with each other.

Career

Rotten is the owner and president of Punx Productions, Inc., first created in 2001 and later incorporated in the State of California in 2004. Rotten entered the adult industry in 2001 as a pornographic performer, starring in The Babysitter 12. In 2003, he appeared in and co-directed the pornographic film Little Runaway, which was nominated for five AVN Award's. In 2006, Rotten began directing for the pornography distributor Metro, creating films such as Fuck the System, Porn of the Dead, and The Texas Vibrator Massacre. Rotten remained a Metro contract director until 2012. In addition to movies, Rotten has published a book, titled Bong Load Girls: The Book.

== Awards ==
- 2009 AVN Award nominee – Best Videography – The Texas Vibrator Massacre
- 2009 AVN Award nominee – Best Screenplay – The Texas Vibrator Massacre
- 2009 AVN Award nominee – Best Director, Feature – The Texas Vibrator Massacre
- 2010 AVN Award nominee - Best Vignette Release - "Bong Load Girls (Vol. 1)"
- 2010 AVN Award nominee - Best Soundtrack - "Bong Load Girls (Vol. 1)"
