= Pirates II: Stagnetti's Revenge =

- DVD cover
- Directed by: Joone
- Written by: Joone (story); Max Massimo (screenplay)
- Produced by: Joone
- Starring: Jesse Jane; Belladonna; Evan Stone; Katsuni; Sasha Grey; Stoya
- Cinematography: Joone
- Edited by: Joey Pulgadas
- Music by: John Argosino; Christopher Hart
- Production company: Digital Playground
- Distributed by: Digital Playground; Gelt Ventures
- Release date: September 27, 2008
- Running time: 138 minutes
- Country: United States
- Language: English
- Budget: $8,000,000

Pirates II: Stagnetti's Revenge is a 2008 American pornographic action-adventure film and sequel to the 2005 film Pirates. Produced by Digital Playground, and written and directed by Joone, it stars Jesse Jane, Evan Stone, Steven St. Croix, and Tommy Gunn who reprise their roles from the first film, as well as Belladonna, Sasha Grey, Katsuni, Jenna Haze, and Ben English as new characters. Carmen Luvana, who played the central character of Isabella in the original Pirates, is absent from the sequel.

With a budget of $8 million, it is considered one of the most expensive adult films ever produced. It was released direct-to-DVD and Blu-ray on September 27, 2008. An edited R-rated version of the film is also available.

== Plot ==
Captain Edward Reynolds brags about his victory over the dreaded pirate Victor Stagnetti to his loyal companion Jules; he has even assembled a new crew for his ship, including Ai Chow and Olivia, Serena's cousin. It is Olivia who informs the crew that the governor of Jamaica has ordered Serena's arrest and Olivia is on board to protect the crew from enemies, and to convince Edward and Jules to ask for Serena's pardon. When they finally go to Jamaica and ask Governor Littleton to pardon Serena, he is more interested in Jules' appearance than anything else. They convince the governor, who first sends them on a mission to kill another group of pirates and find another hidden treasure.

Olivia and Jules get off to a rocky start to their friendship, but eventually end up in a steamy lesbian experience. Later, Edward comes across Takvor, the Armenian gold pirate, during a female slave auction and is invited to participate in an orgy featuring belly dancers and slave girls.

Meanwhile, Jules is captured by the Chinese pirate empress Xifeng and is administered a liquid which gives her control over Jules' body and mind. Xifeng uses Jules to seduce and capture Edward. He is then forced to fight a dragon-like creature, but Olivia saves him at the last minute.

Meanwhile, Victor Stagnetti is reborn from the sea. He and Xifeng engage in a three-way with their new thrall, Jules, as she happily obliges. Edward and Olivia fight off a host of undead skeletons Stagnetti summons and more. Olivia boards the enemy ship and fights Xifeng in a sword fight and takes her down. She then must fight the poisoned Jules as well, until Stagnetti intervenes and takes both of them down. Once again, Edward comes to the rescue, reclaiming his title as "the greatest pirate hunter that has ever lived".

== Cast ==
- Jesse Jane as Jules
- Evan Stone as Captain Edward Reynolds
- Belladonna as Olivia
- Sasha Grey as Maria
- Katsuni as Xifeng
- Tommy Gunn as Captain Eric Victor Stagnetti
- Nhan as Wu Chow
- Steven St. Croix as Marco
- Candido Velasco as Dado
- Jenna Haze as Slave Girl Anne
- Ben English as Governor Lyttelton
- Stoya as Belly Dancer
- Gabriella Fox as Belly Dancer
- Charles Velasco as Captain Kupal
- Shyla Stylez as Belly Dancer
- Shawna Lenee as Governor's Girl #1
- Riley Steele as Governor's Girl #2
- Alistair MacDonald as Governor Lyttelton's Servant
- Brea Lynn as Nude Servant Girl
- Abbey Brooks as Nude Servant Girl
- Veronica Rayne as Nude Servant Girl
- Brianna Love as Diva Crew Girl
- Rhylee Richards as Diva Crew Girl
- Marco Banderas as Takvor's Man
- Charles Dera as Takvor's Man
- Manuel Ferrara as Takvor's Man
- James Deen as Crew Member
- Zaaf B. as Captain "Evil Gold" Takvor

== Awards and nominations ==
- 2009 XBIZ Award winner – Movie of the Year
- 2009 Eroticline Awards winner – Best U.S. Film
- 2009 XRCO Award winner – Best actor, Evan Stone
- 2009 XRCO Award winner – Best epic (tie with Fallen by Wicked Pictures)
- 2009 Hot d'Or winner – Katsuni, Best French actress
- 2009 Hot d'Or winner – Jesse Jane, Best American actress
- 2009 Hot d'Or winner – Best American screenplay

== University of Maryland controversy ==
Pirates II became part of a controversy when the University of Maryland, College Park's student union intended to screen the film. After state Senator Andrew P. Harris offered a budget amendment to strip all public funding from any institution airing pornographic films, the university announced that it would cancel the screening. Had the Senator's demand been carried out, the university would have been forced to forfeit $424 million in funds.

The students screened the film anyway on the evening of April 6, 2009, in a lecture hall on campus, after consulting with the Foundation for Individual Rights in Education and a panel discussion on First Amendment rights. The new screening was organized by the Student Power Party; two hundred students, as well as administrators, professors, and numerous media outlets were present for the screening. The film was shown at other colleges including University of California Davis, University of California Los Angeles, and Carnegie-Mellon University without controversy.
