= Jesse Jane =

American pornographic film actress (1980–2024)

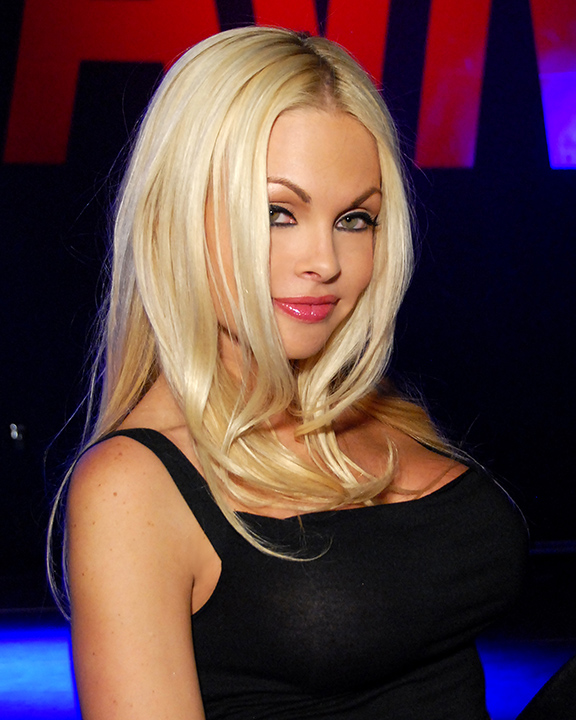
- Jane in 2013
- Born: Cynthia Ann Howell; July 16, 1980; Fort Worth, Texas, U.S.
- Died: c. January 24, 2024 (aged 43); Moore, Oklahoma, U.S.
- Education: Moore High School
- Occupation: Pornographic film actress
- Years active: 2002–2017; 2019–2024
- Spouse: Rich Taylor (m. 2005; div. 2012) Richard H. Wilcox (m. 2019)
- Children: 1
- Website: jessejane.com

Jesse Jane (born Cynthia Ann Howell July 16, 1980 – c. January 24, 2024) was an American pornographic film actress. She became one of the few adult film performers of the 2000s to make the transition into mainstream film and television roles.

Jane was an exclusive contract performer for Digital Playground between 2002 and 2014, starring in the Pirates series of pornographic films. She retired from the adult film industry in 2017 after a career spanning nearly two decades. She was a member of the NightMoves Hall of Fame, XRCO Hall of Fame, and the AVN Hall of Fame.

== Early life ==
Jane was born Cynthia Ann Howell on July 16, 1980, in Fort Worth, Texas. According to a 2006 interview she gave to The Oklahoma Gazette, her family relocated to the Oklahoma City area where her parents worked at Tinker Air Force Base. In 1998, she graduated with honors from Moore High School.

== Career ==
Before securing a position in a commercial for the restaurant chain Hooters, Jane had previously modeled for retailers such as 5-7-9 and David's Bridal. She subsequently ascended the ranks within the Hooters organization, ultimately attaining the role of regional training coordinator. She later made the decision to transition into a full-time career as a Hawaiian Tropic bikini model.

=== Pornographic film ===
Jane avoided the "shock value" trend prevalent in mid-2000s pornography, according to The New York Times. She signed an exclusive contract with the adult film production company Digital Playground, appearing in Pirates (2005) and its sequel, Pirates II: Stagnetti's Revenge (2008), as a ship's first officer on a mission against a group of evil pirates. The films, which respectively cost $1 million and $8 million to produce, were among the highest-budget pornographic films ever made.

In 2006, Jane and Kirsten Price became the hosts of Playboy TV's most popular live show, Night Calls; Jane also hosted the AVN Awards that year. She was named December's Booble Cover Girl of the Month.

Jane was the sex columnist for Chéri and Ralph magazines beginning in 2007. Later that year, she hosted Playboy TV's Naughty Amateur Home Videos, and The New York Times reported that Jane intended to have her breast enhancement surgery re-done for high-definition movies. She hosted the F.A.M.E. Awards in 2008, and the XBIZ Awards in 2008 and 2011.

Jane launched a line of signature sex toys circa 2010. She was the Australian Penthouse Pet of the Month in November 2010. Jane hosted the AVN Awards again in 2013. In 2011, 2012, and 2014, she was named by CNBC as one of the twelve most popular stars in porn.

In 2017, Jane announced that she would retire from the adult industry, although she briefly returned in 2019 to shoot her first interracial scene for Blacked.com.

=== Mainstream film, television, and other media ===
Jane became one of the few adult film performers of the 2000s to make the transition into mainstream Hollywood roles. In 2003, she had an uncredited appearance in Baywatch: Hawaiian Wedding and appeared in the reality TV series Family Business. In 2004, Jane made a cameo appearance in the film Starsky & Hutch, appeared on the cover of Drowning Pool's second studio album Desensitized, and in the music video for Drowning Pool's single "Step Up". She was a guest star on the HBO dramedy series Entourage. She also appeared in the reality TV series Bad Girls Club and Gene Simmons Family Jewels.

In a 2009 CNBC documentary titled Porn: Business of Pleasure, Jane is the focus of the final six-minute segment, which details her career and her life outside the porn industry. Later that year she appeared in the film Middle Men. In 2011, she appeared in the film Bucky Larson: Born to Be a Star.

== Personal life and death ==
In 2000, Jane gave birth to her son. In 2005, she married Rich Taylor. On March 1, 2012, she announced on Twitter that she was getting divorced. In 2019, she married Richard H. Wilcox.

In 2011, Jane had her name legally changed from Cynthia Taylor to Jesse Jane.

On January 24, 2024, Jane and her boyfriend, Brett Hasenmueller, were found dead from an apparent drug overdose at their home in Moore, Oklahoma. An autopsy report later confirmed that she died from an accidental overdose of cocaine and fentanyl.

== Awards ==
List of accolades received by Jesse Jane
Awards
Award	Won
AVN Awards	9
Eroticline Awards	2
F.A.M.E. Awards	3
F.O.X.E. Awards	1
Hot d'Or Awards	1
NightMoves Awards	5
Venus Awards	2
XBIZ Awards	4
XRCO Awards	1
Others	9
- Total number of wins
Totals	37

Year	Event	Award	Film
2003	NightMoves Award	Best New Starlet (Editor's Choice)	—N/a
2004	Delta di Venere Award	Best American Actress	—N/a
2004	Venus Award	Best Actress, USA	—N/a
2006	AVN Award	Best All-Girl Sex Scene – Video (with Janine)	Pirates
2006	F.O.X.E. Award	Female Fan Favorite	—N/a
2006	NightMoves Award	Best Actress (Editor's Choice)	—N/a
2006	Scandinavian Adult Award	Best Selling International Star	—N/a
2007	AVN Award	Best All-Girl Sex Scene – Video (with Jana Cova, Sophia Santi, & Teagan Presley)	Island Fever 4
2007	F.A.M.E. Award	Hottest Body	—N/a
2007	Eroticline Award	Best U.S. Actress	—N/a
2007	Adultcon Award	Top 20 Adult Actresses	—N/a
2008	F.A.M.E. Award	Hottest Body	—N/a
2008	Eroticline Award	Best U.S. Actress	—N/a
2008	NightMoves Award	Hall of Fame	—N/a
2009	AVN Award	Best All-Girl Group Sex Scene (with Stoya, Adrianna Lynn, Brianna Love, Lexxi Tyler, Memphis Monroe, Priya Rai, Shay Jordan, Sophia Santi)	Cheerleaders
2009	AVN Award	Best All-Girl Couples Sex Scene (with Belladonna)	Pirates II: Stagnetti's Revenge
2009	Hot d'Or Award	Best American Actress	Pirates II: Stagnetti's Revenge
2009	F.A.M.E. Award	Hottest Body	—N/a
2010	Fame Registry Award	Contract Star of the Year	—N/a
2010	NightMoves Award	Best Feature Dancer (Fan's Choice)	—N/a
2011	Fame Registry Award	Fan Favorite Hottest Blonde	—N/a
2011	Fame Registry Award	Contract Star of the Year	—N/a
2011	AVN Award	Best All-Girl Group Sex Scene (with Katsuni, Kayden Kross, Riley Steele, & Raven Alexis)	Body Heat
2011	AVN Award	Wildest Sex Scene (Fan Award) (with Katsuni, Kayden Kross, Riley Steele, & Raven Alexis)	Body Heat
2012	AVN Award	Best Supporting Actress	Fighters
2012	AVN Award	Hottest Sex Scene (Fan Award) (with Kayden Kross, Riley Steele, Stoya, BiBi Jones, & Manuel Ferrara)	Babysitters 2
2012	XRCO Award	Hall of Fame	—N/a
2012	NightMoves Award	Best Female Performer (Fan's Choice)	—N/a
2012	Fame Registry Award	Fan Favorite Hottest Blonde	—N/a
2012	Fame Registry Award	Contract Star of the Year	—N/a
2013	AVN Award	Hall of Fame	—N/a
2013	Fame Registry Award	Contract Star of the Year	—N/a
2013	XBIZ Award	Best Scene – All-Girl with (Kayden Kross, Riley Steele, Selena Rose, & Vicki Chase)	Mothers & Daughters
2014	XBIZ Award	Best Scene – Feature Movie (with (Kayden Kross, Riley Steele, Stoya, Selena Rose, & Manuel Ferrara)	Code of Honor
2014	Venus Award	Lifetime Achievement Award	—N/a
2016	XBIZ Award	Best Sex Scene – Gonzo Release (with Manuel Ferrara)	Jesse: Alpha Female
2016	XBIZ Award	Performer Showcase of the Year	Jesse: Alpha Female

== Selected filmography ==
Film
Year	Title	Role	Notes
2003	Beat the Devil		
2003	Baywatch: Hawaiian Wedding	Bikini girl	Uncredited role
2004	Starsky & Hutch		Cameo
2005	Pirates	Jules	
2008	Pirates II: Stagnetti's Revenge	Jules	
2009	Middle Men	Herself	
2010	Let the Game Begin	Temptation	
2011	Bucky Larson: Born to Be a Star	AFA presenter	
2009	Frat Party	Herself	

Television
Year	Title	Role	Notes
2003	Family Business	Herself	
2005	Entourage	Herself	Season 2
2006	The Tonight Show with Jay Leno	Jaywalking interviewee	
2006–2007	Night Calls	Co-host	
2007	Gene Simmons Family Jewels	Herself	
2009	Bad Girls Club	Herself	
2009	Porn: Business of Pleasure	Herself	CNBC TV documentary
