= Digital Playground =

American pornographic movie studio

Digital Playground Inc.
- Type: Subsidiary
- Industry: Pornography
- Founded: 1993; 33 years ago
- Founder: Joone
- Headquarters: Burbank, California, U.S.
- Area served: Worldwide
- Parent: Aylo
- Website: www.digitalplayground.com

Digital Playground Inc. is an American independent pornographic film studio, headquartered in Burbank, California. It has been called one of the five biggest porn studios and, in 2006, was described by Reuters as one of the handful of studios that dominate the U.S. porn industry.

== History ==
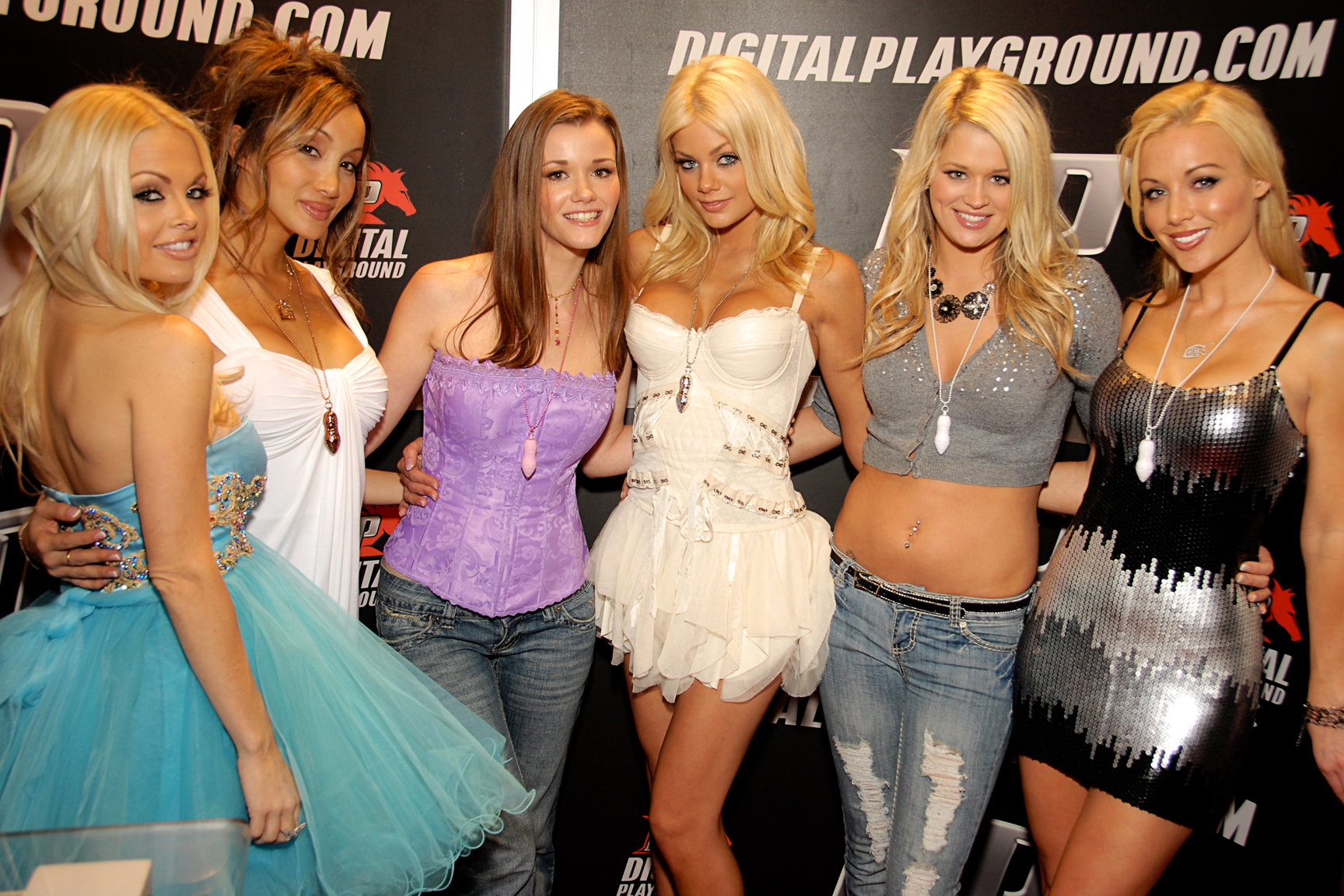
Pornographic actresses for the studio Digital Playground. From left to right: Jesse Jane, Céline Tran, Raven Alexis, Riley Steele, Janie Summers, Kayden Kross, at the AVN Adult Entertainment Expo (2010)

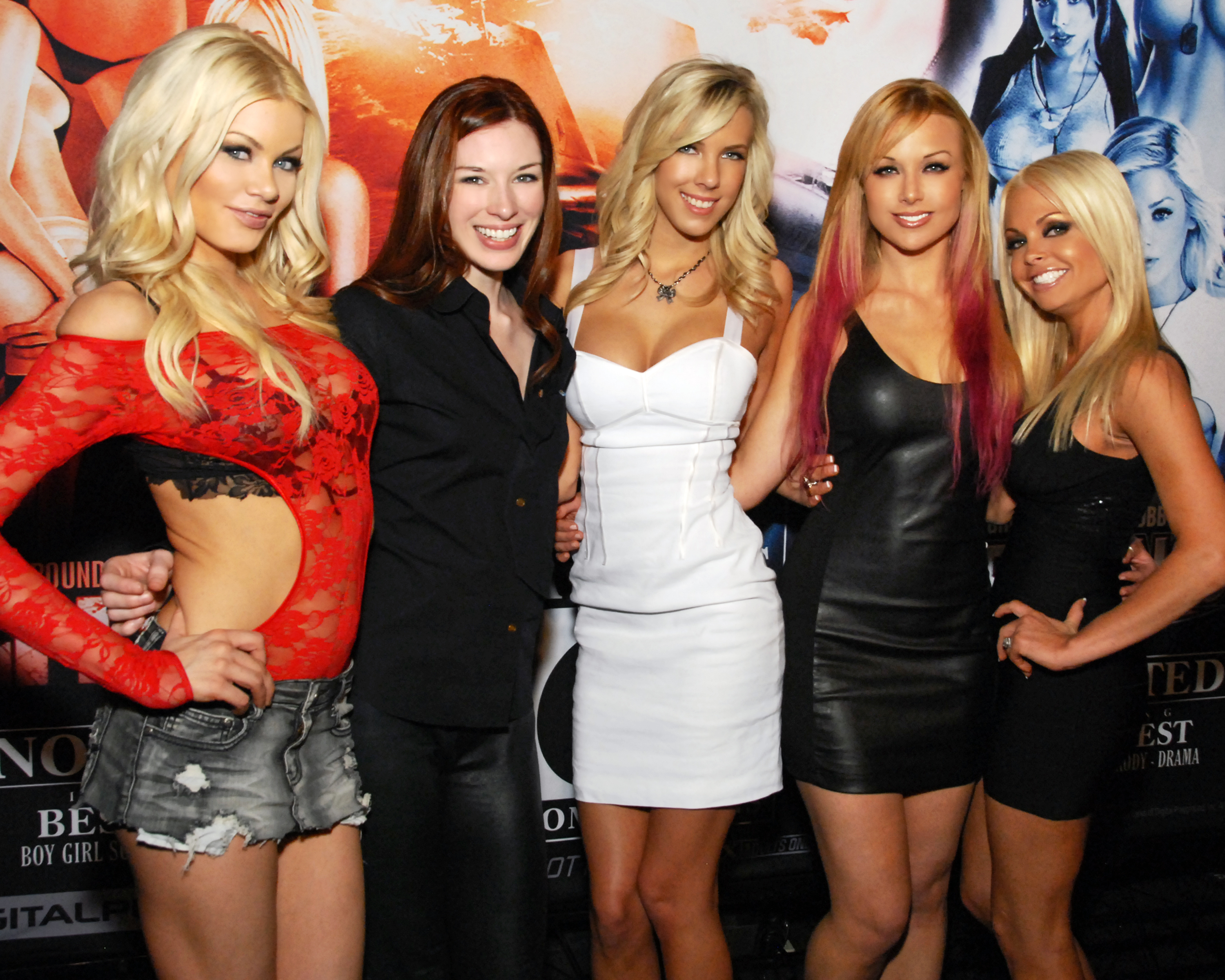
Digital Playground Girls: Riley Steele, Stoya, BiBi Jones, Kayden Kross, and Jesse Jane, at the AVN Expo, Las Vegas, Nevada on January 18, 2012

Adult director Joone founded the company in 1993, originally making adult CD-ROM computer games. The company became an innovator in making pornography available on personal computers.

In 2003, DP began working with a company specializing in hologram technology, with the aim of bringing the actress "into the viewer's living room". DP began filming in high-definition in 2005. In January 2006 the company chose Blu-ray Disc over rival format HD DVD because Joone felt Blu-ray Disc was more future-proofed.

DP initially had difficulty finding a company prepared to produce its films in the Blu-ray Disc format, as companies that replicated DVDs were reluctant to deal with the pornography industry. The Digital Playground studios have been at the forefront for iPads, HD and three-dimension technology for cinema and television in the porn industry. The company has claimed that "many technology brands have used the adult industry (and DP, in particular), to test new markets" because of "the sheer scale of the porn industry".

The studio was acquired by Aylo (then known as Manwin) in March 2012.

In 2018, the Government of India banned the websites of Digital Playground, among other porn websites, after a Uttarakhand High Court order demanding the same in a rape case where the perpetrators stated they were motivated to do so after watching online pornography.

== Innovation ==
Digital Playground introduced the virtual sex genre of CD-ROMs and DVDs, in which the viewer can control a famous pornographic actress by selecting from a menu of explicit scenes. The first film in the series was released in 1998. In the series, the actress looks directly at the camera, and appears to talk directly to the viewer. Virtual Sex with Jenna Jameson is one of the best-selling adult DVDs of all time according to adultdvdempire.com sales charts.

In 2004, Digital Playground produced the first HD pornographic film, Island Fever 3, shot on location in Tahiti and Bora Bora.

== Site security breach ==
On March 12, 2012, it was reported that the website for Digital Playground was breached, resulting in customer information being compromised. Included in the information breached and portions made public were usernames, e-mail addresses, passwords, credit card numbers and expiration dates. The membership page on that date stated that their member services were "temporarily unavailable" and that "We are currently verifying the security parameters on this site and upgrading the entire system in order to better safeguard your information."

== Directors ==
Digital Playground's production team is led by director Robby D. and producer/director Joone who directed the Virtual Sex series.

== Releases ==
Most notable films released by Digital Playground are:

- Jack's Playground series of films (2003-2008)
- Pirates (2005)
- Babysitters (2007)
- Pirates II: Stagnetti's Revenge (2008)
- Cheerleaders (2008)

== Awards ==
=== Studio Awards ===
- XBIZ Award: 2006 Studio of the Year
- XBIZ Award: 2007 Studio of the Year
- XBIZ Award: 2009 Studio of the Year
- XBIZ Award: 2011 Studio of the Year
- XBIZ Award Nominee: 2013 Studio of the Year

=== Individual Awards and Recognition ===
- 2013 XBIZ Award Nomination – Robby D. for 'Director of the Year – Body of Work', 'Director of the Year – Feature Release' for Nurses 2 and 'Director of the Year – Non-Feature Release' for Bad Girls 7
- 2018 XBIZ Award – Dick Bush for 'Director of the Year – Body of Work

=== Porn industry awards ===
The following is a non-exhaustive list of porn industry awards that DP films have won:

- 2001 AVN Award – 'Best Interactive DVD' for Virtual Sex With Tera Patrick
- 2002 NightMoves – 'Best Adult Production Company'
- 2002 AVN Award – 'Best Interactive DVD' for Virtual Sex with Devon
- 2002 AVN Award – 'Top Renting Release of the Year' for Island Fever
- 2003 AVN Award – 'Best Interactive DVD' for Virtual Sex with Janine
- 2004 NightMoves – 'Best Adult Production Company'
- 2005 AVN Award – 'Best Gonzo Series' for Jack's Playground
- 2005 NightMoves – Best Adult Production Company
- 2005 NightMoves – First Choice Award (Pirates)
- 2006 AVN Award – Best DVD (Pirates)
- 2006 AVN Award – Best Video Feature (Pirates)
- 2007 NightMoves – 'Best Adult production Company'
- 2007 AVN Award – 'Best POV Series' for Jack's POV
- 2007 AVN Award – Best Renting Title of the Year (Pirates)
- 2007 AVN Award – Best Selling Title of the Year (Pirates)
- 2007 AVN Award – 'Best Vignette Series' for Jack's Playground
- 2008 NightMoves – 'Best Adult Production Company'
- 2008 NightMoves – 'Best Feature Production' Cheerleaders
- 2008 AVN Award – 'Best Specialty Series, Other Genre' for Jack's Leg Show
- 2008 AVN Award – 'Best Vignette Release' for Babysitters
- 2008 AVN Award – Top Selling Title of the Year – 2007 (Pirates)
- 2009 NightMoves – Best Adult Film (Pirates II)
- 2009 AVN Award – Best High-Definition Production (Pirates II: Stagnetti's Revenge)
- 2009 AVN Award – 'Best POV Release' for Jack's POV 9
- 2009 AVN Award – 'Top Renting and Selling Release' for Cheerleaders
- 2009 AVN Award – Best Video Feature (Pirates II: Stagnetti's Revenge)
- 2009 AVN Award – 'Best Vignette Release' for Cheerleaders
- 2010 NightMoves – 'Best Adult Production Company'*
- 2012 XBIZ Award – 'Parody Release of the Year – Drama' for Top Guns
- 2012 XBIZ Award – 'All-Girl Release of the Year' for Cherry
- 2012 XBIZ Award – 'Best Special Effects' for Top Guns
- 2012 XBIZ Award – 'Best Editing' for Fighters
- 2015 XBIZ Award – 'Best Special Effects' for Apocalypse X
- 2017 AVN Award – 'Best Foreign Feature' for Sherlock XXX
- 2018 AVN Award – 'Best Foreign Feature' for Bulldogs

== Ranking ==
As of January 2020, Digital Playground has a traffic ranking of 53,832.
