= Bunny Colby =

American adult film actress (born 1992)

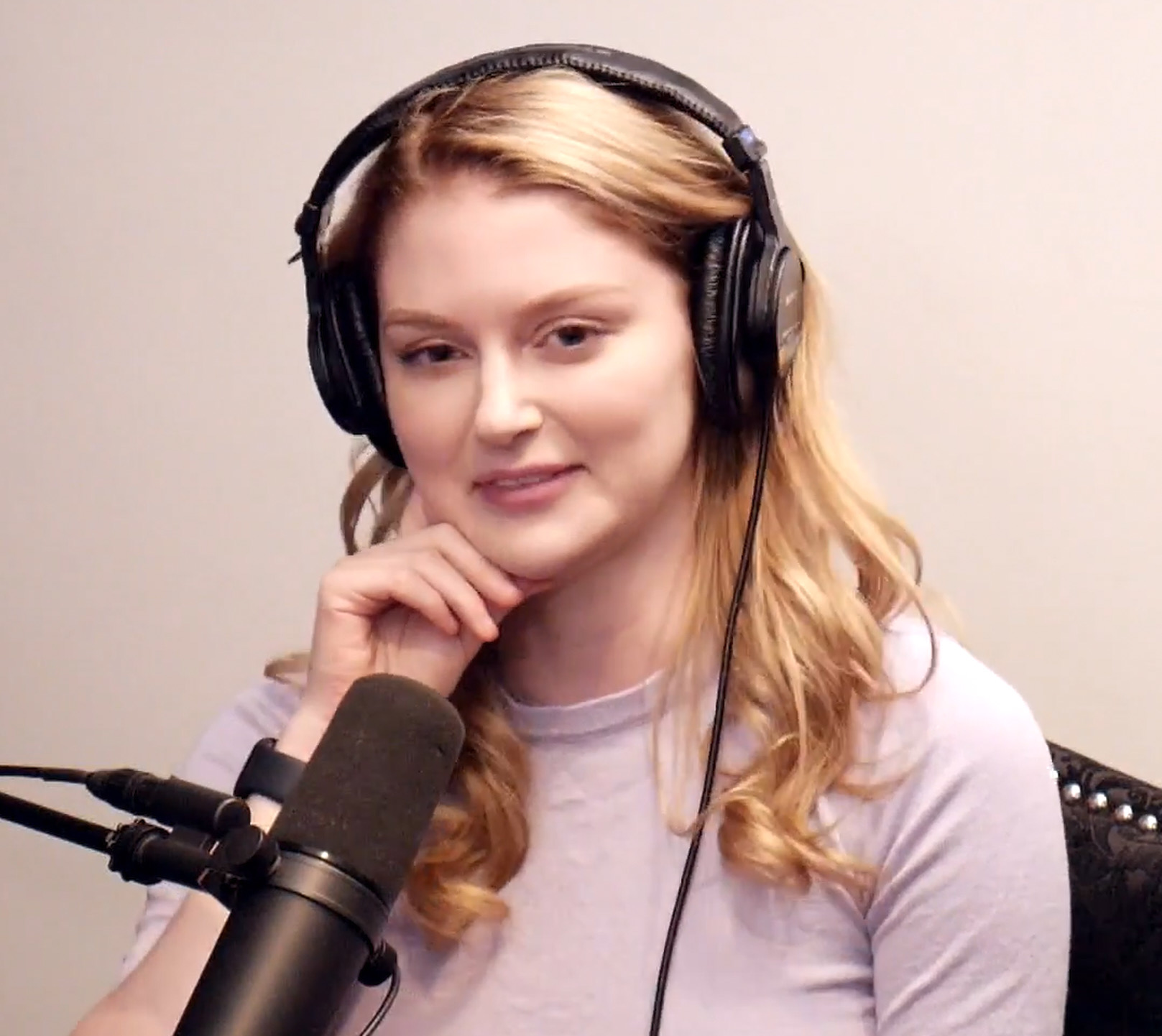
- Colby in 2021
- Other name: Nadya Nabakova
- Occupations: Adult film actress; webcam model
- Years active: 2017–present
- Awards: Penthouse Pet of the Month (2020)

Bunny Colby, also known as Nadya Nabakova, (Note: /ˈnɑːdjə nəˈbɑːkəvə/ NAH-dya nuh-BAH-kuh-vuh) is an American pornographic film actress. She entered the adult film industry in 2017, initially working with Aylo before rebranding as Bunny Colby and moving to self-booking, giving her more control over her career. She has appeared in productions for studios such as Naughty America, Vixen, and Devil's Film, and was named Penthouse Pet of the Month in January 2020.

Colby worked for the Oregon Department of Human Services prior to joining the adult entertainment industry. She began webcam modeling part-time before pursuing adult films full-time. Over the years, she has received nominations for industry awards like AVN and XBIZ.

== Early life ==
From a young age, Colby displayed an interest in creative expression, particularly enjoying storytelling and improvisation. She explains in an interview that she was drawn to humor and imaginative play early on, traits that would later influence her approach to her professional work.

== Career ==
Colby began her professional life working in elder care in Portland, Oregon, where she was employed by Oregon's Department of Human Services. In this role, she assisted the elderly and individuals with disability, helping them access food stamps, medical insurance, and other services. She ended up leaving the job citing low pay and an uncaring work environment among her colleagues.

Seeking an alternative path, Colby began experimenting with webcam modeling, initially through platforms such as MyFreeCams. Contrary to her expectations, she found the experience positive and the audience supportive, and camming became an important outlet for her both financially and socially. Her success on webcam sites encouraged her to consider a career in adult entertainment more seriously. During this period, she rebranded professionally as Bunny Colby, adopting the new name for her work in adult films and self-booking her performances.

In September 2017, at the age of 25, Colby moved from Portland to Los Angeles after signing with LA Direct Models, a leading adult industry agency. She made her professional debut in a foot-fetish themed scene for Babes, opposite Ryan McLane. Despite initial nerves, she later described the set as welcoming and professional, which helped ease her transition into adult film work.

Colby was among several LA Direct Models clients who brought forward complaints before the California Labor Commissioner's Office, alleging unethical and illegal business practices on the part of the company and its owner, Derek Hay. In October 2019, the commissioner ruled in her favor, awarding her $3,500 in unpaid earnings with interest, along with $11,450 in attorney's fees. The case, along with similar complaints, was later featured in a 2019 NBC investigative special.

Following her debut, Colby began performing for a wide range of studios, including Girlfriends Films, Brazzers, Bangbros, Blacked, Zero Tolerance, Third Degree, Deeper, Vixen, Kelly Madison Networks, Naughty America, Devil's Film, MissaX, DareDorm, and Kink.com, among others. She has performed in a variety of genres, ranging from fetish-themed and amateur-style productions to feature productions. One of her early career highlights was a shoot for Vixen with Xander Corvus, which she cited as a particularly positive and memorable experience due to the company's polished production style.

Colby appears in both traditional and fetish productions, explaining in an interview that fetish scenes are "super diverse and practice more acting than your typical porno scene." This versatility has led to a strong presence in both mainstream studio productions and on online subscription platforms, where she maintains a direct connection with fans. Her rising profile was recognized in January 2020 when she was named Penthouse Magazine's "Pet of the Month."

Outside of adult entertainment, Colby has also been involved in animal rescue and welfare initiatives, a recurring theme throughout her career.

As of 2023, Colby has appeared in more than 390 credited films, in addition to her continued webcam and independent online work.

== Animal welfare ==
Colby has been active in animal welfare, particularly with cats. She has fostered kittens and hospice animals through rescue programs, describing the work as a personal commitment outside of her adult film career.

She has also participated in data collection projects on feline leukemia and other conditions, working in partnership with rescue organizations to track health outcomes.

In interviews, Colby has said that fostering and rescue work provides balance to the challenges of the adult industry, and she has encouraged fans to support adoption and no-kill shelter initiatives.

== Media appearances ==
=== Louis Theroux: Forbidden America ===
In 2022, Colby appeared as herself in the BBC documentary series Louis Theroux: Forbidden America, specifically in the third episode titled "Porn's MeToo". The episode explored the adult film industry in the wake of the #MeToo movement, examining how creator-driven platforms like OnlyFans have given performers greater autonomy and financial independence. Colby's participation positioned her as a relevant voice in discussions about consent, power dynamics, and industry ethics.

=== Podcast Appearances ===
Colby has been a guest on the podcast Holly Randall Unfiltered, most notably in the episode titled "Bunny Colby: Death, Family, and Dick Size". Colby also appeared on the Demon Seed Radio podcast in the episode titled "Blonde Bombshell Bunny Colby", originally aired on July 26, 2019.

=== Summary of Appearances ===
Year	Title	Medium	Role / Episode	Notes
2022	Louis Theroux: Forbidden America	Documentary Series	Self / "Porn's MeToo"	Examined the #MeToo movement's impact on the adult film industry.
2019	Holly Randall Unfiltered	Podcast	Guest / "Bunny Colby: Death, Family, and Dick Size"	In-depth interview covering personal history, career, and philosophical views on death and family.
2019	Demon Seed Radio	Podcast	Guest / "Blonde Bombshell Bunny Colby"	Focused on unconventional topics outside typical industry questions.

== Personal life ==
Colby has spoken openly about her close relationship with her mother, who has been a significant source of support throughout her life and career.

Outside of her professional work, Colby enjoys creative pursuits such as storytelling, improvisation, and humor, which she has described as integral to her personality and outlook on life.

=== Bumble Ban Incident ===
In 2021, Colby was banned from the dating app Bumble after the platform flagged her profile for being associated with the adult industry. Colby had included her Instagram handle in her profile bio, which she used to allow potential matches to connect with her outside the app. She stated that her profile was "very tame" and did not promote her adult content.

Colby explained that she was using the app to meet a romantic partner during the COVID-19 pandemic and expressed frustration that sex workers were unfairly targeted. The incident received coverage in mainstream media, sparking discussions about the treatment of sex workers on dating platforms and the limitations imposed on adult industry professionals in digital spaces.

== Awards and nominations ==
Year	Award	Category	Film	Result
2018	AVN Fan Awards	Hottest Newcomer	—N/a	Nominated
2020	Penthouse Pets	Penthouse Pet of the Month	—N/a	Won
2020	AVN Awards	Best Transgender One-on-One Sex Scene	Transsexual Mashup 3	Nominated
2020	Spank Bank Awards	Best 'After' Hair	—N/a	Nominated
2020	Spank Bank Awards	Buxom Beauty of the Year	—N/a	Nominated
2020	Spank Bank Awards	Creampied Cutie of the Year	—N/a	Nominated
2020	Spank Bank Awards	Customs/Clips Specialist of the Year	—N/a	Nominated
2020	Spank Bank Awards	Most Voluptuous Vixen	—N/a	Nominated
2020	Spank Bank Technical Awards	Proof That Money (Specifically $15K) CAN Buy Happiness	—N/a	Won
2020	Transgender Erotica Awards	Best Non-TS Female Performer	—N/a	Nominated
2021	Transgender Erotica Awards	Best Girl/Girl Scene	TS Pussy Hunters	Nominated
2022	XBIZ Awards	Best Sex Scene – All Girl	Lesbian House Hunters 20	Nominated
2023	AVN Awards	Best All-Girl Group Sex Scene	From Bad to Worse	Nominated
