= Olivia Nova =

American pornographic film actress (1997–2018)

- Born: Lexi Forte; April 28, 1997; Eden Prairie, Minnesota, U.S.
- Died: January 7, 2018 (aged 20); Las Vegas, Nevada, U.S.
- Occupations: Pornographic film actress; adult model

Lexi Forte (April 28, 1997 – January 7, 2018), known professionally as Olivia Nova, was an American pornographic film actress and adult model. Only being in the adult industry for about a year, Forte's death became widely notable for its suddenness and her death coinciding with those of other actresses in the industry. She had 35 acting credits before her death, being nominated for an AVN Award in 2018 and two XBIZ Europa awards in 2019.

== Early and personal life ==
Lexi Forte was born in Eden Prairie, Minnesota, on April 28, 1997.

Her boyfriend allegedly committed suicide in the months before her death.

== Professional career ==
Forte starred in films such as Digital Sin's 'Bound for Sex 2' and Girlfriends Films' 'Please Make Me a Lesbian 7', as well as work for Brazzers and Vixen.

== Death ==
In the weeks before her death, Forte posted on Twitter her sadness over being alone during the holidays, also denying accusations that she was a heroin user. A friend of Forte's stated after her death that she had been trying to get sober in the months before her death.

According to KFOX14, Las Vegas police were dispatched to Forte's home at approximately 9 A.M. after the discovery of her body by the Fire Department.

LA Direct Models, Forte's talent agency, announced on January 8, 2018, that she had died the day before, according to the Las Vegas coroner's office.

== Legacy ==
Twelve days after Forte's death, fellow pornographic film actress Olivia Lua died of an accidental methamphetamine overdose. Lua and Forte's deaths coincided with the deaths of fellow actresses Shyla Stylez, August Ames, and Yurizan Beltran. These deaths inspired adult actresses Sara Jay and Angelina Castro to host industry support events to improve the mental health of adult actors and actresses.

Tila Tequila, an American model known for her controversial statements, stated Forte and other actresses' deaths were the will of God. Her statements were widely condemned.

In a 2019 court case, former pornographic film actress Andy Rye stated Derek Hay, owner of LA Direct Models, showed no emotion for and provided no support after the deaths of Forte and Lua.
