= Olivia Lua =

American pornographic film actress (1994–2018)

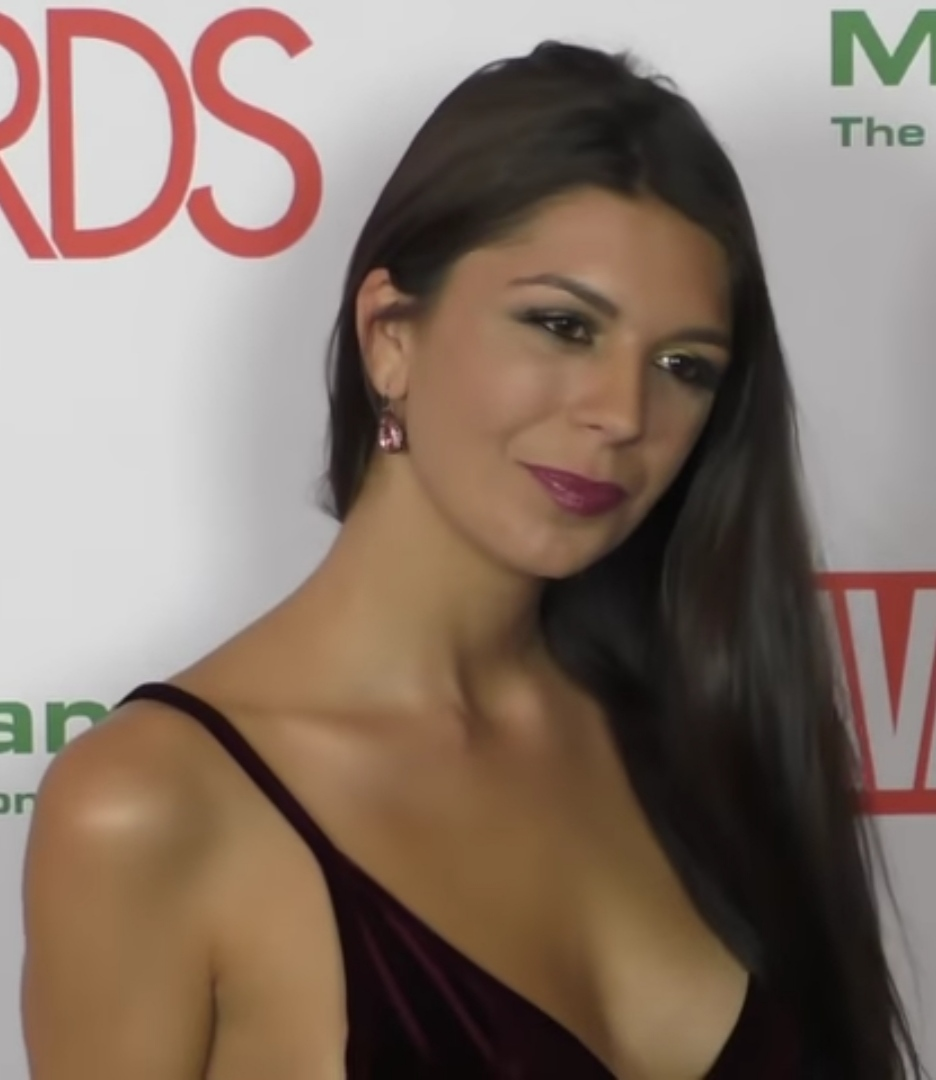
- Lua at 34th AVN Awards, 2016
- Born: September 19, 1994; Philadelphia, Pennsylvania, US
- Died: January 18, 2018 (aged 23); Hollywood, California, U.S.
- Cause of death: Drug overdose
- Occupation: Pornographic film actress

Olivia Lua (September 19, 1994 – January 18, 2018), also known professionally as Olivia Voltaire, was an American pornographic film actress.

== Career ==
Her filmography included appearances in "Sneaky Sex", "GF Revenge", and "Vixen". In April 2017, Lua was signed to LA Direct Models, though she did not appear in any films after October of that year due to "personal challenges".

She cited Sasha Grey as one of her personal inspirations to enter the adult film industry. She also attended the 34th AVN Awards, where she was nominated as 'Hottest Newcomer'.

== Personal life and death ==
Having struggled with drug addiction in the past, Lua checked herself into a drug rehabilitation in Hollywood, Los Angeles in October 2017. On January 17, one day before her death, Lua posted on her personal Twitter "I feel it everywhere, nothing scares me anymore."

Lua died on January 18, 2018, aged 23. Her death was confirmed on January 21. An autopsy by the Los Angeles County Coroner's Office determined her cause of death to be an accidental overdose on methamphetamine.

=== Reactions ===
Many throughout the adult industry and outside of it mourned the death of Lua. In response to the large number of deaths, particularly suicides, within the adult film industry, actresses Sara Jay and Angelina Castro hosted multiple industry support events to improve the mental health of those within the industry.

In a 2019 lawsuit against LA Direct Models owner Derek Hay, actress Shay Evans criticized Hay for an alleged lack of remorse after the deaths of Lua and Olivia Nova.
