= Yurizan Beltran =

American pornographic actress and model (1986–2017)

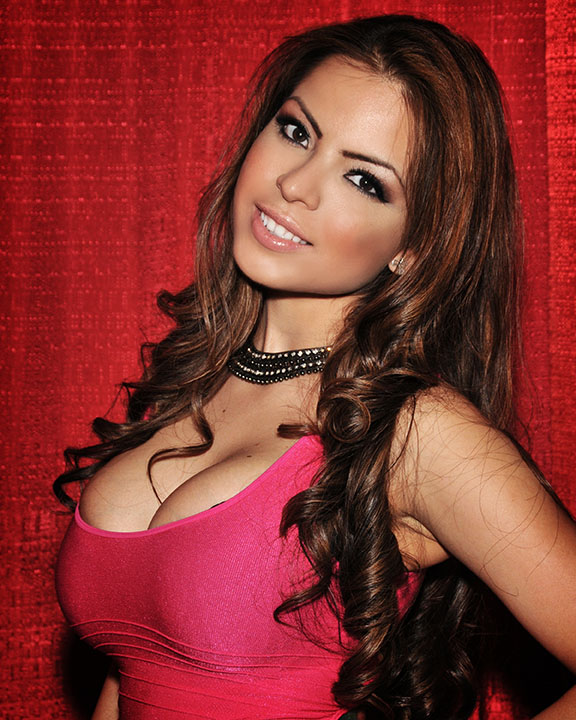
- Beltran in 2013
- Born: Yurizan Beltrán; November 2, 1986; Los Angeles, California, U.S.
- Died: December 13, 2017 (aged 31); Bellflower, California, U.S.
- Cause of death: Drug overdose
- Other name: Yuri Luv
- Occupations: Pornographic film actress; model; actress
- Years active: 2005–2017

Yurizan Beltrán (November 2, 1986 – December 13, 2017) was an American pornographic actress, model, and mainstream actress. In addition to her successful pornographic and modeling career, Beltran also starred in the 2006 horror film Werewolf in a Women's Prison and the 2017 romantic comedy Rice on White.

During her pornographic career, Beltran received positive attention from her critics and peers. Over the course of her career, Beltran received multiple high industry award nominations from AVN, NMA, XBIZ, and the XRCO.

On December 13, 2017, she was found dead in her California apartment of an apparent drug overdose.

== Career ==
Beginning in 2003, Beltran began doing feature modeling and appearances in Southern California as a Hooters girl. In 2005, she began adult modeling when she decided to launch her first website, SweetYurizan.com. In 2006, she appeared in her first mainstream film a low budget horror film Werewolf in a Women's Prison.

In 2005, Beltran was featured in her first adult film, a non-sex solo performance for JB Video titled Yurizan. In 2006 and 2007, Beltran only modeled, she was featured by Hustler, Playboy, and Penthouse. She was also a covergirl for Lowrider, posing in a gold bikini with a Chevrolet convertible in the magazine's December issue. In 2009, she returned to porn only shooting lesbian, solo or non-sex films. She shot with New Sensations, Reality Kings, Digital Playground, and Twistys.com.

In the 2010 film Big Tits Round Asses 20 by Bang Bros, Beltran made her boy/girl scene debut. In 2011, she was nominated for Best Web Star 28th AVN Awards. Also in 2011, Beltran began working with Brazzers, and shot six films with them that year. In 2012, she continued her success and was nominated for Unsung Starlet of the Year at the 29th AVN Awards as well as Best Latina Performer from NightMoves Awards.

At the 30th AVN Awards, Beltran was nominated for Best All-Girl Group Sex Scene for her work in Training Day: a XXX Parody with her co-stars Chanel Preston and Nyomi Banxxx.

In 2017, she played Jade in the romantic comedy film Rice on White directed by Talun Hsu.

== Death ==
Beltran died of a drug overdose at her apartment in Bellflower, California on December 13, 2017. She was found by her landlord, lying in her bed, beside a spilled pill bottle. On April 17, 2018 the LA Medical Examiner revealed her official cause of death was bronchopneumonia, or inflammation of the lungs, which was caused by an overdose of the prescription opioid hydrocodone.

There were a number of other high-profile deaths in the porn industry around the same time: Shyla Stylez died in November 2017; August Ames died by suicide eight days prior to Beltran's death; and in January 2018, Olivia Lua and Olivia Nova died. Their deaths generated discussion regarding whether the adult industry was doing enough for performers' physical and mental health, in light of the demands the industry places on its performers, particularly female ones.

== Filmography ==
=== Film ===
Year	Work	Role	Notes
2006	Werewolf in a Women's Prison	Kelly	
2017	Rice on White	Jade	

=== Television ===
Year	Show	Role	Notes
2010	27th AVN Awards Red Carpet Show	Herself	Television award show

=== Partial filmography ===
- Not Monday Night Football XXX (2006)
- Ticklicious (2009)
- Big Naturals (2009)
- Fly Girls (2009)
- Thats My Girl (2010)
- We Live Together (2010)
- Inside Story (2010)

== See also ==
- List of pornographic performers by decade
- List of pornographic film actors who appeared in mainstream films
