= Black ice (disambiguation) =

Black ice is a hazardous ice coating on horizontal surfaces.

Black Ice may also refer to:

== Film ==
- Black Ice (1992 film), a Canadian-American thriller
- Black Ice (1994 film), by Stan Brakhage
- Black Ice (2007 film), a Finnish film
- Black Ice (2013 film), an Irish film
- Black Ice (2022 film), a Canadian documentary by Hubert Davis

== Literature ==
- Black Ice (memoir), a 1991 memoir by American author Lorene Cary
- The Black Ice, a 1993 book written by Michael Connelly
- Black Ice (Sussex novel), a 1997 novel by Lucy Sussex
- Black Ice (Fitzpatrick novel), a 2014 novel by Becca Fitzpatrick
- Black ICE, fictional lethal Intrusion Countermeasures Electronics security software

== Music ==
- Black Ice (band), a deathrock band
- Black Ice (album), by AC/DC or the album's title track
  - Black Ice World Tour, a world concert tour by AC/DC in support of the album
- "Black Ice", a song by Nick Mason and Rick Fenn from the album Profiles
- "Black Ice", a song by Suede from the album Autofiction
- "Black Ice" (song) a song by Goodie Mob from the album Still Standing
- "Black Ice", a song by Maya Hawke from the album Chaos Angel

== Other uses ==
- Black Ice (rapper), American rapper and slam poet, author of the album The Death of Willie Lynch
- Black Ice beers, New Zealand beer produced by Lion (Australasian company)
- Black Ice (synchronized skating team), a synchronized skating team from Ontario
- Superionic water, a phase of water under extreme temperatures and pressures that is black in color
- Stratolaunch Black Ice, a proposed air-launched spaceplane

== See also ==
- Black (disambiguation)
- Ice (disambiguation)
