= Anabolic Video =

Defunct American pornography studio

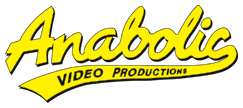
- Type: Private
- Industry: Pornography
- Founded: 1991; 35 years ago
- Defunct: 2013; 13 years ago
- Successor: Diabolic Video (Zero Tolerance Entertainment)
- Headquarters: Chatsworth, Los Angeles, California, United States
- Area served: Worldwide
- Key people: Gregg Alan, Greg Dunn (President)
- Products: Pornographic films

Anabolic Video was an American independent pornographic movie studio headquartered in Chatsworth, California. The studio was a pioneer of gonzo pornography, and is considered one of the most successful gonzo producers. It has since gone out of business.

== History ==
Anabolic, founded in 1991, and its former sister company Diabolic Video were originally headquartered in Venice, California for 10 years. The company soon became one of the pioneers in the field of gonzo pornography, along with other producers like Ed Powers, Rodney Moore and John Stagliano's Evil Angel Video. Gregg Alan ran the company's sales department for 15 years, starting in 1992.

In the mid-1990s, the company grew to incorporate Diabolic Video, owned by Gregg Alan. At the company's peak in the late 1990s/early 2000s, directors like Vince Vouyer, Erik Everhard, John Strong, Jon Dough and Lexington Steele created some of the most critically acclaimed gonzo on the market. Diabolic was created as a separate label in 1998. In 2001 Anabolic and Diabolic moved their headquarters to Chatsworth.

Vouyer's exit to work for Red Light District Video in 2002 eventually led to the mass exodus of 2004, which saw Everhard, Steele and Mike John leave for Red Light, and Dough leave for Devil's Film, where the directors were able to own their own movies. By 2006 the company had produced more than 300 films. In May 2007 Anabolic and Diabolic announced they were ending their partnership, and would operate as separate companies. Diabolic would be run and owned by Gregg Alan and Greg Alves. In 2013 they went out of business.

== Film series ==
The company's most successful series include Anabolic Penetration, Balls Deep, Sweet Cheeks, Nasty Nymphos, The Gangbang Girl, Bring'um Young, Initiations and World Sex Tour.

== Actresses ==
In 1999 Vivian Valentine received a black eye after being hit by Jon Dough during the filming of Rough Sex, but she has said "I have no regrets or bad feelings about it". In June 2004 Alexis Amore signed an acting and directing deal under which she would direct eight to 10 movies and star in six films a year. This made her Anabolic's first "contract girl".

== Directors ==
All directors at Anabolic are under exclusive contract. Current and former Anabolic directors include former Diabolic employee Ricky D, Ken Dark, Ivan, Robby Digital, Tony T. and Sal Genoa.

== Distribution deals ==
In June 2006 gamelink.com added the complete Anabolic back-catalogue to its video-on-demand library. The same month it made its content available on AEBN's VOD service.

In March 2007 SugarVOD also began adding the complete Anabolic library to its video-on-demand service.

In November 2007 Anabolic signed a deal to distribute 65 Paradise Visuals films. Paradise has an extensive library of productions from the Golden Age of Porn, including Christy Canyon’s first feature film Ginger Lynn The Movie, and John Holmes’ last film, The Devil In Mr. Holmes.

== Lawsuits ==
In 2002 Anabolic and Diabolic filed a lawsuit in Los Angeles against several video distributors, alleging illegal copying and distribution of DVDs. The defendants were VIP Services Inc., Lynton Appelson Inc., Aware Distributors Inc. and others. The suit sought to recover illegal profits made from the sale of the fake DVDs, punitive damages and fees for copyright infringement. At least 25 of the two companies' titles had been pirated and supplied to retailers.

In late 1997 Harley-Davidson launched a lawsuit against the company in a federal court in Milwaukee. It objected to scenes in The Gang Bang Girl 20 featuring its motorbikes and memorabilia. The company claimed the film tarnished its image, and could give the impression that Harley-Davidson approved the film.

== Criticism ==
Regan Starr appeared in Rough Sex 2. According to her, "I got the shit kicked out of me." "I was told before the video - and they said this very proudly, mind you - that in this line most of the girls start crying because they're hurting so bad" "I couldn't breathe". "I was being hit and choked". "I was really upset, and they didn't stop". "They kept filming". "You can hear me say, 'Turn the fucking camera off', and they kept going". Director of the Rough Sex series Khan Tusion has commented that Starr "categorically misstates what occurred."

== Awards ==
The following is a selection of some of the major awards Anabolic films have won.

- 1995 AVN Award for 'Best Anal-Themed Release' for Butt Banged Bicycle Babes
- 1996 AVN Award for 'Best Group Sex Scene - Video' for World Sex Tour 1
- 1997 AVN Award for 'Best Gangbang Tape' for Gangbang Girl 17
- 1998 AVN Award for 'Best Gangbang Tape' for Gangbang Girl 19
- 1998 AVN Award for 'Best Anal Sex Scene - Video' for Butt Banged Naughty Nurses
- 2000 AVN Award for 'Best Specialty Release - BDSM' for Rough Sex 1
- 2003 AVN Award for 'Best All-Sex Release' for Bring 'Um Young 9
- 2008 AVN Award for 'Best Ethnic-Themed Release, Asian' for Anabolic Asians 5
- 2009 AVN Award for 'Best Internal Series' for Ass Cream Pies
