= All Alone (film series) =

- DVD cover
- Directed by: Mike Quasar
- Production company: Third Degree Films
- Country: United States
- Language: English

All Alone is a series of pornographic films about female masturbation released between 2006 and 2008. The DVDs are directed by Mike Quasar and produced by Third Degree Films.

== Content ==
All Alone (2006), All Alone 2 (2007), All Alone 3 (2008), and All Alone 4 (2008) are all films over three hours long, featuring twenty scenes on two discs. In each scene, one woman masturbates with either her hands, sex toys or both. Actresses featured include Penny Flame, Audrey Bitoni, Sasha Grey, Alexis Texas, and Brianna Love.

== Reception ==
All Alone 4 won the 2010 AVN Award for Best Solo Release. Before that, Jenna Haze was nominated for the 2008 AVN Award for Best Solo Sex Scene in the original All Alone, as was Celeste Star for All Alone 2. All Alone 2 was also nominated for Best Solo Release in 2008.

The films received some positive reviews. XCritic recommended the first film, referring to it as, "definitely a fun show to watch," though an AVN critic claimed that "it tends toward the monotonous over three hours." An Adult DVD Talk reviewer stated All Alone 2 would be "a must" for men interested in female masturbation, but "I have seen better and more natural solo scenes, and I felt there was not enough chemistry in the action." RogReviews called All Alone 3 a "tremendous solo effort." AVN complimented Quasar on the variety in the girls in the third volume, writing "there's definitely something for every taste." An Adult DVD Talk review called All Alone 4 "an excellent solo girl DVD that you're sure to enjoy." AVN described the fourth film as "Tasteful and elegant, yet dirty and penetrating."

In 2007, AVN commented that the series was "fast becoming the go-to line in this specialty niche."

== Comparisons ==
Don Houston of XCritic commented that the masturbation-themed pornographic film All By Myself, produced by Elegant Angel, was "much like" All Alone, and noted Third Degree and Elegant Angel are competitors. The All By Myself series has also won AVN Awards for Best Solo Release.

An Adult DVD Talk critic argued the pornographic film All Natural Glamour Solos, released by Girlfriends Films in 2011, failed to distinguish itself from All Alone and the Busty Solos series, and complained that "Masturbation videos are usually lame," with "generally everything that's cheap and phony about porn." Despite these criticisms, All Natural Glamour Solos won the AVN Award for Best Solo Release in 2012.
