= Feel the Real =

Studio album by Musiq Soulchild
- Released: September 15, 2017
- Recorded: 2016–2017
- Studio: Castle Hill; The Inkkwell; Atlanta, Georgia
- Genre: R&B, neo soul
- Length: 1:37:18
- Label: Soulstar Music Company, eOne Music
- Producer: Musiq Soulchild (also exec.), BLAQSMURPH, Christopher Bradley, Phil Cornish, GMJR, J'Rell, David Luke, Alexander Plummer, Doobie Powell, Jonathan Troy, Elijah Y. Whittingham, Needlz

Musiq Soulchild chronology
Life on Earth (2016)	Feel the Real (2017)

Feel the Real is the eighth studio album by American R&B singer-songwriter Musiq Soulchild. It was released on September 15, 2017, by eOne Music. It features the singles "Simple Things" and "Start Over" the latter of which reached number 11 on the Billboard Adult R&B Songs chart. In November 2017, the album was nominated for Best R&B Album at the 2018 60th Annual Grammy Awards.

== Track listing ==
Credits adapted from liner notes.

Disc 1
No.	Title	Writer(s)	Producer(s)	Length
1.	"Feel the Real" (featuring Marsha Ambrosius)	Taalib Johnson, Marsha Ambrosius	Doobie Powell	5:34
2.	"Benefits"	Johnson	J. Troy	3:52
3.	"Serendipity" (featuring Willie Hyn)	Johnson, Willie Hyn	Musiq Soulchild, J. Troy, Philip Cornish	3:44
4.	"Sooner or Later"	Johnson	J. Troy	4:08
5.	"My Bad" (featuring Willie Hyn)	Johnson, Hyn	GMJR	5:05
6.	"Start Over"	Johnson, Cyrus Deshield, Campbellson Shackleton	BLAQSMURPH	3:50
7.	"Hard Liquor"	Johnson, June Summers, J'Rell	J'Rell	3:33
8.	"Shudawudacuda"	Johnson	J. Troy	3:30
9.	"Broken Hearts"	Johnson, Summers, J'rell, Lo Key	J'Rell	3:55
10.	"Love Me Back"	Johnson	BLAQSMURPH	4:05
11.	"I'm Good"	Johnson	J. Troy	3:26
12.	"Jussa Lil Bih" (featuring BLAQGxLD)	Johnson, Hyn	Needlz, BLAQSMURPH	3:30

Disc 2
No.	Title	Writer(s)	Producer(s)	Length
1.	"Humble Pie"	Johnson, Hyn	GMJR	3:41
2.	"Party Life"	Johnson, Deshield, Shackleton	BLAQSMURPH	3:49
3.	"One More Time" (featuring Willie Hyn and The Husel)	Johnson, Hyn, The Husel, Alexander Lloyd	David Luke	5:28
4.	"Let Go"	Johnson	Musiq Soulchild	3:54
5.	"Test Drive"	Johnson, Summers, J'Rell	J'Rell	3:44
6.	"Like the Weather"	Johnson, Christopher Bradley	Chris Theory	3:26
7.	"Fact of Love"	Johnson	Musiq Soulchild, J. Troy	3:33
8.	"Heaven Only Knows"	Johnson, Summers, J'Rell, Lo Key	J'Rell	4:10
9.	"The Moon" (featuring Neil deGrasse Tyson)	Johnson, Neil deGrasse Tyson	GMJR, Alexander Plummer	4:10
10.	"We Go Together Now"	Johnson	GMJR, Elijah Y. Whittingham	4:19
11.	"Sunrise Serenade" (featuring BLAQGxLD and Chris Theory)	Johnson, Hyn	Chris Theory	5:09
12.	"Simple Things"	Johnson	J. Troy	3:43

== Personnel ==
Credits adapted from liner notes.

- Marsha Ambrosius – arrangement, composition, vocal production
- Blaqgxld – vocals
- BLAQSMURPH – instrumentation, production, programming
- Christopher Bradley – composition, instrumentation, production, programming
- Gwen Bunn – synthesizer
- Dan Cohen – engineering
- Payge Cooper – drums
- Phil Cornish – keyboards, production
- Cyrus Deshield – composition
- Blake Eiseman – mixing
- Gmjr – instrumentation, production, programming
- Terence Harper – trumpet
- Rod Harris – guitar
- Rod Harris, Jr. – guitar
- Frank Houston – saxophone
- The Husel – composition, vocals
- Willie Hyn – composition, vocals
- J'rell – composition, engineering, instrumentation, production, programming
- Donovan Jarvis – keyboards
- Jimmy Jones – trombone
- Colin Leonard – mastering
- Alexander Lloyd – composition
- Lo Key – composition
- David Luke – production, synthesizer
- Sean Mack – artwork
- Julian McGuire – guitar
- Musiq Soulchild – arrangement, composition, cover art concept, executive production, instrumentation, production, programming, vocals, vocal arrangement, vocal production
- Alexander Plummer – instrumentation, production, programming
- Doobie Powell – instrumentation, production, programming
- Campbellson Shackleton – composition
- Leo Sibilly – engineering
- June Summers – composition
- Chris Theory – vocal arrangement
- Jonathan Troy – bass, instrumentation, production, programming
- Neil deGrasse Tyson – composition
- Max Unruh – engineering assistance
- Elijah Y. Whittingham – instrumentation, production, programming
- Geremy Wimbush – drums

== Charts ==
Chart (2017)	Peak position
US Billboard 200	126
