= Lorene Cary =

American novelist (born 1956)

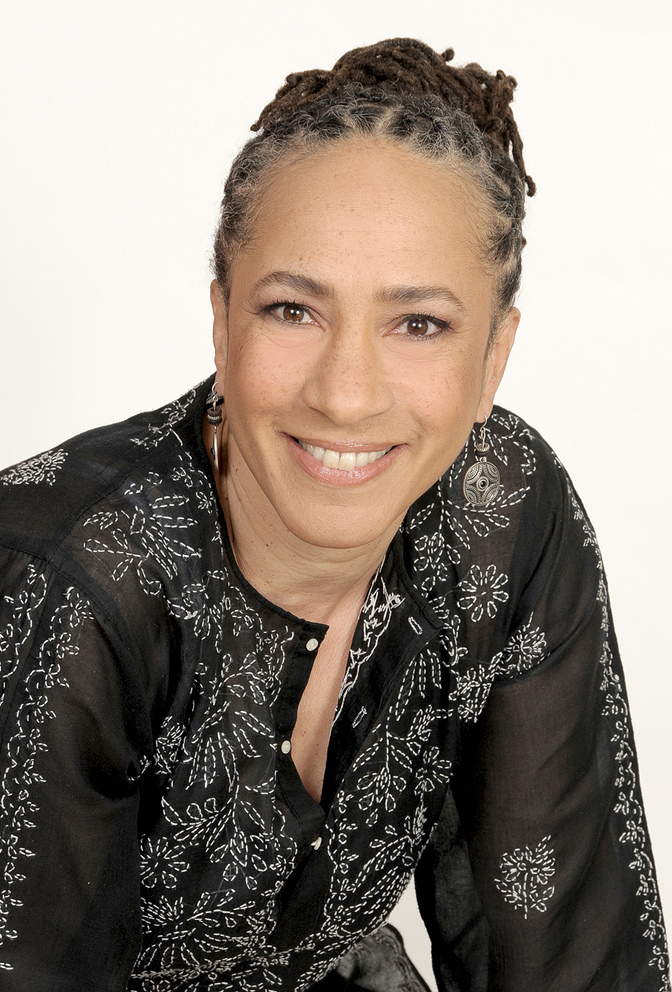
- Cary in 2006
- Born: 1956 (age 69–70); Philadelphia, Pennsylvania, U.S.
- Education: St. Paul's School; University of Pennsylvania; University of Sussex
- Occupations: Author; writer; educator; social activist
- Writing career
- Period: 1988–present
- Genres: Memoir, novel, historical novel
- Subject: African-American experience
- Notable work: Black Ice
- Website: lorenecary.org

Lorene Cary (born 1956) is an American author, educator and social activist.

== Biography ==
Cary grew up in a working-class neighborhood in Philadelphia, Pennsylvania. In 1972, she was invited to the elite St. Paul's boarding school in New Hampshire, on scholarship, entering in St. Paul's second year of co-education as one of the fewer than ten African-American female students. She spent two years at St. Paul's, graduating in 1974. She earned an undergraduate degree and her MA from the University of Pennsylvania in 1978.

She was awarded a Thouron Fellowship, enabling her to study at Sussex University in the United Kingdom, where she received an MA in Victorian literature.

After finishing college, Cary worked in publishing for several magazines, including Time, TV Guide, and Newsweek. She also worked as a freelance writer for Essence, American Visions, Mirabella, Obsidian, and the Philadelphia Inquirer. In 1982, Cary returned to St. Paul's as a teacher. She is currently a senior lecturer in creative writing at the University of Pennsylvania.

== Literary career ==
After writing a 1988 article about her experience at St. Paul's, she published a longer memoir, Black Ice, which was published in 1991 by Alfred A. Knopf. Phillip Lopate, reviewing the book for The New York Times called it a "stunning memoir". The book, "bruisingly honest about class, race and sex in America", found success with the critics and was shortlisted the same year by The New York Times as "summer reading." Her first book, it was published in paperback the next year by Vintage Books.

In 1995, Cary published her first novel, The Price of a Child. It is based on the escape of Jane Johnson, a slave from North Carolina who escaped to freedom with her two sons while briefly in Philadelphia with her master and his family.

Set in 1855, the novel tells the story of Ginnie Pryor, a slave from a Virginia plantation who is bought by the US Ambassador to Nicaragua. En route with her new owner to New York City, for their voyage to South America, she escapes via the Underground Railroad and works to build a new life in Philadelphia. Fernanda Eberstadt, reviewing the novel in The New York Times, commented that Cary "is a powerful storyteller, frankly sensual, mortally funny, gifted with an ear for the pounce and ragged inconsequentiality of real speech and an eye for the shifts and subterfuges by which ordinary people get by".

In 1998, Cary published a second novel, Pride, which explores the experiences of four contemporary black middle-class women.

Cary's first Young Adult book, FREE!, was a collection of non-fiction accounts related to the Underground Railroad, and published by Third World Press/New City Press in 2005. Cary said she believes these 12 stories of daring escapes "allow our 21st-century minds to imagine actively the inner lives of enslaved people – and put ourselves in their places, not with shame, but compassion and respect."

Cary wrote the script for the videos of The President's House: Freedom and Slavery in the Making of a New Nation, a 2010 exhibition in The President's House in Philadelphia.

In 2011, Cary published her third novel If Sons, Then Heirs. It is a contemporary story of family, race, and the challenges of reconciling the present with a persistent past. Alonzo Rayne was raised in South Carolina by his great-grandmother, Selma. Now he owns a construction business in Philadelphia and lives with Lillie, a single mom, and her seven-year-old son, Khalil. As the story begins, Alonzo goes to South Carolina to urge the aging Selma to sell her land, in order to pay for her long-term care. But she hasn't owned the land since King, her husband, died almost 50 years before. Selma was King's second wife, not an heir. Racist inheritance laws also left her dispossessed. Alonzo's mother contacts him, wanting to reconnect years after having abandoned him. Her marriage to a white man has turned her life around. Finally, Alonzo's investigation into his great-grandmother's land puts him on a collision course with the men who killed his great-grandfather.

Says Carleen Brice, author of Orange Mint and Honey and Children of the Waters, "Every single character pops off the page in this amazing story. This masterwork of a novel made me laugh and cry out loud. Important, enjoyable, and wonderfully moving. An absolute delight."

== Art Sanctuary ==
In 1998 Cary founded Art Sanctuary, an African-American arts and letters organization devoted to presenting regional and national talent in the literary, visual and performing arts. Art Sanctuary annually hosts an African American arts festival, during which writers discuss their work with up to 1,500–2,000 students, and another 2,000–3,000 people participate in panels, workshops, the basketball tournament, teachers' symposium, Family Pavilion, main stage, and other events.
