= 13th Transgender Erotica Awards =

US adult entertainment industry award

- Date: March 7, 2021
- Site: Online on PornHub
- Hosted by: Domino Presley

Highlights
- Best Film: Tranimals – Lena Moon (Evil Angel)
- Most awards: Casey Kisses and Daisy Taylor (3 each)
- Most nominations: Emma Rose (7)

The 13th Annual Transgender Erotica Awards was a scheduled pornographic awards event recognizing the best in transgender pornography from the previous year from October 2, 2019 to October 31, 2020. Pre-nominations were open from November 3 to November 13, 2020.

The public-at-large was able to suggest nominees using an online form. Nominees were announced on December 24, 2020, online on the theteashow.com website or 16 awards, with the following awards having the winner announced without nominees;Transcendence Award, Lifetime Achievement Award, Gender X Model of the Year, Kink's Kinkiest TGirl Domme, Black-TGirls.com Model of the Year, Chaturbate TS Performer of the Year, Pornhub Model of the Year, The Fan Choice Award voting is opened in 2021, with the winners announced after public nominations and voting.

== Winners and nominees ==
The nominations for the 13th Transgender Erotica Awards were announced online on December 24, 2020, online on the theteashow.com website. The winners are scheduled to be announced during the awards on March 7, 2021. On December 4, 2020, it was announced that the award show would be held as an online production and on February 9, 2021, it was announced the ceremony would be broadcast on Pornhub. The awards were presented with winners notified in advance after signing non-disclosure agreements. Each winner gave a pre-recorded acceptance speech. Award trophies were mailed out to recipients after the award show was broadcast.

=== Awards ===
Winners are listed first, highlighted in boldface.

Best New Face	Best Transman Model
**Emma Rose**; Adelaide Rose; Akaya Prime; Aubrey; Avril Vixxxen; Bambi Bliss; Bella Bates; Clara Belle; Cleo Wynter; Eden Rose; Eva Maxim; Evie Envy; Izzy Wilde; Jade Venus; Jessi Sunshine; Gracie Jane; Lexi; Libbey Harper; Natalie Stone; Pixi Lust; Tori Easton; Valeria Atreides; Viola Costa; Zaza Zariaa	**Stevie Trixx**; Eddie Wood; Ari Koyote; Logan Knight; Rory J.; Jordan Green; Austin Spears; Leo Mercury; Trip Richards; Xander James; Luke Hudson; Billy Vega; Izzy Akino; Viktor Belmont
Best Solo Model	Best Hardcore Model
**Jasmine Lotus**; Angelina Please; Bubbles; Cassandra Lovelox; Crystal Thayer; Daisy Taylor; Emma Rose; Holly Strokes; Izzy Wilde; Janie Blade; Joss Amor; Kellie Shaw; Korra Del Rio; Lianna Lawson; Melanie Brooks; Natalee Skye; Nicole Knight; Nikki Jade Taylor; Salina Samone	**Daisy Taylor**; Alexa Scout; Angelina Please; Aubrey Kate; Bubbles; Casey Kisses; Chelsea Marie; Cherry Mavrik; Crystal Thayer; Emma Rose; Erica Cherry; Foxxy; Izzy Wilde; Jasmine Lotus; Jenna Gargles; Khloe Kay; Lena Moon; Lianna Lawson; Lily Demure; Melanie Brooks; Natalie Mars; Natalie Stone; Peachez; Robin Banks; Roxxie Moth; Ryder Monroe; Salina Samone; Shiri Allwood
Best International Model	Ms. Unique
**Evie Envy**; Avril Vixxxen; Bailey Paris; Bambi Harper; Bibi Red; Coco; Estelle Mounty; Fernanda Gorgeous; Icy Diamond; Laska; Lizandra Reyes; Marissa Minx; Melissa Dawn; Mia Maffia; Mia Puig; Valentina Mary; Yulia Masakowa	**Aspen Brooks**; Bella Vie; Brandi Bangz; Claire Tenebrarum; Dahlia Crimson; Demii D Best; Eclair Alyson; Janie Blade; Jenna Gargles; Jessy Bells; Kimber Haven; Mya Nine; Nyxi Leon; Roxxie Moth; Sofia Sanders; Summer Rayne; Viola Costa
Best Self-Producer	Cam Performer of the Year
**Natalie Mars**; Casey Kisses; Claire Tenebrarum; Crystal Thayer; Daisy Taylor; Emma Rose; Eclair Alyson; Jamie French; Jasmine Lotus; Kelly Quell; Kendall Penny; Kimber Haven; Kylie Maria; Roxxie Moth; Shiri Allwood; Vannialll	**Casey Kisses**; Andylynn Payne; Jessica Fappit; Natalee Skye; Nicole Knight; Nikki Jade Taylor; Rachel Nova; Roxxie Moth; Shiri Allwood; Sophie Kate
Best BBW Performer	Best DVD
**Naomi Moan**; Adriana Gonzalez; Clara Belle; Joceline; Kindred Skeleton; Madame Morgan; Nathalie Presley; Ryhan Rose; Sophia Presley	**Tranimals – Lena Moon** (Evil Angel); Buddy Wood's Hollywood Transsexuals – Buddy Wood (Grooby); Grooby's Poolboy Adventures – Buddy Wood (Grooby); Natalie: Angel Unveiled (TransAngels); Raw Vol. 1 – Adam Christopher (Transglamour); Personal Series – Adam Christopher (Transglamour); Trans Babysitters 2 – Jim Powers (Gender X); Trans Brides – Jim Powers (Gender X); TransFer Students – Jim Powers (Gender X); Trans BDSM – Jim Powers (Gender X); Some TS Like it Hot – Ricky Greenwood (Transsensual); The Smut Peddlers – Sadie Lola (Kink); Take a Ride on the Trans Train (Devil's Film); Tgirls Porn Volume 19 – Radius Dark (Grooby); The TransAngels Motorcycle Club (TransAngels); Transfixed Volume 6 – Bree Mills (Adult Time); Translust 3 – Aiden Starr (Evil Angel); TS Factor 12 – Joey Silvera (Evil Angel); TS Girls on Top Volume 4 – Ricky Greenwood (Transsensual); TS Taboo Vol. 4: Cheating Wives – Ricky Greenwood (Transsensual); TS Hardcore All-Stars #2 – Radius Dark (Grooby); TS I'm a Big Girl Now – Jim Powers (Gender X); Transsexual Fitness – Jim Powers (Gender X)
Best Girl/Girl Scene	Best Boy/Girl Scene
**Korra Del Rio, Ella Hollywood, and Jenna Creed – Take a Ride on the Trans Train** (Devil's Films); Chelsea Marie and Izzy Wilde – Tgirls.porn (Grooby); Claire Tenebrarum and Roxxie Moth – Transglamour Raw Vol 1; The Subletter – Casey Kisses and Maya Kendrick (Kink); The Audition – Korra Del Rio and Bunny Colby (Kink); Greedy Latex Slut – Ella Hollywood and Dresden (Kink); Worship Khloe – Khloe Kay and Helena Locke (Kink); Kellie Shaw and Nicole Knight – Tgirls.porn (Grooby); Khloe Kay and Andylynn Payne – TS Factor 12 (Evil Angel); Melanie Brooks and Diamond Caine – Tgirls.porn (Grooby); Erica Cherry and Robin Banks – Tgirls.porn (Grooby); Lena Moon and Chanel Preston – TS Love Stories (Transsensual); Natalie Mars and Jenna Foxx – TS Girls on Top 4 (Transsensual); Daisy Taylor and Alisia Rae – Bitch Craft (Trans Angels)	**Daisy Taylor and Dante Colle – Grooby Girls** (Grooby); Aubrey Kate and Wesley Woods – TS Taboo 4: Cheating Wives (Transsensual); Casey Kisses and Pierce Paris – Trans Lust 2 (Evil Angel); Crystal Thayer Gets a Cream Pie – GroobyGirls (Grooby); Evie Envy's First Ever Hardcore – Canada Tgirl (Grooby); Eva Maxim and Dante Colle – Transgressions BDSM (Gender X); Emma Rose and Draven Navarro – Trans-fer Students (Gender X); H3ll4SL00tz and Claire Tenebrarum – Extasis (Kink); Foxxy and Draven Navarro – TS Hot Wives (Transsensual); Jenna Gargles, Dana DeArmond, and Dante Colle – Translust 3 (Evil Angel); Lianna Lawson and Dominique Pacifico – Bad Little Bitch (Kink); Sarina Valentina, Ella Hollywood, and H3ll4SL00tz – Tranimals (Evil Angel); Shiri Allwood and Sean Michaels – Transcendent (Evil Angel); Lena Moon 4 on 1 (Legal Porno); Laid Bare – Natalie Mars and Sebastian Keys (Kink); Jade Venus – The Whore Next Door – GroobyVR (Grooby); Jasmine Lotus Gets a Cream Pie – Tgirls.xxx (Grooby); Natalie Mars – Busted Tgirls (Legal Porno); Natalie Stone's Hardcore Graduation – GroobyGirls (Grooby); Natalee Skye Fucked Hard – GroobyGirls (Grooby); Ryder Monroe, Jenna Gargles and Wolf Hudson – Take a Ride on the Trans Train (Devil's Films); Emma Rose and Chris Epic – Grooby's Poolboy Adventures (Grooby)
Best Producer	Best Internet Personality
**Buddy Wood**; Adam Christopher; Aiden Starr; Damazo; Dave Khull; Fivestar; Jack Flash; Jim Powers; Joey Silvera; Kelly Quell and Xena Kitty; KilaKali; Omar Wax; Radius Dark; Ricky Greenwood; Sadie Lola; Sebastian Keys; Sex Tape Creator; ShinyboundSluts; Teodor Grekov; Vee Soho	**Domino Presley**; Aubrey Kate; Bella Marasalco; Claire Tenebrarum; Clara Belle; Crystal Thayer; Daisy Taylor; Emma Rose; Izzy Wilde; Jamie French; Jojo Hunt; Kendall Penny; Lena Moon; Naomi Moan; Natassia Dreams; Nicole Knight; Nikola Ophan; Robin Banks; Ryder Monroe; Sophia Presley
Best Non-TS Female Performer	Best Non-TS Male Performer
**Dana DeArmond**; Adriana Chechik; Alura Jenson; Arabelle Raphael; Charlotte Sartre; Dee Williams; Ella Nova; Jenna Foxx; Joanna Angel; Kacie Castle; Kylie Le Beau; Lindsey Love; Lydia Black; Nadia White; Robin Coffins	**Dante Colle**; Adonis Couverture; Chris Epic; Christian XXX; Dillon Diaz; Draven Navarro; H3II4SLOOtz; Lance Hart; Miquel Duque; Sean Michaels; Smash Thompson; Soldier Boi; Vinnie O'Neillv
Best VR Scene	PornHub Model of the Year
**Porn and Chill – Crystal Thayer and Chris Epic** (GroobyVR)	**Daisy Taylor** (Female) **Ayden** (Male)
Kinkiest Tgirl Domme	Gender X Model of the Year
**Casey Kisses**	**Emma Rose**
Black TGirls Model of the Year	Fan Choice Award
**Peachez**	**Khloe Kay**
Transcendence Award	Chaturbate's Ts Performer of the Year
**Foxxy**	**Casey Kisses**
Lifetime Achievement
**Venus Lux** and **Jessica Fox**
