= 12th Transgender Erotica Awards =

US adult entertainment industry award

- Date: March 15, 2020 (original); May 10, 2020 (rescheduled)
- Site: Avalon Hollywood, California (original); Online on grooby247.com (rescheduled)
- Hosted by: Domino Presley

Highlights
- Best Film: 'TransNasty' – Lena Kelly (Evil Angel) 'Transfixed Vol 3' – Bree Mills (Adult Time) [Tie]
- Most awards: Lena Kelly (3)
- Most nominations: Natalie Mars and Daisy Taylor (8 each)

The 12th Annual Transgender Erotica Awards was a pornographic awards event recognizing the best in transgender pornography form the previous year from November 16, 2018 – October 1, 2019. Pre-nominations were open from October 2 to October 16, 2019. The public-at-large was able to suggest nominees using an online form. Nominees were announced on January 3, 2020, online on the theteashow.com website, with fan voting opening on the same day. The eligibility period for the fan award was 1 January to 31 December 2019. The awards open to fan voting were the fan award which was open to all and site-specific awards which were open to members of the forums of the specific sites who met specific criteria regarding; a number of postings and a date to have been a member before. The winners were announced during the webcast on May 10, 2020.

== Rescheduling of event ==
The TEA's were originally scheduled to be hosted by Domino Presley at the Avalon Hollywood of March 15, 2020. On March 12 as a result of legal advice following restriction in place on events in excess of 250 people being recommended to be cancelled by Governor of California Gavin Newsom, the event was indefinitely postponed, as a result of the Avalon cancelling all events in March 2020. On April 20, 2020, it was announced that the award show would be held as an online production, broadcast for free on grooby247.com. The awards were presented with winners notified in advance after signing non-disclosure agreements. Each winner gave a pre-recorded acceptance speech. Award trophies were mailed out to recipients after the award show was broadcast.

== Winners and nominees ==
The nominations for the 12th Transgender Erotica Awards were announced online on January 3, 2020, and fan voting opened on the same day, when pre-nominations closed, online on the theteashow.com website. The originally scheduled to be announced during the awards on March 15, 2020, but were later publicly announced on May 10, 2020, during the pre-recorded webcast.

=== Awards ===
Winners are listed first, highlighted in boldface.

Best New Face	Best Transman Model
**Luna Love**; Andrea Zhay; Angelina Please; Aubrey Leigh; Claire Tenebrarum; Ella Hollywood; Erica Cherry; Jasmine Lotus; Jojo Hunt; Kasey Kei; Kendall Vuitton; Lizbeth Kyo; Nicole Knight; Rachel Nova; Sharnell Dupree; Sofia Bun	**Bunny Hughes**; Bearlycare; Imdash; Jacques Horror; Kinxston Foxxx; Logan Knight; Olly Jackson; Reconxxx; Rudeboyroman; Sly Fawkes; Stevie Trixx; TJGrey123; Tommy Tanner; Trip Richards; Viktor Belmont; Yoshiwara Niisan
Best Solo Model	Best Hardcore Model
**Casey Kisses**; Alexa Scout; Cherry Mavrik; Crystal Thayer; Daisy Taylor; Ella Venus; Jasmine Lotus; Jenna Gargles; Kendall Penny; Kendall Vuitton; Khloe Kay; Korra Del Rio; Nicole Knight; Robin Banks; Ryder Monroe; Shiri Allwood	**Natalie Mars**; Alexa Scout; Aspen Brooks; Aubrey Kate; Casey Kisses; Chelsea Marie; Daisy Taylor; Domino Presley; Ella Hollywood; Jessy Bells; Kayleigh Coxx; Khloe Kay; Lena Kelly; Lianna Lawson; Luna Love; Melanie Brooks; Nyxi Leon; Shiri Allwood
Best International Model	Ms. Unique
**Marissa Minx**; Alexandra Berkutova; Alice Blitz; Alina Wang; Alisa Koma; Bianca Reis; Ella Venus; Fernanda Marques; Jessica Doll; Julia Epiphany; Natasha Swift; Nikki Vicious; Sasha de Sade; Yasmin Dornelles; Yulia Masakowa	**Ally Sparkles**; Aeva Rhone; Alex Raven; Chelsea Kos; Demii Best; Isa la Crux; Gina James; Kelly Quell; Kerri LaBouche; Kira Crash; Jacquie Blu; Jessica Fappit; Lily Demona; Lizzy Red; Lycha; Mara Nova; Salina Samone
Best Self-Producer	Cam Performer of the Year
**Shiri Allwood**; Chelsea Kos; Kasey Kei; Kelly Quell; Kendall Penny; Kerri LaBouche; Kimber Haven; Ivory Mayhem; Lena Kelly; Lianna Lawson; Libbey Harper; Lilly Demona; Natalie Mars; Raven Babe; Raven Roxx; Sarina Havok; Sasha De Sade; Sophia Presley; Sophie Ladder; Vica TS; Wendy Williams	**Casey Kisses**; Althea Foxxx; Andylynn Payne; Ariel Hunter; Aubrey Kate; Eevee Bee; Kelly Pierce; Kendall Penny; Janie Blade; Jasmine Lotus; Liberty Harkness; Nicole Knight; Roxxie Moth; Shiri Allwood; Vanniall; Vica TS
Best DVD	Best VR
'**TransNasty' – Lena Kelly** (Evil Angel) and '**Transfixed Vol 3' – Bree Mills** (Adult Time) [Tie]; 'Control Her'– Tom Moore (TransAngels); 'Coven' – Domino Presley (Grooby); 'Florida Road Trip #10' – Jack Flash (Grooby); 'My Best Friends TS Girlfriend' – Ricky Greenwood (Transsensual); 'My TS Stepsister 3' – Ricky Greenwood (Transsensual); 'Slag Angels on Wheels' – Sadie Lola (Kink); 'Tgirls Porn #17' – Radius Dark (Grooby); 'This TS Life #2' – Aiden Starr (Evil Angel); **TransConfessions** – (Transerotica); 'Trans Glam' – Jonni Darkko (Evil Angel); 'Transational Fantasies 8' – Sammi Mancini (Transational Fantasies); 'Transational Fantasies 10' – Sammi Manicini (Transational Fantasies); 'Trans Pool Party #2' – Jim Powers (GenderX); 'Trans-slyvania' – Jim Powers (GenderX)	**Ella Hollywood – Little Slut Face** (Grooby VR); Amber Violet – Taste Me Instead (TS Virtual Lovers); Claire T – Spreading the Good Word (Grooby VR); Daisy Taylor – Deep Inside Daisy Taylor (Grooby VR); Ella Hollywood – Little Slut Face (Grooby VR); Jenna Gargles – Miss Me? (Grooby VR); Jessy Bells – Self Suck/Hard Fuck (Grooby VR); Luna Love – Cheating With My Neighbour (Grooby VR); Natassia Dreams – Naughty Wellness (TS Virtual Lovers); Nicole Knight – Next Door Nympho (Grooby VR); Yulia Masakowa – The Co-Workers Cock (TS Virtual Lovers)
Best Girl/Girl Scene	Best Boy/Girl Scene
**Aspen Brooks and Khloe Kay – Tgirls.porn** – Grooby – Radius Dark; Alexa Scout and Robin Banks – Tgirls.porn – Grooby – Radius Dark; Aspen Brooks and Khloe Kay – Tgirls.porn – Grooby – Radius Dark; Aubrey Kate and Angela White – TransGlam – Jonni Darkko – Evil Angel; Belle Adams and Jojo Hunt – Tgirls.porn – Grooby – Omar Wax; Casey Kisses and Charlotte Sartre – Noisy Nympho Neighbour – Kink – Sadie Lola; Chelsea Marie and Angelina Please – Tgirls.porn – Grooby – Radius Dark; Jessy Dubai and Dana DeArmond – An Experienced Woman 2 – TransAngels – Tom Moore; Natalie Mars and Charlotte Sartre – The Lab Rat – Kink – Mona Wales; Raven Roxx and Ryley – Tgirl Girl Space Pirates – Bad Girl Maffia; Ryder Monroe and Jordan Taylor – Family Transformation – Gender X – Jim Powers	**Daisy Taylor and Jordan Taylor – Family Transformation** – Gender X – Jim Powers; Alexa Scout and Ricky Larkin – Feet in Inches – TransAngels – Tom Moore; Aspen Brooks and Mason Lear – Pluck You Budd – TransAngels – Tom Moore; Aubrey Kate and Cody Carter – Trans-Slyvania – Gender X – Jim Powers; Casey Kisses and Lance Hart – A Helping Hand – Transsensual – Ricky Greenwood; Daisy Taylor and H3II4SL00TZ – Daisy's Devotion – Kink – Sadie Lola; Jane Marie – Orgy Scene – Domino Presley's Coven – Grooby – Domino Presley; Jessy Bells and Pierce Paris – Trans School Girls 2 – Gender X – Jim Powers; Kendall Penny and Tony Orlando – Anal Instinct – Kink – Mona Wales; Kimber Haven and Daddy T – T-Girl Space Pirates – Bad Girl Maffia; Korra Del Rio and King Epicleus – Tgirls.xxx – Grooby – Radius Dark; Luna Love and Soldier Boi – GroobyGirls – Grooby – Buddy Wood; Natalie Mars Bukkake – Milky Cat – Milky Cat; Sofia Bun and Smash Thompson – Smashed – Grooby Girls – Jack Flash
Best Producer	Best Internet Personality
**Aiden Starr**; Bree Mills; Buddy Wood; Damien Cain; Dana Vespoli; Dave Krull; Fivestar; Frank; Jack Flash; Jim Powers; Kalin K; Kelly Quell/Xena; Louie Damazo; Mona Wales; Omar Wax; Radius Dark; Ricky Greenwood; Sadie Lola; Tom Moore	**Lena Kelly**; Alexandra Vexx; Aspen Brooks; Chanel Santini; Claire Tenebrarum; Daisy Taylor; Lain Arbor; Liberty Harkness; Natalie Mars; Nicole Knight; Nyxi Leon; Robin Banks; Roxxie Moth; Val Boudreaux; Wendy Williams
Best Non-TS Female Performer	Best Non-TS Male Performer
**Charlotte Sartre**; Adriana Chechik; Alura Jenson; Angela White; Bunny Colby; Cherie DeVille; Dana DeArmond; Dee Williams; Lauren Philips; Lindsey Love; Riley Reyes; Robin Coffins	**Sean Michaels**; Adonis Couverture; Cody Carter; Colby Jansen; Christian XXX; Dante Colle; H3LL4SL00TZ; Epiculeus; Lance Hart; Michael DelRay; Pierce Paris; Ricky Larkin; Smash Thompson; Soldier Boi; Tony Orlando; Will Havoc
PornHub Model of the Year	MV Trans Model of the Year
**Daisy Taylor** (Female), **Trip Richards** (Male); Ashiko; Aubrey Kate; Baby Maxxx; Bailey Jay; Cyd St. Vincent; Kinxston Foxxx; Natalie Mars; Vica TS	**Kendall Penny**; KYLiEMARiA; Natalie Mars; Sophie Ladder; TsBlondieNYC; Caseykisses; Sly Fawkes; Shiri Allwood; Vanniall
Chaturbate's Ts Performer Of The Year	Industry Professional
**Eevee Bee**; Mrs Kelly Pierce; Vica TS; Casey Kisses	**Rabbits Reviews**
Kinkiest Tgirl Domme	BBW Performer Of The Year
**Natalie Mars**	**Sophia Presley**
Fan Choice Award	Transcendence Award
**Lena Kelly**	**Aubrey Kate**
Gender X Model of the Year	Black TGirls Model of the Year
**Khloe Kay**	**Jasmine Lotus**
Lifetime Achievement
**Chelsea Marie** (Performer), **Damien Cain** (Non-Performer), **Danny "Sparky Snakeden" Watters** (Special Edition)
