= MusiqInTheMagiq =

Studio album by Musiq Soulchild
- Released: April 29, 2011
- Recorded: 2009–2011
- Genre: R&B, neo soul
- Length: 44:21
- Label: Atlantic; Soulstar; Soli Ridge
- Producer: Arden "Keyz" Altino, Drumma Boy, Jerry “Wonda” Duplessis, ELEMENT, Victor Greig (exec.), John Legend, The Kaliphat, Lil' Ronnie, MellowMomentum, Musiq Soulchild (also exec.), August Rigo (exec.), Jack Splash, Jesse "Corparal" Wilson

Musiq Soulchild chronology
OnMyRadio (2008)	MusiqInTheMagiq (2011)	Life on Earth (2016)

MusiqInTheMagiq is the sixth studio album by the R&B singer Musiq Soulchild. It was released on April 29, 2011, on Atlantic Records. The album entered the Billboard 200 chart at number eight, selling 34,000 copies in its first week. As of 2016, the album has sold over 111,000 copies.

== Singles ==
No physical singles were released from the album, though two songs came out as iTunes singles, "Anything" and "Yes". The music video for "Anything" was directed by Phillip "Taj" Jackson and was officially released on May 3, 2011, on iTunes.

== Critical reception ==
Professional ratings
Review scores
Source	Rating
About.com	4/5 stars
AllMusic	3.5/5 stars
Okayplayer	(85/100)
PopMatters	4/10 stars

Mark Edward Nero from About.com praised the decision by both the composers and producers to craft more up-tempo tracks that "benefit from marriages between Musiq's soft vocals and bass-and-drum-driven beats." He concluded that, "By blending his trademark starry-eyed romanticism with more urgent musical enthusiasm, Musiq has managed to craft a formula that's resulted in one of the better albums of his career so far." AllMusic's Andy Kellman said that the record "does not stray far from Musiq's past but features some developments, such as the singer's increased comfort with falsetto deployment ("Sayido," "Waitingstill") and a charming mid-'60s soul throwback ("Love Contract")." He gave notable praise to the final track "Likethesun" for having Musiq's best vocal performance over "stop-start percussion patterns and swarming synthesizers", saying he should do more of that style in later projects. PopMatters contributor David Amidon found the album "pretty bland and uninspiring", criticizing the production choices in beats and vocals, and the lyricism feeling thin on tracks like "Single" and "Anything", concluding that "Little hints of Musiq's talents crop up here and there on MusiqInTheMagiq, but they're too few and far between to really recommend your cash come Musiq's way this time."

== Track listing ==
Standard edition
No.	Title	Writer(s)	Producer(s)	Length
1.	"Anything" (featuring Swizz Beatz)	Taalib Johnson, Jerry Duplessis, Arden Altino, August Rigo, Kasseem Dean, Linton Beckles, Lipson Francis, Roy Anthony Carter	Jerry “Wonda” Duplessis, Arden "Keyz" Altino (co.)	3:51
2.	"Single"	Johnson, Ronnie Jackson, Philip Cornish	Lil' Ronnie	4:05
3.	"Sayido"	Johnson, Duplessis, Altino, Rigo, Dana Stinson	Jerry "Wonda" Duplessis, Rockwilder, Arden "Keyz" Altino (co.)	3:10
4.	"Lovecontract"	Hitesh Ceon, Kim Ofstad, Gerrell Gaddis, Tim Blacksmith	ELEMENT	3:13
5.	"Silver&Gold"	Johnson, Duplessis, John Stephens, Altino, Rigo	Jerry "Wonda" Duplessis, John Legend, Arden "Keyz" Altino (co.)	3:24
6.	"Waitingstill"	Johnson, Duplessis, Altino, Christopher Gholson, Rigo	Jerry "Wonda" Duplessis, Drumma Boy, Arden "Keyz" Altino (co.)	3:52
7.	"Backtowhere"	Johnson, Duplessis, Altino, R. Jackson, Rigo	Jerry "Wonda" Duplessis, Lil' Ronnie, Arden "Keyz" Altino (co.)	3:38
8.	"Do We Have To"	Johnson, Jesse Wilson	Jesse "Corparal" Wilson	3:26
9.	"Befriends"	Johnson, Jack Splash, Phillip "Taj" Jackson	Jack Splash	3:42
10.	"Yes"	Ceon, Ofstad, Claude Kelly	ELEMENT	3:41
11.	"Medicine"	Johnson, Carl Adams	MellowMomentum	3:57
12.	"Likethesun"	Johnson, Wilson	Jesse "Corparal" Wilson, The Kaliphat	4:23
Total length:				44:21

=== Deluxe edition ===
Deluxe edition bonus tracks
No.	Title	Writer(s)	Producer(s)	Length
13.	"Clumsylove"	Ceon, Ofstad, Rigo	ELEMENT	3:12
14.	"Goodgirl"	Johnson, R. Jackson, Cornish	Lil' Ronnie	3:16
Total length:				50:49

iTunes edition
No.	Title	Director(s)	Length
15.	"Anything" (Music video)	Phillip "Taj" Jackson	3:52
Total length:			54:41

• (co.) Co-producer

Notes

Premium edition includes:

- deluxe edition CD with bonus tracks;
- 18" x 18" MusiqInTheMagiq poster — autographed for the first 250 customers;
- full album stream session 72 hours before release date;
- immediate MP3 download of "Anything".

== Personnel ==
Credits for MusiqInTheMagiq adapted from Allmusic. Writers listed at track listing section.

=== Musicians ===
- Eddie Allen – trumpet
- Arden "Keyz" Altino – Fender Rhodes, keyboards, producer, synthesizer strings
- Nerva Altino – piano
- Kafele Bandele – horn
- Obed Calvaire – drums, percussion
- Mike DeSalvo – engineer
- Charissa Dowe – violin
- Keith "Lil Wonda" Duplessis – keyboards
- Mark "Lace" Gibbs – percussion
- Wayne Jeffrey – acoustic guitar
- James Lewis – guitar
- Eli Menezes – guitar, percussion
- Joseph Prielzony – strings
- Anthony Reyes – bass guitar, guitar
- Gabe Robles – assistant
- Jay Rodriguez – baritone saxophone
- Mark Williams – trombone
- Andrew Yu – cello
- Hitesh Ceon & Kim Ofstad – all instruments on tracks produced by ELEMENT
- Carl "MellowMomentum" Adams – all instruments on tracks produced by MellowMomentum

=== Production ===
- Carl "MellowMomentum" Adams – producer
- Warren Babson – engineer
- Nick Bilardello – art direction, design, illustrations
- Hitesh Ceon (of ELEMENT) – instrumentation, producer, vocal producer
- Kris Clark – assistant
- Jerry "Wonda" Duplessis – producer
- Zvi Edelman – A&R
- Lanre Gaba – A&R
- Moses Gallart – engineer
- Chris Gehringher – mastering
- Christopher "Drumma Boy" Gholson – producer
- Guerby Girault – assistant
- Rob Gold – art manager
- Victor Greig – executive producer
- Koby Hass – assistant, engineer, percussion
- Ronnie "Lil' Ronnie" Jackson – producer
- Taalib "Musiq Soulchild" Johnson – executive producer, vocal producer
- The Kaliphat – producer
- Claude Kelly – vocal producer
- Glen Marchese – engineer, mixing
- Masa – Illustrations
- Kevin Matela – assistant
- Clint Nelson – assistant, engineer
- Sheryl Nields – photography
- Mitchell O'Brien – assistant
- Kim Ofstad (of ELEMENT) – instrumentation, producer, vocal producer
- Geno Regist – engineer
- August Rigo – executive producer, vocals
- Nick Roache – engineer
- Nick Romei – package manager
- Kevin Schinstock – assistant, engineer
- Jack Splash – arranger, producer
- John Stephens (aka John Legend) – producer
- Dana "Rockwilder" Stinson – producer
- Sergio "Sergical" Tsai – engineer
- Tai Tsosie – assistant
- Mario Velazquez – assistant
- Billy Villane – assistant, engineer
- Jesse "Corparal" Wilson – producer
- Kevin "Kev-O" Wilson – assistant

== Charts ==
=== Weekly charts ===
Chart (2011)	Peak position
US Billboard 200	8
US Top R&B/Hip-Hop Albums (Billboard)	3

=== Year-end charts ===
Chart (2011)	Position
US Top R&B/Hip-Hop Albums (Billboard)	68

== Release history ==
Country	Date	Format	Label	Edition
Canada	April 29, 2011	Digital download	WEA International	Standard
Canada	May 3, 2011	Digital download	WEA International	Deluxe
Japan	April 29, 2011	Digital download	WEA International	Standard
Japan	May 3, 2011	Digital download	WEA International	Deluxe
United States	April 29, 2011	Digital download	Atlantic	Standard
United States	May 3, 2011	Digital download	Atlantic	Deluxe
United States	May 3, 2011	CD	Atlantic	Standard
