= Life on Earth (Musiq Soulchild album) =

Studio album by Musiq Soulchild
- Released: April 15, 2016
- Recorded: 2014–2016; The Corner Studios; Noyo, California; Castle Hill Studios; Atlanta, Georgia
- Genre: R&B, neo soul
- Length: 48:52
- Label: eOne, My Block
- Producer: Warryn Campbell, Musiq Soulchild (also exec.), KC & Cooper

Musiq Soulchild chronology
MusiqInTheMagiq (2011)	Life on Earth (2016)	Feel the Real (2017)

Professional ratings
Review scores
Source	Rating
Philadelphia Inquirer	3/4 stars
Allmusic	3.5/5 stars

Life on Earth is the seventh studio album by American R&B singer-songwriter Musiq Soulchild. It was released on April 15, 2016, by eOne Music. It is the first album to be released on an independent label, after previously recording several albums on Def Jam Recordings and Atlantic Records. The album entered the US Billboard 200 at number 27.

== Background ==
After finishing out his contract with Atlantic Records for the release of his 2011's album MusiqInTheMagiq, Musiq signed with Warryn Campbell's record label My Block Records. However, in June 2014, he emerged as a rapper under the pseudonym The Husel. At the time, he planned to release an album under the name, with guest appearances from Pastor Troy, T-Pain, Bone Crusher and Cash Out, among others. He later released the project as a free EP with five songs. The move caused Musiq to receive heavy amounts of criticism on Twitter. During the backlash, he defended his career change, saying it was primarily due to the change in the music landscape where R&B music's popularity has waned.

== Track listing ==
Standard edition
No.	Title	Writer(s)	Producer(s)	Length
1.	"Wait a Minute" (featuring Willie Hyn)	Taalib Johnson; Ursula Yancy; William Carson; Warryn Campbell	Campbell	5:06
2.	"Who Really Loves You"	Johnson; Campbell	Campbell	3:52
3.	"Heart Away"	Johnson; Campbell	Campbell	3:34
4.	"Loving You"	Johnson; Campbell; Ursula Yancy; Raphael Saadiq	Campbell	3:38
5.	"I Do"	Johnson; Campbell; Ursula Yancy	Campbell; Johnson	4:18
6.	"Changed My Mind"	Johnson; Campbell	Campbell; Johnson	3:43
7.	"Walk Away"	Johnson; Campbell	Campbell; Johnson	4:14
8.	"Far Gone" (featuring Rapsody)	Johnson; Campbell; Marlanna Evans	Campbell; Johnson	5:32
9.	"Part of Me" (featuring JoiStaRR)	Johnson; Campbell; Joi Campbell	Campbell; Johnson	3:19
10.	"Alive and Well"	Johnson; Campbell	Campbell; Johnson	3:29
11.	"The Girl" (featuring JoiStaRR)	Johnson; Joi Campbell; Shawn Cooper; KC Knight	Johnson; KC Knight; Cooper	4:02
12.	"Life on Earth"	Johnson; Campbell; Akelee Relliford	Johnson; Campbell	4:04
Total length:				48:52

Digital download (bonus tracks)
No.	Title	Writer(s)	Producer(s)	Length
13.	"Outer Space"	Johnson; Campbell	Campbell; Johnson	4:04
14.	"Who's to Say"	Johnson; Campbell	Campbell; Johnson	3:55
Total length:				56:51

Target edition (bonus tracks)
No.	Title	Writer(s)	Producer(s)	Length
13.	"I'm Gone"	Johnson; The Husel; Ursula Yancy, Campbell	Campbell; Johnson	3:39
14.	"Game of Love"	Johnson; Campbell	Campbell; Johnson	3:47
Total length:				56:26

== Samples ==
- "Wait A Minute" contains a sample of "Rapper Dapper Snapper", as performed by Edwin Birdsong and "The Champ" by The Mohawks
- "Heart Away" contains a sample of "Don't Change Your Love", as performed by The Five Stairsteps
- "Loving You" contains a sample of "Lovin' You", as performed by Tony! Toni! Toné!

== Personnel ==
Credits adapted from liner notes.

- Musiq Soulchild – primary artist, writer, producer, executive producer, background vocals, vocal production
- Warryn Campbell – producer, writer, instrumentation, executive producer
- Rapsody – additional vocals
- Joi Campbell – writer, additional vocals
- J. Troy – additional instruments and programming
- Alisson Whyld – guitar
- Willie Hyn – additional vocals
- Payge Cooper – drums
- Julian McGuire – guitar
- Rodney Jones, Jr. – bass
- Chris Payton – guitar
- Dontae Winslow – horns, horn arrangement
- Bruce Buechner – recording engineer
- Larry Whitt – assistant engineer
- Dan Cohen – recording engineer
- Leo Sibilly – recording engineer
- Blake Eiseman – mixing
- Colin Leonard – mastering

== Charts ==
=== Weekly charts ===
Chart (2016)	Peak position
US Billboard 200	27
US Top R&B/Hip-Hop Albums (Billboard)	3

=== Year-end charts ===
Chart (2016)	Position
US Top R&B/Hip-Hop Albums (Billboard)	90
