= Diabolic Video =

American pornographic film studio

- Company type: Private
- Industry: Pornography
- Predecessor: Anabolic Video
- Founded: 1998; 28 years ago
- Founder: Gregg Allan & Christopher Alexander
- Headquarters: Chatsworth, California, United States
- Area served: Worldwide
- Key people: Gregg Allan (owner & president)
- Products: Pornographic films
- Services: pay per view, video on demand, video streaming
- Owner: Zero Tolerance Entertainment
- Website: www.diabolic.com

Diabolic Video Productions is an American independent pornographic movie studio headquartered in Chatsworth, California owned by Zero Tolerance Entertainment. The company was originally a sister-studio of Anabolic Video. During their partnership the studios were a pioneer of gonzo pornography, and are considered one of the most successful gonzo producers.

== History ==
Anabolic and Diabolic were originally headquartered in Venice, California for 10 years. Diabolic was founded as a separate label in 1998 by Gregg Allan, and Anabolic Video head Christopher Alexander. Alan had previously run the two companies sales department for 15 years, starting in 1992. On January 15, 1998, Diabolic Video released its first video.

In 2001 Anabolic and Diabolic moved their headquarters to Chatsworth. Vouyer's exit to form Red Light District Video in 2002 eventually led to the mass exodus of 2004, which saw Everhard, Steele and Mike John leave for Red Light, and Dough leave for Devil's Film, where the directors were able to own their own movies.

In May 2007 Anabolic and Diabolic announced they were ending their partnership, and would operate as separate companies. Diabolic would be run and owned by Gregg Alan, who left his post as head of sales at Anabolic. Diabolic Video updated their DVD packaging with a hologram of the Diabolic logo to help establish themselves as a separate brand from Anabolic. They now feature new videos shot in high definition, best-of collections and Blu-ray. By 2007 the company had produced more than 280 films.

In April 2008 Diabolic released its first Blu-ray title, Top Shelf, starring Amy Ried, Courtney Cummz, Jenna Haze, Sarah Vandella, Brianna Love, Audrey Bitoni and Shawna Lenee. It had begun filming in high-definition several years earlier.

== Directors ==
Anabolic and Diabolic originally used to share directors, but with the split that arrangement ended. Current and former Diabolic directors include Sid Knox. In 2007 Melissa Lauren became the studio's first female director, and directed a volume of the Unnatural Sex series. The same year Ricky D resigned from Diabolic to sign a multi-year exclusive contract with Anabolic. He had directed several film series for Diabolic, including Incumming, 2 on 1, Ass For Days and Hot Sauce.

== Distribution deals ==
In June 2006 gamelink.com added the complete Diabolic back-catalogue to its video-on-demand library. The same month it made its content available on AEBN's VOD service.

In March 2007 SugarVOD began adding the complete Diabolic library to its video-on-demand service.

In July 2007 the studio signed an exclusive agreement with Hustler TV to bring worldwide digital distribution of the Diabolic library via Hustler's pay per view and video on demand services.

== Records inspection ==
Diabolic was the target of the first ever records-keeping inspection authorized by the Child Protection and Obscenity Enforcement Act.

In 2006, FBI agents visited the Diabolic office to inspect the records of 23 movies and their performers. Producers of sexual content are mandated to keep specific records under 18 U.S.C. §2257. It was the first ever inspection since the rules requiring records was put into effect in 1988. The investigators did not require a search warrant. Diabolic passed its inspection.

== Awards ==
The following is a selection of some of the major awards Diabolic films have won.

- 2001 AVN Award for 'Best Ethnic-Themed Release' for Panochitas 5
