= Zero Tolerance Entertainment =

American pornographic film studio

- Company type: Private
- Industry: Adult film industry
- Founded: 2002; 24 years ago
- Headquarters: Los Angeles, California, U.S.
- Products: Adult films
- Divisions: Third Degree Films; Black Ice; Diabolic Video
- Website: ztod.com

Zero Tolerance Entertainment is an American independent pornographic film studio. The studios Third Degree Films, Black Ice and Diabolic Video are divisions of Zero Tolerance. The studio's films are generally classed as Gonzo pornography.

== History ==
The company was founded in 2002. The name was chosen because the company pledged to have "zero tolerance for bad porn". The first title ZT released was Who's Your Daddy Part One. In 2005, ZT introduced sister studio Black Ice, which specializes in all-black and interracial content. In 2006, the company filed a lawsuit against AdultsAllowed.com, seeking more than $15 million in damages for copyright infringement. In 2006 the company started including a bonus Spanish language track on all its DVDs, in an attempt to tap into the increasingly important Spanish speaking demographic in the US and Latin America. In 2007, the company signed a deal with Hustler TV to provide its content on the channel in North and South America. In 2008, ZT brought a lawsuit against DVD rental site Movixo Inc., alleging DVD piracy. The case was settled out of court for $15 million. The same year ZT released the first pornographic High-Definition Interactive DVD release, Interactive Sex with Bree Olson.

== Awards ==
- 2005 AVN Award – 'Best Oral-Themed Series' for Blow Me Sandwich
- 2006 AVN Award – 'Best Oral-Themed Feature' for Blow Me Sandwich 7
- 2007 Adam Film World Guide Award – 'Best Interactive Sex Movie' for Interactive Sex With Courtney Cummz
- 2007 Adam Film World Guide Award – 'Best Girl-Girl Vignette Series' for Girlvana 2
- 2007 Adam Film World Guide Award – 'Best 2-On-1 Series' for Double Decker Sandwich
- 2008 AVN Award – 'Best All-Girl Release' for Girlvana 3
- 2008 AVN Award – 'Best Interactive DVD' for Interactive Sex with Jenna Haze
- 2009 AVN Award – 'Best All-Girl Release' for Girlvana 4
- 2013 XBIZ Award Nominee – 'Studio of the Year', 'All-Sex Release of the Year' for Chanel Preston: No Limits and 'All-Sex Series of the Year' for No Limits
