= Third Degree Films =

American pornographic film studio

- Company type: Private
- Industry: Pornography
- Founded: 2002; 24 years ago
- Founder: Joey Wilson
- Headquarters: Los Angeles, California, United States
- Key people: Joey Wilson (President) Miles Long (Director)
- Products: Pornographic films
- Parent: Zero Tolerance Entertainment

Third Degree Films is the umbrella name for the independent American Los Angeles–based heterosexual pornographic film studio Zero Tolerance Entertainment (ZT), both of which produce gonzo pornography.

== History ==
The company was founded in 2002 by Joey Wilson. In 2006, the company filed a lawsuit against AdultsAllowed.com, seeking more than $15 million in damages for copyright infringement. In 2006, the company started including a bonus Spanish language track on all its DVDs, in an attempt to tap into the increasingly important Spanish speaking demographic in the U.S. and Latin America. In 2007, the company signed a deal with Hustler TV to provide its content on the channel in North and South America. In 2008, ZT brought a lawsuit against DVD rental site Movixo Inc., alleging DVD piracy. The case was settled out of court for $15 million.

In 2009, the Film The Cougar Club directed by Miles Long won an AVN Award for Best MILF Release, setting the bar for films of that genre. In 2012, Nylons 8, directed by Miles Long won an AVN Award for Best Foot Fetish/Leg Release Release.

Pat Myne has also been both a performer and director for Third Degree.

== Actresses ==
Actress Courtney Cummz has an exclusive contract with ZT and also directs films for the company. Cummz was the first ZT contract girl.

In 2008, the company signed a six-film deal with Amber Lynn.

Alektra Blue was considered spokesmodel and "unofficial contract girl" for 3rd Degree for around two years, before she became a Wicked Pictures contract star. She also did an interactive sex DVD for 3rd Degree called Total Interactive Control Of Alektra, for which her husband at the time (Pat Myne) was one of the directors.

== Awards ==
- 2012 AVN Award – Best Foot Fetish/Leg Release (Nylons 8)
- 2010 AVN Award – Best Solo Release (All Alone 4)
- 2009 AVN Award – Best MILF Release (The Cougar Club)
- 2012 AVN Award – Best Foot Fetish/Leg Release (Nylons 8)
- 2009 AVN Award – Best MILF Release (The Cougar Club)
