= The Death of Willie Lynch =

Studio album by Black Ice
- Released: September 5, 2006
- Genre: Hip hop
- Label: Koch Records
- Producer: Eric "Booty" Greene

Professional ratings
Review scores
Source	Rating
Allmusic	4/5 stars
Gridface.com	
AllHipHop	3.5/5 stars
Okayplayer	4/5 stars
SpaceCityRock.com	
MVRemix.com	(8.0/10)
RapReviews	(7.0/10)
HipHopGalaxy.com	

The Death of Willie Lynch is the debut album released by Black Ice, an African-American rapper and poet. Although originally signed to Def Jam Records, Black Ice was thankful to have this album released by the indie label Koch Records. Eric "Booty" Greene handled the production for this album.

The title refers to the William Lynch Speech.

== Track listing ==
#	Title	Composer(s)	Guest performer	Producer(s)	Time
1	"The Path"	L. Manson; E. Greene	Black Ice	Eric "Booty" Greene	3:04
2	"The Ugly Show"	L. Manson; E. Greene	Black Ice	Eric "Booty" Greene	5:49
3	"A Dream Transferred"	L. Manson; E. Greene	Black Ice	Eric "Booty" Greene	3:08
4	"Lone Soldier"	L. Manson; E. Greene; E. Bass	Black Ice; Chinahblac	Eric "Booty" Greene	4:00
5	"Takeyatime"	L. Manson; E. Greene; T. Johnson	Black Ice; Musiq	Eric "Booty" Greene	4:48
6	"Nice2MeetU"	L. Manson; E. Greene; V. Roane	Black Ice; V	Eric "Booty" Greene	2:50
7	"Hoodwatch!!!"	L. Manson; E. Greene	Black Ice	Eric "Booty" Greene	4:03
8	"Front Page"	L. Manson; E. Greene	Black Ice	Eric "Booty" Greene	4:22
9	"Rain, Hail, Sleet or Snow"	L. Manson; E. Greene; H. Hill	Black Ice; H. Hill	Eric "Booty" Greene	4:09
10	"The Beast Within"	L. Manson; E. Greene; H. Hill	Black Ice; H. Hill	Eric "Booty" Greene	3:58
11	"Shine"	L. Manson; E. Greene; N. Stewart	Black Ice; Natalie Stewart of Floetry	Eric "Booty" Greene	2:56
12	"The Real"	L. Manson; E. Greene	Black Ice	Eric "Booty" Greene	5:49

== Personnel ==
Contributors
Producers
Producer(s)	Eric "Booty" Greene
Executive Producer(s)	DJ Jazzy Jeff
Performers
Lead vocals and rapping	Black Ice, Chinahblac, Musiq, V, H. Hill, Natalie Stewart
Additional and background vocals
Instrumentation'
Bass Guitar	Kenneth Wright
Acoustic Guitar	Rayfield "Ray Ray" Holloman
Technicians
Mixing	Eric "Booty" Green
Engineering	Eric "Booty" Green
Mastering	Arnold Mischkulnig
Management	Melody Forrester

== See also ==
- Russell Simmons' Def Poetry Jam
