= Black Ice (memoir) =

1991 memoir by Lorene Cary

- Cover of 1992 Vintage edition
- Author: Lorene Cary
- Genre: Memoir
- Publisher: Alfred A. Knopf (1st. ed.)
- ISBN: 978-0-679-73745-2
- Followed by: The Price of a Child (novel, 1995)

Black Ice is a memoir by American author Lorene Cary. First published in 1991, it relates the African American author's experiences at the elite St. Paul's boarding school in New Hampshire. The book, Cary's first publication and the stepping stone to her career as a writer, was a critical and commercial success.

== Background ==
Cary grew up in a working-class background in Philadelphia. In 1972, she was invited to the elite St. Paul's boarding school in New Hampshire, on scholarship, as only the second African-American female student. She spent two years at St. Paul's, graduating in 1974, and then worked as a journalist for publications including Time. After first writing about her experience at St. Paul's in a magazine article in 1988, she published a more complete memoir, Black Ice.

== Publication and reception ==
The book was published in 1991 by Alfred A. Knopf, and Phillip Lopate, reviewing the book for The New York Times called it a "stunning memoir". The book, "bruisingly honest about class, race and sex in America", found success with the critics and was shortlisted the same year by The New York Times as "summer reading"; her first publication, it was republished the next year by Vintage Books.
