= Angelina Castro =

Cuban-American pornographic film actress (born 1982)

- Castro in 2013
- Born: 1982 (age 43–44); Havana, Cuba
- Citizenship: Cuba, United States
- Occupations: Pornographic film actress; film producer
- Years active: 2006–present
- Known for: BBW pornography
- Children: 2
- Website: angelinacastrolive.com

Angelina Castro (born 1982) is an American pornographic film actress, film producer and radio personality. Castro grew up in Havana, Cuba, migrating to the United States when she was a child. After studying to be a chiropractor, Castro started working in adult films, starting in 2006, to pay off her student loans. The first Cuban-American adult film star, Castro gained national mainstream attention when she, and fellow porn actress Sara Jay, posted on Twitter that they would offer oral sex to fans of the Miami Heat, if the Heat won the NBA Finals – and the two women did. Castro makes regular appearances on American Spanish-language radio and television, often providing sex advice, and is the spokesperson for Garner's Garden skincare.

== Early life ==
Angelina Castro was born in 1982 in Havana, Cuba. She is a middle child, with a younger brother and an older sister. When she was ten, her family moved to Santo Domingo, Dominican Republic. Two years later, when she was twelve, the family relocated to Miami, Florida. Castro attended private schools in Miami. As a preteen, Castro participated in the 1994 Cuban rafter crisis protests in Miami.

== Career ==
Prior to working in the adult film industry, Castro worked at Walgreens and as a stylist. She went to college to be a chiropractor and worked as a therapist. Castro started in the pornographic industry in 2006. She began performing in adult films to pay off her student loans.

In July 2012, during the NBA Finals, Castro and fellow porn actress and promoter Sara Jay offered to perform oral sex on fans at a local nightclub in Miami if the Miami Heat won the championships. The Heat won, and Jay and Castro set up a website called "TEAMBJNBA" with the event information. The NBA filed a cease and desist letter and the website was taken down, however, the event still took place. Castro was interviewed on Radio Marti's 1800 Online in September 2012. Castro's interview, which included how she entered the porn industry and how Cubans could get involved in the porn industry, was removed from the radio show's website after public backlash. In 2015, Castro began co-hosting SOS (Sex or Sexy) on Mira.tv in Florida, a radio show focused on sex and sexuality in the Latino community.

During the 2016 United States presidential election, Castro and Maggie Green, also a porn actress, made national news when they offered to give blow jobs to voters, who voted for Hillary Clinton, if Clinton won the election. In 2018, Castro won her first AVN Award for Favorite BBW Performer. Castro appeared on the Puerto Rican television program Esto no tiene nombre in August 2019, during which she gave tips on how to have sex while pregnant. In 2019, she also became a spokesperson for the natural skin care company, Garner's Garden.

== Personal life ==
Castro lives in Miami, Florida. She has two children.

== Awards ==
- 2018 — AVN Award — Favorite BBW Performer
- 2021 — BBW Awards Hall of Fame
