= Derek Hay =

British pornographic film actor (born 1964)

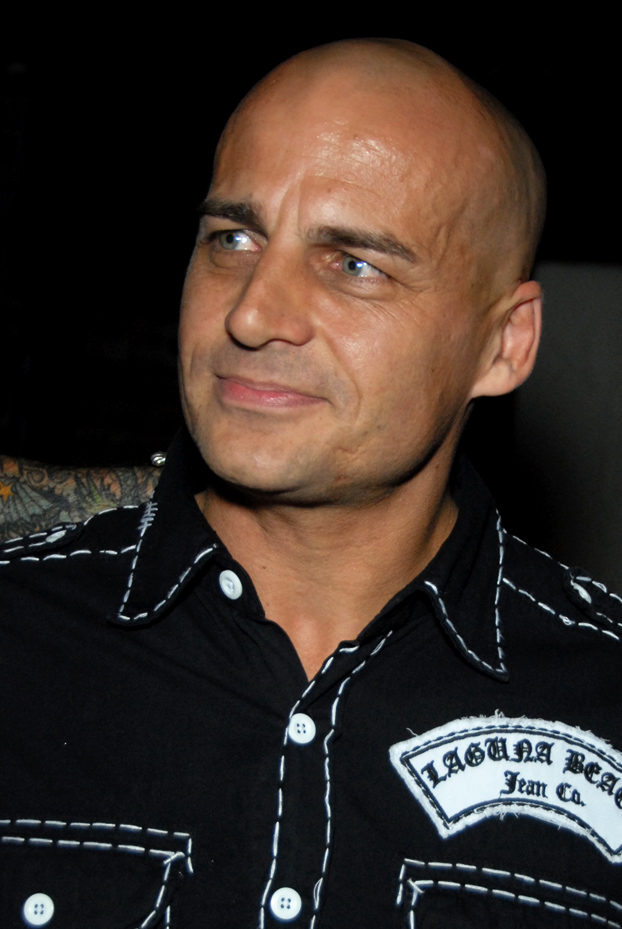
- Hay attending the "This Is Our Industry" A.I.M. Fundraiser Party at Les Deux, Hollywood, California, November 2009
- Born: Derek Andrew Hay; 12 August 1964 (age 62); England
- Occupation: Pornographic actor
- Height: 5 ft 9 in (1.75 m)

Derek Andrew Hay (born 12 August 1964), also known by his stage name Ben English, is a British pornographic actor and the founder and owner of the adult talent agency LA Direct Models. He semi-retired from performing in the late 2000s after appearing in nearly 800 movies. However, he has since then appeared in several movies. He appeared most recently in Digital Playground's Trading Mothers for Daughters, released in 2012.

Before founding LA Direct Models in 2000, Hay worked as a stage manager in London for acts including The Rolling Stones, Queen, and Metallica.

== Accusations and sentencing ==
As of 2020, several accounts of sexual abuse, trafficking, and employment standards violations have been lobbied against the LA Direct Models agency and Hay.

Hay, along with Dwight Cunningham and Karine Michmichian of the Luxury Companion, has also been formally charged by the California Department of Justice for an alleged participation in an illegal prostitution scheme. The complaint alleges that Hay would introduce clients of LA Direct Models to Michmichian and Cunningham for the purpose of prostitution. The complaint further alleges that Hay pressured a female client into prostitution by using the exclusivity provisions in one of his contracts to limit her access to work in pornography.

On 28 May 2024, Hay pleaded guilty to one charge of conspiracy to commit pandering and a charge of perjury, as part of a plea agreement with the California Attorney General. He was sentenced to nine months in county jail. He was released after serving 21 days.

== Awards ==
- 2004 XRCO Award – Best New Stud
- 2004 AVN Award – Best Male Newcomer
- 2009 AVN Award – Best Supporting Actor (Pirates II: Stagnetti's Revenge)
- 2014 AVN Hall of Fame

== See also ==
- List of British pornographic actors
- Jenna Presley, notable actress managed by Hay
