= LA Direct Models =

Talent agency for pornographic performers

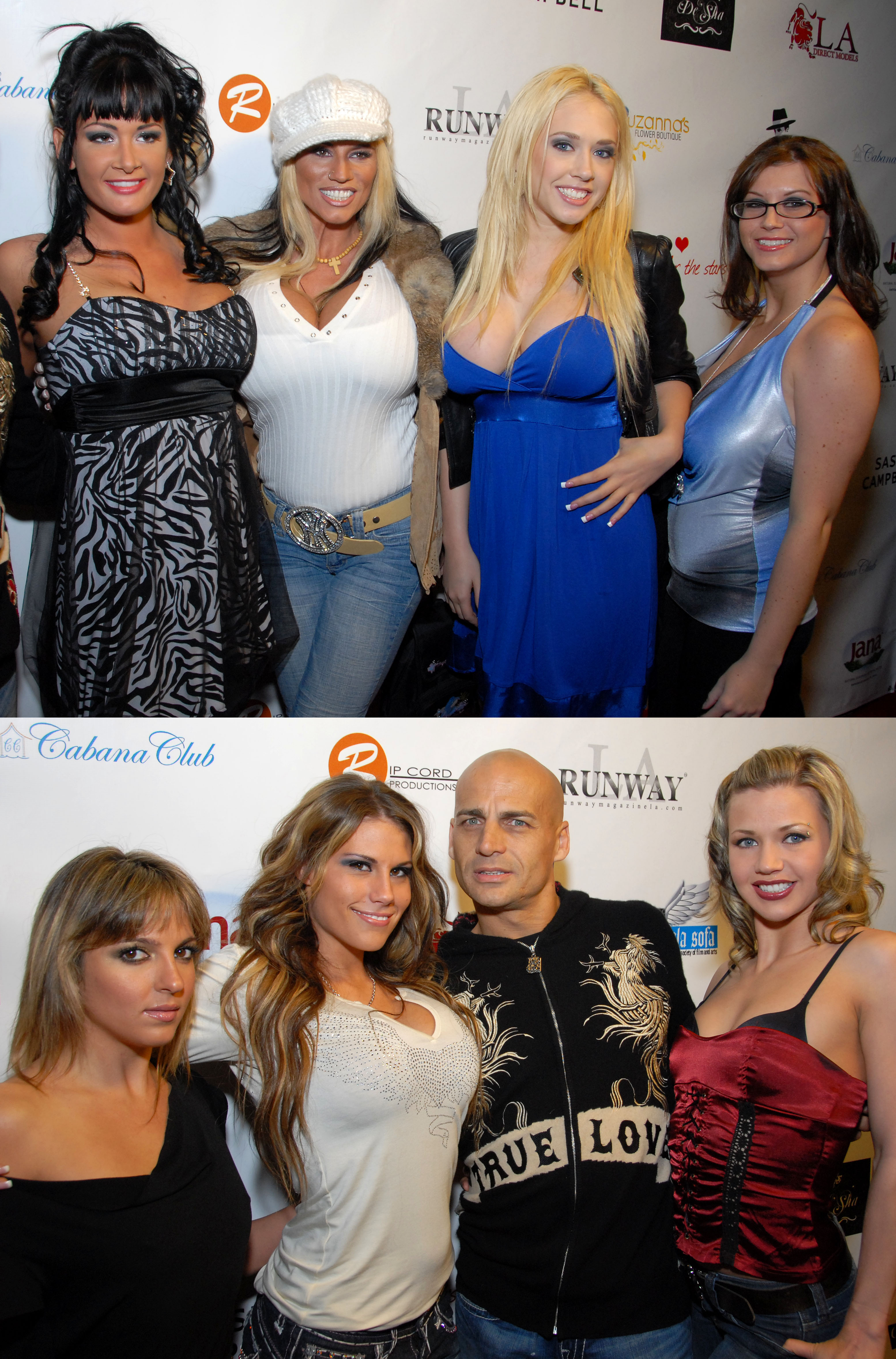
- LA Direct Models attending a fashion show by designer Tal Sheyn at the Cabana Club, Hollywood, California, February 2009. Founder Derek Hay (aka Ben English) in center of the bottom photo.
- Website: ladirectmodels.com

LA Direct Models is a talent agency for pornographic performers that was formed in 2000 by pornographic actor Derek Hay. Initially based in London, the agency booked adult film work in the United States for British females. The following year, once demand had grown, Hay and his then-girlfriend, porn actress Hannah Harper, moved the agency's headquarters to a one-bedroom apartment in Los Angeles, California. Their offices have since moved to the Cahuenga Pass, Hollywood, in the same building as the offices of the adult film producer Vivid Entertainment. In the fall of 2014, the agency opened a new office in Las Vegas, Nevada, and departed the Vivid building.

LA Direct Models represents around 130 female and 30 male performers, including Tori Black, Kagney Linn Karter, Alexis Texas and Lexi Belle. Havana Ginger became the agency's first contract performer in 2005, and in 2008 Kimber James became their first transsexual performer. In 2008, LA Direct Models, Lisa Ann Talent Management and The Lee Network formed a network to handle bookings for feature dancers. LA Direct Models now also represents production professionals such as directors and makeup artists.

In 2008, the agency launched an adult entertainment news website, L.A. Direct News.

As of 2020, several accounts of sexual abuse, trafficking, and employment standards violations have been lobbied against the agency and Hay. Derek Hay has also been personally indicted by the California Department of Justice on charges of involvement in an illegal prostitution scheme in connection with Dwight Cunningham and Karen Michmichian of The Luxury Companion.
