= Jennifer Ketcham =

American pornographic actress

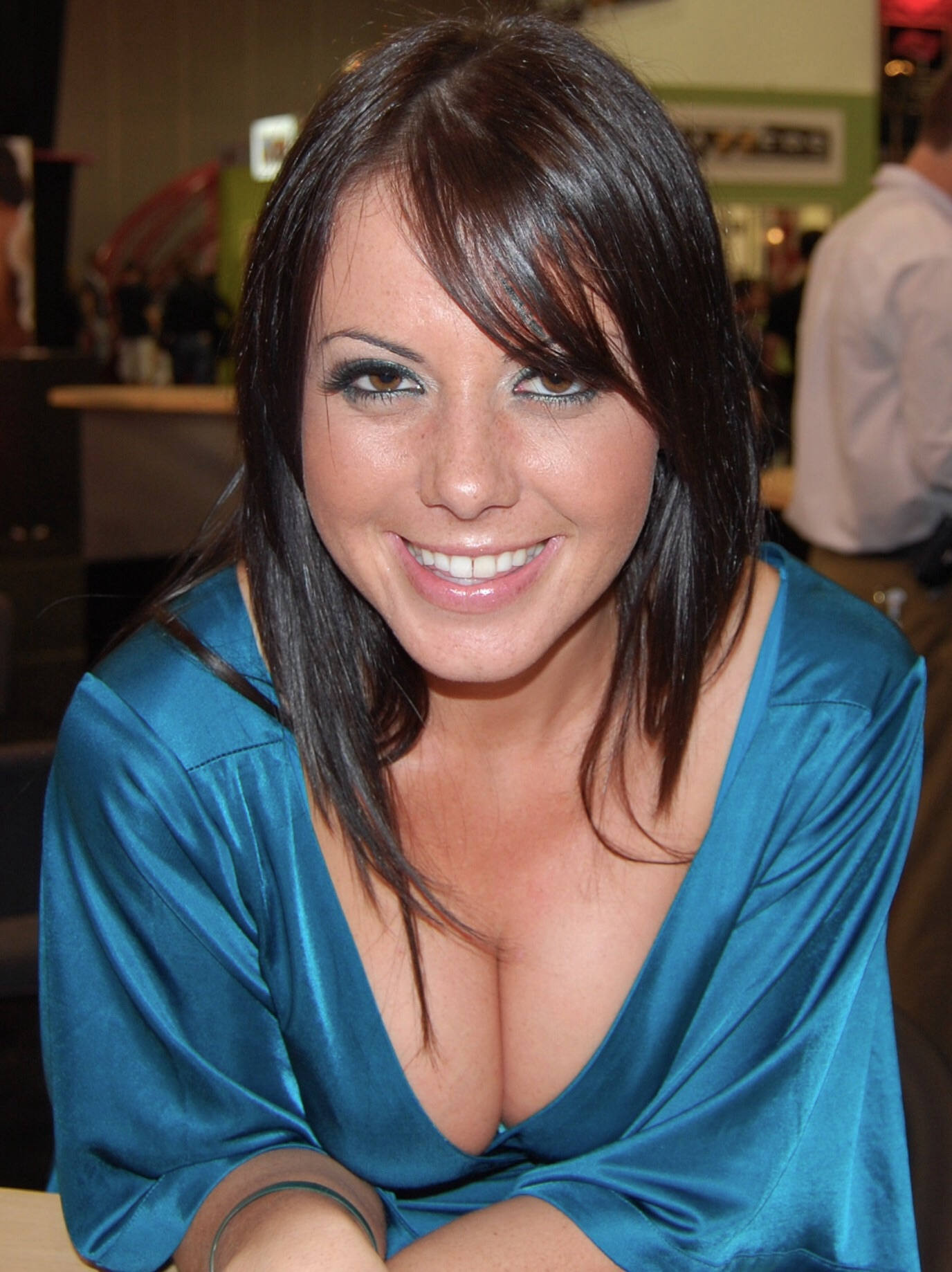
- Ketcham in 2008
- Born: Jennifer Ketcham; Aurora, Colorado, U.S.
- Other name: Penny Flame
- Occupations: Writer; reality television personality; blogger; artist
- Website: becomingjennie.wordpress.com

Jennifer "Jennie" Ketcham is an American writer, reality television personality, blogger, and artist. Before 2009, she worked as a pornographic film actress and director under the name Penny Flame. She later appeared on a number of television talk shows to discuss sex addiction, including The Oprah Winfrey Show, The Tyra Banks Show, The View, Entertainment Tonight, Extra and Lifechangers.

== Pornography career ==
Ketcham entered the pornography business at age 18, after answering an ad in the San Diego State University newspaper.

In 2005, Ketcham directed an instructional video for Shane's World Studios. In 2008, she signed a deal with Vivid Entertainment and Tristan Taormino to direct her own line of movies under the studio's sex education imprint, Vivid-Ed; the first film was Penny Flame's Expert Guide to Handjobs, and the second was Penny Flame's Expert Guide to Rough Sex. She retired from the industry in 2009.

=== Television appearances ===
In 2009, Ketcham appeared in the VH1 series Sex Rehab with Dr. Drew, a spin-off of Celebrity Rehab with Dr. Drew; her co-stars included Amber Smith, Nicole Narain, Kari Ann Peniche and Duncan Roy. Ketcham has said that she originally intended to disrupt the process in order to gain publicity and increase marketability as a porn star, but that after the first five days of treatment, she began to have a change of heart. Afterward, she entered a sober living facility, as depicted in the second season of Sober House, which premiered in March 2010.

The last adult film that Ketcham performed in, titled Celebrity Pornhab with Dr. Screw (a parody of the Celebrity Rehab series that had recently featured porn star Mary Carey), was shot just before her participation in Sex Rehab with Dr. Drew.

Ketcham discussed her path into pornography and her recovery from addiction with Pinsky and others in a March 17, 2010, appearance on The View. Ketcham stated on The View that she remained in the industry because it allowed her to work only three days a week while earning a substantial income; that it gave her the instant attention and acceptance of adoring fans, and it was the most convenient way to feed the sexual addiction associated with an inability to trust or form deep emotional connections with others; and that sex addiction preceded the substance addiction, but the two became intertwined and difficult to untangle. She explained that she had taken a year-long vow of abstinence when she completed treatment.

=== Awards ===
- 2005 AVN Award – Best Solo Sex Scene (Repo Girl)
- 2006 AVN Award – Best Couples Sex Scene, Film (Dark Side) with Herschel Savage
- 2006 AVN Award – Best Group Sex Scene, Film (Dark Side) with Alicia Alighatti, Dillan Lauren, Hillary Scott, Randy Spears & John West
- 2006 XRCO Award – Best Onscreen Couple (Dark Side – Red Light) with Herschel Savage
- 2006 Adam Film World Guide Award – Actress of the Year (Dark Side)
- 2008 AVN Award – Best Actress – Film (Layout)
- 2008 AVN Award – Best Couples Sex Scene, Film (Layout) with Tom Byron
- 2008 F.A.M.E. Award – Favorite Oral Starlet
- 2010 AVN Award – Best Supporting Actress (Throat: A Cautionary Tale)

== Writing career ==
In 2009, Ketcham started a blog titled Becoming Jennie. In her first entry, dated April 29, 2009, she wrote, "My name is Jennie Ketcham, and I am a recovering pornstar, and addict. This day, as every day, is the first day of the rest of my life, and I intend to live it to the fullest." The blog has been featured on Last Call with Carson Daly.

In December 2009, Ketcham began contributing to The Huffington Post. She published a memoir in July 2012 titled I Am Jennie.

== Personal life ==
Ketcham states she became sexually active at age 12, and that she practiced safe sex as a youth. She has explained that her sexual activity was a way for her to achieve the emotional validation missing from her relationships with family and friends. Her parents divorced when she was 13; Ketcham has said she had ceased speaking to her father and did not do so again until she was 26.

Ketcham is an avid painter and sees it as a healthy activity for sex addiction, as well as a new source of income. When she was enrolling in college, she forfeited all porn-related sources of income to make a clean break.
