= Celebrity Rehab Presents Sober House =

- Starring: Drew Pinsky; Jennifer Gimenez; Bob Forrest
- Country of origin: United States
- Original language: English
- No. of seasons: 2
- No. of episodes: 17

Production
- Executive producer: Dr. Drew Pinsky
- Running time: 60 min.
- Production companies: Irwin Entertainment, Inc. VH1

Original release
- Network: VH1
- Release: January 15, 2009 – April 29, 2010

Related
- Celebrity Rehab with Dr. Drew Sex Rehab with Dr. Drew

Celebrity Rehab Presents Sober House, or simply Sober House, is a VH1 reality television show. It was a spin-off of Celebrity Rehab with Dr. Drew, and premiered on January 15, 2009.

== Production ==
Sober House is a continuation of Celebrity Rehab, in which celebrities with substance addictions transition from a drug-rehabilitation center to a less structured, drug-free, sober living home, which is housed in a mansion in the Hollywood Hills. The facility, at which the recovering addicts stay for 30 days, is run by House Manager Jennifer Gimenez and rehab tech Will Smith, a former stuntman. Bob Forrest serves as the head counselor. Dr. Drew Pinsky provides outpatient counseling to the recovering addicts during their time in the house.

The production employs a camera crew for each cast member. Producers filmed 2,500 to 3,000 hours of footage for the nine 43-minute episodes of the first season. The camera crews are instructed not to interfere with the cast, but to alert producers if they observe unsafe behavior. This policy is what led to the calling the police on Steven Adler during the first season.

As with Celebrity Rehab, the cast members are paid for their appearance on the show.

Pinsky announced in December 2010 that he has stopped production of future seasons of Sober House, as it was deemed too intrusive, and interfered with the treatment plan.

== Recurring cast ==
Casts for individual seasons are seen in sections for those seasons.

- Jennifer Gimenez - The House Manager of the sober living facility. She is a model and actress, and a recovering addict herself, who first met Season 2 resident Tom Sizemore four years previously when they were both in treatment for substance abuse.
- Dr. Drew Pinsky - MD, addiction specialist.
- Bob Forrest - The Head Counselor during group sessions. He is also Chemical Dependency Program Director at Las Encinas Hospital.
- Will Smith - A Rehab Technician described as the "muscle" of the facility. He is also a recovering addict.
- Loesha Zeviar - A Resident Technician at the Pasadena Recovery Center who first appeared in the second season of Celebrity Rehab. She shows up at Jennifer's house in the sixth episode of Season 2 to assist her. Pinsky has referred to her as one of the strongest staff members at the PRC.
- Shirley Bennet The facility manager at the Pasadena Recovery Center. She first appeared on Celebrity Rehab, and appears in Season 2, episode 7.
- Dr. Charles Sophy - psychiatrist and director of the Los Angeles County Department of Children and Family Services. He is also the author of Side By Side The Revolutionary Mother-Daughter Program for Conflict-Free Communication, and is the lead psychiatrist of the Celebrity Rehab and Sober House production team. Although he only appears occasionally, he was present throughout the filming of the second season.

== Reception ==
Andy Dehnart of Reality Blurred called the series "more harrowing, compelling, and entertaining" than its parent show. Producer John Irwin said that Sober House is "more compelling than Celebrity Rehab. It really is where the real work begins with these guys."

== Season 1 ==
Season One Cast
Celebrity	Alumnus of
Nikki McKibbin	Celebrity Rehab 2
Mary Carey	Celebrity Rehab 1
Seth Binzer	Celebrity Rehab 1, Celebrity Rehab 2
Steven Adler	Celebrity Rehab 2
Andy Dick	None
Amber Smith	Celebrity Rehab 2
Rodney King	Celebrity Rehab 2

Season one episodes
No. overall	No. in season	Title	Original release date
1	1	TBA	January 15, 2009
The patients arrive at the sober living facility. Jennifer Gimenez, the manager, explains the rules to them. Steven Adler comes to the house under the influence of drugs, and in possession of heroin.
2	2	TBA	January 22, 2009
The house holds a barbecue for the friends of the participants. During the barbecue, Steven becomes noticeably aggravated, going to an upstairs bathroom when the power goes out. A heroin-caked tin foil pipe and a lighter are found in the bathroom after he leaves. After he continues to act in a combative manner towards the staff and the camera crews, Jennifer calls the police and asks them to remove him from the house.
3	3	TBA	January 29, 2009
The police arrive at the facility and take Steven into custody due to his possession of heroin. The next morning the residents question Jennifer's decision to call the police. All of the residents, excluding Rodney King, go to a nightclub where their sobriety will be tested. Everyone returns to the facility in time except for Seth Binzer, causing the others to fear he relapsed. He arrives an hour and a half after curfew, and states that he has remained sober throughout the night.
4	4	TBA	February 5, 2009
Andy Dick joins the house after four days of sobriety, and shares a room with Seth. Against the advice of Jennifer and the rest of the housemates, Amber attends a party, where she relapses on alcohol and calls the house saying she will not be back in time for the curfew.
5	5	TBA	February 12, 2009
Amber comes back to the house after a night of binge drinking. Meanwhile, Mary Carey is having trouble with her boyfriend, David, who constantly criticizes her. Seth becomes increasingly disturbed when David calls him a "has been", causing him to relapse. He abruptly leaves the group, causing unrest in the house. Seth communicates via MySpace to the housemates, in the form of increasingly disturbing messages.
6	6	TBA	February 19, 2009
Seth relapses, sending via video messages to the rest of the cast. Rodney goes for a ride with Dr. Drew, showing him the location of his infamous beating and recounting the night's events. Later, the cast learns Seth went into a hospital and may be in serious condition.
7	7	TBA	February 26, 2009
Seth returns to the facility after waking up in the hospital a few nights earlier. Nikki learns that two people in her life have died. Mary is at odds with her conscience when deciding whether or not to host Swingfest. Meanwhile, the housemates go paintballing, during which Jennifer's true feelings come out when Seth shoots her in the leg with a paint ball gun. Seth gives Jennifer some crack he finds in his shorts.
8	8	TBA	March 5, 2009
Rodney is eager to start his own sober living facility until he arrives at his house and is discouraged by the devastation wrought by his drinking. Mary breaks up with David, to the delight of the cast. Nikki sings her song "Inconsolable", and Steve may have fallen off the wagon again. Andy travels around town to make amends to the people he has hurt during his drunken binges to wary reactions.
9	9	TBA	March 12, 2009
Andy makes amends to his son, Lucas, who bore the worst of his drinking. Dr. Drew remodels Rodney's home, much to his delight, and motivates him to stay sober. Amber faces the real world with severe anxiety but works her way through it to get her own apartment. Steve is busted for marijuana use and has to go back to the hospital. Seth's new song is picked up by legendary producer George Clinton, and has a new resolve to stay sober, thanks to a fellow band member also in recovery, and the addition of two new bodyguards to keep him on the straight and narrow. Mary and Nikki both face uncertain futures.

== Season 2 ==
The second season of Celebrity Rehab Presents Sober House premiered March 11, 2010. The five alumni of Celebrity Rehab 3 arrived at the sober living facility one week after completing their drug rehab treatment depicted during that series.

Season Two Cast
Celebrity	Alumnus of
Dennis Rodman	Celebrity Rehab 3
Heidi Fleiss	Celebrity Rehab 3
Seth Binzer	Celebrity Rehab 1, Celebrity Rehab 2, Sober House 1
Jennie Ketcham	Sex Rehab
Kari Ann Peniche	Sex Rehab, Celebrity Rehab 3
Kendra Jade Rossi	Sex Rehab
Tom Sizemore	Celebrity Rehab 3
Mike Starr	Celebrity Rehab 3

Note: In the synopses, house manager Jennifer Gimenez is referred to as "Jennifer", while patient Jennie Ketcham will be referred to as "Jennie", as that is the diminutive that Ketcham herself and others use to refer to her.

Season two episodes
No. overall	No. in season	Title	Original release date
10	1	TBA	March 11, 2010
As the patients settle in, Jennifer Gimenez finds a crack pipe in Tom's luggage. Dennis refuses to sign the agreement required of all patients, which would preclude him from remaining. Kari Ann tests positive for methamphetamine, and becomes abusive toward Jennifer in a way that Dr. Drew recalls as the behavior she exhibited when under the influence.
11	2	TBA	March 18, 2010
Kari Ann, worried that allowing her Celebrity Rehab co-star Mindy McCready to live in her house has given her access to sensitive videos on her computer, tries to go home to attend to the matter. After being told that she is going back to the Sober House by the driver, she punches a cameraman; due to this display of violence, she is evicted from the Sober House. Relapsing alumnus Seth Binzer contacts Dr. Drew for help, causing Drew to take a hard line with him. Bob counsels the group to try finding day-to-day jobs in order to help integrate them back into society, but Kendra, Mike and Heidi, who are dissatisfied with the work, are not able to commit to their jobs. Mike experiences withdrawal from suboxone.
12	3	TBA	March 25, 2010
After Mike assaults a cameraman, he spends the night with Will, before being allowed back into the sober living facility on a provisional basis. Kari Ann returns to the facility, but Heidi's reaction causes her to leave for good, and later, causes Tom to walk out during a group session, and leave as well. Bob later goes looking for him. The cast goes out for the night, but after Tom, Mike, Dennis and Jennie miss their midnight curfew by over an hour, they are disciplined with punishment and restrictions, which a confrontational Dennis rejects.
13	4	TBA	April 1, 2010
Those who missed curfew in the previous episode are made to write essays as part of their punishment, but while Tom and Jennie's are eloquent, Mike and Dennis' are less than constructive. Mike, who talks about wanting to use again, exhibits erratic and abusive behavior, prompting suspicion that he has been using. Jennifer attempts to encourage the cast to do productive things in order to avoid the boredom that can lead to relapse. Heidi returns to Nevada to deal with the legal consequences of a past DUI, but later tests positive for opiates, amphetamines, and benzodiazepine. She continues to exchange malicious words with Tom, resulting in threats by him to move out, and an emotional breakdown. Tom, offended at Mike's treatment of Will, has a heated argument with Mike, and exchanges threats of violence with him.
14	5	TBA	April 8, 2010
Dr. Drew arrives to defuse the situation between Tom, Mike and Heidi. Heidi leaves the house for the night for testing positive for methamphetamine. Drew tries to bring the group together over a casual meal, and decides that he needs to see them more often. Jennifer, in an attempt to bring the house closer together, takes the residents rappelling off waterfalls, but Jennie comes into conflict with Kendra. Mike resolves to cease his abusive behavior, but when he later resumes it, he infuriates Jennifer, bringing her to tears.
15	6	TBA	April 15, 2010
Dennis goes to court to resolve a past domestic violence complaint, and later has a one-on-one with Dr. Drew. Jennifer's difficulties with Mike recur and escalate into behavior she deems violent, leading to a meeting between her and Drew in which he outlines problems on both his part and hers. He also meets with the group, some members of which complain about Jennifer's abilities. In response, Drew assigns Loesha Zeviar to assist Jennifer at the sober living house.
16	7	TBA	April 22, 2010
As the group's time in sober living nears its end, Drew meets with them to discuss how they will restructure their lives, while Jennifer meets with psychiatrist Dr. Charles Sophy to discuss her feelings about how Mike has treated her. Tom goes to court to resolve the issue of his probation, and is helped by the others as he finds a new apartment. Dennis sees his mother for the first time in seven years, and after they speak with Drew, she meets her grandchildren. The group throws a party, but it is complicated by the presence of Seth's friend, a porn actress named Jenna who tests positive for cocaine and benzodiazepine.
17	8	TBA	April 29, 2010
In the season finale, the cast discusses the previous night's events. Dennis leaves early in order to make contractually obligated nightclub appearances in Edmonton. Dr. Drew helps Jennie begin a new career in production. Mike resists Drew's insistence that he attend aftercare, and though he reconsiders after a visit from his friends, including recovering addict Ace Frehley, he later experiences anxiety at a concert in which Frehley, Tenacious D guitarist Kyle Gass and Sober House alum Steven Adler appear. Tom and Heidi part ways as friends.
