= Tim Ryan (recovery advocate) =

American activist, drug abuse interventionist, author and speaker

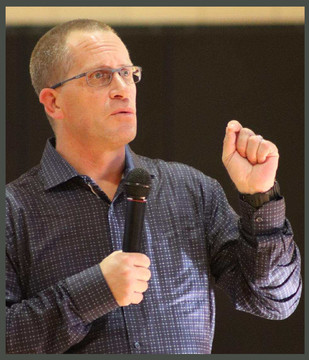
- Known for: Advocacy for substance abusers, “A Man in Recovery Foundation”, “Dope Man”
- Notable work: lobbyist for legislative change in American drug policy, proponent of Drug policy reform.
- Website: timryanspeaks.com

Tim Ryan (born 1968) is an American activist, drug abuse interventionist, author and speaker. He is the Founder and Executive director of “A Man in Recovery” foundation. According to the National Safety Council, Ryan is notable for his position in favor of Drug policy reform and as a proponent of legislative change in American drug policy. His work was the subject of the A&E series “Dope Man” in July 2017. Ryan is also the author of the 2017 memoir From Dope to Hope: A Man in Recovery.

== Early life ==
Tim Ryan was born in 1968. He is a native of Crystal Lake Illinois,

== Later life ==
=== Struggle with addiction ===
Tim Ryan struggled with addiction for 30 years. At the age of 32, Ryan first used heroin and quickly slid into spending a substantial amount of money on illicit opioids. He was a successful technology entrepreneur who used a variety of drugs including alcohol, cocaine, ecstasy and marijuana. He later got divorced, lost his home and a son to addiction. According to him, during his years of drug abuse, he suffered two heart attacks, eight overdoses, was held in more than 20 county jails on drug and alcohol-related charges, and was pronounced clinically dead on three occasions.

=== Recovery ===
During his stay at the Sheridan Correctional Center in the state of Illinois, Ryan joined the drug and alcohol treatment program. He became sober, attended group meetings and therapy sessions, and actively participated in the prison's rehabilitation program. As a result of his personal transformation, Ryan was paroled in late 2013 after serving 13 months of a seven-year sentence. He continued to attend group meetings for recovering addicts. He then made extensive efforts to reach out to those struggling to overcome addiction to heroin and other opiates, and their families. Further, Ryan made plans to start his own organization, offering assistance to individuals, families and communities impacted by America's opioid abuse epidemic. He works to expose the truth about addiction from a former addict's perspective. He is also involved in communities, helping to find solutions to drug addiction and instill messages of hope and recovery.

== Career ==
=== A Man in Recovery Foundation (AMIR) ===
Following the death of his son, Ryan founded A Man in Recovery Foundation (AMIRF), a nonprofit anti-addiction organization. Under Ryan's leadership, AMIRF sponsors recovery and support groups for drug addicts and their families. It provides placements in treatment centers and sober living facilities, and sponsors community outreach initiatives designed to raise awareness about the prevalence of opioid abuse and addiction.

Under the auspices of AMIRF, Ryan works regularly as a motivational speaker, lecturer and a coach, counselor and interventionist for substance abusers. According to him, he has led more than 1,500 interventions since his release from prison in 2013.

=== Counseling and public speaking ===
Ryan is the national outreach Director for Transformations, a drug and alcohol treatment center. It offers adult, young adult, veterans, first responder, Christian and music-based recovery programs Before this position, he worked as the Midwest regional outreach coordinator for Banyan Treatment center in Pompano Beach, Florida. Ryan has also referred hundreds of people with substance use disorders to rehabilitation facilities throughout the United States. Ryan is an advisor to Rehab.com, a hub for people seeking information about drug and alcohol treatment centers. He spoke at a community forum entitled "The Unforgettable Drug Program: The Cop and the Convict", cosponsored by the local nonprofit group KidsMatter and the Naperville Police Department. He is an advocate for better treatment of people dealing with drug and alcohol use disorders.

Ryan works as a public speaker on the subject of substance abuse and mental health awareness with his wife, Jennifer Gimenez, whose own recovery from addiction was mentioned during her appearances on the reality television series Celebrity Rehab with Dr. Drew and Sober House.

=== From Dope to Hope ===
Ryan's life story is detailed in his autobiography From Dope to Hope: A Man in Recovery, published in 2017. The book introduces a man who lost everything to heroin and drug abuse and then recovered. His transformation came after he made decisions to dedicate his life to help others overcome addiction. Ryan is an advocate of a 12-step peer support addiction treatment of addicts convicted of drug-related crimes. He formed many alliances with legislators, judges and law enforcement officials who share the same beliefs.

== Recognition ==
Through his work, Ryan is referred to in the media as a national figure in the fight against the opioid epidemic in United States. His life story and work have been featured in many publications, podcasts and television shows, including the Chicago Tribune, Newsweek, The Steve Harvey Show and Dr. Drew's podcast. Ryan has collaborated with Bill Foster, Steve Harvey, Drew Pinsky and Jason Hervey in national campaigns against substance abuse. In January 2016, Ryan was invited by Rep. Bill Foster, D-Illinois, to attend President Obama's State of the Union Address. Ryan was an invited guest of many medical shows including the Steve Harvey Show (with Dr. Drew), The Doctors, The Bill and Wendy Show on WGN radio and Varney & Company on the Fox Business. In 2016, Ryan spoke about the opioid epidemic at the TEDx Naperville conference. Ryan was the star of the A&E documentary Dope Man, produced by Bischoff Hervey Entertainment and aired on July 31, 2017. Ryan was featured in more than 50 notable national and state newspapers and magazines including Newsweek, USA Today and the Chicago Tribune. He also assisted CNN on a series about heroin in the community in the Fall of 2016. His work at the A Man in Recovery Foundation (AMIRF) in Naperville, Illinois, has been mentioned in several state media.

== Personal life ==
Ryan's son Nick also suffered from addiction and died from a heroin overdose at the age of 20.

In June 2020 Ryan became engaged to his partner, Jennifer Gimenez. They married on December 31, 2020 in a private Beverly Hills ceremony, with Ryan's daughter, MacKenzie in attendance.

== See also ==
- Comprehensive Addiction and Recovery Act
