= The Real World: Hollywood =

American reality TV series, season 20 (2008)

Coordinates: 34°05′55″N 118°19′21″W

- Season 20
- The original cast of The Real World: Hollywood
- Starring: Sarah Ralston; Joey Kovar; Brianna Taylor; Dave Malinosky; William Gilbert; Kimberly Alexander; Greg Halstead; Nick Brown; Brittini Sherrod
- No. of episodes: 13

Release
- Original network: MTV
- Original release: April 16 – July 12, 2008

Season chronology
- ← Previous; The Real World: Sydney Next → The Real World: Brooklyn

The Real World: Hollywood is the twentieth season of MTV's reality television series The Real World, about a group of diverse strangers living together for several months in a different city each season, as cameras follow their lives and interpersonal relationships. It is the fifth season of The Real World to be filmed in the Pacific States region, after The Real World: San Diego.

The series follows nine cast members over the course of the season, with one cast member evicted and replaced, and another replaced after he voluntarily left the show. It is the only season set in the Hollywood district of Los Angeles and the first one to revisit a host city, as the show's second season was set in L.A. in 1993. This season also makes California the most common state for a setting. Production ran from August to December 2007. The season premiered on April 16, 2008 and consisted of 13 episodes.

== Season changes ==
The previous nineteen seasons were aired as half-hour episodes. This season is the first to be aired as 13 one-hour episodes, a move that is credited as helping MTV rank as the #1 network in the Wednesday 10pm - 11pm time slot among people age 12-34. MTV continued with this format with the following seasons. MTV has also supplemented the airings with The Real World Dailies, an online series of unaired production footage launched in mid-April 2008 that, as of May 13, 2008, amassed 3 million hits by nearly 400,000 unique visitors.

A Real World: Hollywood marathon hosted by Coral Smith of The Real World: Back to New York was aired July 4, 2008. It featured commentary by Smith and other alumni of The Real World and Road Rules, referred to as "CoralVision".

MTV also aired The Sunny Side of Truth encore special, which features pop-up comments from characters from the Sunny Side of Truth, an anti-tobacco organization. Because a recurring theme of this season involves cast members talking about their struggles with drug and alcohol addiction, the comments often have a drug-abstinence message.

== Assignment ==
Almost every season of The Real World, beginning with its fifth season, has included the assignment of a season-long group job or task to the housemates, continued participation in which has been mandatory to remain part of the cast since the Back to New York season. The Hollywood cast was assigned to take improv comedy classes at iO WEST, a comedy club in Hollywood. The cast names their group WTF, which ostensibly stands for Whiskey Tango Foxtrot, but subtextually stands for "What the Fuck", which cast member Dave Malinosky explains in Episode 8 is the reaction the cast predicted they would invoke in their audience.

== The residence ==
The cast residence, Stage 20, was located at Columbia Square, in a seven-story, 105,000-square-foot (9,800 m^{2}) building at 6121 West Sunset Boulevard at the intersection of North Gower Street in Gower Gulch, Los Angeles that formerly served as a CBS broadcast facility where programs such as I Love Lucy were filmed (Map). The building is part of a 125,000-foot (38,000 m) complex that takes up an entire city block, which previously housed eight studios and CBS's local television and radio operations, including KCBS-TV/KCAL-TV, KNX Radio and KCBS-FM. The complex also included a 1,050 seat auditorium, a restaurant, and a bank. The northeast corner of the complex was used for filming. It is 23.3 miles (37.5 km) from the Venice beach house where The Real World: Los Angeles was filmed. The property was purchased in August 2006 for $66 million USD by Molasky Pacific, LLC, who intend to redevelop it to attract other residential and office tenants.

According to MTV, this season of The Real World was the first to incorporate environmentally friendly household and lifestyle choices, including a solar-heated swimming pool that uses salt to reduce the need for chemical treatment, Energy Star appliances, bamboo flooring, recycled glass counters, some sustainable furniture, energy efficient lighting, a computer powered by an exercise bicycle, paperless toilets, a smart stove, an air conditioner system that provides water for an outdoor vegetable garden, a computer that tracks the amount of carbon saved by the housemates, and a hybrid car.

== Cast ==
MTV revealed the cast on The Real World Awards Bash, which aired April 2, 2008. This is the first (and only) season in which a cast member was chosen by the fans via a multistage online poll from a pool of 20,000 applicants. The seventh cast member as voted by the fans was 20-year-old model Greg Halstead.

The majority of the cast members are entertainment industry types that could best take advantage of the Hollywood setting to forward their career goals. On December 5, 2007 the cast was filmed performing at iO WEST, which served as the season's workplace, orchestrating a sketch as the comedy troupe Whiskey Tango Foxtrot.

Cast member	Age^{1}	Hometown
Brianna Taylor	20	Mount Airy, Pennsylvania
Brianna is an exotic dancer and aspiring singer who once auditioned for American Idol and reached the top 44 on Season 5. According to mtv.com, she is outspoken in her views, and does not tolerate disrespect, but has a sensitive side. She had a volatile relationship with her now-ex-boyfriend, Bobby, prior to moving to Hollywood. According to Brianna, Bobby cheated on her repeatedly, and at one point caused a physical altercation that resulted in a warrant for her arrest that she had to return home to resolve. She reveals in Episode 2 that she used to use crystal meth and cocaine as recently as two months prior. She initially develops a mutual attraction with Joey, but is disturbed by how he behaves when drunk. She returns to Philadelphia in Episodes 4 and 8 to resolve her legal troubles, and ponders her lingering feelings for Bobby.
Dave Malinosky	22	Waynesboro, Pennsylvania
According to mtv.com, Dave is a humorous, outgoing man who loves to use shock humor, and a naturally gifted athlete who enjoys all sports from football to cheerleading. As he is very comfortable in front of a camera, he hopes to become an actor or TV host. He and Kimberly become attracted to one another, and it is indicated in Episode 5 that their relationship was consummated sexually.
Greg Halstead	20	Daytona Beach, Florida
Greg is the first cast member to be selected by a viewer poll. He refers to people around him as "peasants", and to women as "associates", is extremely competitive in sports, and a prankster around the house. He studied criminal justice at the University of Florida, but is a model. His Internet screen name in the viewer poll was "PretyBoy", and says that viewers picked him because he is very attractive. The rest of the cast is offended by what they see as standoffish on his part when they first meet him, a personality trait of his that causes recurring problems, as in Episode 3. He shows little interest in performing improv with the others, and after missing a number of performances, he is fired from the job in Episode 8, and is required to move out and leave the show.
Joey Kovar	24	Evergreen Park, Illinois
A personal trainer and former bodybuilder who constantly works out, Joey has never ventured outside of Illinois. He is an aspiring actor. Though focused today, he has survived a past that has included addiction. In his audition tape, he explains his health regimen by saying he eats only things such as water, tuna, eggs, protein drinks, fruits and vegetables and oatmeal. He says he comes from a home where he was frequently beaten, remarking, "I ain't no pretty little white boy." He and Brianna develop a mutual attraction in the first two episodes, but it is complicated by his attempts to overcome his alcoholism. He enters a 30-day treatment program in Episode 4, and returns to the house in Episode 8. Fearing a relapse, he moves out in Episode 9. He returns to see the cast's final performance at the iO in the final episode, and as of The Real World: Hollywood Reunion, he revealed that he had been sober for ten months, and had returned to acting, having filmed a movie called 10,000 Doors.
Kimberly Alexander	24	Columbia, South Carolina
Kimberly is a Southern woman, raised in a devoutly religious household, who is sometimes perceived as "ditsy". According to mtv.com, she doesn't always think before speaking, and at times, her roommates often find her statements offensive. She hopes to become host of an entertainment show. She and David become attracted to one another, and it is indicated in Episode 5 that their relationship was consummated sexually.
Sarah Ralston	21	Phoenix, Arizona
A recent Arizona State University graduate, Sarah is a feminist and aspiring broadcast journalist with some strong conservative, traditional views. She is close to her family, and this is the first time she has lived so far from them. The move to Hollywood also put a strain on her relationship with her boyfriend, who used to be her debate coach. At The Real World: Hollywood Reunion, she revealed that she was engaged.
William Gilbert	24	Detroit, Michigan
MTV.com describes Will, a DJ and aspiring music producer who does work at weddings, parties and bar mitzvahs, as cute, charismatic, witty, and the ladies' man of the house. He dates Janelle Casanave from The Real World: Key West, whom he meets in Episode 8, but his attraction to his housemate Brittini, who moves in in Episode 10, causes conflict for all three of them.
Brittini Sherrod	22	Tempe, Arizona
Brittini is one of the two roommates who move into the house in Episode 10, following the departure of Greg and Joey. She is a model. MTV.com describes her as a confrontational young woman of mixed race who grew up an only child conflicted about her racial identity, but who recently began wearing her hair more naturally. She is trying to mend fences with her estranged African-American father. She is described as a "flirt", but has a long-distance boyfriend named Jeremy. She forms an immediate attraction with Will, who returns the flirtation, but his feelings about this in light of his girlfriend Janelle cause conflict between him and Brittini.
Nick Brown	23	New Rochelle, New York
Nick is one of the two roommates who move into the house in Episode 10, following the departure of Greg and Joey. Nick is a Jamaican-born man from New York, and a recent college graduate; he is an aspiring model and television host. He is very close with his family, though he has some unresolved issues with his father. MTV.com describes him as a "ladies man", but he doesn't consider himself a player, as he respects each one of them. He comes into conflict with Sarah in Episode 11, and grieves over the loss of a loved one in the same episode.

^Note 1: Age at time of filming.

=== Duration of cast ===
Cast Member	Hollywood Episodes												
Cast Member	1	2	3	4	5	6	7	8	9	10	11	12	13
Brianna	Featured	Featured	Featured	Featured	Featured	Featured	Featured	Featured	Featured	Featured	Featured	Featured	Featured
Dave	Featured	Featured	Featured	Featured	Featured	Featured	Featured	Featured	Featured	Featured	Featured	Featured	Featured
Kimberly	Featured	Featured	Featured	Featured	Featured	Featured	Featured	Featured	Featured	Featured	Featured	Featured	Featured
Sarah	Featured	Featured	Featured	Featured	Featured	Featured	Featured	Featured	Featured	Featured	Featured	Featured	Featured
Will	Featured	Featured	Featured	Featured	Featured	Featured	Featured	Featured	Featured	Featured	Featured	Featured	Featured
Brittini										Entered (Note: Brittini and Nick replaced Greg and Joey in Episode 10.)	Featured	Featured	Featured
Nick										Entered	Featured	Featured	Featured
Joey	Featured	Featured	Featured	Featured	Featured	Featured	Featured	Featured	Left (Note: Joey voluntarily left the house in Episode 9 after fearing a relapse of his drinking problem.)				Return (Note: Joey returned to the house in the season finale after wanting to see the cast's finale performance.)
Greg	Featured	Featured	Featured	Featured	Featured	Featured	Featured	removed (Note: Greg is required to leave the house and show in Episode 8 after getting fired from the cast job.)					

== Episodes ==
No. overall	No. in season	Title	Original release date
441	1	"Welcome to Hollywood"	April 16, 2008
The cast assembles at the house. Sarah, Kimberly, and Joey perceive Greg to be unfriendly, negative, cocky, and immature. Will is surprised to learn Brianna is a stripper, and she feels that he lost respect for her because of this. She learns an arrest warrant was issued for her back home for an incident in which Bobby, her now-ex-boyfriend, hit her and tried to prevent her from leaving their home. She has to return home to resolve it. Will says he has a crush on Sarah. Greg angers Joey by calling him a "weirdo". When Greg dismisses criticism of his behavior, Kimberly, Dave, Joey and Brianna have a group confessional in which they criticize him. In response, Greg calls them "peasants", "fools", and "clowns", saying he doesn't need to change for them because he is "perfection".
442	2	"Let's Not Get Ghetto"	April 23, 2008
Greg and Joey put their differences aside. Greg invites Will out one night, but Sarah is upset that Will will miss her birthday party. The women are offended when, during dinner, the men flirt with a woman who later shows up at the house and is turned away. The same thing occurs the next night when a man Sarah met at her birthday party shows up at the house. Dave and Kim flirt platonically. Joey and Brianna make out and share a bed. Kim and Brianna argue when the house's maximum allowable number of guests (seven) is exceeded. During this Kim says, "Let's not get ghetto", a statement Will sees as racist, but Kim explains Brianna has said this about herself. Greg helps them make up. Brianna is disturbed over how Joey behaves when drunk. Joey himself doesn't like going to bars or drinking any more, but fears he cannot withstand peer pressure.
443	3	"Where's Joey?"	April 30, 2008
Kim and Dave insist that they do not want their flirtation to lead to a relationship. Joey and Brianna reveal past problems with substance abuse, and fear recidivism. Greg is suspected to be responsible for a series of pranks. Andy Dick tells the cast they will take improv comedy lessons at the iO WEST theater with Artistic Director Charna Halpern, who will be their coach. The cast feels Greg's disinterest in this comes across as rude, and his refusal to attend a mandatory comedy night with them gets him in trouble with Charna. Brianna and Joey's relationship experiences tension, in part due to Brianna's dalliance with another man named JoJo.
444	4	"Joey's Intervention"	May 7, 2008
Brianna returns to Philadelphia with Will to resolve her legal troubles. Dave and Joey are angered by Kim and Sarah, whom they think are too judgmental of people who become strippers out of financial necessity. Conflict stemming from roommates bringing home guests early in the morning recurs, as from Joey's alcohol-fueled temper, including a tantrum from him that frightens his roommates. He agrees to leave the house to begin a 30-day treatment program. Brianna returns to the house, and realizes she still has feelings for Bobby, her ex.
445	5	"I Need Lovin'"	May 14, 2008
Kim and Dave's relationship, which is revealed to have become sexual, experiences conflict. Greg lands a fashion show that conflicts with his improv classes. Brianna ponders her music career prospects, and her lack of motivation. Brianna brings JoJo home, and has sex with him as Kim and Sarah lie awake in their beds nearby, angering them, particularly Sarah. Will plays his music for rapper Sticky Fingaz, who responds positively. Brianna makes up with Sarah, and resolves to work harder on her music.
446	6	"Greg Vs. The House"	May 21, 2008
Tension is created by a visit by Sarah's boyfriend, Ryan, by Dave's dalliances with other women, despite his having consummated his relationship with Kimberly, and by comments made by Greg, Sarah and Kimberly about these women. As a result, Greg claims to now be on bad terms with every one of his housemates. The conflict continues when Sarah reports her underwear stolen from her drawer, for which Greg ultimately admits responsibility, and when Will romances Reva, a girlfriend of Greg's.
447	7	"Get It On"	May 28, 2008
Tension between Greg and Will continue, as with the others over Greg's cleanliness and continued pranks. This leads to an exchange of insults, threats, and thrown objects, and an intervention by the producers, who have Will leave the house for one night, before deciding that he and Dave must take anger management classes. The cast enjoys a visit to Joey in rehab, and are consulted as to how to support his recovery upon his return. The cast continues their improv performances.
448	8	"Arrival and Departure"	June 4, 2008
Joey returns home from rehab, but perceives his roommates as unsympathetic to his needs, as they refuse to abstain from drinking in his presence. Will meets Janelle Casanave from The Real World: Key West, whose connections may help his career, and to whom he is attracted. Brianna's attempts to resolve her legal troubles continue. Joey feels his lack of practice hurt his improv performance, but Charna insists that it was decent, and praises his courage in going on stage after coming back from rehab. She also implores the others to help Joey, invoking the memory of comedian Chris Farley, who was best friends with iO Artistic Director James Grace, and whose addictions killed him. Charna also fires Greg for missing yet another improv performance, and he is required to move out and leave the show per rules first implemented in Season 10. With his next improv performance, Joey finds his confidence increasing.
449	9	"Joey Checks Out"	June 11, 2008
Joey feels his struggle to remain sober may be threatened by a visit by his friend Mike, who first introduced him to cocaine. Sarah's attempt to help him is rebuffed, and Joey confesses to fearing failure in his career, and feeling depressed. Will introduces Brianna to a music producer who offers positive words of encouragement, but her mother worries about Brianna's lack of a backup plan. She also gets to sing with Alex Band of The Calling. Feeling that his return from rehab has not improved things, and realizing that he has lost interest in acting, Joey decides to move out, and return to Chicago. Before he leaves, he reads to the others the goodbye letter to alcohol that he wrote in rehab, which brings him to tears.
450	10	"In With The New"	June 18, 2008
Will's feelings for Janelle deepen as their relationship continues. She also introduces him and Dave to some of her friends from past Real World seasons. Alcohol threatens Dave's performance during an improv show. Nick and Brittini, the two new roommates, move in. Will and Brittini share a mutual attraction and enjoy flirting, much to Kimberly and Sarah's disapproval. Because of Janelle, however, their friendship experiences conflict. Dave gets the opportunity to experience hosting duties at the iO.
451	11	"Making It"	June 25, 2008
Alex Band's plans for Brianna don't mesh with her music, but other opportunities present themselves. Nick's late-night cavorting with a woman upsets Sarah and Kimberly. The three of them begin internships at Movies.com, whose producer, Brandon Schantz, is undergoing treatment for cancer, but who has high hopes for Nick, who becomes friends with him. Kimberly and Nick excel at interviewing moviegoers, but Sarah is disappointed with her performance, though she also gets work as a correspondent for think.mtv.com. She later drinks too much during a night out with the girls, resulting in nausea, and conflict between her and Nick. The roommates learn Brandon has died. Carson says he will help Nick with his career, but Nick is devastated.
452	12	"Mexi-Loco"	July 2, 2008
The cast vacations in Cancun, Mexico. Will tries and give his friendship with Brittini a chance, but escalating flirtation between the two leads to a passionate kiss, much to their subsequent regret. Brianna is angered by comments Sarah and Kimberly have made about her. Nick and Dave have one-night stands with two Canadian women. Janelle breaks up with Will after he confesses his infidelity, but after returning to Hollywood, Brittini holds off on telling her boyfriend, Jeremy, who visits the house. Dave tries to cheer Will up by taking him out, resulting in a foursome involving them and two women back at the house. Will later regrets this upon a call by Janelle, who agrees to try to renew their relationship. She later realized that she no longer saw him as she did when she first met him, and broke with up with him again, later learning that his activities went beyond a mere kiss when this episode aired.
453	13	"It's A Wrap"	July 9, 2008
As the cast's time in Hollywood comes to an end, they prepare for their final performance at the iO. In Chicago, Joey ponders what he has given up by leaving Hollywood, and is persuaded back to Hollywood to see their final show. Dave is attacked at a club, leading to an altercation involving his roommates, and a black eye for him. Brittini receives mixed feedback when she tries to sign with a new modeling agency. Nick, Kimberly and Sarah have an opportunity to interview Shanna Moakler for Entertainment Tonight, but Kimberly's interview does not go well. The roommates are elated to see Joey, and their final show goes well. After emotional farewells, one by one, the roommates leave the house.

== After filming ==
The Real World: Hollywood Reunion special was held live in Times Square on July 12, 2008, and was hosted by Lyndsey Rodrigues. All cast members appeared except for Greg, whose absence was not explained, but was the source of speculation. (Greg later indicated in an interview that he was upset over his eviction from the show, and would never again participate in a Bunim-Murray production.) Among the topics of discussion were Greg's behavior, Will's reasons for his confrontation with Greg in Episode 7, the attack on Dave in the final episode, Sarah's outspokenness, the conflict between Kimberly and Brianna concerning Brianna's lifestyle, Joey's alcoholism, the portrayal of his roommates' responsiveness to his struggle to remain sober, Nick and Brittini's experiences as the replacement roommates, and the various romantic and sexual relationships among the cast. Among the relationships discussed were Dave and Kimberly, Joey and Brianna, Sarah's revelation that she was now engaged, the triangle between Will, Janelle and Brittini, and the subsequent foursome involving Will, Dave and two women. Present during the taping was Janelle herself, who took to the stage to air her criticisms of Will's behavior.

=== Death of Joey Kovar ===
In January 2010, Joey Kovar, spurred by the impending birth of his and his girlfriend's child, appeared on the third season of Celebrity Rehab with Dr. Drew, where he sought help for his addiction to cocaine, ecstasy and alcohol. After completing treatment, he indicated that after helping his girlfriend, Nikki, move into their new home, he would get a sponsor, go to meetings, and go to a sober living facility. A year after his girlfriend gave birth to their son, Kovar's daughter was born. On August 17, 2012, 29-year-old Kovar was found dead at a friend's home near Chicago. Autopsy results were inconclusive, and the cause of death was pending a toxicological test as of August 18, though police stated that no foul play was indicated, and Kovar's brother, David, denied that drugs were the cause, as he stated that Kovar was maintaining his sobriety. The cause of death was later to be known as an opiate intoxication.

=== The Challenge ===
Cast member	Seasons of The Challenge
Brianna Taylor	The Ruins
Dave Malinosky	The Island
Greg Halstead	—N/a
Joey Kovar	—N/a
Kimberly Alexander	The Duel II, The Ruins
Sarah Ralston	—N/a
William Gilbert	—N/a
Brittini Sherrod	The Duel II
Nick Brown	The Duel II, The Ruins

== Ratings ==
For the first four weeks, the season posted a 2.5 rating among people 12-34, a 14% increase from the prior season-to-date. The season also saw growth among females 18-24 with a 6.1 rating, a 39% increase over the previous year. The season made MTV the #1 network for the Wednesday 10pm - 11pm time slot among people 12-34, exceeding even broadcast networks for the same demographic. As of May 13, 2008, the season reached 44 million viewers, 23 million of which are in the network's 12-34 target demographic core.
