= Sex Rehab with Dr. Drew =

- Starring: Drew Pinsky
- Country of origin: United States
- Original language: English
- No. of seasons: 1
- No. of episodes: 8

Production
- Executive producers: Dr. Drew Pinsky; Howard Lapides for Irwin Entertainment: John Irwin; Bruce Toms for VH1: Jeff Olde; Jill Holmes; Noah Pollack
- Running time: 60 min.
- Production companies: Irwin Entertainment, Inc. VH1

Original release
- Network: VH1
- Release: November 1 – December 20, 2009

Related
- Celebrity Rehab with Dr. Drew; Celebrity Rehab Presents Sober House

Sex Rehab with Dr. Drew is a VH1 reality television show that documents people being treated for sexual addiction by Dr. Drew Pinsky and his staff at the Pasadena Recovery Center in Pasadena, California. Premiering on November 1, 2009, Sex Rehab was a spin-off of Celebrity Rehab with Dr. Drew, in which Pinsky treats celebrities for substance abuse.

== Premise ==
Sex Rehab with Dr. Drew is a spinoff of Celebrity Rehab, in which celebrities who have substance addictions deal with their illness. Unlike its predecessor, this show specifically addresses sexual addiction. The participants live in a facility for 21 days with Dr. Drew Pinsky and Jill Vermeire providing daily one-on-one and group therapy sessions in order to address the psychological and psychiatric roots of their compulsive behavior.

== Cast ==
=== Staff ===
Drew Pinsky
Pinsky is the star of the show, and the lead specialist who treats the patients. A board-certified internist and addiction medicine specialist, he rose to fame as the host of the nationally syndicated radio talk show, Loveline, and star of Celebrity Rehab with Dr. Drew, of which Sex Rehab is a spinoff.
Jill Vermeire, MFT
A sex addiction therapist. She is a licensed Marriage and Family Therapist (MFC #41255) who received her Masters in Clinical Psychology at Pepperdine University.
Selma
Lead Technician. She was fired in Episode 6 following an altercation between her and patient Kari Ann Peniche.
Louis
Resident Technician.
John Sealy
A psychiatrist who appears in two episodes for one-on-one sessions with Kari Ann and Duncan. According to cast member Duncan Roy, he also acts as a consultant for the production.
Shelly Sprague
An alumna of Celebrity Rehab with Dr. Drew, Shelly is a Resident Technician who runs the floor, and a recovering addict herself. She met Pinsky through Bob Forrest, a fellow recovering addict and colleague of Drew's with whom Sprague used to do drugs. She runs a center at Las Encinas Hospital in Pasadena, California. Nicknamed "The Shark", she arrives in Episode 6 to replace Selma.

=== Patients ===
Jennifer Ketcham
Porn actress (Penny Flame)/director/businesswoman
James Lovett
Surfer/wakeboarder
Nicole Narain
Model/Playboy Playmate
Kari Ann Peniche
Beauty queen/model /fashion designer
Kendra Jade Rossi
Ex-porn star/music manager
Duncan Roy
Producer/writer/director
Amber Smith
Model/reality TV star/actress
Phil Varone
Musician/comedian

== Production ==
Patient Kari Ann Peniche's aggressive and erratic behavior marred her participation in the treatment program. She would verbally abuse the staff and other patients, refuse to participate in group discussions or obey rules, and voice various bizarre or paranoid ideations, such as people laughing at her when they apparently were not, and smiling uncontrollably even when angry or discussing very sad topics. Dr. Pinsky became suspicious that she was using illicit substances, or had been prior to being admitted, and the staff psychiatrist diagnosed her as having Borderline Personality Disorder, both of which require treatment before any treatment can be done for sexual addiction. She was eventually discharged involuntarily for failing to obey the rules. Pinsky offered her an alternative program at a psychiatric hospital nearby, but she angrily refused.

== Criticism ==
Drew Pinsky, producer John Irwin and Irwin Entertainment, which produce the show, have been criticized by addiction specialists in regard to Celebrity Rehab, from which Sex Rehab was spun off, for allegedly poor treatment techniques. With respect to Sex Rehab in particular, alumnus Duncan Roy has criticized the show's producers for prioritizing titillation and drama over rehabilitation for the patients in terms of casting, filming tactics and their editing choices, claiming that they instigated the behavior that resulted in Kari Ann Peniche's expulsion from the program in order to create a more watchable program. Roy has also questioned Pinsky's competence, saying that Jill Vermeire and Dr. John Sealy were his true source of therapeutic insight, and that while Pinsky is adept at treating drug and alcohol addiction, he is not knowledgeable in sex addiction, and merely repeated Vermeire's ideas. Roy further alleged that Sealy, whom Roy perceived as genuinely interested in helping sex addicts, confided in him that the producers had other motivations, and kept his involvement in the show minimal because he was not telegenic enough.

== Episodes ==
| No. | Title | Original release date |
|---|---|---|
| 1 | Episode 1 | November 1, 2009 |
Dr. Drew instructs the patients that, to encourage an environment conducive to rehabilitation for their addiction, sex, pornography, inappropriate dress, masturbation, seductive behavior, and touching (with the exception of handshakes) are prohibited, as are the use of computers and cell phones. Kendra, who finds separation from her husband difficult, questions whether she will be capable of committing successfully to these restrictions. Dr. Drew observes that the entire group is extremely fragile.
| 2 | Episode 2 | November 8, 2009 |
As treatment begins, Dr. Drew and Jill ask the patients about their backgrounds, learning about the patients' emotional, physical or sexual abuse, which is typical of sex addicts. Phil finds himself attracted to Amber. Dr. Drew observes that Kari Ann is resistant to treatment and the restrictions imposed on her, demanding to be allowed to go home, and having angry exchanges with Dr. Drew's staff. Dr. Drew suspects that she may be suffering from drug withdrawal, and is determined to keep her at the clinic until he can determine this. He also wonders if her erratic behavior is due to a psychiatric problem, but she walks out of the interview that Drew arranges with her and a staff psychiatrist.
| 3 | Episode 3 | November 15, 2009 |
Four days into treatment, the patients are becoming increasingly agitated, with the patients, Kendra in particular, annoyed at Kari Ann's refusal to awaken and participate in group sessions with the others, and their perception of the preferential treatment given to her. Drew and Jill have the women remove their makeup in order to experience their "true selves", but Kari Ann refuses to participate. Kendra, Nicole and Amber each have one-on-one sessions with Dr. Drew and Jill. Kari Ann writes an angry letter to Kendra, but Kendra returns it to her, explaining that it seems better suited as a letter for her. Feeling the others are against her, an emotional Kari Ann asks to speak with the staff.
| 4 | Episode 4 | November 22, 2009 |
As the patients begin their second full week at the clinic, Dr. Drew and Jill address the symptoms of withdrawal from sex from which the patients suffer, Jennifer and Phil in particular. The staff also employ art therapy to enable the group to express their troubles. James has a one-on-one with Dr. Drew, who observes that he has not been fully participating in the process. Kendra and Kari-Ann refuse to be in each other's presence, and Kendra expresses irritation with the others for not expressing similar feelings about Kari-Ann in her presence, despite doing so outside of it. Their tension continues during the first visit by the group's loved ones.
| 5 | Episode 5 | November 29, 2009 |
Dr. Drew and Jill take the women to participate in an art therapy program with Children of the Night, in which they express their trauma by decorating T-shirts, an exercise in which Kari Ann finally reveals much of herself. Without his female supporters around, Duncan, as the sole homosexual male, feels alienated and isolated, lashing out at Louis. Dr. Drew and Jill attempt another one-on-one session with Kari Ann. James makes an inappropriate comment to Jennifer that causes her great pain, and discomfort for the entire group after they learn about it.
| 6 | Episode 6 | December 6, 2009 |
The tension between James and Jennifer continues, with Phil feeling that he is caught in the middle. In a group session, Dr. Drew and Jill discusses objects that act as triggers, but James' comments irritate Duncan and Jennifer. An altercation between Kari Ann and Selma results in Selma's departure from the clinic, the arrival of Shelly Sprague as her replacement, and different reactions on the part of the others toward Kari Ann. The sudden death of Phil's maternal grandmother prompts Dr. Drew to have the grieving Phil and his father discuss the unresolved pain over the passing of Phil's mother eleven years ago. Kendra makes an emotional confession to Jennifer and Louis.
| 7 | Episode 7 | December 13, 2009 |
With graduation days away, the group ponders their lives after treatment. Dr. Drew and Jill talk to the group about what lies ahead for the group. Amber continues to explore issues stemming from her relationship with her late father. After further failures to obey the program's rules, Kari Ann is unwillingly discharged from the center. Despite Dr. Drew's attempts to refer her to Dr. Sealey, Kari Ann refuses his advice, and lashes out at him and the staff, including throwing a bottle of water onto Shelley. Kendra ponders her other addictions, and Jennifer, who is adamant that she will not return to the porn industry, considers her career options.
| 8 | Episode 8 | December 20, 2009 |
In the season finale, Drew and Jill discuss the patients' futures, and encourage them to participate in an intensive after care program in Beverly Hills at which Jill will be the primary therapist, but various members of the group are uncertain about this. Phil is uncertain of his ability to adhere to the restrictions Jill tells him will be placed on him. Kendra deals with the realization that she is an alcoholic, and recovering from this will affect her husband, Lukas. At the graduation ceremony, each patient is given a heartfelt testimonial from one of their fellow patients, and they each agree to the after care program, except for Nicole, who feels she isn't ready yet for the program, but agrees to an individual out patient program, and James, who feels that going back to work on an eight-month surfing tour will be the best therapy for him.

== After filming ==
Duncan Roy moved from his Malibu, California estate to a small Hollywood apartment, where he is co-star Jennifer Ketcham's neighbor.

Kari Ann Peniche appeared on the third season of Celebrity Rehab, during which it was confirmed that when entering the unit in Sex Rehab, she had smuggled speed in a teddy bear.

Peniche, Rossi and Ketcham later appeared on the second season of Sober House.

Ketcham, along with Pinsky, discussed her path into porn and her addictions to both sex and drugs, as well as her recovery, in a March 17, 2010 appearance on The View. She explained that she had taken a vow of abstinence for a year when she completed treatment, but that after nine months, she met a man with whom she was in a committed monogamous relationship, and who supported her recovery by attending meetings with her.

== See also ==
- Celebrity Rehab with Dr. Drew
- Celebrity Rehab Presents Sober House
