= Kari Ann Peniche =

American beauty pageant contestant (born 1984)

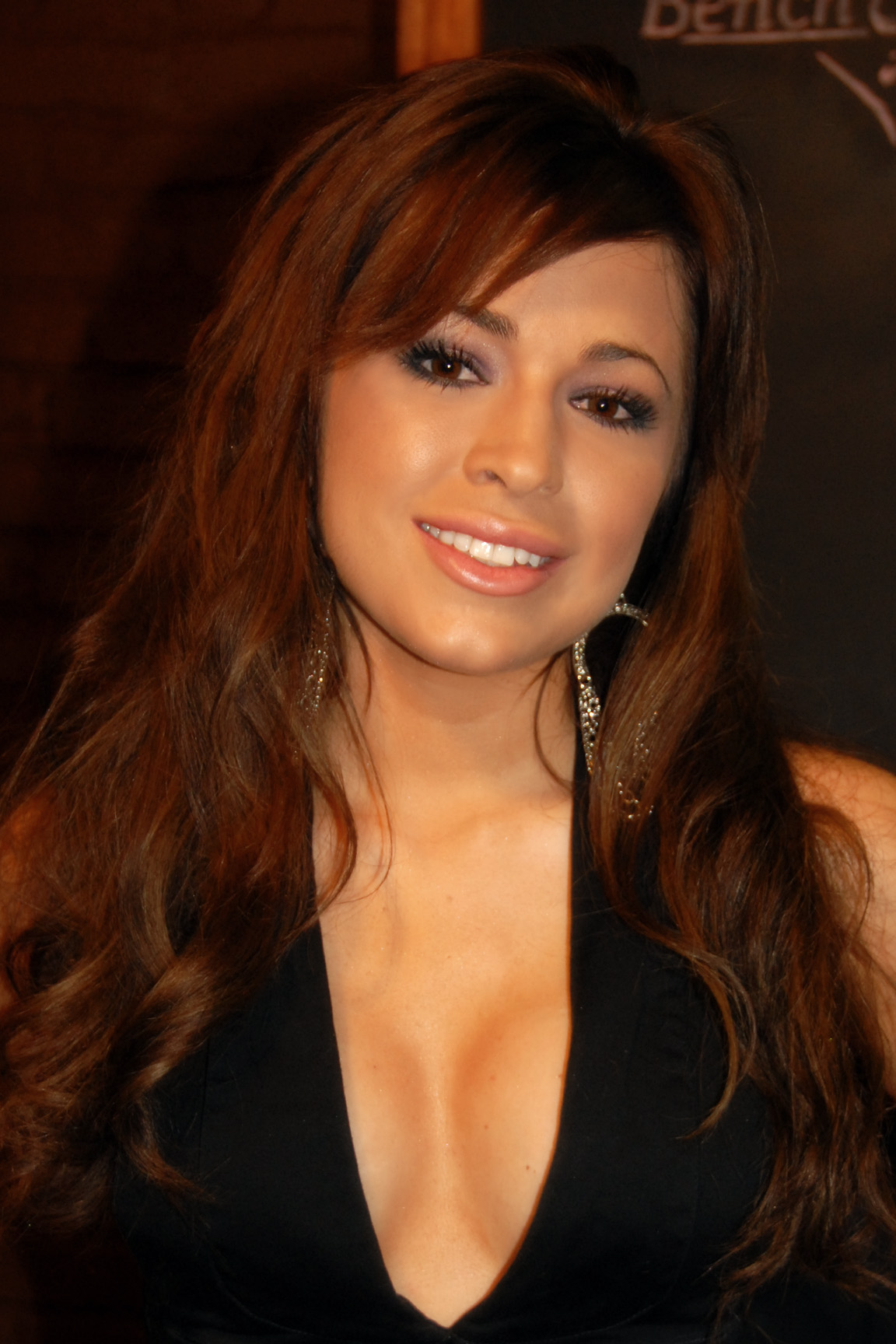
- Peniche in 2009
- Born: March 20, 1984 (age 42); San Diego, California, U.S.
- Spouse: Justin Williams (m. 2011; div. 2020)
- Children: 2
- Modeling information
- Height: 5 ft 4 in (1.63 m)
- Eye color: Brown

Kari Ann Peniche Williams (/pɛˈniːtʃeɪ/ peh-NEE-chay) (born March 20, 1984) is an American actress and entertainer from Fairview, Oregon. She has held the Miss Oregon Teen USA and Miss United States Teen titles. She was stripped of the latter title after appearing nude in the November 2004 issue of Playboy.

She has been the subject of several celebrity gossip stories, including a brief engagement to singer Aaron Carter, a quarrel with singer Mindy McCready, and the leak of a controversial home video involving actors Eric Dane and Rebecca Gayheart. She is also well known to television audiences for her appearances on the first season of Sex Rehab with Dr. Drew, the third season of Celebrity Rehab, and a brief appearance on the second season of Sober House.

== Early life and modeling career ==
Peniche has two younger brothers. She is of Portuguese and Spanish descent. After their parents divorced, the three siblings lived with their mother, who was an extreme perfectionist (especially about schoolwork). Peniche attended a modeling class at age twelve. After briefly moving the family to Houston, Texas, Peniche's mother remarried and moved them to a home on Blue Lake in Fairview, Oregon. At age 16, Peniche won a six-week contract to model in Korea. She returned for another six-week stint at age 18.

Peniche attended Portland Lutheran High School in Gresham, Oregon, where she was a cheerleader. She graduated in 2002, and later attended Portland State University and took classes through UCLA Extension. In a 2008 interview with Steppin' Out magazine, Peniche claimed that she was sexually abused as a minor, teenage model, and beauty queen; also physically abused by a former boyfriend.

== Career ==
Peniche won the Miss Oregon Teen USA 2002 title in November 2001. She competed in the Miss Teen USA 2002 pageant but did not place. At the end of her reign she crowned Tami Farrell as the new Miss Oregon Teen USA. The following year she represented Oregon in the Miss United States Teen pageant, which she won. She was crowned November 10, 2003, in Chapel Hill, North Carolina. Peniche was considered an unconventional pageant winner, for her fashion and career choices.

She was later stripped of her Miss United States Teen title after appearing nude in Playboy magazine. Peniche stated that she did not think there would be any issue; she claimed that nothing in her beauty pageant contract prohibited her from doing nude modeling, and the Playboy issue in question was not sold until after her reign had ended.

Peniche went on to host Xtreem, a Seattle-based, cable television program featuring local bands and extreme sports; and, the Boom Boom Huck Jam event. She acted in Small Change, an independent film produced in Seattle, and has appeared in other movies and TV shows. She also launched a line of bikinis called "Strung Out" at Portland Fashion Week.

== Personal life ==
In September 2006 Aaron Carter, then 18 years old, proposed to Peniche while they were onstage in Las Vegas, Nevada. They had known each other five days. Peniche, who had previously dated his older brother Nick, agreed. The engagement was broken off six days later.

On August 17, 2009, a home video was posted on the website Gawker showing Peniche with married actors Eric Dane and Rebecca Gayheart. All three are naked, though the video does not contain any sex acts. Though it is unknown how the video was made public, it had been stored on a hard drive that was the subject of a dispute between Peniche and Mindy McCready during their time on Celebrity Rehab.

Starting in November 2009, Peniche appeared as a patient on the VH1 reality television spinoff series, Sex Rehab with Dr. Drew (a documentary about the treatment process for sexual addiction patients [filmed in April 2009] at the Pasadena Recovery Center). Peniche described herself as having had hundreds of lovers, but being unable to emotionally connect with anyone in any kind of relationship. Peniche's participation in the treatment program was marred by her aggressive and erratic behavior: verbally abusing the staff and other patients; refusing to participate in group discussions, or obey the clinic's rules; forcefully demanding that the staff fetch her fruit juice and bring it to her bedside; accusing people of laughing at her when they clearly were not; and, compulsively smiling (as a beauty pageant contestant might, in order to maintain a facade of well-being) -- even when discussing her own past traumas and pain. Dr. Drew Pinsky, the treating physician, became suspicious that she was using illicit substances such as methamphetamine, or had been prior to being admitted. The PRC's staff psychiatrist diagnosed her as having borderline personality disorder (BPD). It was indicated that both the substance abuse and BPD had to be treated before any treatment for sexual addiction could begin. Eventually, Peniche was involuntarily discharged for failing to comply with the program's guidelines. She refused Pinsky's offer of an alternative program at a nearby psychiatric hospital, and during the process of being evicted from her home, she made suicidal gestures and became abusive toward the show's production staff (e.g., throwing a container of water onto a technician).

Later, during production of the third season of Celebrity Rehab, Peniche contacted Pinsky for help. Pinsky explained that her aggressive behavior during Sex Rehab was derived from drugs she smuggled into the PRC in her teddy bear; and, were difficult to detect during drug testing because of the medication Peniche took for attention deficit disorder. Pinsky went to her residence, where Peniche showed him the crystal meth she was using. She was shown returning to the Pasadena Recovery Center at the end of that season's fourth episode. Executive producer John Irwin claimed that her behavior changed by her second appearance, although she did allegedly punch a cameraman, at one point. In her second stint at the Pasadena Recovery Center, Peniche again exhibited some problematic behaviors (including conflict with the staff and other patients, plus again violating facility rules); however, she did complete the program.

Peniche joined the cast of Celebrity Rehab Presents Sober House, in which she transferred into a sober living facility (often an interim step between rehab, and returning to society). In the first episode, she became verbally abusive toward the sober living manager (Jennifer Gimenez), and tested positive for methamphetamine. During the second episode, admitted being worried that her former Rehab co-star, Mindy McCready (whom Peniche had invited to move in with her at the end of their season on Rehab—an idea that Dr. Pinsky openly opposed) had access to sensitive materials on Peniche's computer. (It was later reported that the two argued over money, and, an accusation over a stolen hard drive [containing the nude video featuring Peniche, Eric Dane, and Rebecca Gayheart]). As Peniche was being filmed returning home to address this matter, she punched a cameraman in the eye, and was evicted from the sober living facility. A few days later, Head Counselor Bob Forrest brought Peniche back to the facility to see if the residents would accept her return; but, (with the exception of co-patient/-resident Tom Sizemore), the residents declined Peniche's in-person plea to return, and she left amid stinging criticism by Heidi Fleiss.

Peniche wed Justin Williams in February 2011 in Los Angeles, California and they have two children together, a son and a daughter. Their marriage has been strained, reportedly due to Peniche's behavior, both past and present; her husband has made allegations of infidelity against her and of child abuse, saying a hair follicle test showed she'd exposed their then 10-month-old son to methamphetamine.

Kari and her family survived a fire that destroyed their home on November 5th at her Oregon home. It was caused by numerous overheated e-bike batteries exploding.

Preceded by Sarah Warner	Miss Oregon Teen USA; 2002	Succeeded by Tami Farrell
