= Laws of Deception =

1997 film by Joey Travolta

- Directed by: Joey Travolta
- Written by: Rollin Jarrett
- Produced by: David E. Ornston; Richard Salvatore; Joey Travolta
- Starring: C. Thomas Howell; James Russo; Amber Smith; Brian Austin Green; Robert Miano; Nick Mancuso; John Landis
- Cinematography: Dan Heigh
- Edited by: Rich Cowan
- Music by: Jeff Lass
- Production companies: Eternity Pictures; Two Sticks Productions
- Distributed by: Peachtree Entertainment
- Release date: March 8, 1997
- Running time: 98 min.
- Country: United States
- Language: English

Laws of Deception is an erotic suspense thriller film produced in 1997. Written by Rollin Jarrett and directed by Joey Travolta, it stars C. Thomas Howell, James Russo, Amber Smith, Nick Mancuso and Brian Austin Green.

== Plot synopsis ==
A young man, Evan Marino, witnessed the murder of his mob-connected parents when he was a child. Evan has grown up to become a top law student and justice has become his religion. He has but one goal, which is to become the number one criminal lawyer in Miami. A beautiful and mysterious woman Elise Talbot enters Evan's life and unbeknownst to him, has been hired by his parents’ murderer, Gino Carlucci, to uncover what he remembers. As the truth about his past is revealed, Evan finds himself caught in a tangled web of lies and twisted motivations, not the least of which are his own. Evan eventually discovers that his best friend Cal Miller sleeps with his former lover Elise after school.

Elise later marries Gino, who is later killed, making her the prime suspect. She proclaims her innocence and implicates Cal, who becomes an alcoholic because of his past relationship with Elise. Cal commits suicide and Evan becomes convinced that Elise murdered Gino so he no longer represents her in the case. As she is found guilty, the final twist reveals that Evan killed Gino as revenge for killing his parents.

== Cast ==
- C. Thomas Howell as Evan Marino
  - Dakota Brinkman as Young Evan Marino
- Brian Austin Green as Cal Miller
- James Russo as Gino Carlucci
- Amber Smith as Elise Talbot
- Robert Miano as Raymond Kelsey
- Nick Mancuso as Sergeant Lou Mather
- Bo Brinkman as J.W.
- John Landis as Judge Trevino
- Sam Travolta as Jury President
- Rollin Jarrett as Mr. Farina
- Krista Tesreau as Ms. Himes
- Jackie Debatin as Maria
- Barry Heins as Morris Harland
- Ray Martino as Mr. Marino
- Michelle Mitchell as Mrs. Marino
- David E. Ornston as Mr. Dunn
- Paul Sampson as Tony
- Blumer Tracy as Willie
- Olivia Maxwell as Tammi
- Roger Roberge II as D.J.
- David Snedeker as Vaht
- Christopher Janney as Mac
- Scott Carr as Professor
- Molly Ann Lashinsky as Cocktails
- David Lewis as Bob
- Kena Land as Hotel Prostitute
- Tiffany Fraser as Street Prostitute
- Bruce Mercury as Thug #1
- Chris Howell as Thug #2
- Nicholas Hill as Thug #3
- David "Shark" Fralick as Thug #4
