= Rachel Uchitel =

American media personality (born 1975)

- Born: January 30, 1975 (age 51); Anchorage, Alaska, U.S.
- Occupations: Media personality; journalist; crisis management consultant; podcast host
- Known for: Photographed in 9/11 aftermath; Affair with Tiger Woods
- Spouses: Steven Ehrenkranz (m. 2004; div. 2004) Matt Hahn (m. 2011; div. 2014) Don Donovan (m. 2025)
- Children: 1
- Website: missunderstoodpodcast.com

Rachel Uchitel (/ˈjuːkɪtɛl/ YOO-kih-tell; born January 30, 1975) is an American media personality, journalist, crisis management consultant, and podcast host. She first drew national attention in 2001 when a photo of her searching for her fiancé, who perished in the World Trade Center during the September 11 attacks, appeared on the front page of the New York Post, which was republished worldwide. Uchitel was thrust into the spotlight in 2009, when she was the first of what became numerous women to attract international coverage for having an affair with married golfer Tiger Woods.

Prior to the breaking story of her sexual relationship with Woods, she had worked as a television producer at Bloomberg News and had been a director of VIP management at some of the country's most exclusive nightclubs. In 2010, she appeared in the fourth season of the American reality television series Celebrity Rehab with Dr. Drew. In the years that followed, Uchitel has spoken about the high personal cost of public shaming and nondisclosure agreements (NDAs).

== Early life ==
Uchitel is the daughter of Robert N. Uchitel and the granddaughter of Maurice Uchitel; her paternal grandfather was a restaurant and nightclub owner born in the Russian Empire. In the United States, he owned several establishments in the 1950s and 1960s, including the El Morocco nightclub. Her surname Uchitel (Russian: Учитель, [ʊˈt͡ɕʲitʲɪlʲ]) means 'teacher' in Russian and several other Slavic languages.

At the age of 13, her family turned to the troubled teen industry to help manage Uchitel, sending her to CEDU School in Running Springs, California, where she claims she was made to dig a grave with a spoon and then lie in it. Several years later, CEDU would be shut down after losing several lawsuits for battery, neglect, racketeering, invasion of privacy, and child abuse.

In 1990, her father died of a cocaine overdose. According to Uchitel, her father's death required her to mature quickly and was one of the incidents in her life that led to her own addictions later.

She graduated from Millbrook School in 1992 and graduated from the University of New Hampshire in 1996 with a degree in psychology. She spent five years after college as a news producer in New York for Bloomberg Television.

== Career ==
=== Television ===
Uchitel began her career after college working in television and film, with a five-year stint as a producer in the Bloomberg News television division, a period in which she became "engaged to a man who died in the 9/11 attacks." Uchitel has served as a special correspondent on nightlife for Extra.

=== VIP hosting ===
In 2005, Uchitel moved to Las Vegas and, by the following year, was a VIP hostess at Tao Asian Bistro, whose ownership included occasional boyfriend Jason Strauss. She said, "In a random career move and a life-changing experience, I found myself living in Las Vegas to launch Tao nightclub and restaurant.... Two years later, I was back in New York to oversee VIP operations for all of their companies and venues, such as Stanton Social, Marquee, Tao Bistro, and Dune. Uchitel ran the VIP section of "some of the most successful clubs in New York." As of 2009, Uchitel was living in Las Vegas but self-described as "too old for being a VIP host anymore".

=== Other endeavors ===
In December 2013, Uchitel opened a children's boutique on the Upper West Side of Manhattan. The store was named Wyatt Lily after her 2-year-old daughter and was named "Best Kids Birthday Presents" in New York magazine's annual Best Of issue in 2015. It has since closed down.

Uchitel is the host of the podcast Miss Understood with Rachel Uchitel, which features interviews with public figures who have been the focus of media coverage.

=== Media appearances ===
Uchitel was a cast member in the fourth season of the VH1 reality television program Celebrity Rehab with Dr. Drew which documents notable persons being treated for substance abuse – in her case, alcohol, opiates, and benzodiazepines. Dr. Drew Pinsky, who normally is not involved with casting for the series reportedly visited Uchitel personally in order to convince her to be cast on the show, for which she was paid US$500,000 (equivalent to $748,000 in 2025) to appear – double the amount initially offered to her by producers.

== Personal life ==
Uchitel, then 26, had been engaged to James Andrew O'Grady, age 32, a managing director of Sandler O'Neill, when O'Grady was killed in the September 11 attacks of the World Trade Center. A few days later she appeared on the front page of the New York Post holding a picture of O'Grady, which was republished worldwide. Uchitel and her fiancé's family subsequently debated the disposition of his estate.

In 2004, Uchitel married Wall Street trader and childhood friend Steven Ehrenkranz. Their marriage lasted four months.

In late 2009, The National Enquirer published a story that alleged that Uchitel had had an affair with Tiger Woods at the Australian Masters. At the time, Uchitel denied the allegations to the Associated Press. However, she subsequently admitted in the 2021 HBO miniseries Tiger that she did have an affair with Woods.

In 2010, actor David Boreanaz admitted to having an affair with Uchitel.

On October 2, 2011, she married insurance underwriter and former Penn State fullback Matt Hahn, who is ten years her junior. In May 2012, Uchitel gave birth to a daughter. Hahn filed for divorce from Uchitel in 2013. The divorce was finalized in January 2014.

In March 2025, she announced her engagement to Dan Donovan, the founder of two security companies.
