= Jennifer Gimenez =

American model and actress

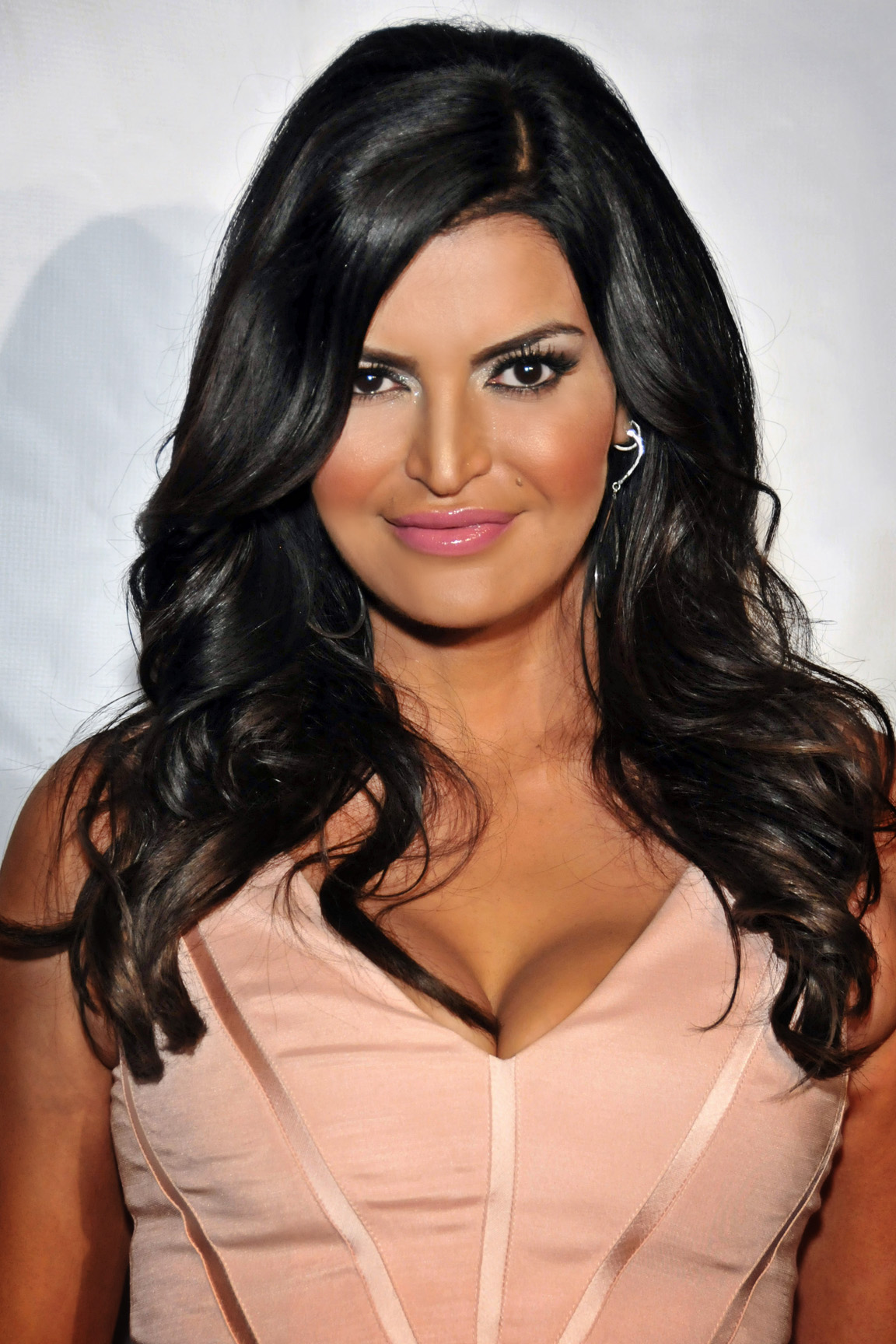
- Jennifer Gimenez in Hollywood, California on March 28, 2013
- Occupation(s): Actress, model

Jennifer Gimenez is an American model, actress, reality television personality, and addiction recovery advocate. She has appeared in music videos for Tupac Shakur, Babyface and Mick Jagger, in films such as Blow, Vanilla Sky, The Sweetest Thing, and Charlie's Angels: Full Throttle, and on TV shows such as The Bold and the Beautiful and Karen Sisco. She ranked 77 on Maxim magazine's 2001 Hot 100 list.

She has appeared as the sober living House Manager for the VH1 reality television series, Sober House, a spinoff of Celebrity Rehab with Dr. Drew, on which she has appeared as a rehab technician at the Pasadena Recovery Center. She has also made guest appearances in the first five seasons of Bravo's The Real Housewives of Beverly Hills.

== Early life ==
Gimenez, who is of Argentinean descent, was born in the United States, but lived in Argentina, until she moved back to the United States at the age of six. Her mother's name is Nelida, and a brother named Dwight. Gimenez was discovered by photographer Bruce Weber at the age of 13, while she was enjoying an afternoon with her family at the Santa Monica Pier. Webber thought the 5 ft 6 in (168 cm) Gimenez, who "hadn’t really developed", as she recalls, would make a good model.

== Career ==
Gimenez was the youngest model to appear on the cover of American Elle. Her appearances includes covers of magazines such as Vogue and Marie Claire, and in ad campaigns for brands including Calvin Klein, Guess, St. John, and Paul Mitchell. She also did international runway work for designers including Chanel, Armani, Jean Paul Gaultier, Carolina Herrera, and Prada.

As her image as a sex symbol developed, she was named to Maxim "Hot 100", and Esquire's "Women We Love". This led to appearances in music videos for Mick Jagger, Prince, Tupac Shakur, Lionel Richie, and Babyface. Her television acting credits include the soap opera The Bold and the Beautiful, on which she played a model for Forrester Creations from 1993 to 1997. Her first major film role was in Ted Demme's Blow. She followed this with roles in Vanilla Sky and Corky Romano, and Charlie's Angels: Full Throttle.

Her reality television work, addition to Sober House and Celebrity Rehab (see below) had included appearances on in the first two seasons of Bravo's The Real Housewives of Beverly Hills, Celebrity Wife Swap, The O'Neal's Show on OWN, as a judge on SiTV's Model Latina, as an expert consultant on shows such as The View, Today, and E! News, and on shows on other networks including CNN and HLN.

== Addiction and sobriety ==
In becoming a professional model, Gimenez became her family's provider, though this soon brought pressures, such as being encouraged to take sick days from school in order to lose weight. She also spent up to five hours at the gym and starved herself in order to accomplish this, and this eventually led to substance abuse.

Gimenez took her first drink at age 12, but eventually graduated to cocaine after she became a model. She began trying to quit drugs at age 21, but achieved only intermittent success over the course of the next 13 years. The sporadic nature of her sobriety changed when her mother and a friend convinced her to go to Las Encinas Hospital in Pasadena, California, where she came under the care of Dr. Drew Pinsky. Although she checked in for a five-day detox program, she ended up staying for nine and a half months. After finishing her treatment, she was taken aback when instructed to abstain from sex and relationships for a year, though she found that the 102 pounds she gained after quitting drugs facilitated this resolution, and allowed her to, as she put it, "find the inner foundation" that she had been denied when she became a working professional at age 14. During her View appearance, she stated that she was sober for "four years and a few months".

Though Gimenez had never worked professionally in recovery, Drew Pinsky felt she was well-suited to the task of running the sober living facility depicted on Sober House, explaining, "Sober houses are often run by recently sober people. She was a tough patient that I thought could really relate to this group. And she’s an actress, so I thought it was a perfect match." Though Gimenez was surprised by the offer, and self-conscious about appearing on camera due to her weight, she accepted in order to further her own recovery process. Since the first season of the series, she lost 100 pounds, and returned to going from a size 16 back to a size 6. She became good friends with fellow recovering addict Andy Dick, and expressed the intent to resume acting.

Gimenez has also worked as a rehab technician at the Pasadena Recovery Center, as seen on Celebrity Rehab with Dr. Drew, beginning with that show's fifth season.

She also works as a public speaker on the subject of substance abuse and mental health awareness with her husband, Tim Ryan, who was the subject of A&E's 2017 documentary miniseries on addiction, Dope Man. In 2019 she appeared in a cover story of Recovery Today Magazine.

== Personal life ==
Gimenez stated in a February 2009 interview that she was in relationship, and that her boyfriend was also a recovering addict.

In June 2020, Gimenez became engaged to her partner, Tim Ryan. They married on December 31, 2020 in a private Beverly Hills ceremony. In so doing, she became the stepmother of Ryan's daughter, MacKenzie, who was in attendance with Gimenez's mother, Nelida.
