= Jaimee Foxworth =

American actress and model

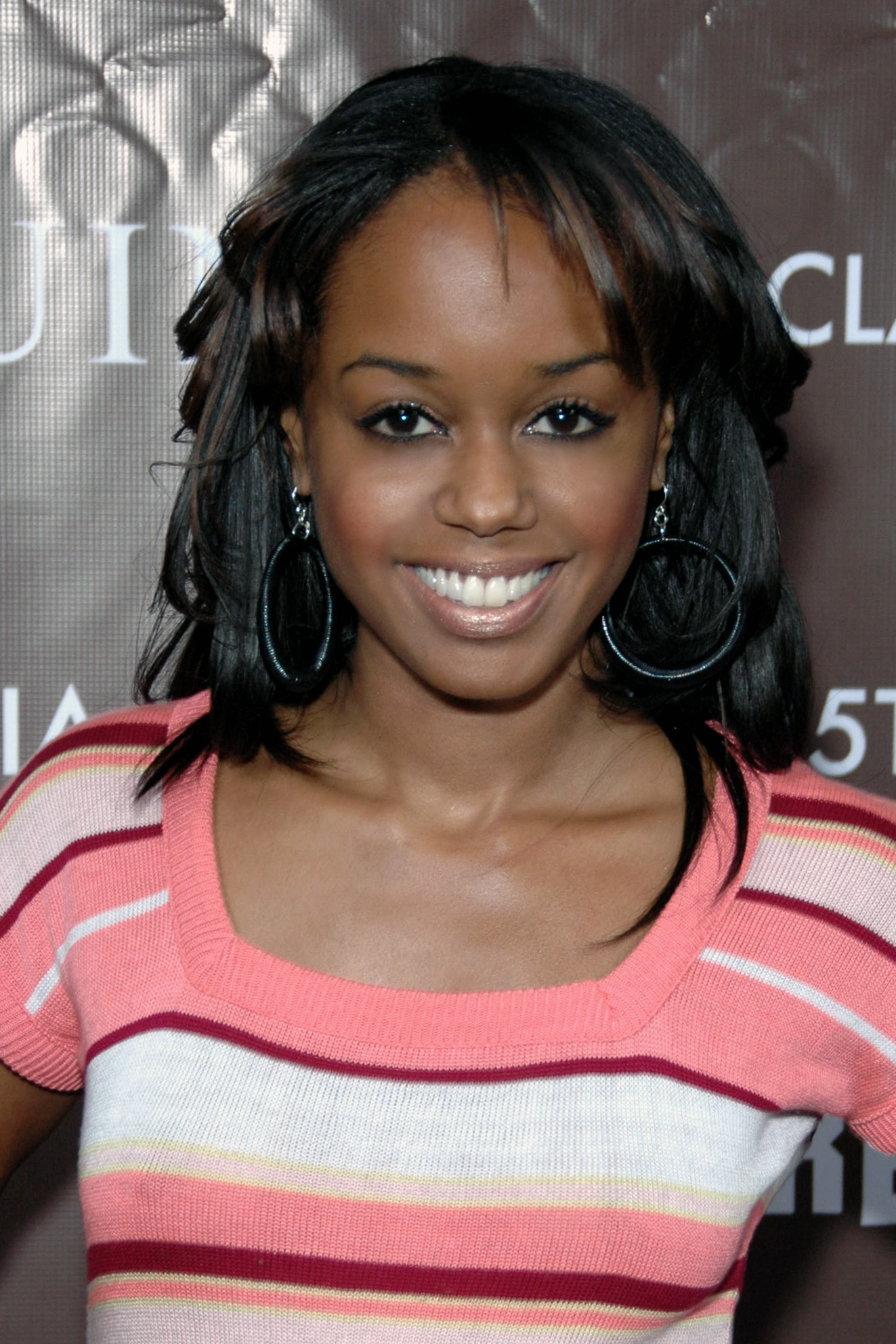
- Foxworth in 2008
- Born: 1979 (age 46–47); Belleville, Illinois, U.S.
- Occupations: Actress; model; singer
- Years active: 1986–present
- Known for: Judy Winslow – Family Matters (1989–1993)
- Children: 1

Jaimee Foxworth (born 1979) is an American actress, model, singer and former pornographic film actress. She is best known for her role of Judy Winslow, the daughter of Carl and Harriette Winslow on the ABC sitcom Family Matters, during the show's first four seasons.

== Life and career ==
Jaimee Monae Foxworth was born in Belleville, Illinois. Her early television credits included appearances on Amen and TV 101. She began modeling at the age of five and soon appeared in national television advertisements, and ultimately landed the role of Judy Winslow, the youngest of the Winslow family's three children, on the long-running situation comedy Family Matters. After the introduction of Steve Urkel (Jaleel White), Foxworth's scenes on the show were reduced significantly. The combination of the character having little to do on the show and budget cuts caused producers to eliminate her from the series after its fourth season. The character disappeared without explanation, with the Winslows acknowledging only two children: Eddie (Darius McCrary) and Laura (Kellie Shanygne Williams). Jo Marie Payton, who played matriarch Harriette Winslow, was particularly upset with Foxworth's dismissal, stating that producers had decided "nobody would notice" Judy was gone.

Foxworth formed an R&B musical group, S.H.E., with her two sisters (Tyren Perry and Jania Perry). They released their debut album 3's a Charm on July 1, 1997, through Shaquille O'Neal's T.W.IsM./Interscope Records. Facing financial difficulty at age 19, Foxworth began performing in pornographic films.

== Personal life ==
According to HuffPost, Foxworth struggled with drug and alcohol use after leaving the adult film industry. In 2008, she appeared on Celebrity Rehab. In 2009, People magazine reported that Foxworth and longtime boyfriend Michael Shaw had a child. Also in 2009, the TV One series Life After chronicled Foxworth's story, dealing with her departure from Family Matters and her later use of marijuana.

== Filmography ==
- Family Matters (1989–1993) TV series

=== TV guest appearances ===
- Celebrity Rehab with Dr. Drew
- The Tyra Banks Show October 6, 2006
- The Oprah Winfrey Show January 29, 2006
- 20/20 April 29, 2005
- TV 101 playing Whitney Hines in episode: "Home" (episode #1.4) December 20, 1988
- Amen playing Choir in episode: "Your Christmas Show of Shows" (episode #1.11) December 20, 1986
