= James Lovett =

American surfer

- Born: September 4, 1986 (age 39); Newport Beach, California, U.S.
- Other names: Jaime
- Occupations: surfer, skimboarder and wakeboarder
- Height: 6 ft 2 in (1.88 m)
- Website: James Lovett on Myspace

James "Jaime" Lovett (born September 4, 1986) is an American professional surfer, skimboarder and wakeboarder. His forays into board sports began with surfing when he was 10 years old. Lovett went professional at age 14 which led him to compete and receive awards in many events. Lovett won his first event in 2004 by coming first in the Centurion World Wake Surfing Championships. In 2009, Lovett was a patient on Sex Rehab with Dr. Drew.

In 2007, Lovett was among the four finalists in the Flow Tour National Championships with Jeff Ranta, Tyler McIntyre and Greg Lazarus. He defeated them to become the Flow Tour Expert Standup Champion. The following year he won the event Oktoberfest!

Born in Newport Beach, California, Lovett's American parents raised him in Mexico's Cabo San Lucas since he was 2 months old. As a result, Lovett is bilingual in Spanish and English.
