= Joey Kovar =

American model and reality star (1983–2012)

- Kovar on Celebrity Rehab with Dr. Drew
- Born: July 24, 1983; Evergreen Park, Illinois, United States
- Died: August 17, 2012 (aged 29); Chicago Ridge, Illinois, United States
- Occupations: Model, reality star

Joseph Eugene Kovar (July 24, 1983 – August 17, 2012) was an American model and reality television star and bodybuilder who first appeared in the twentieth season of MTV's The Real World, The Real World: Hollywood, in 2008.

In 2010, Kovar appeared as a patient on the VH1 reality show, Celebrity Rehab with Dr. Drew, for treatment of addictions to alcohol, cocaine, ecstasy, methamphetamines, and steroids.

== Early life ==
Kovar was a native of Evergreen Park, Illinois, where he continued to reside after appearing on The Real World: Hollywood and other shows. He battled addiction to alcohol and other drugs before appearing in television.

== Career ==
Kovar, a former personal trainer, was discovered at age 24 by a talent scout on a Chicago street. In 2008, Kovar was cast in the twentieth season of the long-running MTV series, The Real World. Kovar believed he was cast for The Real World: Hollywood due to his personality and openness about past partying and drug use. In a 2009 interview with the Chicago Tribune, Kovar elaborated, "We kind of have an 'I don't give a [bleep]' attitude. What you see is what you get...People want edgy. People want attitude. People want in-your-face, and that's what Chicagoans bring. The attitude we have is what's going to draw the ratings." Kovar became increasingly addicted to alcohol and other drugs while filming The Real World. Due to erratic behavior and substance abuse, he was asked to leave the show to pursue treatment.

Kovar next appeared in the third season of Celebrity Rehab with Dr. Drew, which premiered in November 2009. Other cast members for the season included Dennis Rodman, Mackenzie Phillips, and Heidi Fleiss. On the show, he was treated for addictions to alcohol, cocaine, ecstasy, methamphetamine, and steroids. In an on-camera discussion about his addiction to cocaine with Dr. Drew Pinsky, the show's host and addiction medicine specialist, at the end of the season Kovar stated, "I want this, but at the same time, I'm not going to make any false...promises...I'm not going to tell you. 'I'm going to be sober', 'cause I don't know."

== Death ==
Kovar died of an opiate intoxication on August 17, 2012, at the age of 29. He was discovered with blood coming out of his nose and ears at an apartment building in the 9800 block of South Sayre Avenue in Chicago Ridge, Illinois. Kovar was pronounced dead at the scene shortly before 9 a.m. An initial autopsy proved inconclusive. Kovar's family stated there were no signs of alcohol or other drugs found in his system, and believed he had been sober for approximately six months while he pursued acting, but a later autopsy indicated that Kovar succumbed to "opiate intoxication".

He became the third former Real World cast member to die, 18 years following the death of Pedro Zamora of Real World: San Francisco and five years following the death of Frankie Abernathy of Real World: San Diego. Kovar was one of three cast members from Season 3 of Celebrity Rehab with Dr. Drew to die, including Mike Starr and Mindy McCready, and is among seven cast members overall from Celebrity Rehab with Dr. Drew who have died, a list that further includes Chyna who appears in season 1, Rodney King who was featured in season 2, Jeff Conaway who appeared in seasons 1 and 2, and Jason Davis who appeared in season 4.
