= Amber Smith =

Actress and model

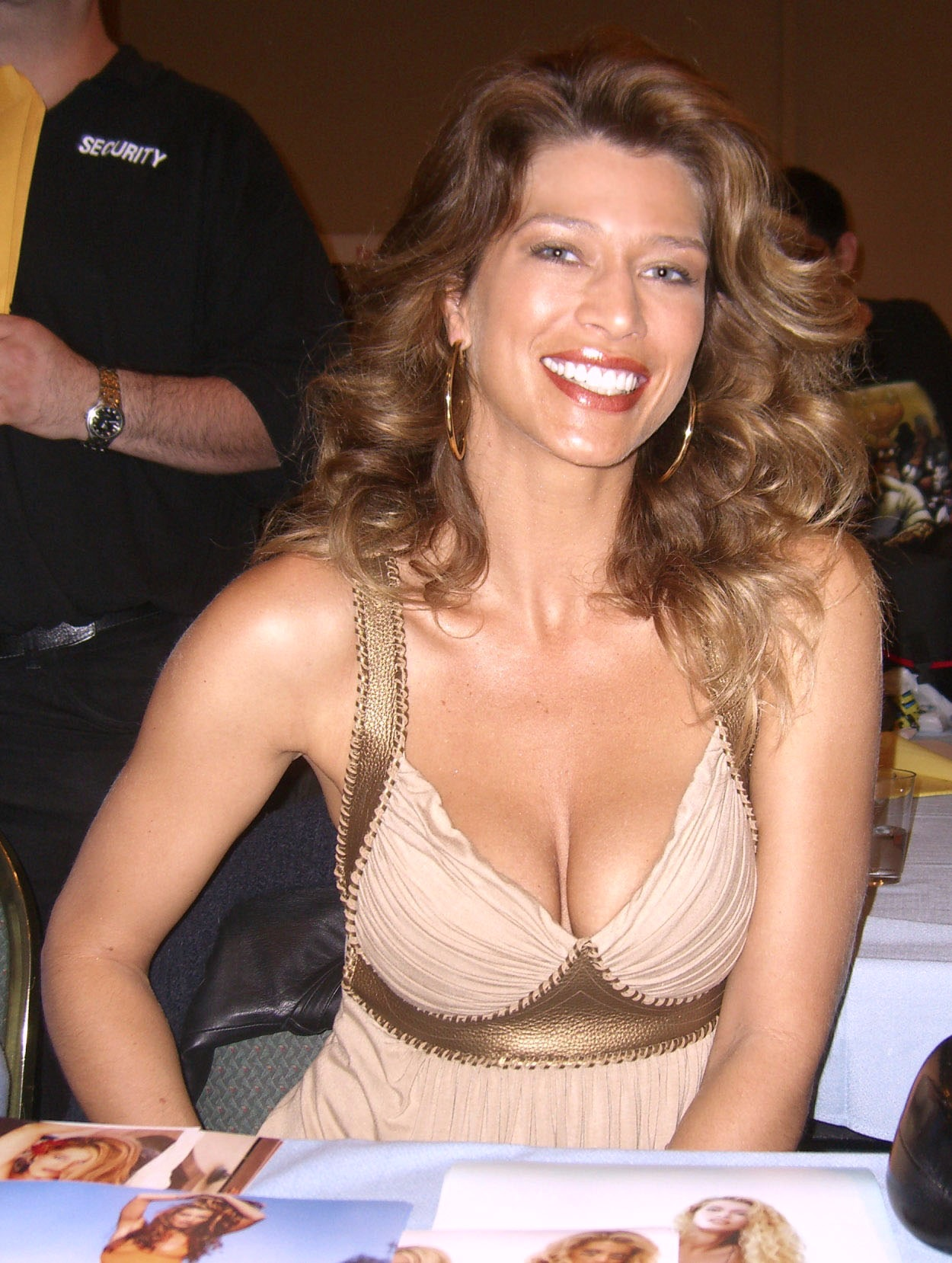
- Smith at the Big Apple Summer Sizzler in Manhattan, June 13, 2009
- Modeling information
- Height: 5 ft 10.5 in (179 cm)

Amber Smith is an American actress and former model.

== Early life ==
Amber Smith is the daughter of Carol Smith. During her 2008 and 2009 appearances on the reality television programs in which she sought treatment by Dr. Drew Pinsky for addiction, she stated that both her father and mother had long histories with addiction. In the third episode of Sex Rehab with Dr. Drew, she stated that her father died as a result of a drinking problem, and that while he was absent during much of her childhood, she was still devastated by his death.

== Career ==
=== Modeling ===
Smith started modeling by age 16. As a teenager she was represented by Irene Marie Models in Miami Beach and traveled to Paris, France, where she worked as a model throughout Europe for four years. Her breakthrough came when her naturally blonde hair was dyed red, giving her a strong resemblance to 1940s and 1950s movie star Rita Hayworth. Smith appeared in back-to-back issues of the 1993 & 1994 Sports Illustrated Swimsuit Issue, and became Esquire magazine's first Vargas Girl of the 1990s. She also became the first model of the Wonderbra campaign. She later posed for photographer Helmut Newton for a Wolford advertising campaign, and was the model for the 2002 lingerie campaign for Venus Victoria, the European sister company to Victoria's Secret.

Smith has appeared on the covers of the fashion magazines and women's magazines Vogue, Elle, Cosmopolitan, Marie Claire, MAX (Australian and French editions) and YM. She was the cover girl for the March 1995 issue of Playboy. She was photographed by Clifford Wright for Maxim and Ocean Drive. She has appeared in advertising for L'Oréal makeup, Buffalo Jeans, Camel cigarettes, Kahlúa liqueur, Volkswagen automobiles, and Panama Jack, among others, and has walked the runway for such fashion designers as Chanel and Jean Paul Gaultier.

=== Acting ===
Smith was cast in her first film role in Paul Mazursky's Faithful, on a referral from Robert De Niro that stemmed from her Casino auditions. She also appeared in The Funeral, directed by Abel Ferrara, and Barbra Streisand's The Mirror Has Two Faces. She played Susan Lefferts, a Rita Hayworth lookalike, in Curtis Hanson's L.A. Confidential. Smith's resemblance to Hayworth came into play again with a role in HBO's cable telefilm The Rat Pack. She also had a role in American Beauty. Her biggest role to date has been as the star of the Cinemax TV series Sin City Diaries, which debuted in 2007. She played Angelica, a Las Vegas entertainment consultant who plans activities for casinos' high-roller guests.

=== Reality television appearances ===
Smith appeared as a cast member during the second season of the VH1 television show Celebrity Rehab, which depicted her 16-year struggle with opiate and alcohol addiction. She subsequently appeared in the 2009 series Sober House, a Celebrity Rehab spin-off focusing on a sober living environment. That same year, she appeared in the VH1 series Sex Rehab with Dr. Drew. During these appearances, she recounted hers and her mother's histories with addiction and co-dependency, which began when Smith was a teenager, and how her experiences with date rape and prostitution played a part in those addictions.

That same year, Smith and other alumni of Celebrity Rehab appeared as panel speakers to a new group of addicts at the Pasadena Recovery Center. Her appearance, which marked a year and a half of sobriety for her, was aired in the third-season episode "Triggers".

== Personal life ==
In a January 2010 TV Guide story on Celebrity Rehab, Dr. Drew Pinsky stated she was living with her mother in Los Angeles, and "doing stupendous work ... She's someone who reaches out and is an inspiration and of service to other patients."

=== Legal matters ===
Smith's name surfaced in connection with the January 2008 bankruptcy of the entertainment payroll firm Axium. A lawsuit alleged the company's partners misused funds by renting a Los Angeles, California apartment for Smith, paying for her car and issuing "numerous large payments" to Smith, which they explained by calling her a "consultant" to the company.

== Filmography ==
Film
Year	Film	Role	Notes
1996	Faithful	Debbie	
1996	The Funeral	Bridgette	
1996	The Mirror Has Two Faces	Felicia on video	
1997	Laws of Deception	Elise Talbot	
1997	Lowball	Paula	
1997	Sleeping Together	Cathy	
1997	Red Shoe Diaries 7: Burning Up	Alia	Segment: "Runway"
1997	Private Parts	Julie	
1997	L.A. Confidential	Susan Lefferts	
1997	Def Jam's How to Be a Player	Amber	
1998	Mars	Sheila	
1999	American Beauty	Christy Kane	
2000	Deception	Vanessa Rio	
2000	The Midnight Hour	Alex	Alternative titles: In the Midnight Hour & Tell Me No Lies
2000	Dirk and Betty	Beautiful Canyon Girl	
2001	Reasonable Doubt	Charlie	Alternative titles: Crime Scene & The Baptist
2001	Tomcats	Gorgeous Redhead	
2001	How High	Professor Garr	
2002	New Suit	Jennifer	
2003	Dead End	Lady in White	
Television
Year	Title	Role	Notes
1992	Inferno		Television movie
1993–1995	Red Shoe Diaries	The Model	2 episodes
1997	Head Over Heels	Rachel	1 episode
1997	Friends	Maria the Gym Lady	Episode: "The One with the Ballroom Dancing"
1997	Just Shoot Me!	Herself	Episode: "Sweet Charity"
1998	The Rat Pack	Broad at casino	Television movie
1998	V.I.P.	Davina	Episode: "Beats Working at a Hot Dog Stand"
1998	Pacific Blue	Diane Verne	1 episode
1999	Silk Stalkings	Virginia	2 episodes
2007	Sin City Diaries	Angelica	13 episodes
2010	Lingerie	Giovanna	13 episodes
