= Brianna Taylor =

American musician

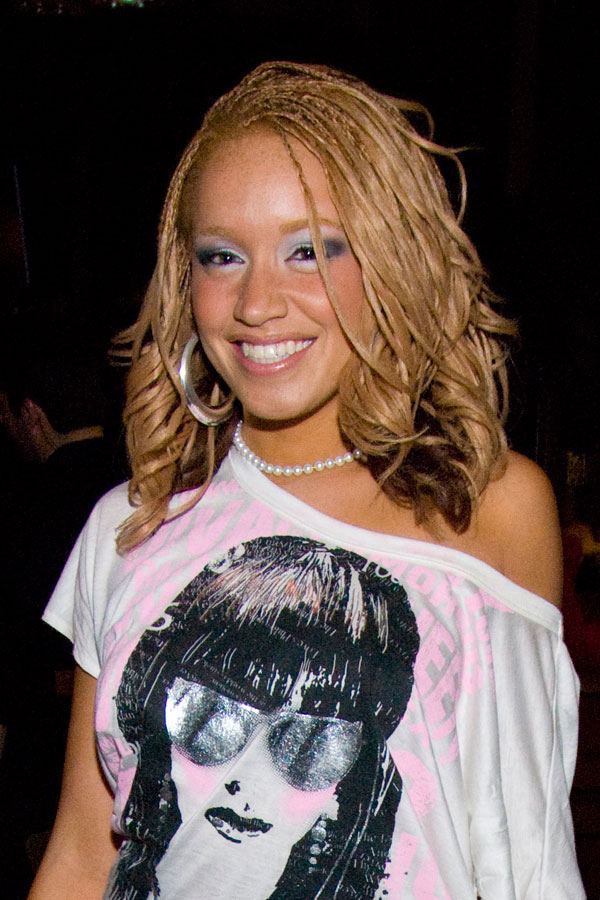
- Taylor on MTV Real World Tour at Chicago Vision Nightclub
- Born: May 30, 1987 (age 39)
- Occupations: Singer, songwriter
- Years active: 2005–present

Brianna Taylor (born May 30, 1987) is a reality show personality, singer and songwriter, having appeared on both the fifth season of American Idol and The Real World: Hollywood, the twentieth season of MTV's long-running reality television series, The Real World. In 2008, she released her debut, self-titled EP, Brianna Taylor, on Chamberlain Records; according to that label's website, she was later signed to Universal Music.

== Early life ==
Taylor is of African American, German, and Puerto Rican descent. Her mother, Yvonne, raised Brianna and her sister, Victoria, as a single mother. They lived first in the Mount Airy neighborhood of Philadelphia before moving to Warrington Township.

Taylor attended Central Bucks High School East in Buckingham Township, Bucks County, Pennsylvania, graduating in 2005.

== Career ==
Taylor never took singing lessons; her grandmother acted as her vocal coach. After gaining experience singing at weddings and shopping malls, she auditioned for the popular singing competition, American Idol during that show's fifth season and reached the Top 44 before eventually being eliminated.

Before auditioning for The Real World and eventually being cast in its 20th anniversary season, Taylor was an exotic dancer for two years at Double Visions in Horsham Township, Pennsylvania, near Philadelphia. While living in Philadelphia, Taylor maintained a volatile relationship with an ex-boyfriend, and at one point, a violent argument resulted in Taylor's arrest and eventual guilty plea to a reduced charge of harassment. The aftermath of the episode can be seen on her season of The Real World. In the third episode of that season, she reveals that she had battled an addiction to crystal meth and cocaine as recently as two months prior to being cast on the show.

During the show, Brianna develops a mutual attraction for fellow roommate Joey Kovar, but is later disturbed by how he behaves while intoxicated. She also returns to Philadelphia with roommate Will Gilbert to resolve her legal troubles during that season, and is picked up to record several songs of her own, as well as perform live with Alex Band, formerly of the band The Calling. In the show, she is also offered a song by Matthew Bair of the powerpop band Bandcamp.

Taylor's debut self-titled EP, Brianna Taylor, was co-produced by Tomas Costanza, of the band Diffuser, and Matthew Bair, who is now a guitarist with Eve 6. The first single, "Summertime," was released in 2008. As of July 22, 2008, Brianna's self-titled EP was the 16th most-purchased album on iTunes and sold over 60,000 copies.

Taylor returned to MTV in order to participate in the eighteenth season of the show's long-running The Real World/Road Rules Challenge, which premiered on September 30, 2009. She was in the challenger's team and was eliminated in the third episode.

On October 13, 2009, Taylor released her first full-length debut album, Fireworks at the Fairground via Chamberlain Records, featuring her new single Criminal.

== Television work ==
- American Idol (Fox; 2005) Herself
- The Real World: Hollywood (MTV; 2008) Herself
- Real World/Road Rules Challenge: The Ruins (MTV; 2009) Herself

== Discography ==
- Brianna Taylor (EP) (Chamberlain Records; 2008)
- Fireworks at the Fairground (Chamberlain Records; 2009)
