= Celebrity Rehab with Dr. Drew =

American television series

- Starring: Dr. Drew Pinsky
- Country of origin: United States
- Original language: English
- No. of seasons: 6
- No. of episodes: 50 (list of episodes)

Production
- Executive producers: Drew Pinsky; John Irwin; Howard Lapides; Damian Sullivan; Brad Kuhlman
- Producers: Jack Siefert (season 1); Duncan White (season 2); Lisa Digiovine; Danita Jones
- Cinematography: Jeff Rhoads (season 1); David Ortkiese (season 1); Stefanos Kafatos (season 2)
- Running time: 60 minutes 90 minutes (first episode) (with commercials)
- Production companies: Irwin Entertainment, Inc. VH1

Original release
- Network: VH1
- Release: January 10, 2008 – November 18, 2012

Related
- Celebrity Rehab Presents Sober House Sex Rehab with Dr. Drew

Celebrity Rehab with Dr. Drew, later called simply Rehab with Dr. Drew, is a reality television show that aired on the cable network VH1 in which many of the episodes chronicle a group of celebrities as they are treated for alcohol and drug addiction by Dr. Drew Pinsky and his staff at the Pasadena Recovery Center in Pasadena, California. The first five seasons of the series, on which Pinsky also serves as executive producer, cast celebrities struggling with addiction, with the first season premiering on January 10, 2008, and the fifth airing in 2011.

The sixth season, which filmed in early 2012, featured non-celebrities as treatment subjects, and the series name shortened to Rehab with Dr. Drew. Season 6 premiered on September 16, 2012. In May 2013, Pinsky announced that season six was the final season, explaining that he had grown weary of the criticism leveled at him after celebrities that he treated had relapsed into addiction and died.

== Recurring cast ==
The following are staff of the Pasadena Recovery Center (PRC), where the series is filmed. Casts for individual seasons are seen in sections for those seasons.

- Dr. Drew Pinsky – Pinsky is the star of the show, and the lead specialist who treats the patients. A board-certified internist and addiction medicine specialist, he rose to fame as the host of the nationally syndicated radio talk show, Loveline. In addition to Celebrity Rehab, he also appears in its spinoffs, Sex Rehab with Dr. Drew and Sober House.
- Shelly Sprague – The resident technician who runs the floor. A recovering addict herself, she has also appeared on Sex Rehab with Dr. Drew. She met Pinsky through Bob Forrest, a fellow recovering addict and colleague of Drew's with whom Sprague used to do drugs. She runs a center at Las Encinas Hospital in Pasadena, California. Pinsky observes that she becomes more personally involved with the patients than other technicians like Loesha do.
- Bob Forrest – Pinsky's head counselor, who appears during group sessions. A rock musician who fronted the bands Thelonious Monster and The Bicycle Thief and a recovering addict since 1996, Forrest is the chemical dependency program director at Las Encinas Hospital, where he was hired by Pinsky.
- Loesha Zeviar – A Resident Technician who first appears in the second episode of Season 2. Responding to observations that Loesha receives more abuse than Sprague, Pinsky describes her as more staid than Sprague. Pinsky has referred to her as one of the strongest staff members at the PRC.
- Dr. Charles Sophy – psychiatrist and director of the Los Angeles County Department of Children and Family Services. He is also the author of Side By Side The Revolutionary Mother-Daughter Program for Conflict-Free Communication, and is the lead psychiatrist of the Celebrity Rehab and Sober House production team. Although he only appears occasionally, he was present throughout the filming of the second season of Sober House.
- Sasha Kusina – A nurse at the Pasadena Recovery Center. Although seen as early as Season 2, it is in Season 5 that her full name is revealed and she is seen speaking with the other staff, in regards to her rapport with patient Bai Ling, whom Kusina convinces to take her prescribed psychiatric medication.
- Jennifer Gimenez – A model and actress and former addict who credits her recovery to Pinsky, Gimenez was the sober living house manager on the Celebrity Rehab spinoff Sober House, and began working as a rehab technician at the Pasadena Recovery Center in Season 5 of Rehab.
- Dr. John Sharp – Dr. Sharp is a board certified psychiatrist, best-selling author, and media expert. He is part of the faculty of both the Harvard Medical School and the David Geffen School of Medicine at UCLA, dividing his time between Boston and Los Angeles. He first appeared as the on Call Psychiatrist in Season 5, and serves in that role and as the Associate Medical Director beginning with season 6.
- Simone Bienne – A relationship therapist who first appears in season 6.

== Production ==
According to a December 2009 article in The New York Times, Drew Pinsky, who was alarmed by tabloid portrayals of addiction as an indulgence of the rich and famous, and a group of independent producers, approached VH1 with a proposal for a reality television series which would authentically depict addiction, as a sort of media intervention. According to executive producer John Irwin, casting for the first season was the most difficult, as the representatives of the celebrities who had been arrested or had publicized bouts with addiction refused to speak with him and the other producers. The process became easier after the first season aired. Actor Tom Sizemore, for example, who was cast for Season 3, had been sought after since Season 1. Producers have reportedly offered actress Lindsay Lohan six figures to appear on the show. Pinsky, who focuses on the treatment side of the production, is not usually involved with casting, though he reportedly visited Rachel Uchitel personally in order to convince her to join the fourth-season cast.

A multitude of cameras are employed, which film twenty-four hours a day, seven days a week, during the 21-day treatment cycle. Because some dramatic incidents occur early in the morning when the camera crews are not present, automated cameras are mounted all over the clinic to capture them. The exception to this are the bathrooms, which nonetheless are equipped with microphones to monitor unusual sounds, such as patients attempting to use drugs. In addition to receiving the free treatment (which would normally be worth approximately US$50,000–60,000), the patients receive a salary for their appearance on the series, which is prorated, and distributed once a week as an incentive to stay. Celebrity Rehab spun off two other shows. The first spinoff is Sober House, which depicts Rehab alumni living for 30 days at a sober living facility, as an interim step for recovering addicts between the completion of rehab and their eventual return to their old life. The second spinoff is Sex Rehab with Dr. Drew, in which Pinsky and his staff treat celebrities for sexual addiction.

In May 2013, Pinsky announced that season six was the final season, citing the criticism leveled at him following the relapse and death of cast members, saying, "I'm tired of taking all the heat. It's very stressful and very intense for me. To have people questioning my motives and taking aim at me because people get sick and die because they have a life-threatening disease, and I take the blame? Rodney King has a heart attack and I take blame for that? It's just ridiculous." Pinsky insisted that his practices depicted on the show were the same ones he, Bob Forrest and Shelly Sprague engaged in for decades, with the sole difference being the presence of cameras. Despite his decision not to continue the series, Pinsky stated a number of people achieved sobriety due to Celebrity Rehab who would not have attained it without the show, and cites as the biggest success story Sizemore, who struggled with Pinsky's program for 10 years before finally achieving sobriety after being on the show.

== Reception ==
While Pinsky and the series has won praise from both former addicts and other addiction specialists, many take issue with Pinsky's methods. Jeffrey Foote, a clinical psychologist and substance abuse expert, stated, "The velvet-glove confrontational stuff Pinsky does is what works for TV, but it's not what works for patients." The web site for Foote's Center for Motivation and Change uses a clip from Celebrity Rehab to demonstrate poor techniques. Foote added, "The dramatic confrontations seen on the show are actually more likely to drive less-severe substance abusers, who are by far the majority, away from seeking treatment." Critics also maintain that the patients' needs and the show's needs constitute a conflict of interest, with Dr. John J. Mariani, director of the Substance Treatment and Research Service at Columbia University stating, "The problem here is that Dr. Drew benefits from their participation, which must have some powerful effects on his way of relating to them. He also has a vested interest in the outcome of their treatment being interesting to viewers, which is also not in their best interest. Treatment with conflicts of interest isn't treatment."

Pinsky has responded to such criticism by saying his medical peers "don't understand television. You have to work within the confines of what executives will allow you to put on TV. Otherwise, we've not done anything, we've not really struggled to change the culture at all." Regarding the series airing on a network that broadcasts other reality shows featuring uncritical depictions of sexuality and alcohol as recurring themes, he said, "The people that need what we have are watching VH1. Not the people watching educational TV, the NPR crowd. You gotta give 'em what they want so you can give 'em what they need." Defending the practice of paying addicts to attend rehab, producer John Irwin said, "Whatever it takes to get them through the door so they can start treatment—that's the goal." Pinsky offered a similar response, saying, "My whole thing is bait and switch. Whatever motivates them to come in, that's fine. Then we can get them involved with the process."

Despite the involvement of former Alice in Chains bassist Mike Starr, as well as an appearance by Nancy McCallum, mother of the original Alice in Chains singer Layne Staley, who died of an overdose in 2002, the remaining original members of Alice in Chains, guitarist Jerry Cantrell and drummer Sean Kinney, have criticized the show, calling it "disgusting". Kinney said of the program, "It exploits people at their lowest point, when they're not in their right mind, and the sad part is, this is like entertainment for people when it's actually a life and death situation. I don't think it helps anybody and it makes entertainment out of people's possible death, and that's pathetic and it's stupid."

In March 2009, columnist Drew Grant called for an end to the series because of its "warped sense of priorities", opining that the practice of assembling celebrities with serious drug addictions with others that, according to Grant, either do not have addiction or whose addictions are self-diagnosed, like Rachel Uchitel and Gary Busey, for the purpose of creating entertainment, serves to encourage the "celebrity narcissism" which Pinsky himself has criticized. Not all substance-abuse specialists have been critical of the show. Dr. Mary Oxford, staff psychologist for the Menninger Clinic, praised it for removing the stigma surrounding addiction in the general public, for demystifying the process of treatment, and showing the lay public the skill of reflective listening.

As of June 2024, twelve celebrity alumni of the show have died. Seth Binzer; Jeff Conaway; Jason Davis; Rodney King; Tawny Kitaen; Joey Kovar; Joanie Laurer; Frankie Lons; Mindy McCready; Nikki McKibbin; Tom Sizemore; and Mike Starr.

== Episodes ==
=== Season 1 ===
Season One Cast
Cast member	Notability	Addiction
Seth "Shifty Shellshock" Binzer	Lead singer of rap rock band Crazy Town	Cocaine (powder and crack)
Daniel Baldwin	Actor (Departed the show in episode four)	Cocaine
Mary Carey	Porn actress and former candidate for California Governor	Alcohol
Jeff Conaway	Actor	Alcohol; cocaine; painkillers (Vicodin, OxyContin), Xanax, Zoloft, Ambien
Jaimee Foxworth	Former child actress	Marijuana
Joanie "Chyna" Laurer	Actress and former professional wrestler	Alcohol
Brigitte Nielsen	Actress and former model	Alcohol
Ricco Rodriguez	Mixed martial arts fighter and former UFC Heavyweight Champion	Cocaine; marijuana; benzodiazepines (Valium)
Jessica Sierra	Singer and former American Idol contestant	Cocaine; alcohol

Sierra, Binzer, and Carey agreed to enter a transitional sober living home in the season finale. All three, as well as Laurer and Foxworth, would eventually relapse; some re-entered treatment. VH1 aired a reunion special detailing the patients' lives since filming. Although Conaway was able to maintain sobriety from alcohol and cocaine, he continued to abuse analgesics for his back pain, and would re-enter treatment in the show's second season. Binzer also appeared in several episodes of the second season for his relapses, as well as the Sober House spin-off series. Laurer was hospitalized in December 2008 and was reportedly going back to rehab. She later was found dead in her house on April 20, 2016.

Nielsen and Rodriguez have reportedly maintained their sobriety. Pinsky has said on numerous occasions that Nielsen has quit drinking and also gave up smoking. Nielsen has also appeared on his radio shows to talk about her sobriety. In 2009, she appeared as a panel speaker to another group at the Pasadena Recovery Center, in which she anticipated the upcoming two-year mark of her sobriety that July, as seen in a third-season episode of the series, which aired in February 2010. Sierra has tested "clean and sober" for a year and a half following a court-ordered year of treatment at the Pasadena Recovery Center, She also appeared with Nielsen in the aforementioned third-season episode, marking her 18 months of sobriety.

The status of Baldwin's sobriety is unknown. As of May 2009, Foxworth is reportedly sober and gave birth to a son. Carey relapsed and returned to porn, starring in and directing a parody film called Celebrity Pornhab with Dr. Screw, a decision which Pinsky said saddened him. Regarding her sobriety, Pinsky commented in a January 2010 TV Guide story, "She puts together, like, six weeks at a time of sobriety, then drifts away. We're trying to get her to stay with it once and for all."

=== Season 2 ===
Season 2 of Celebrity Rehab premiered on October 23, 2008. Pinsky saw musician Steven Adler as this season's "problem child", describing his behavior as "suicidal", and related that Adler had to be put into a psychiatric hospital for two weeks prior to going into rehab. Jeff Conaway was also a grave concern, according to Pinsky. Actor and recovering cocaine addict Gary Busey entered the program, claiming to do so not as a patient, but as a mentor to assist others in their recoveries. This was stated in his contract, and confirmed by VH1's official press release about Season 2. Pinsky disputes this, however, stating, "I was confused too. But that's not my problem. My problem is that I've got a guy who needs help and I've got to figure out a way to get him into treatment. Gary [ends up having] a really inspirational experience. But it's a good 10 days before he comes around.

Season Two Cast
Cast member	Notability	Addiction
Steven Adler	Former Guns N' Roses drummer	Valium; alcohol; heroin; cocaine
Seth "Shifty Shellshock" Binzer	Lead singer of rap rock band Crazy Town, returning from Season 1 after Dr. Drew learned of his relapse	Stimulants (crack cocaine)
Gary Busey	Actor	Recovering cocaine addict, clean and sober for 13 years, though Pinsky questions his current use of medicinal marijuana for his asthma. He appears as a counselor to the other patients. (See above)
Jeff Conaway	Actor, returning from Season 1 following back surgeries which increased his painkiller addiction	Opiates (Oxycontin); cocaine
Rodney King	Became an American civil rights figure when videotaped in 1991 being beaten by L.A.P.D. officers, whose later acquittal sparked violent riots in L.A.	Alcohol
Tawny Kitaen	Actress and former model	Painkillers (Demerol and Vicodin) and cocaine
Nikki McKibbin	Singer and former American Idol contestant	Cocaine, alcohol, Adderall, painkillers (Vicodin); (McKibbin was formerly addicted to ecstasy as well.)
Amber Smith	Actress and model	Depressants, opiates (Valium, Xanax, Klonopin, Suboxone) and stimulants (Adderall, Dexedrine)
Sean Stewart	Son of singer Rod Stewart.	Alcohol; ecstasy; Vicodin; morphine; Fentanyl; cocaine; heroin

On October 1, 2008, rock band Alter Bridge, in conjunction with VH1, released a video for their single "Watch Over You" containing clips from the upcoming season of Celebrity Rehab.

Most of the celebrities (except for Kitaen, Busey and Stewart) agreed to make a transitional move into a sober living home which was filmed for Sober House– although Busey expressed interest in attending sober living as a speaker. Conaway was released early from the center during the final episode of Season 2 after kicking his girlfriend in the ribs during an argument. As soon as Conaway returned to his home, he continued abusing pain killers. During the course of Sober House, Adler, Smith and Binzer relapsed. Adler has made repeated appearances on Loveline talking about his success with sobriety and how his life is drastically different for the better. On September 26, 2009, Kitaen was arrested for drinking and driving. Amber Smith later appeared in the spinoff Sex Rehab. In 2009, Rodney King and Amber Smith appeared as panel speakers to a group of addicts at the Pasadena Recovery Center, marking 11 months of sobriety for King, and a year and a half of sobriety for Smith. Nikki McKibbin marked a year of sobriety on June 10, 2009. On November 1, 2020, McKibbin died of a brain aneurysm at age 42.

On May 11, 2011, Jeff Conaway was hospitalized for pneumonia, for which he was placed in an induced coma. He was later taken off life support, and died on May 27, 2011. He was the second Celebrity Rehab cast member to die in 2011, following the death of Mike Starr two months prior. Pinsky attributed Conaway's death to his addiction, stating, "What happens is, like with most opiate addicts, eventually they take a little too much...and they aspirate, so what's in their mouth gets into their lungs...That's what happened with Jeff." King was found dead in his swimming pool on June 17, 2012. He was 47 years old. His autopsy results indicated that he died of accidental drowning, although alcohol, cocaine, and marijuana were found in his blood and were contributing factors.

Tawny Kitaen died on May 7, 2021, from dilated cardiomyopathy at age 59.

=== Season 3 ===
On April 22, 2009, it was announced on the Futon Critic that Celebrity Rehab had been renewed for a third season and a new spinoff titled Sex Rehab with Dr. Drew was being put into production. Sex Rehab premiered on November 1, 2009. Season 3 of Celebrity Rehab premiered on January 7, 2010. Patient Heidi Fleiss was shown to be living in solitude in the wilderness of Nevada while caring for 25 parrots. Pinsky did brain scans of her which showed significant frontal lobe dysfunction, which Pinsky theorized was behind her inability to empathize with people, and her affinity for doing so with birds. Actor Tom Sizemore had been approached to appear in Season 1, but declined. He met with Pinsky about appearing in the second season, sitting in Pinsky's office for two hours, as Pinsky tells it, "sweating and completely high on drugs, talking a million miles an hour, acting like he was going to do it then deciding he didn't want to." He ultimately decided to appear in Season 3, but did not arrive in the season premiere with the others, forcing Pinsky's colleague Bob Forrest to seek him out. Pinsky adds in the season's fourth episode that he believes Sizemore's girlfriend is also a user, and their relationship is a threat to his sobriety. Pinsky points to Sizemore's story as emblematic of the difficulty of getting an addict to commit to rehab. Because of the tumultuous prior relationship between patients Sizemore and Fleiss, their consent to being cast together during the same season was obtained prior to filming.

Commenting on Dennis Rodman's detachment from the rehabilitation process, Pinsky said Rodman was "hyper-focused in some ways, and in others, completely blank", and observed that Rodman didn't comprehend what the other patients were experiencing, or how they perceived him. Pinsky concluded Rodman may have Asperger's syndrome, a diagnosis with which a colleague from UCLA Medical Center concurred. Mackenzie Phillips had accomplished several months of sobriety before checking into the Pasadena Recovery Center. Joey Kovar, who previously sought treatment for his addiction to cocaine and alcohol during his stint on 2008's The Real World: Hollywood, was spurred to return to rehab for his recurring addiction by the impending birth of his and his girlfriend Nikki's child.

Pinsky commented on Lisa D'Amato by saying, "I would classify her as an addict in denial. This is the only disease you have to convince people they have." Following her ejection from Sex Rehab with Dr. Drew, Kari Ann Peniche was allowed back to the Pasadena Recovery Center after she called Pinsky and asked for help. Pinsky, who explains in this season's fourth episode that treatment for drug addiction must take place before treatment for sex addiction, revealed that her aggressive behavior during Sex Rehab was derived from drugs she smuggled in a teddy bear, and which were difficult to detect during drug testing because of the medication Peniche took for attention deficit disorder. Irwin says her behavior had changed by her second appearance, though she did punch a camera man at one point.

Season Three Cast
Cast member	Notability	Addiction
Lisa D'Amato	Model and electronic rock musician	Alcohol; marijuana; amphetamines; cocaine; mushrooms
Heidi Fleiss	Former American madam	Methamphetamine; Valium; Xanax; Vicodin (Fleiss states that she is coming off a prescription for Suboxone.)
Joey Kovar	Cast member on The Real World: Hollywood	Alcohol; cocaine; ecstasy; methamphetamine; steroids
Mindy McCready	Country music singer	OxyContin; alcohol; (McCready states that she takes prescription Xanax for anxiety as needed, and that the painkillers found among her belongings during Intake were for her shoulder, which was dislocated a month prior.)
Kari Ann Peniche	Miss Teen USA 2002 and subject of a Playboy pictorial	Methamphetamine
Mackenzie Phillips	Actress	Heroin; cocaine (Formerly used marijuana.)
Dennis Rodman	Former basketball player	Alcohol
Tom Sizemore	Actor	Opiates; benzodiazepines; methamphetamine; marijuana; heroin; Klonopin (formerly used cocaine from 1991 to 1996)
Mike Starr	Former Alice in Chains bass player	Heroin; methadone; methamphetamine; cocaine; marijuana.

Peniche, Starr, Fleiss, Sizemore and Rodman all agreed to attend a sober living facility after treatment, which was chronicled on the second season of Sober House. Kovar indicated that he would get a sponsor, go to meetings, and go to sober living after his girlfriend moved into their new home. McCready, who cited the need to return to her son, indicated that she would go to Al-Anon. Since completing treatment, Pinsky says that D'Amato, who declined sober living, but agreed to go to meetings, "seems pretty good to me. My bet is she'll continue to flirt with using, but will have a deeper understanding now of her behavior." Phillips and McCready appeared with Pinsky in a segment on women and addiction on the March 17, 2010 episode of The View.

Mike Starr was arrested February 18, 2011, on two felony counts of possession of a controlled substance for 6 pills of the painkiller Opana and 6 pills of Xanax, an anti-anxiety drug. Starr was later found dead on March 8, 2011, in Salt Lake City, Utah. D'Amato would later return to television following her recovery to compete in the 17th cycle of America's Next Top Model, deemed America's Next Top Model: All-Stars. D'Amato won the competition.

On August 17, 2012, 29-year-old Joey Kovar was found dead at a friend's home near Chicago. Autopsy results were inconclusive, and the cause of death was pending a toxicological test as of August 18, though police stated that no foul play was indicated, and Kovar's brother David denied drugs were the cause, as he stated that Kovar was maintaining his sobriety. An autopsy revealed that Kovar died of "opiate intoxication".

On February 17, 2013, McCready died by suicide, at age 37. The cause of death was a single gunshot wound to the head. McCready is the third cast member from this season to die, and the fifth cast member from the series overall to die within a two-year period, though her death is the first in which a cast member's addiction was not contributing factor to their death. Pinsky released a statement saying that he was saddened by McCready's death, and that he had reached out to her recently upon hearing about the apparent suicide of her boyfriend and father of her younger child. Pinsky also stated, "Mental health issues can be life-threatening and need to be treated with the same intensity and resources as any other dangerous potentially life-threatening medical condition."

=== Season 4 ===
In May 2010, model and reality TV veteran Tila Tequila, who disclosed an addiction to prescription medication, was the first cast member announced for season four. However, on July 12, it was announced she withdrew from the cast. Filming on season four ended the week of August 1, 2010. It began airing on December 1, 2010. On August 31, RadarOnline reported Rachel Uchitel, who had been living at a sober living facility in Malibu, California, left the facility with Pinsky's permission in order to visit the World Trade Center site, where her fiancé, James Andrew O'Grady, was killed during the September 11, 2001 attacks, which Uchitel has explained was when her life began to unravel, culminating in a "massive breakdown" two years later. Uchitel spoke to other 9/11 families at the site and was moved by her encounter with them.

Season Four Cast
Cast member	Notability	Addiction
Jason Davis	Actor, socialite	Heroin; OxyContin; Xanax
Janice Dickinson	Model, fashion photographer, actress, author and agent.	Alcohol; cocaine (Dickinson says she formerly took Ativan and takes one prescription Ambien a night to sleep.)
Leif Garrett	Actor, singer, and TV commentator	Cocaine; heroin
Jeremy London	Actor, best known for his regular roles on Party of Five, 7th Heaven, and I'll Fly Away.	Marijuana; painkillers
Francine "Frankie" Lons	Star of the BET reality show Frankie & Neffe, and mother of singer Keyshia Cole.	Alcohol; crack cocaine
Eric Roberts	Actor, known for his Oscar-nominated performance in Runaway Train and TV shows such as Less than Perfect and Heroes.	Marijuana (Formerly used cocaine and a variety of psychotropic drugs such as Prozac.)
Rachel Uchitel	Nightclub manager, correspondent for Extra, and one of Tiger Woods's mistresses.	Alcohol; Opiates including Vicodin; benzodiazepines including Valium, Klonopin, and Xanax
Jason Wahler	Reality television personality known as a second-season cast member on Laguna Beach: The Real Orange County	Alcohol

In a December 2010 interview in TV Guide, Pinsky stated Dickinson was "doing so well", in stark contrast to her struggles documented during filming. During the cast reunion show, Jason Davis claimed he had relapsed twice but was currently sober. However, on January 27, 2011, he was arrested for drug possession and subsequently charged with felony possession and being under the influence of narcotics. Davis subsequently died in Los Angeles on February 16, 2020, at age 35.

=== Season 5 ===
On March 3, 2011, Amy Fisher, Jeremy Jackson, Bai Ling, Michael Lohan and Michaele Salahi were announced as fifth season participants. Subsequent cast members added to the season roster later that month include Season 2 participant Steven Adler, actress Sean Young, former Major League Baseball pitcher Dwight Gooden and Survivor second runner-up Jessica "Sugar" Kiper. Michaele Salahi was later removed from the show because she did not have any addiction. Her husband, Tareq Salahi confirmed this, stating she went to Pinsky to treat her multiple sclerosis, and the stress brought on by that condition. She was discharged after she refused to comply with their demands that her problems be depicted as something other than MS. Season 5 premiered on June 26, 2011, though a "Sneak Premiere" was made available on VH1's website as early as June 22.

Season Five Cast
Cast member	Notability	Addiction
Steven Adler	Former Guns N' Roses drummer, returning from season 2	Marijuana
Amy Fisher	"Long Island Lolita" who shot her then-lover Joey Buttafuoco's wife, Mary Jo, in the face.	Alcohol (She was stated in the season premiere to have had prior addiction to unspecified pills, but this was indicated to be an ongoing problem in a season finale bonus clip.)
Dwight Gooden	Former Major League Baseball pitcher.	Cocaine; alcohol; Ambien
Jeremy Jackson	Actor, best known for his role on Baywatch as Hobie Buchannon.	Steroids
Jessica Kiper	Actress and television personality, best known for appearing twice as a contestant on Survivor.	Alcohol; marijuana; cocaine (former user); opiates, particularly Vicodin; benzodiazepines including Valium and Xanax
Bai Ling	Actress (Red Corner, Dumplings)	Alcohol
Michael Lohan	Father of actress Lindsay Lohan.	Alcohol (formerly used cocaine, but quit six years prior)
Sean Young	Actress (Blade Runner, Dune)	Alcohol

=== Season 6 ===
For season six, which was filmed in early 2012, the show was renamed Rehab with Dr. Drew, as the addicts selected as cast members would be non-celebrities in their 20s and 30s whose struggles would be depicted over the course of eight episodes. VH1 Executive Vice President, Original Programming & Production Jeff Olde explained the move away from celebrities thus: "This season, the moment felt right to turn our focus from celebrities, to young adults who could benefit under Dr Drew and his team's expert professional treatment. In some ways, we felt that stripping away the celebrity layer could reach even more viewers and touch them in a different way." Season 6 premiered on September 16, 2012.

Season Six Cast
Cast member	Hometown	Addiction	Biographical details
Eric Adams	South Boston, Massachusetts	heroin	Eric, who is 24, began drinking when he was 15. Although he never drank heavily, he started doing drugs when he was 16, after his mother – also a recovering addict – moved to Ireland to be with the father of Eric's then-two-year-old brother, who had been deported. This caused a traumatic feeling of abandonment which Eric says "broke" him. His drug use began with "oxys", ecstasy and cocaine he would take while partying, and graduated to heroin when he was 19 or 20. He has been arrested about six times, and the day before he checked into rehab, he was arrested by Boston police for distribution of narcotics in a school zone. If convicted, he faces up to 20 years in prison.
Ashleigh Izzi	Los Angeles	alcohol	Ashleigh's drinking began when her grandmother gave her wine at age 2. She drinks a bottle of vodka a day. As a result of her drinking, she has kidney failure, peptic ulcers and seizures, for which she has been to the hospital ten times, where doctors told her she would die. She also has poor body image as a result of being told she was fat, and says her mother neglected her. Pinsky says her detox symptoms could lead to full delirium tremens, and could potentially be life-threatening. Ashleigh and her younger sister were both molested as children.
Erika Melahn	Hollywood, California	cocaine, alcohol	Erika was pressured to stay thin when she modeled as a child, which led to poor body image and anorexia nervosa. She indicates a parent figure abandoned her at 16, and she was forced to move out at age 17, right before she graduated high school. She began doing cocaine at around age 19, and moved to Hollywood at age 20 to become a model, but found the industry filled with older men who exploit young women by plying them with drugs in order to take advantage of them. Now 22, she parties a lot, and her boyfriend of 15 months, Stefanos, who is 22 years her senior, does drugs with her.
Michael Mariano	Roxbury, New Jersey	heroin	Michael, who comes from an upper-class family, says he was a straight-A student, and successful at sports as a child, winning a taekwondo championship at one point. He was 16 when he started taking marijuana, eventually graduating to ecstasy at 17, and prescription pills before turning to opiates like heroin at 18. He says he did up to 40 bags of heroin a day, but has reduced this amount, and hit rock bottom after landing in jail because of his addiction. He hopes to go back to school, where he was studying business.
Deanna Salamone	Rochester, New York	marijuana, ecstasy, OxyContin, heroin	Deanna, who is 25 years old, has a 3-year-old son named Dominic with whom she shares joint custody with her mother. Dominic's father is a drug dealer whose three-year prison sentence for weapons charges will end within days. She began taking pills when he went to prison, beginning with OxyContin, which led to heroin, 20 bags of which she takes daily. She has also sold drugs, and resorted to working as an escort for a brief time in order to afford her drugs. She suffered sexual molestation from the age of 7 to 13, and was raped twice, including one time in front of her then-1-year-old son, and another in which she was gang raped at gunpoint by six men when she was a dealer. Her mother has been unsympathetic to these incidents, characterizing them as the natural consequence of being an addict and drug dealer. Deanna also says she suffered psychological abuse as a child.
Jasmen "Cinnamon" Evans	Dallas, Texas	alcohol	Jasmen is a 25-year-old model and rap music artist, originally from Chicago, Illinois. She has been drinking since she was 15, and can drink up to 40 beers or a gallon of wine a night. She and her husband have a 4-year-old son named Jaden. She has been arrested for driving while intoxicated and has blackouts and a liver enlarged by alcohol liver disease, which Dr. Drew says could develop into an advanced form if she doesn't stop drinking. She suffers from guilt over a miscarriage when she was four months pregnant. During the season she attempts to repair her relationship with her father, Mario, a recovering alcohol and heroin addict and former gang member who was not present in her life because he was 16 when she was conceived.
Heather Swartz	Malibu, California	alcohol, crack, heroin, OxyContin, LSD, ketamine	Heather, 43, started drinking after she was raped at age 10. At age 15, she was selling cocaine, and had people working for her. She eventually learned how to forge signatures, which she used to sign herself out of school, after which she traveled around a lot, characterizing her life as "jet-setting to the tenth degree". She hit rock bottom shortly after she contacted the producers, and entered another rehab facility, and thus enters the Pasadena Recovery Center with a few days of sobriety. She says she can drink up to nine or ten bottles of wine a day, and sprinkles heroin on crack to "take the edginess away".
Andrew "Drewbee" Arthur	Tampa, Florida	Ambien, Xanax, marijuana, alcohol, oxycodone, Suboxone	Drewbee is a "special case" to Dr. Drew, as the letter his mother wrote to Dr. Drew stood out to him. He has done a number of different drugs since the age of 13, characterizing himself a "trash can" for lacking any one drug of choice. He says he had everything he needed as a child, and may have been "a bit spoiled". He began developing hyperactivity approximately in the third grade, for which he was put on Adderall until about the ninth grade. His joined his first band, Radio Reset, at 15, and was signed by a label at 18. He sang for the Jackson family following the death of Michael Jackson. However, his drug use ended his career by age 22. Though he is "best friends" with his musician father, Jeff, who taught him music, Drewbee's drug use puts him into constant conflict with his parents, particularly Jeff, whom he has abused and exploited for money and drugs. Now 25, Drewbee takes about eight Ambien a day, which he mixes with Roxycodone, which he injects. Jeff himself has been recovering from an addiction to pills for 17 years. In Episode 6, Bob Forrest remarks that the level of codependency between Drewbee and his father is such that it can actually kill Drewbee, a situation Forrest had never before encountered. In the same episode, Pinsky reveals that Drewbee sustained head injuries that further hampers his judgment.

== DVD releases ==
Celebrity Rehab has been released on DVD exclusively through Amazon.

Season	Release date	Discs
1	August 21, 2008	4
2	March 4, 2010	
3	March 29, 2010	

== Spin-offs ==
- Celebrity Rehab Presents Sober House
- Sex Rehab with Dr. Drew

== See also ==
- Alison Triessl, co-founder and chief executive officer of the Pasadena Recovery Center
