= Irwin Entertainment =

American television production company

Irwin Entertainment, Inc. is a television production company founded in 2004 by John Irwin. The company is based in Los Angeles, California, and produces entertainment programming that are either scripted, live, or reality television.

== Productions ==
=== VH1 ===
Irwin Entertainment produced a past VH1 reality series about addiction, seasons 1-7 of Celebrity Rehab with Dr. Drew starring Drew Pinsky, Celebrity Rehab with Dr. Drew Reunion Special (2008) and 2 seasons of Sober House (2009). Irwin Entertainment also produced Couples Therapy, the 6th season of which aired during the fall of 2015 on VH1.

Irwin Entertainment produced the documentary series, Make or Break: The Linda Perry Project, with singer, songwriter, and producer Linda Perry, and showcases her Hollywood studio and her process of re-launching her record label. The series also shows her mentoring a group of young artists. Make or Break: The Linda Perry Project aired during the summer of 2014. The series was nominated for the 2014 GLAAD Award for Outstanding Reality Program.

Irwin Entertainment also produced the series Family Therapy with Dr. Jenn. The series shows five celebrity families as they partake in three weeks of family therapy.

John Irwin and Irwin Entertainment also produced NBC's Must See TV: A Tribute to James Burrows, which premiered to over 5.5 million viewers on February 21, 2016. Cast members from programs such as Friends, Cheers, Frasier, Will & Grace, Taxi, The Big Bang Theory, Mike & Molly, and Two and a Half Men participated in the show.

=== NBC ===
For NBC, the company produced Blake Shelton's Not so Family Christmas, a scripted comedy variety special that aired on December 3, 2012. The variety special won the 2014 WGA Award in the "Comedy/Variety – Music, Awards, Tributes – Specials" category. For his second consecutive year (Dec. 2013, Dec. 2014) John Irwin produced NBC's New Year's Eve with Carson Daly.

The company also produced the first season of A Little Late with Lilly Singh, a late-night talk show.

=== Other productions ===
For Spike (TV network), Irwin Entertainment produced Coaching Bad with retired two-time Super Bowl Champion and Super Bowl MVP Ray Lewis, who participated as a mentor to youth coaches from around the United States. The eight-episode series premiered in January 2015 and followed Ray Lewis along with anger management specialist Dr. Christian Conte as they put nine coaches through an anger management program to change their way of coaching. The coaches, who came from a variety of different sports from all around the country, move into a coaching center in Los Angeles for retraining and reconditioning.

Irwin has produced comedy specials with Nikki Glaser, Kevin Hart, David Spade, Daniel Tosh, John Mulaney, Artie Lange, Neal Brennan, Chris D'Elia, Steve Rannazzisi, Anthony Jeselnik, Nick Swardson, Norm Macdonald, Hannibal Buress, Tracy Morgan, Patton Oswalt, Trevor Noah, Nate Bargatze, Demetri Martin, Chris Hardwick, Patrice O'Neil, and Todd Barry.

Irwin Entertainment has also produced All Jacked Up, a series on CMT hosted by actor C. Thomas Howell. All Jacked Up is about stunts, sports, events and people from around the country, with each episode airing for 30 minutes.

== John Irwin ==
John Irwin founded the company after producing several other television programs and specials. Irwin spent four years producing Late Night with Conan O'Brien, two years as a producer for MADtv, and five years as Vice President of Development and Production for Lorne Michaels's Broadway Video.

Irwin Entertainment was also involved in the production of CMT's Barely Famous with The Warren Brothers, and other HBO productions, including Down and Dirty with Jim Norton, Brave New Voices, several comedy specials including Jim Norton - Monster Rain, D.L Hughley – Unapologetic, Dave Attell – Captain Miserable and Bob Saget - That Ain't Right.
