= Sober Living by the Sea =

Sober Living by the Sea is a division of CRC Health Group that operates treatment centers for alcoholism, drug addiction, and eating disorders based in Newport Beach, California, USA.

== Overview ==
Sober Living by the Sea was a controversial in the local community for having been involved in a Newport Beach NIMBY issue in which local residents claim that area recovery homes are infringing on their quality of life.

Sober Living by the Sea reached an agreement with the city of Newport Beach in January 2009 that will allow the facility to continue operating after agreeing to many concessions including a reduction in the number of "beds" the facility will maintain in the neighborhood.

== See also ==
- Advocates for Opioid Recovery
