= Nicole Narain =

American model and actress (born 1974)

Playboy centerfold appearance
- January 2002
- Preceded by: Shanna Moakler
- Succeeded by: Anka Romensky

Personal details
- Born: July 28, 1974 (age 52) Chicago, Illinois, U.S.
- Height: 5 ft 4 in (1.63 m)

Nicole Narain (born July 28, 1974) is an American model, actress and Playboy Playmate.

== Career ==
She was chosen as Playboy's Playmate of the Month in January 2002 and has appeared in numerous Playboy videos.

She has appeared in multiple music videos like R.L.'s song "Got Me a Model", LL Cool J's "Luv You Better", Mario Winans's "I Don't Wanna Know" and Fabolous' "Baby". Narain also competed on the NBC show Fear Factor Playboy Playmates Edition, but was eliminated in the first stunt.

== Personal life ==
She was born to an Afro-Guyanese mother and father of Chindian heritage (mixed Indo-Guyanese and Chinese Guyanese). In 2005, Narain was sued by the Irish actor Colin Farrell regarding a sex tape involving Narain and Farrell. This suit prevented the sale, distribution, or display of the tape. Nevertheless, it still became available on a number of internet sites. The lawsuit was eventually settled amicably.

On November 4, 2009, Narain appeared on The Joy Behar Show to discuss her sex addiction. This appearance was in conjunction with her casting on the reality-based show Sex Rehab with Dr. Drew.

Nicole Narain	Anka Romensky	Tina Marie Jordan	Heather Carolin	Christi Shake	Michele Rogers
Lauren Anderson	Christina Santiago	Shallan Meiers	Teri Harrison	Serria Tawan	Lani Todd
