= Charles Sophy =

American psychiatrist

- Born: 1960 (age 65–66); Pottsville, Pennsylvania, U.S.
- Education: Saint Joseph’s University (BS); Philadelphia College of Osteopathic Medicine (DO)
- Occupation: Psychiatrist
- Known for: Dr. Phil talk show

Charles Joseph Sophy (born 1960) is an American psychiatrist. He is a former medical director for the County of Los Angeles Department of Children and Family Services. He is also a member of the Dr. Phil show's advisory board and is a frequent guest on the show and other TV shows and stations including CNN, Today, HLN, and Dr. Drew. He has many celebrity clients and has worked with Paris Hilton, Michael Jackson and Mel B.

== Early life and education ==
Charles Sophy Jr. was born in Scranton, Pennsylvania, to Lebanese-American Catholics Charles Sophy Sr. (1922–2010) and Renee Sophy. His father was a coal miner. As the family had no subsidized healthcare, Sophy realized early on the importance of adequate medical care. He attended high school at Nativity BVM High School in Pottsville, Pennsylvania. He obtained his Bachelor of Science in Biological Sciences at Saint Joseph’s University in Philadelphia, Pennsylvania, in 1982. He graduated from the Philadelphia College of Osteopathic Medicine in 1986 and completed his internship and family practice residency at the Metropolitan Hospital/Springfield Hospital in Springfield, Pennsylvania. He completed his adult psychiatry residency at Norristown State Hospital in Philadelphia, followed by a fellowship for child and adolescent psychiatry at Hahnemann University Hospital in Philadelphia.

== Career ==
Sophy published the book Side By Side The Revolutionary Mother-Daughter Program for Conflict-Free Communication in 2010. He is a child mental health expert on Videojug, where he has addressed ADD and ADHD as well as other child mental health issues.

Sophy has achieved some notoriety among tax practitioners for having brought a suit in the United States Tax Court. In Sophy v. Commissioner, he and his domestic partner Bruce H. Voss sued because the Internal Revenue Service had limited the amount of their deductible home mortgage interest expense. The case held that unmarried co-owners are limited to the same amount of deduction that a married couple would be, by establishing that the maximum allowable deduction is determined per residence, not per tax return. However, this decision was later reversed and remanded by the U.S. Court of Appeals for the Ninth Circuit, which determined that home acquisition and equity debt limits do, in fact, apply on a per-taxpayer basis. The Internal Revenue Service subsequently acquiesced to the Ninth Circuit's decision, meaning that this per-taxpayer interpretation now applies across the U.S.

Elliot Rodger named Sophy as his psychiatrist in a typed 138-page manifesto sent to KEYT-TV and other media outlets prior to the 2014 Isla Vista killings. Sophy was among about one dozen people who received a mailed copy of the manifesto from Rodger. Sophy prescribed risperidone to Rodger. He did not take the medication, writing that "After researching this medication, I found that it was the absolute wrong thing for me to take. I refused to take it, and I never saw Dr. Sophy again after that."

Sophy's participation in reality shows has been questioned, particularly when children in the care of his department have died.

In 2019, he was named in a lawsuit against Mel B of the Spice Girls by her former personal assistant, Gary Madatyan, for pressuring him to lie and prescribing medication to Brown under Madatyan's name.

In 2024, he filed a temporary restraining order against rapper Dr. Dre, whom he was marriage counseling from 2018 to 2021, alleging his ex-client subjected him to a "systematic and malicious campaign of harassment." Young filed that complaint, after allegedly discovering that Sophy "had attempted to poison my relationship with my son, including by urging him to disclose my financial records to the media as part of his attempts to pressure me into settling my divorce on unfair terms". The order was dissolved in 2024.
