= Sober living house =

People recovering from substance use disorders stay on interim basis

Sober living houses (SLHs), also called sober homes and sober living environments, are facilities that provide safe housing and supportive, structured living conditions for people exiting drug rehabilitation programs. SLHs serve as a transitional environment between such programs and mainstream society. Many SLHs also accept people who are in recovery from substance use disorders but have not recently completed a rehabilitation program.

== Description ==
Sober living houses (SLHs) are "alcohol- and drug-free living environments for individuals attempting to maintain abstinence from alcohol and drugs". They are typically structured around 12-step programs or other recovery methodologies. Residents are often required to take drug tests and demonstrate efforts toward long-term recovery. Most SLHs serve only one gender. SLHs catering solely to young people are known as Sober Colleges.

Some SLHs offer intensive outpatient services, including on-site medical care. These homes are often staffed in shifts by psychiatric nurses and licensed clinical social workers, who provide residents with 24-hour supervision and centralized recovery care.

SLHs may be certified or governed by Sober Living Coalitions or Networks. However, "because there is no formal monitoring of SLHs that are not affiliated with associations or coalitions, it is impossible to provide an exact number of SLHs."

Sober living is seen in greater detail in Sober House, a spin-off of Celebrity Rehab, which documents alumni of Celebrity Rehab as they enter such facilities. VH1, which airs both shows, describes sober living thus:

A sober living house is an interim step on the path to sobriety where people recovering from addiction can live in a supervised and sober environment with structure and rules, i.e. mandatory curfews, chores, and therapeutic meetings. This can, however, invite corruption when certain people who have never had a position of authority before decide to play God. In this show, celebrity addicts, most of whom have spent the better part of their lives in the throes of addiction, will learn how to essentially start their lives over from the ground up. In many cases, successfully maintaining sobriety requires patients to alter everything about their previous lives when they were actively addicted to alcohol and other drugs. This could include changing jobs, eliminating friends, and even abandoning loved ones who are deemed toxic to their sobriety.

In some areas, sober homes have been linked to fraudulent insurance scams. This has prompted the proposal of bills that would regulate advertising and require registration for new homes.

== Resident requirements ==
Each individual SLH will have different requirements for the residents, but many will have these typical requirements:

1. No drugs, alcohol, violence, or overnight guests
2. Active participation in recovery meetings
3. Random drug and alcohol tests
4. On-time guest fee payments
5. Involvement in either work, school, or an outpatient program
6. General acceptance by peer group at the SLH
7. Participating in house chores and attending house meetings
8. No formal treatment services but either mandated or strongly encouraged attendance at 12-step self-help groups such as Alcoholics Anonymous (AA)

== Results ==
SLHs have been shown to improve recovery outcomes when utilized in conjunction with 12-step programs. Residences providing a highly structured schedule of activities tend to dramatically improve the likelihood of long-term sobriety.

In some cases, sober living homes will contract with licensed drug rehabilitation centers and therapists as a means for providing an even greater level of care. These types of sober livings do tend to charge higher fees, however, they are often able to provide a very affordable alternative to what would otherwise constitute high-priced inpatient treatment.

== Notable sober living establishments ==
- Sober Living by the Sea, in Newport Beach, California
- Sober Living in Orange County

== See also ==
- Halfway house
- Oxford House
