= Bill Cosby 77 =

2014 Netflix produced comedy film directed by Robert Townsend

- Promotional film image from Netflix
- Directed by: Robert Townsend
- Written by: Bill Cosby
- Produced by: Bill Cosby
- Starring: Bill Cosby
- Distributed by: Netflix
- Running time: ~60 minutes
- Country: United States
- Language: English

Bill Cosby 77 is an unreleased stand-up comedy film featuring Bill Cosby, filmed before a live audience at the San Francisco Jazz Center in California. Cosby chose the venue in honor of his friend Enrico Banducci and his establishment, the hungry i. The comedian said his wife Camille Cosby helped with the editing process of the film.

Around sixty minutes in duration, the film features Cosby pontificating on matters of children, romance, and matrimony. The film received its name because it was taped on Cosby's 77th birthday on July 12, 2014.

Cosby chose Netflix to release the performance because it would be able to be seen by viewers without interruptions for advertisements. On August 14, 2014, Netflix announced that Bill Cosby 77 would be made available to its subscribers on November 28, 2014. Netflix intended for the program to be available from the day after Thanksgiving in the United States.

On November 18, 2014, Netflix announced that it would delay the film's release date. The announcement by Netflix came a matter of hours after Janice Dickinson and several women made sexual assault accusations against Cosby. One year later, Netflix officially canceled the film's release.

== Production ==
Bill Cosby turned 77 years old on July 12, 2014. The same day, Bill Cosby 77 was filmed live in California during his performance at the San Francisco Jazz Center.

In August 2014, in an interview with The Patriot Ledger, Cosby explained why he selected the San Francisco Jazz Center as the venue for the performance: "We taped at the SFJazz Center, because San Francisco was the city that put me on the map."

Cosby stated that he had driven to San Francisco from Philadelphia in 1962 and encountered Enrico Banducci at an establishment called the hungry i. Cosby commented: "The new special is a tribute to the hungry i, which was an amazing two hundred seat venue that you were lucky to play, to Banducci, and to San Francisco. I've always loved that city, because of the great weather and because the people are loose but always well mannered."

Cosby remarked that his wife Camille Cosby helped with editing of the film: "My wife is my editor. Trust is what it is called, but it is really fear. It all goes to that one fundamental truth about marriage: the wife is in charge." The film was directed by Robert Townsend.

== Contents ==
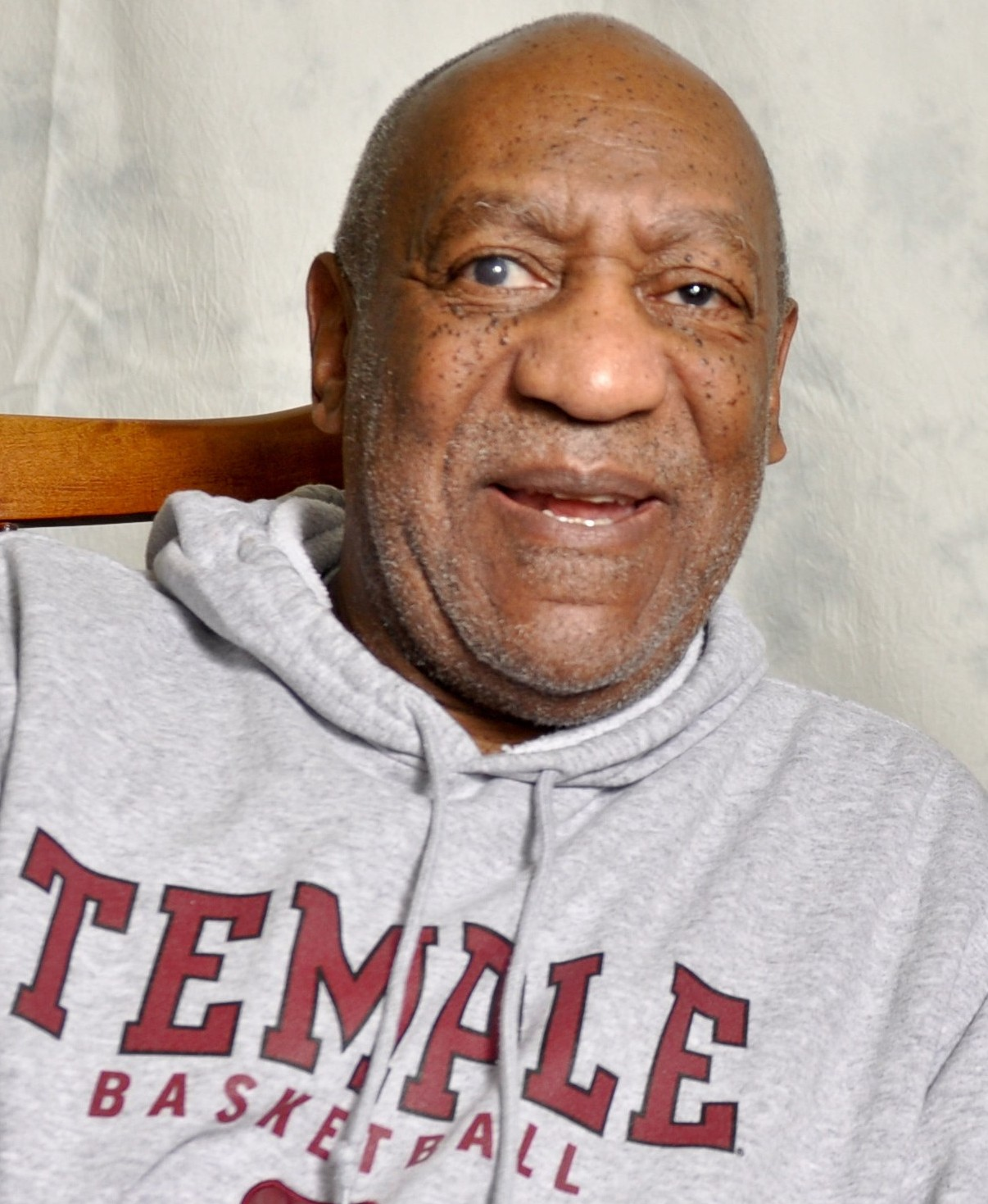
Bill Cosby in 2011

The running time of the film is about 60 minutes. The contents of the program include Cosby discussing children, the bonds of matrimony, and romantic associations between individuals.

== Marketing ==
Netflix marketed the film with the summary: "Bill Cosby invites you to share his birthday and 77 years of laughs, wisdom and hilarious insights about his childhood, first loves and parenthood." The film was named as a way to honor Bill Cosby in order to recognize his age, and the fact that it was taped on his birthday.

== Release ==
=== Date set ===
United Press International reported that Cosby chose Netflix to release the film, because he was enticed by the prospect of his viewers being able to watch the film without interruption for advertisements, and hoped this would provide an enhanced rhythm to the show. On August 14, 2014, Netflix announced that Bill Cosby 77 would be made available to its subscribers on November 28.

Netflix intended for the program to be made available from the day after Thanksgiving in the United States. After its announcement, Cosby posted to Twitter: "I thank @Netflix for this opportunity to show my talent all around the internet."

=== Cancelation ===
Netflix made public its decision on November 18 to delay release of the film. The announcement by Netflix came within hours after Janice Dickinson publicly added her name to a list women who alleged that Cosby had sexually assaulted and raped them. Dickinson said the incident occurred in 1982 in Lake Tahoe.

The Washington Post reported that the assertions by multiple women stating Cosby sexually assaulted them contributed to decisions by both Netflix and NBC to cease production or delay projects with Cosby. Dickinson asserted both Cosby and his lawyers had pressured her to remove mention of the incident from her book of 2002, No Lifeguard on Duty; his attorney Martin Singer disputed this account.

CNN reported that as of November 20, 2014, Bill Cosby 77 was listed with status of "coming soon". Netflix released a statement to the press which said: "At this time we are postponing the launch of the new stand up comedy special 'Bill Cosby 77.'" CNN attempted to get an additional explanation from Netflix but reported on November 20, 2014 that a representative for Netflix refused to provide additional information as to why the film was postponed from release.

Media reported that Cosby was in agreement with the decision by Netflix to delay release of the film.

In January 2015, Netflix chief content officer Ted Sarandos explained the company's rationale behind not airing the special in November 2014: "It just felt like the wrong time to have a comedy special from Bill Cosby. It was just an inappropriate time to have a standup comedy from Bill at that time, in the middle of the holidays." Sarandos described the events which led to the decision to postpone the special as "tragic". In July 2015, Sarandos stated Netflix had officially canceled the release of the film and would not air or release it any time in the near future.

When questioned at the Television Critics Association summer press tour, Sarandos responded: "I don't think it's appropriate to release that."

== See also ==
- Bill Cosby: Himself
- List of original programs distributed by Netflix
