= Hating America =

Hating America may refer to:

- Anti-Americanism, the hate, dislike of, or, opposition to, the governmental policies of the United States of America
- Hating America: A History, a 2004 book by Barry Rubin
- Hating America: The New World Sport, a 2004 book by John Gibson
