= Whores of the Court =

1997 book by Margaret A. Hagen

- Author: Margaret A. Hagen
- Language: English
- Publisher: ReganBooks
- Publication date: 1997
- ISBN: 978-0-06-039197-3

Whores of the Court: The Fraud of Psychiatric Testimony and the Rape of American Justice is a book by Boston University psychologist Margaret A. Hagen.
