= ReganBooks =

Closed publishing imprint of HarperCollins

ReganBooks was an American bestselling imprint or division of the HarperCollins book publishing house (parent company is News Corporation), headed by editor and publisher Judith Regan, started in 1994 and ended in late 2006. During its existence, Regan was called, by LA Weekly, "the world's most successful publisher". The division reportedly earned $120 million a year. ReganBooks focused on celebrity authors and controversial topics, sometimes from recent tabloids.

== History and publications ==
Prominent ReganBooks titles include Jenna Jameson's How to Make Love Like a Porn Star, biographies by General Tommy Franks, professional wrestler Mick Foley, and radio talk show host Howard Stern, three different books on the Scott Peterson case, and those by political commentator Sean Hannity. Though ultimately owned by politically active Rupert Murdoch, ReganBooks disavowed any political agenda, publishing, for example, books both supportive of and critical of George W. Bush.

In August 2004, ReganBooks had three books on The New York Times Best Seller list, including the top two non-fiction positions, and the highest profit ratio at HarperCollins.

In 2005, ReganBooks announced plans to move from Manhattan to Los Angeles, making it one of the first major book publishers to move from the east to the west coast.

== Controversy and closure ==
In November 2006, ReganBooks announced plans to publish O. J. Simpson's book If I Did It; publication was later cancelled by News Corporation chairman and CEO Rupert Murdoch. After the public fallout Newsweek reported, "Regan's meddlesome-free days are almost certainly over" and Murdoch will be "clamping" down on control.

On December 15, 2006, Regan was fired from HarperCollins, over antisemitic comments. The staff at ReganBooks were reassigned within the HarperCollins General Book Group. The New York Times reported that ReganBooks' offices were closed and "a stunned Ms. Regan was confronted by security guards who arrived with boxes and ordered her to leave." Regan sued News Corporation for $100 million for defamation over the antisemitism charge, asserting that it was "completely fabricated"; in January 2008 News Corporation settled the lawsuit and publicly stated, "After carefully considering the matter, we accept Ms. Regan's position that she did not say anything that was anti-Semitic in nature, and further believe that Ms. Regan is not anti-Semitic."

== Books published ==
- Bodansky, Yossef. The Secret History of the Iraq War. (ReganBooks, 2005) ISBN 0-06-073680-1
- Boortz, Neal; Linder, John. The FairTax Book. (ReganBooks, 2005) ISBN 978-0-06-087541-1
- Bork, Robert H. Slouching Towards Gomorrah: Modern Liberalism and American Decline. (ReganBooks, 1996) ISBN 0-06-039163-4.
- Canseco, Jose. Juiced: Wild Times, Rampant 'Roids, Smash Hits, and How Baseball Got Big. (ReganBooks, 2005) ISBN 0-06-074640-8
- Dickinson, Janice. No Lifeguard on Duty: The Accidental Life of the World's First Supermodel. (ReganBooks, 2002) ISBN 0-06-000946-2
- Dux, Frank. The Secret Man: An American Warrior's Uncensored Story. (ReganBooks, 1996) ISBN 0-06-039152-9
- Foley, Mick. Foley Is Good: And the Real World Is Faker than Wrestling. (ReganBooks, 2002) ISBN 0-06-103241-7
- Gibson, John. Hating America: The New World Sport. (ReganBooks, 2005) ISBN 0-06-076051-6
- Hannity, Sean. Deliver Us From Evil: Defeating Terrorism, Despotism, and Liberalism (ReganBooks, 2004) ISBN 0-06-058251-0
- Hannity, Sean. Let Freedom Ring: Winning the War of Liberty over Liberalism (ReganBooks, 2002) ISBN 0-06-051455-8
- Feldschuh, Michael. The September 11 Photo Project. (ReganBooks, 2002) ISBN 0-06-050866-3
- Jameson, Jenna. How to Make Love Like a Porn Star: A Cautionary Tale. (ReganBooks, 2004) ISBN 0-06-053909-7
- Maguire, Gregory. Wicked: The Life and Times of the Wicked Witch of the West. (ReganBooks, 1995) ISBN 0-06-039144-8
- Payne, Patricia. Sex Tips from a Dominatrix. (ReganBooks, 1999) ISBN 0-06-039287-8
- Pilla, Daniel J. "The IRS Problem Solver" (ReganBooks, 2004) ISBN 0-06-053345-5
- Simpson, O. J. If I Did It. (Cancelled in November 2006)
- Thompson, Paul. The Terror Timeline. (ReganBooks, 2004) ISBN 0-06-078338-9
- Taormino, Tristan. Down and Dirty Sex Secrets. (ReganBooks, 2003) ISBN 0-06-098892-4
