= John Gibson (political commentator) =

American radio talk show host

- Born: John David Gibson; July 25, 1946 (age 80); Los Angeles, California, U.S.
- Occupation: Talk show host
- Years active: 1969–present
- Spouse: Susan Pszonosky (2000–present)
- Children: 1

John David Gibson (born July 25, 1946) is an American radio talk show host. As of September 2008, he hosts the syndicated radio program The John Gibson Show. He formerly co-hosted the weekday edition of The Big Story on Fox News.

== Career ==
Gibson earned a Bacherlor of Arts degree from UCLA's School of Theater, Film and Television. He began his reporting career with The Hollywood Reporter (1969–1972) and worked for Atlantic Records (1972–1974). Gibson worked for KFWB-AM (1974–1975) and KEYT-TV (1975–1977). At KCRA, he was a feature reporter on the Weeknight magazine show (1977–1979) and San Francisco bureau chief (1979–1989).

Beginning in 1992, Gibson worked as an NBC News correspondent in Burbank, California. In 1994, he became the first West Coast correspondent for the NBC News Channel. He covered the 1995 O. J. Simpson trial for the murders of Nicole Brown Simpson and Ronald Goldman for NBC News Channel and Rivera Live on CNBC. In 1996, he was named as daytime anchor on MSNBC, where he covered the Bill Clinton-Monica Lewinsky scandal in 1998.

Gibson joined the Fox News Channel in September 2000 as the host of the rolling news program Fox News Live with John Gibson, which, in 2001, was turned into The Big Story. In 2007, Heather Nauert joined The Big Story as his co-host. He also wrote the New York Times bestselling books, Hating America: The New World Sport and The War on Christmas (referencing the controversies of the same name).

On March 12, 2008, Fox News Channel announced that The Big Story was being replaced with America's Election Headquarters, a program more directly geared toward following the 2008 U.S. presidential election. The Big Story was not renewed after the election and was replaced with The Glenn Beck Program in January 2009. Following this cancellation, Gibson was a regular guest-panelist on Fox's late-night satire show Red Eye w/ Greg Gutfeld, and was often the butt of jokes on episodes in which he was absent.

As of September 2008, he began hosting the syndicated radio program The John Gibson Show. Initially the show was broadcast on Fox News Radio, but since 2017 it has been syndicated by the Genesis Communications Network.

== Gibson vs. the BBC ==
In 2004 Gibson said that the British Broadcasting Corporation was anti-American, accusing the BBC of having "a frothing-at-the-mouth anti-Americanism that was obsessive, irrational and dishonest". He also claimed that reporter Andrew Gilligan, who was covering the 2003 Iraq War for BBC Radio 4 in Baghdad, had, "insisted on air that the Iraqi Army was heroically repulsing an incompetent American military".

Gibson's criticisms were rejected by UK regulator Ofcom when it investigated viewer complaints about his item. Ofcom also found that Gibson's broadcast was in violation of several UK television regulations, concluding that Gibson's commentary did not display a "respect for truth", failed to offer the BBC a chance to respond to the allegations, and was based on "false evidence."

== Public comments ==
Gibson as a commentator often attracts criticism.

Following the 2007 SuccessTech Academy shooting, on his radio show, Gibson commented, "I knew the shooter was white. I knew he would have shot himself. Hip-hoppers don't do that. They shoot and move on to shoot again. And I could tell right away because he killed himself. Hip hoppers shooters don't do that. They shoot and move on."

In a 2008 edition of his radio show, Gibson commented on actor Heath Ledger's death the day before. He opened the segment with funeral music and played a clip of Jake Gyllenhaal's famous line "I wish I knew how to quit you" from Ledger's film Brokeback Mountain; and then said "Well, I guess he found out how to quit you." Among other remarks, Gibson called Ledger a "weirdo" with "a serious drug problem". The next day, he addressed outcry over his remarks by saying that they were in the context of jokes he had been making for months about Brokeback Mountain, and that "There's no point in passing up a good joke." Gibson later apologized on his television and radio shows.

In February 2009, Attorney General Eric Holder had given a speech to Justice Department employees as a part of the observance of Black History Month during which he described the United States as being a "nation of cowards" in its reluctance to discuss racial relations. Gibson criticized Holder's remarks as inappropriate. John Sanders, who at the time was technology reporter for WBAL-TV in Baltimore, then intentionally edited Gibson's remarks which had followed news reports of a monkey who had escaped from a Seattle zoo, making it appear that Gibson had compared Holder to a monkey "with a bright blue scrotum" on Fox. Sanders then posted the altered video on YouTube without a disclaimer that it was a joke. Because of this, the video was widely publicized on news websites, including The Huffington Post, as if it were authentic. Sanders was fired over the video, and Gibson said that the spread of the fake video has had a "personal" impact upon him.

== Books ==
- Gibson, John. How the Left Swiftboated America: The Liberal Media Conspiracy to Make You Think George Bush Was the Worst President in History. (HarperCollins, 2009). ISBN 978-0-06-179289-2.
- Gibson, John. The War on Christmas: How the Liberal Plot to Ban the Sacred Christian Holiday Is Worse Than You Thought. (Sentinel HC, 2005). ISBN 1-59523-016-5.
- Gibson, John. Hating America: The New World Sport. (ReganBooks, 2004) ISBN 0-06-058010-0.
