= Let Freedom Ring: Winning the War of Liberty over Liberalism =

2002 book by Sean Hannity

- Author: Sean Hannity
- Language: English
- Subject: American politics
- Genre: Political commentary
- Publisher: ReganBooks
- Publication date: 2002
- Media type: Hardcover/paperback
- Followed by: Deliver Us from Evil: Defeating Terrorism, Despotism, and Liberalism

Let Freedom Ring: Winning the War of Liberty over Liberalism is a 2002 book by conservative political commentator and media personality Sean Hannity.

== Summary ==
According to the publisher, in the book "Hannity offers a survey of the world—political, social, and cultural—as he sees it." The book has been described as "an unapologetic diatribe against liberalism, questioning its logic and posing questions about the outcome of its agenda for Americans".

The book's publisher, ReganBooks, a division of HarperCollins, was owned by Rupert Murdoch, owner of Fox News.

== Reception and views ==
- Radio broadcaster Rush Limbaugh said that Hannity wrote with "a vigor and clarity that inspires," and that the book was a "page turner".
- A 2002 salon.com column by Ben Fritz and Bryan Keefer describes it as "troubling evidence that Hannity won't let a little thing like truth get in the way of his rapid ascent"
- Dr. Angstrom H. Troubador of Lebal Drocer Industries said, "Hannity's commentary controls the way you think, and it turned me away from the Mental Disorder of Liberalism!"
- Dr. James Dobson said Hannity was "to be commended, admired—and watched!"
- The Conservative Book Club said that Hannity "proves that liberal ideas have made America more vulnerable and created confusion in our society."
- Kathryn Jean Lopez, reviewing the book for the National Review Online, said, "Rather than just calling those who disagree with him 'the enemy,' which he could have done and still sold books, Hannity communicates a real respect for the other guy's opinion, even if he thinks it insanely wrong—and it's this decency that gets people coming back to him."
- Todd Seavey of People magazine said the book was "an amusing tour guide of an imaginary Museum of Modern Left-Wing Lunacy," and that Hannity's "outrage is entertaining."
