= Conservative Victory =

2010 book by Sean Hannity

Conservative Victory: Defeating Obama’s Radical Agenda
- Author: Sean Hannity
- Language: English
- Subject: American politics
- Genre: Political commentary
- Publisher: HarperCollins
- Publication date: March 30, 2010
- Publication place: United States
- Pages: 248
- ISBN: 978-0-06-200305-8
- Preceded by: Deliver Us from Evil: Defeating Terrorism, Despotism, and Liberalism

Conservative Victory: Defeating Obama's Radical Agenda is a 2010 book by conservative political commentator and media personality Sean Hannity.

Conservative Victory was published by HarperCollins with an initial printing of 1.5 million books, which were released on March 30, 2010. It was Hannity's first publication in six years. It was principally edited by David Limbaugh. It became Hannity's third New York Times Bestseller, reaching number one on the paperback nonfiction list.
