= Live Free Or Die: America (and the World) on the Brink =

Book by Sean Hannity

- Author: Sean Hannity
- Language: English
- Genres: Political Freedom
- Publisher: Threshold Editions
- Publication date: August 4, 2020
- Publication place: America
- Media type: Print
- Pages: 352
- ISBN: 1982149973

Live Free Or Die: America (and the World) on the Brink is a book by Sean Hannity.

Live Free or Die discuses the nature of American freedom, democracy, individualism, and how they reflect to politics of the country and the world.
