= Deliver Us from Evil: Defeating Terrorism, Despotism, and Liberalism =

2004 book by Sean Hannity

- The cover of Deliver Us from Evil, a 2004 book by Sean Hannity
- Author: Sean Hannity
- Language: English
- Subject: American politics
- Genre: Political commentary
- Publisher: ReganBooks
- Publication date: 2004
- Media type: Hardcover/paperback
- Preceded by: Let Freedom Ring: Winning the War of Liberty over Liberalism
- Followed by: Conservative Victory: Defeating Obama’s Radical Agenda

Deliver Us from Evil: Defeating Terrorism, Despotism, and Liberalism is a 2004 best-selling book by conservative political commentator and media personality Sean Hannity. The book's publisher, ReganBooks, was owned by Rupert Murdoch, owner of Fox News. ReganBooks focused on celebrity authors and controversial topics, sometimes from recent tabloids. It is now defunct but experienced significant financial success while it existed.

Hannity has said he dictated much of his two books into a tape recorder while driving in to do his radio show.

== Summary ==
In the book, Hannity explains a direct progression from Adolf Hitler and Joseph Stalin through Saddam Hussein and Osama bin Laden. He praises world leaders such as George W. Bush and Ronald Reagan for moral clarity and vision, and contrasts these with viewpoints and actions of current politicians he sees as liberal.

== Reception and views ==
Rebecca Hagelin, vice president of The Heritage Foundation said, "Deliver Us From Evil contains brilliant explanations and defenses of conservative principles Americans have come to count on Hannity to deliver. But in a most compelling fashion, Sean also has the guts to call evil for what it is, and the boldness to illuminate truth as the only answer." The conservative magazine National Review summarized it as providing a "compelling conservative perspective"

Business Week stated that "Hannity's biases and rhetorical style are revealed from the outset", and that the book is "full of name-calling trumped up as intellectual debate, one-sided history lessons designed to deceive the ill-informed, and good old-fashioned war-mongering", and that it "isn't a good sign that millions of Americans are lapping up copies of this and similarly simple-minded and intemperate books."

The St. Louis Post-Dispatch complimented the book for its style of prose that "steers clear of the dully academic", and then continued, "But that's the kindest thing to be said of Deliver Us From Evil. It reads like a long, long transcript of his television and radio shows, with their Manichaean monologues".

Publishers Weekly said of the book, "Many readers... will find Hannity's 'irrefutable' evidence to be anything but", and that "his selective use of history and circular logic raise far more questions than it settles."

The magazine of the World Future Society summarized the book, "The polarization typified in this one-eyed rant is a further complication in seeking security in today's world".

A self-described liberal, Steve Young of American Politics Journal reviewed the book during an edition of the Hannity & Colmes show before a live audience. During the show, Young pinpointed specific sections where Hannity misconstrued sources to say something they did not. Young says that Hannity's response was to start talking over him, while urging the crowd to chime in, and to deny the plain facts Young showed him from on-hand copies of the material Hannity had misconstrued.

Discussing the religiously wedded political rhetoric in the book, Jason Carter, grandson of President Jimmy Carter, arguing in the Georgia Law Review journal, stated that the book is "an example of not only 'us against them' piety but also the inappropriate use of religious language." He stated that "Hannity compares American liberals to terrorists and despots and categorically calls them 'evil'." Carter states that Hannity "takes a line from the Lord's Prayer, praying for God to deliver us from evil, and uses it to make a political statement as though his argument, his party, or his President would do the delivering."
