= No Lifeguard on Duty =

Book by Janice Dickinson

- First edition cover
- Author: Janice Dickinson
- Original title: No Lifeguard on Duty: The Accidental Life of the World's First Supermodel
- Language: English
- Subject: Supermodel
- Genre: Autobiography
- Published: 2002 (ReganBooks)
- Publication place: United States
- Media type: Print (Hardcover)
- Pages: 320
- ISBN: 978-0060009465
- OCLC: 50494100
- Dewey Decimal: 746.9/2/092 B
- LC Class: 2002069701
- Followed by: Everything About Me Is Fake – And I'm Perfect (2004)

No Lifeguard on Duty: The Accidental Life of the World's First Supermodel is an autobiography by fashion model, photographer, author and talent agent Janice Dickinson. It was published in hardcover format in 2002 by ReganBooks, an imprint of HarperCollins. The author's friend make-up artist Way Bandy advised her to begin putting her past experiences down on paper as a form of therapy from prior trauma in her life. After gaining sobriety, she started compiling her notes into book format. She contacted book publisher Judith Regan who agreed to help her publish her book after hearing her tale on the phone, without first seeing a writing sample. In November 2014, Dickinson asserted in an interview with Entertainment Tonight that pressure from Bill Cosby and his lawyers resulted in the removal of an account of sexual assault and rape by Cosby when she visited him at a hotel in Lake Tahoe, California in 1982. After Cosby's attorney disputed this account, she reappeared on the program to proclaim she was telling the truth and explained she was speaking out publicly because of a need to be heard and to represent other women who stated they experienced a similar trauma.

The book recounts Dickinson's early life where she states she experienced child abuse from her father, and moves forward describing her experiences throughout her career as a model. Dickinson explains her struggle with substance dependence upon drugs and alcohol during her career. The author discusses her time as a representative for companies including Virginia Slims, Max Factor, and Hush Puppies; and her success appearing on the covers of magazines including: Vogue, Elle, Harper's Bazaar, and Cosmo. While performing work as a model she takes the time to gain knowledge about the craft of photography and fashion. Dickinson describes how she originated the term "supermodel". No Lifeguard on Duty cautions about the tendency towards insecurity in celebrity culture.

No Lifeguard on Duty received a favorable reception from multiple publications. Film rights to the book were purchased by Warner Bros. in 2004. Women's Wear Daily praised the author's comedic style in the work. Knight Ridder Newspapers wrote positively of the author's courage at describing difficult experiences from her past. The New York Observer found the writing style of the book to have a good flow throughout. Publishers Weekly wrote: "Dickinson comes across as a triumphant survivor."

Dickinson's book had a positive impact on her career. Because of reading the book, Tyra Banks decided to bring Dickinson on board as a judge on her new program America's Next Top Model in 2003. Dickinson served as a judge on the program for a total of four seasons before being replaced by Twiggy. Oxygen Network subsequently hired her for its new program centered on the author's efforts to start her own company; the program launched in 2006 titled: The Janice Dickinson Modeling Agency.

== Writing process ==
Janice Dickinson's friend make-up artist Way Bandy recommended she use the writing process to help heal from her past experiences. She began to do so as part of her addiction recovery during a twelve-step program. She put her notes down on legal pads and they became numerous over time. By the time Dickinson began to compile her writing into book format she had become established in her career and resided in Los Angeles, California with her two children. She started formally putting her notes together into a book after successfully gaining sobriety.

She got in touch with book publisher Judith Regan who agreed to help her publish the book after a brief phone call, without first receiving a draft of the work. In an interview with Los Angeles Magazine, Dickinson recalled the process of pitching her book to Regan: "I got a book deal without even turning in one shred of a writing sample. I was having an invincible moment. I told her how difficult it was for me growing up with an abusive father, how when I went to New York to become a model I was rejected for a year for being 'too ethnic.' Judith said, 'Okay, I'm in.'"

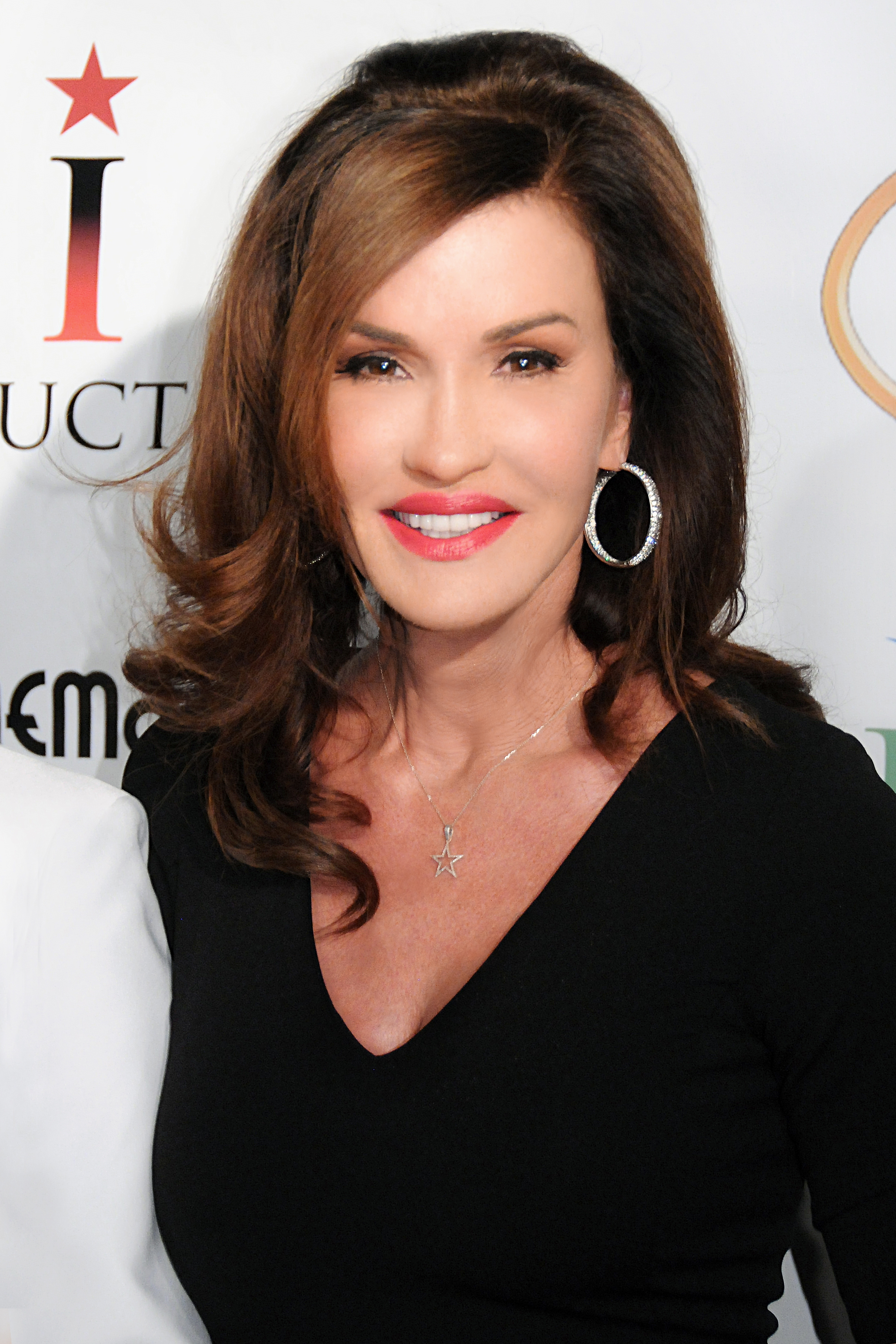
Janice Dickinson in 2014

The author explained to Los Angeles Magazine her reasoning for including in the book a graphic phrase used by Jack Nicholson after his lovemaking session with her: "The reason that line made the book is because he told me not to say anything. And I will never, ever respond to anybody—man, woman, vegetable, or mineral—who tells me to keep my mouth shut. Alter what I've been through, I don't think so, pal."

Dickinson explained in an interview that she authored the work to communicate to others to publicly reveal their past negative experiences as a way to heal from trauma. She stated: "I wrote this book to urge people not to keep secrets. I still suffer. The memories are still vivid. I made a lot of mistakes. I was shaped by my mistakes. But the past is done. The future's up to me."

== Contents summary ==
Janice Dickinson describes her early life where she suffered child abuse and physical abuse at the hands of her father. She writes that her three sisters and mother also experienced abuse from her father. She recounts her ups and downs during her career while finding success in the fashion industry. She emphasizes how bravery is important to success, and explains how she remained firm on her request for US$20,000 for a modeling position when the market figure at the time was only $5,000. Throughout the process she experiences emotional pain from relationships that lack depth, and learns for herself about the harms of substance dependence. Incidents related to her drug addiction problems include ingesting heroin from Gia Carangi prior to a photography session in Italy, and an experience in a state of alcohol intoxication falling off a fashion runway for Valentino Garavani and landing upon Sophia Loren.

The author discusses her time as a representative for companies including Virginia Slims, Max Factor, and Hush Puppies. She writes of her success appearing on the covers of magazines including: Vogue, Elle, Harper's Bazaar, and Cosmo. Professional photographers including Francesco Scavullo, Norman Parkinson, Irving Penn, Richard Avedon, Peter Beard, and Michael Reinhardt work with her in photoshoots. While performing work as a model she takes the time to gain knowledge about the craft of photography and fashion.

In the book she asserts that her experiences helped influence models who came after her including Cindy Crawford and Christy Turlington. She writes that she was the first to use the term "supermodel" and refers to herself as such. She recounts a particular exchange with her agent Monique Pillard who asked her: "Janice, you are working night and day. Who do you think you are, superman?" Dickinson responded: "No, honey. I'm supermodel."

Dickinson remembers relationships with fellow celebrities including Sylvester Stallone, Liam Neeson, Warren Beatty, Mick Jagger, and Jack Nicholson. She enjoys her celebrity status and her time with friends John Belushi, Truman Capote, and Andy Warhol. Belushi and Dickinson enable each other's predilections for abusing drugs. She regularly spends time at Studio 54 during this period. Dickinson recounts a darker side of celebrity, and writes that she trusted in Bill Cosby when he informed her he could help her career in show business, only to experience verbal anger from him when she said she was too tired to engage in sexual activity with him.

She was supported during her career by her friendship with actor Bruce Willis and her positive connections with her sisters. She reflects on the nature of her marriages and looks back on her prior self-indulgent lifestyle. She explains to the reader how personal achievement may result from the allure of success, and simultaneously cautions against harmful byproducts of behavioral insecurity inherent in the mystique of celebrity.

== Publication history ==
The book was published in hardcover format by HarperCollins in 2002 under its imprint ReganBooks in the United States. Another edition was released the same year in the United Kingdom. The book was re-published in both formats in 2003, with a new cover. ReganBooks released a subsequent edition in 2004 with a third cover re-design. HarperCollins published eBook formats of the work in 2007 and 2008. Three editions of the book were published under its third cover design in 2009.

Warner Bros. purchased the film rights to the book in 2004. Dickinson subsequently turned her works into a trilogy of three books. She followed up on No Lifeguard on Duty with Everything About Me Is Fake – And I'm Perfect in 2004, and Check, Please! – Dating, Mating, and Extricating in 2006.

== Reception ==
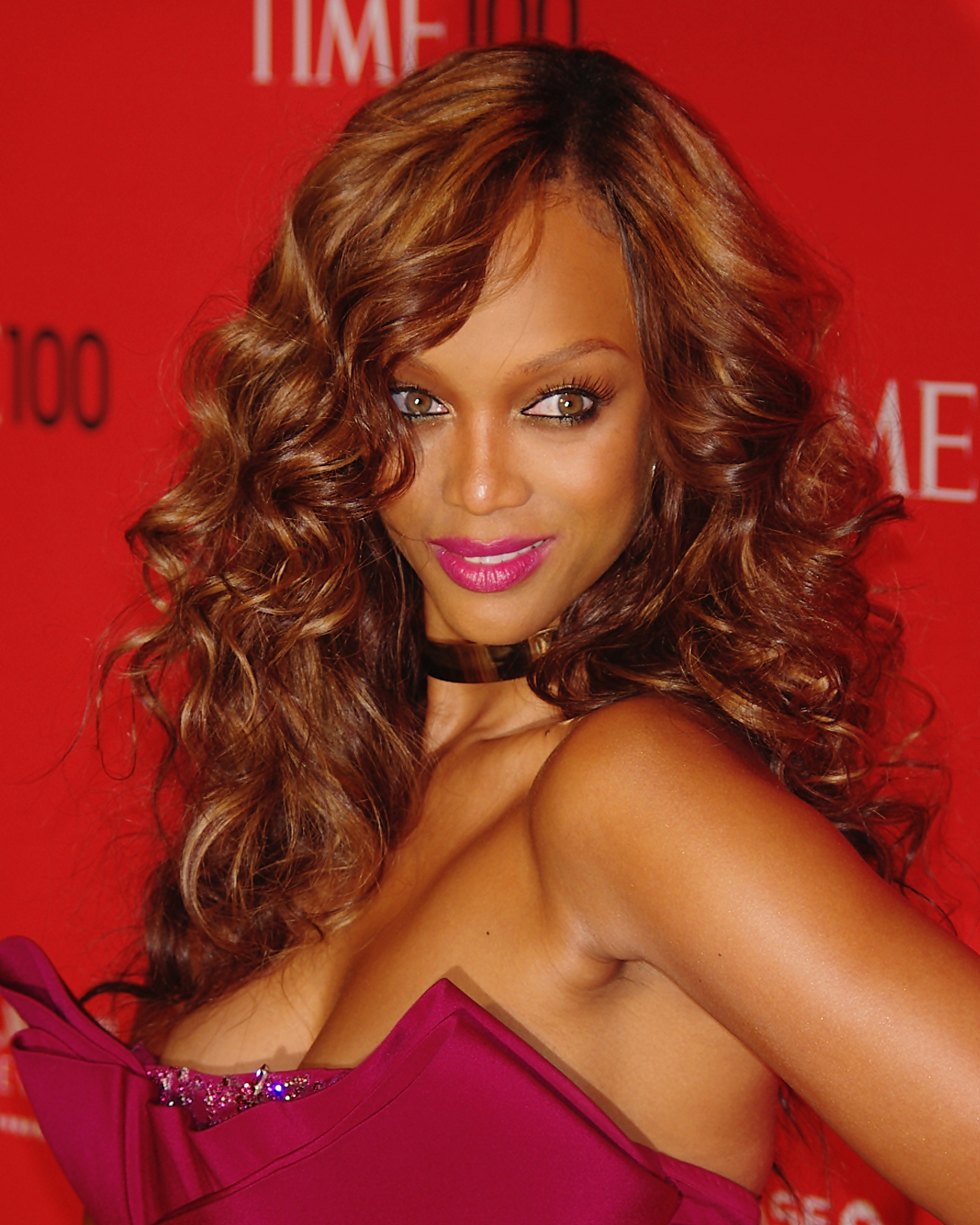
After reading No Lifeguard on Duty, Tyra Banks decided to make Janice Dickinson a judge on her television program America's Next Top Model.

No Lifeguard on Duty received a favorable review from Publishers Weekly. The review concluded: "The book is sometimes predictable and psychologically simplistic, but Dickinson comes across as a triumphant survivor. Her willingness to recognize her own flaws makes it easy to relate to her positive message and should inspire readers searching for solutions to career and personal conflicts." The review praised the author's ability at being: "honest enough to acknowledge the stimulating aspects of success and glamour, explaining why they lure insecure personalities and imprison them past the point of no return." Women's Wear Daily reviewed the book and wrote: "What keeps the book from becoming too tawdry is Dickinson's sense of humor. She applies a healthy dose to both her conquests and disaster's alike."

In a 2002 article, Knight Ridder Newspapers characterized the book as: "a brave, profane memoir of her escape from childhood abuse into the even more risky whirl of bright lights, big cities and spiraling self-destruction." A subsequent article in 2003 by Knight Ridder Newspapers wrote: "what makes Dickinson's tome stand out from all the other Hollywood memoirs is that she has a cheeky sense of humor about her self-absorption." Philip Weiss of The New York Observer wrote: "I read No Lifeguard on Duty at once and wasn't disappointed. Janice Dickinson is a funny and fluid narrator." Of the author's path to success recounted in the book, the International Herald Tribune wrote: "Janice Dickinson had a cometlike trajectory as an early supermodel in the 1980s, which she has recounted in her raunchy life story".

== Impact ==
While reading Dickinson's book, English novelist Jackie Collins ran into the author at a bookstore and asked the fellow author to lunch to discuss their mutual experiences. Janice Dickinson landed a television role as a judge on the program America's Next Top Model due to No Lifeguard on Duty. Show creator Tyra Banks explained to The Boston Herald her decision process: "The reason why I hired Janice Dickinson is because I read her book (No Lifeguard on Duty: The Accidental Life of the World's First Supermodel), and that book represented every single thing that I have never done. Every single thing that I have never experienced."

Banks elaborated that she wanted a judge on the program that had gone through issues in her modeling career that she herself had not: "I sit all the time and talk to girls and say, 'Don't drink. Don't smoke. Don't go out. Don't do this. I never did it.' But there's only so much you can preach to someone if you've never done it. I thought I could have someone like Janice because she's so outrageous." Banks stated that she thought Dickinson provided a warning to models not to follow the path she had taken because it had proved dangerous:" When she's telling a girl, 'Don't do this,' she's saying, 'Don't do this because it didn't work for me.' I thought it was a good balance."

After serving as a judge on the program for four seasons, Dickinson's spot was filled with Twiggy Lawson in 2005 for the show's fifth season. In December of the same year, Oxygen Network hired Dickinson for its new reality modeling television program which at the time was initially titled The Janice Dickinson Project. It centered on her efforts to launch her own business with a modeling agency. Her television show launched in 2006, titled: The Janice Dickinson Modeling Agency.

In a November 18, 2014 interview with Dickinson on Entertainment Tonight, she stated the initial version of No Lifeguard on Duty was different from what became the final published product. Dickinson said she wrote about a traumatic experience where she said Bill Cosby sexually assaulted her in 1982 at a hotel in Lake Tahoe, California. She stated that Cosby supplied her with red wine and then medicated her with drugs and subsequently raped her at the hotel. According to Dickinson, both Cosby himself and his attorneys persuaded the author and her publisher HarperCollins to delete mention of the incident from her book prior to publication. A few hours after the interview was publicized on Entertainment Tonight, Netflix made the decision to postpone its Cosby comedy film special Bill Cosby 77 from its lineup.

Martin Singer, an attorney representing Cosby, made a statement in which he asserted Dickinson was not being truthful in her account. After Singer's statement, Dickinson reappeared on a subsequent broadcast of Entertainment Tonight to reassert her account from her prior interview on the program. In addition, she publicized photographs she took with a Polaroid camera of Cosby wearing a checkered bathrobe in order to support her assertions. In the interview with Kevin Frazier she stated her account was the truth: "It is not a lie. It is my right as a woman. I have to speak up and you have to be able to go in and just be brave and do it for all the women that can't come forward." She explained her motivation for going public and her desire for her voice to be heard: "The loss of innocence that I suffered and that these women suffered is why I'm sitting here today. And I don't care about what Cosby or networks or anybody says, you will hear me."

== See also ==
- Cover model
- List of people from Florida
- List of people from Brooklyn, New York
- List of Vogue cover models
- List of women writers
