= List of Celebrity Rehab with Dr. Drew episodes =

List of all episodes of the VH1 reality television series Celebrity Rehab with Dr. Drew:

== Season 1: 2008 ==
No. overall	No. in season	Title	Original release date
1	1	"Intake"	January 10, 2008
In the series premiere Brigitte Nielsen, Chyna, Jeff Conaway, Daniel Baldwin, Seth Binzer, Mary Carey, Jaimee Foxworth and Jessica Sierra are introduced, as are their stories of addiction. Dr Drew begins to analyze and assess his patients' struggles through a series of one-on-one meetings, but his attention is pulled away by Jeff, who has a seizure and has to be rushed to hospital.
2	2	"Detox"	January 17, 2008
The patients watch Jeff's difficult struggle with detox in horror and ponder their own difficult struggles ahead. Overwhelmed, Jessica spirals into an emotional tailspin, but she finds some solace when Brigitte comforts her about her broken relationship with her drug addicted, prostitute mother. While Jeff continues to battle his withdrawal symptoms in the hospital, emotions flare for the rest of the group when it is revealed that Jeff brought drugs into the rehab.
3	3	"New Arrival"	January 24, 2008
Jeff returns from the hospital, but as he continues to detox, Drew lectures Jeff's co-dependent girlfriend Vikki about how her own bad habits may kill Jeff. During Process Group on Day 5, Jeff and Daniel get into a heated argument over Jeff's conduct in rehab. Later, Ultimate Fighting Champion Ricco Rodriguez arrives at the clinic, and immediately comes into conflict with Shelly and Jessica. Drew works with Mary Carey on how to leave behind her porn star lifestyle, but her behavior when cavorting with the others in the pool provokes Daniel, who feels his sobriety threatened.
4	4	"Sex and Trauma"	January 31, 2008
The patients deal with their painful pasts, as many of them were affected by physical, sexual or mental trauma at a very early age, which Dr. Drew addresses in a group session. Newly married Daniel feels the environment is not conducive to his sobriety, and cites issues with the production process and impending work as reasons he may leave, but Dr. Drew discovers that he wishes to leave because of the inappropriate text messages that he had sent to Mary.
5	5	"Bye Bye Baldwin"	February 7, 2008
The cast reacts to learning about the inappropriate text messaging between Daniel and Mary, so Dr. Drew is charged with pulling the group back together. In an attempt to put her porn star persona behind her, Mary reawakens her sober youth by revisiting ballet. Chyna also starts to open up, as she is pushed to her emotional limits by Dr. Drew's questions as to why she is in rehab if she is not truly an addict. Jeff's journey also hits a nerve when he berates his girlfriend Vikki for bringing alcohol into the unit.
6	6	"Friends and Family"	February 14, 2008
Jeff again renews his quest to quit. As their stay in rehab nears its end, Dr. Drew begins to prepare the group to live a sober life in the real world. The first step to that end is to bring friends and family into the unit, as they are the people with whom the patients will depend on most during their continued recovery. During this time, the effects of the patients' addictions on their loved ones is explored.
7	7	"Retreat"	February 21, 2008
The end of rehab is now approaching and rehabbers must seriously start making plans for sober living, and contemplates the question of success and failure. Dr. Drew plans a trip for them to Catalina, where the rehabbers will get a feel of being back in the regular world. The plan runs into difficulties when some of the patients do not stick to the program. Upon returning to the recovery center, Jeff finally makes good on his threats and leaves for good. Seth decides to blow off steam by starting a food fight.
8	8	"The Disease is Winning"	February 28, 2008
After the Catalina fiasco and food fight, a fed up Dr. Drew tells the group continued behavior of that sort will jeopardize their recovery. He also reveals to VH1 is going to pay for three months in a sober living facility for anyone who wants it, and recommends they all accept the offer. The patients, however, are reluctant. As graduation approaches, it is unclear who will graduate and who will be willing to go to sober living.
9	9	"Graduation"	March 6, 2008
The entire group graduates. Jessica, Mary, and Seth agree to enter a sober living facility.
10	10	"Reunion"	March 13, 2008
The cast reunites and discusses their lives since filming. Daniel Baldwin has opted not to appear, and Jessica Sierra was forbidden to do so by a judge following a drug-related arrest. Sentenced to a year in rehab, Sierra was back at the Pasadena Recovery Center at the time of the reunion's taping.

== Season 2: 2008 ==
No. overall	No. in season	Title	Original release date
1	11	TBA	October 23, 2008
In the second season premiere Steven Adler, Rodney King, Jeff Conaway, Tawny Kitaen, Amber Smith, Sean Stewart, Nikki McKibbin and Gary Busey arrive at the clinic, and reveal their painful pasts with addiction. Dr. Drew begins to analyze and assess his patients' struggles through a series of one-on-one meetings, but his attention is pulled away by Gary, who thought he was there as a counselor instead of a patient.
2	12	TBA	October 30, 2008
Gary is feeling insecure about his place amongst the patients. He insists he is there to provide assistance and guidance, and not to receive care, much to Dr. Drew's concern. It is unclear yet whether Gary will be able to join the group, or keep setting himself apart from it.
3	13	TBA	November 6, 2008
On Day 4 of treatment, the patients have begun to emerge from the painful symptoms of withdrawal, at which point Dr. Drew feels they exploring the feelings from which their addictions originated. One of the first steps in doing this is figuring out what sort of community the current group of patients is forming, and assessing whether they will bond over their common illness, or be splintered by emerging conflicts.
4	14	TBA	November 13, 2008
As the patients face tough emotional issues while they explore what is behind their addictive behavior, Dr. Drew asks them about their relationship with their mothers. Steven's abandonment issues, for example, are a direct result of a dysfunctional relationship with his mother. Amber shares that she was forced to support her drug-addicted mother at a very young age. Nikki can also relate, as her mother's death was a result of many years of alcohol and drug abuse.
5	15	TBA	November 20, 2008
Jeff Conaway calls 9-1-1 and informed the authorities that he's being held against his will. The police arrive and Jeff tells them he's in pain and wants to go home, but Dr. Drew is worried that Jeff is suicidal or will accidentally overdose on medication. Jeff admits to the police that he talks about suicide but has no intention of seriously entertaining it. The police recommend Jeff remain at the Pasadena Recovery Center, or go to Las Encinas Hospital, as they do not feel comfortable sending him home.
6	16	TBA	November 27, 2008
Drew tries to talk with Steven and his mother about their past. During Family and Friends Weekend, Drew tries to get the group to reach out to their loved ones to address the issues that have plagued them. In group, the patients talk about what they've done in the past for drugs, including Amber's prostitution, and Sean's self-harm. Steven and Sean's behavior disrupt a group trip to Huntington Beach.
7	17	TBA	December 4, 2008
On Day 16, Jeff continues to struggle with his back pain, and Drew talks to him about his career prospects. Amber, Sean and Tawny work at a homeless shelter, triggering a response in Amber. Nikki struggles with her songwriting, which ceased when her mother died within the past year. Drew goes to see Season 1 patient Seth Binzer after learning he has relapsed, and enters him into the PRC. Drew talks to the group about how their past relationships played a part in their addictions.
8	18	TBA	December 11, 2008
The staff finds Seth smoking crack on the roof of the Center, triggering talk and fear of relapses among the staff and patients. Steven becomes verbally abusive toward Shelly as a result. The group inspects a sober living facility, but their reaction to it is not what Drew expected. Nikki performs sober for the first time, but Sean is angered by the club's warm-up act, and Jeff's inability to attend due to illness leads to a violent outburst toward his girlfriend, Vikki.
9	19	"Graduation!"	December 18, 2008
Drew expels Jeff for his violent outburst the previous night, and recommends he go straight to Las Encinas Hospital. Drew observes that Gary continues to see himself as separate from the group, and not an addict himself. At the graduation ceremony, the groups gives emotional testimonials to one another. Rodney, Amber, Steven, Nikki agree to go to sober living. Gary says he will not, but will go there as a speaker. Tawny and Sean will go home, but continue their recovery on an out-patient basis.

== Season 3: 2010 ==
No. overall	No. in season	Title	Original release date
1	20	"Intake"	January 7, 2010
Seven of this season's patients, Mackenzie Phillips, Mindy McCready, Lisa D'Amato, Joey Kovar, Heidi Fleiss, Dennis Rodman, and Mike Starr, arrive at the Pasadena Recovery Center, where Dr. Drew interviews them to assess their individual addiction histories. Mike is treated for an abscess stemming from his drug use. Dennis, who claims he is only there because a court ordered it, is not forthcoming in interviews, nor in the first group session.
2	21	"Detox"	January 14, 2010
Dr. Drew and Bob Forrest talk to the group about their lowest moments. Mike, whose withdrawal effects are the worst of the group, suffers pain, nausea, and paranoia, and his destructive behavior, which Drew feels is psychotic, may threaten his stay at the Center. Dr. Drew speaks with Lisa about her childhood sexual abuse. Dennis continues to deny he is an addict or cooperate with the program, despite the potential legal consequences. Drew and Bob are concerned that Tom Sizemore, who was scheduled to be a patient, has still not shown up. Mindy suffers a seizure.
3	22	"Dealing with the Past"	January 21, 2010
Mindy is rushed to the hospital following her seizure, and learns of brain damage stemming from past domestic abuse. As the group begins to get past the effects of withdrawal, they talk about the effect that money and friendship have on their happiness. Drew also ponders Heidi's attachment to her birds, to the exclusion of relationships with people. After a run-in with the police, Tom Sizemore finally arrives at the clinic, but is not fully committed to remaining. Both he and Heidi, who were previously in relationship that included domestic abuse, react to seeing each other.
4	23	"New Patients"	January 28, 2010
The patients talk about how lies play a part in their addiction. Tom talks to Drew about his history of addiction. Joey, who talks about his childhood search for acceptance, has an argument with his girlfriend, Nikki, and is later observed to be tense and aggressive toward the camera people. As the numbing effects of the drugs wear off, Drew takes the group to a junkyard, where they direct their aggression onto derelict cars as a form of expressive therapy. Drew receives a call from Sex Rehab alumnus Kari Ann Peniche, who is addicted to speed, and brings her to the clinic.
5	24	"Loss"	February 4, 2010
Kari Ann arrives at the clinic, where crystal meth is found in her luggage, and where she resumes the difficult behavior she displayed previously on Sex Rehab. Drew speaks with Heidi about how her mixed feelings about Tom's presence affects their treatment. He also tells Tom's girlfriend, Monroe, whom the staff believes is also an addict, that she also needs to seek treatment in order to make their home environment safe for Tom's rehabilitation. The group speaks to a woman who killed a doctor while driving while intoxicated. The episode ends with Tom telling Drew that he is leaving the clinic.
6	25	"Triggers"	February 11, 2010
Monroe convinces Tom to remain in rehab, and decides to check in herself. Drew and Bob talk to the group about trust issues. When the others react to Kari Ann's tendency to isolate herself, she lashes out at them, Mackenzie in particular. Dennis asserts that he will never stop drinking, but after receiving a brain scan, he has a breakthrough. On Day 8 of treatment, Celebrity Rehab alumni Brigitte Nielsen, Amber Smith and Jessica Sierra visit the clinic to speak to the group. Mackenzie receives painful news from home, and after consulting with Dr. Drew, leaves the clinic to attend to a personal matter.
7	26	"Family Weekend"	February 18, 2010
At a lake retreat for the patients, which represents the first contact with loved ones for most of them, Drew has Mike address his past trauma, including his guilt over the death of his best friend and Alice in Chains bandmate, Layne Staley, whose mother meets with him. Other family members who discuss their feelings are Kari Ann's brothers, Joey's mother, and Dennis' estranged wife, who says she intends to divorce him. On Day 17, the patients put on a dinner for their loved ones, but Heidi isolates herself from the group, and then leaves the dinner, saying that she's leaving rehab.
8	27	"Acting Out"	February 25, 2010
Heidi returns to rehab following a vehicular accident that badly damages her car. Kari Ann and Mike violate the rules on nudity, resulting in an administrative discussion between Drew and his staff on how to discipline them, as well as a discussion among the others, and Kari Ann's statement that she is leaving rehab.
9	28	"Graduation"	March 4, 2010
Drew convinces Kari Ann to return. He later expresses concern that the group been a difficult one, especially Heidi, Dennis and Kari Ann. Believing they all need sober living, he sees this graduation as a somber warning rather than a celebration. During the ceremony, the patients exchange testimonials, though Kari Ann and Heidi have harsh words for Mackenzie and Tom, respectively. Kari Ann, Mike, Heidi, Tom and Dennis will go to sober living. Joey will get a sponsor, go to meetings and then sober living after his girlfriend moves into their new home. Not going are Mindy, who needs to return to her son, and will instead attend Al-Anon, Lisa, who also will go to meetings, and Mackenzie. A title card before the closing credits dedicates the episode to Drew's father Morton, who died on October 27, 2009.

== Season 4: 2010–2011 ==
No. overall	No. in season	Title	Original release date	U.S. viewers (millions)
1	29	TBA	December 1, 2010	1.2
In the season premiere, the eight patients assemble at the Pasadena Recovery Center, and relate their personal histories with drugs. Jason Davis insults Janice Dickinson and touches her in a way that sparks a war of words between them. Drew has a one-on-one with Rachel Uchitel, who describes to him the effect of her father's death and the death of her fiancee in the September 11 attacks. During the night of Day 1, Janice has an emotional conversation with Will Smith, one of the Center's rehab technicians, who tries to comfort her as she confesses to suicidal thoughts and experiences a panic attack.
2	30	TBA	December 1, 2010	1.2
Will contacts Drew, who helps him deal with Janice's panic attack. On Day 2, Drew talks to the group about the emotions that led the members of the group to substance abuse, except for Leif Garrett who, still detoxing from heroin, joins the others later. A talk with Francine "Frankie" Lons, who says she wants to drink, worries Drew that she will try to find reasons to leave treatment. He must also deal with the conflict between Jason and Janice. Rachel talks about her tendency to enter impulsively into intense relationships in a one-on-one with Drew, who feels she suffers from love addiction, in addition to substance abuse. Jeremy London relates the incident in which he says he was kidnapped and forced to take drugs. On Day 3, Visitor's Day, Jason continues to insult Janice while she enjoys time with her boyfriend. Frankie becomes outraged at the notion that the security cameras in the bedrooms are used to watch her when undressed.
3	31	TBA	December 8, 2010	0.9
Shelly and Program Administrator Shirley Bennett reassure Frankie, convincing her to stay. When Drew encourages the patients to talk about the traumas that led to their addiction, Jeremy talks about a horrific car accident his wife, Melissa Cunningham, and son were in, and Jason Davis talks about the deleterious effect of wealth on his life. Melissa, who was in treatment herself in a different wing of the clinic, and is now estranged from Jeremy, visits to talk with Jeremy, Drew and Bob Forrest about their marriage and their son, who was placed in child protective services because of their addiction. Jason Davis discusses how his dependence on others is related to his condition. Rachel deals with the media's reaction to her presence in rehab. During a group trip to the beach on Day 5, Leif, whose detox from heroin makes him irritable and unpredictable, threatens to leave treatment, citing the behavior of the others.
4	32	TBA	December 15, 2010	0.6
As the first week of treatment ends, the patients' withdrawal symptoms cause them to be agitated and hypersensitive toward one another. Eric begins to open up about his past. The bickering between Janice Dickinson and Rachel Utichel causes Rachel to leave the facility on the evening of Day 7.
5	33	TBA	December 15, 2010	0.6
On Day 8, the group reacts to Rachel's departure, her conflict with Janice, and the traumatic feelings of abandonment Drew says addicts suffer from. Frankie and Jason Davis again exchange insults, bringing Frankie to tears. Rachel returns to the clinic that day, but Janice's irritation over the circumstances of her departure and return bring her into conflict with both Rachel and Eric. Drew opines that Rachel did not leave because of Janice, but because of her feelings of abandonment, and that leaving was her way of testing the rest of the group. Following a talk with therapist Sherry Gaba, Janice has another panic attack.
6	34	TBA	December 22, 2010	1.1
Continuing from the previous episode, Janice has a severe panic attack on Day 8. Anticipating the feelings of guilt that arise for addicts in this stage of treatment, Drew talks to the group about forgiveness. Frankie collapses from severe withdrawal symptoms. On Day 10, Eric's wife, Eliza, talks about how his addiction affects them. On Day 11, Drew, wanting the group to understand the effect their addiction has on their families, takes them to Shields for Families, a program in which they hear testimonials from recovering addicts who lost custody of their children. On Day 12 Drew speaks to Keaton Simons, Eric's stepson, himself a recovering addict who is open-minded yet skeptical about a reconciliation with Eric. In the middle of the night on Day 13, Jason Davis unsuccessfully tries to leave the clinic in secret, resulting in a 12-hour restriction, and the arrival of the police.
7	35	TBA	December 29, 2010	TBA
Jason must deal first with the police, and then with Drew and his staff, following his attempt to leave the facility in the middle of the night. Eric and Keaton speak with Eliza and Dr. Drew, and reconcile. On Day 14, Drew and his colleague, a clinical psychologist named Dr. Michael Farinha, Ph.D, meet with the group and their loved ones, to discuss how addiction affects their family relationships. On Day 15, after a musical performance for the group by Keaton that brings Eric to tears, Bob Forrest and Shelly take the group to Hollywood Recovery Services, a treatment center they opened on Hollywood and Vine, in order to help the group prepare for sobriety in the outside world, but Frankie and Leif are in danger of succumbing to temptation.
8	36	TBA	January 5, 2011	TBA
Continuing from the previous episode, Bob and Shelly's attempts to convince the addicts that they will need a strong aftercare program results in Leif's nearly succumbing to temptation, and Shelly's belief that he needs to be discharged from the program. On Day 16, Jeremy learns Melissa sold damaging and false information about him to The National Enquirer, about which he confronts her. In group, Drew asks the patients to talk about their worst "bottom" moment. On Day 17, the group is visited by Rehab alumni Tom Sizemore, Mike Starr and Mackenzie Phillips, who share their accounts of recovery from addiction. Jeremy and Melissa attempt to put their conflict aside in order to discuss matters, including their son, Lyrik, with Drew. The practice of having the patients remove from their cell phones the contact information of those who threaten their sobriety leads to an argument between Frankie and Shelly.
9	37	TBA	January 12, 2011	0.9
On Day 18, with graduation approaching, Drew and Bob talk to the addicts in process group about their aftercare plans. Drew, observing that Frankie's volatility has increased since she began sharing a room with Janice, tries to talk to her about the childhood abuse inflicted upon her by her grandmother. On Day 19, Janice talks to Drew and Shelly about the irritability she's been experiencing due to Ativan withdrawal, and her memories of childhood abuse, leading to an emotional moment between her, Frankie and Rachel. Drew has the group meet a family that was devastated by drugs. Jason, who Drew says is his most dangerous patient, defiantly refuses Drew's aftercare recommendations, even after Drew and his staff confront him about his poor health, and insist that he enter an in-patient program in Malibu.
10	38	TBA	January 19, 2011	1.3
In the season finale, Drew and Bob continue to question the addicts about their aftercare plans, though Janice, Jason and Leif are still resistant. At graduation, Drew and Shelly exchange testimonials with the patients. Jason, despite his earlier obstinance, agrees to the in-patient program recommended by Drew. After graduation, Drew and Rachel visit the World Trade Center site and the Central Park Boathouse in Manhattan, in order to help her address the unresolved grief of losing her fiance, Andrew, on 9/11.
11	39	"Reunion"	January 26, 2011	1.04
In this reunion show broadcast live from Los Angeles on January 26, 2011, the recovering addicts reunite six months after they concluded their treatment. They, along with Drew, Shelly and Bob, and talk about their experiences in attaining sobriety, and their lives since filming their time in recovery. Also appearing are alumni Amber Smith, Mackenzie Phillips, Lisa D'Amato, Jessica Sierra, and Sober House star Jennifer Gimenez.

== Season 5: 2011 ==
No. overall	No. in season	Title	Original release date	U.S. viewers (millions)
1	40	"Intake"	June 26, 2011	1.06
Six of this season's nine addicts arrive at the Pasadena Recovery Center, and consult with Dr. Drew. Jennifer Gimenez, who is now a rehab technician at the Center, is particularly nervous that Steven Adler, who was abusive to her during their time on Sober House, will be among the patients.
2	41	"Detox"	July 3, 2011	1.03
Steven apologizes to Jennifer, thanking her for reporting him to the police, as it helped his recovery. During their first night, the patients experience the physical and emotional symptoms of withdrawal, and by the morning of Day 2, Bai finds herself too emotional to get out of bed. Dwight Gooden arrives, and is confronted by Drew after his urine tests positive for cocaine. During group, Michael Lohan discusses how the abuse he received at the hands of his alcoholic father has come full circle, and Amy Fisher discusses her sensitivity towards the judgment of others, to which Jeremy Jackson expresses sympathy. Amy, expressing an aversion to the cameras, walks out of the clinic, but is convinced to return. She later laments to Drew that public perception of her makes it impossible to find work outside of porn, which requires her to "numb" herself with alcohol. On Day 3, Bai Ling, who has not eaten in three days, nor taken her prescribed Abilify, acts erratically, and seeks refuge on the roof.
3	42	"Awakening Emotions"	July 10, 2011	1.1
After the staff coaxes Bai off the roof, Drew and Nurse Sasha Kusina convince her to take her psychiatric medication. During Process Group on Day 5, Michael and Steven express outrage at Amy's comparison of rehab to prison. In a one-on-one with Drew, Sean discusses her feelings of failure and lack of confidence resulting from her destructive career decisions. Jessica "Sugar" Kiper arrives at the clinic and describes to Drew her addictions and traumas. On Day 6, the group participates in equine therapy, which produces emotional reactions for Jessica and Sean. Amy's refusal to identify as an addict during Morning Meditation on Day 7 provokes harsh words from Steven, resulting in a tearful Amy threatening to leave the clinic again.
4	43	"Triggers and Regret"	July 17, 2011	1.05
On Day 7, Steven is repeatedly admonished that his attacks upon Amy interfere with her rehabilitation and the group's. During Process Group, Sugar reveals that she tried to hurt herself during her second appearance on Survivor. Drew talks with Dwight, who bears guilt over his drug use's effect upon his children. On Day 8, the patients meet the family of Patrick Frantz, who relate how his death from a drug overdose affected them. On Day 9, Dr. John Sharp of Harvard University Medical School's Department of Psychiatry oversees Dwight's first meeting in years with his son, Dwight Jr. On Day 10, Steven again attacks Amy for her comments on her addiction, and says he's leaving the clinic, which Drew says is due to his aggression when detoxing.
5	44	"Wreckage From the Past"	July 24, 2011	1.1
After walking out of the clinic, Steven changes his mind and comes back. After Drew and Dr. Sharp speak to him and decide to keep a closer eye on him, Steven apologizes to Amy. During the Day 11 Process Group, the patients discuss their regret and loss, in particular a tearful Bai, who suffers an anxiety attack. She later discusses the sexual abuse she suffered during a one-on-one with Drew. To instill hope in the patients, they are brought to Homeboy Industries, which aids recovering addicts and former gang-involved youth with job training and placement. Michael attempts to have his ex-fiancée, Kate Major, fly out for family weekend, but her own addiction leads to conflict between them. Bob Forrest counsels Michael that he needs to distance himself from such people, but on Day 13, after the staff forbid Kate from visiting Michael unless she enrolls herself in a treatment program, Michael announces that he is leaving the clinic.
6	45	"Family Weekend"	July 31, 2011	1.05
Drew clears matters with Kate and Michael, who remains in the clinic. On Day 14, as part of Family Weekend, the patients and their loved ones discuss how addiction has affected their families with Drew and Dr. Michael Farina, who also speak with each family separately. During this, Drew urges Jessica to cancel a U.S.O. tour in order abstain from traveling for at least three months, and urges Michael and Kate to abstain from reestablishing their relationship for at least one year. During dinner on Day 15, the group enjoys a performance by Season 2 alumna Nikki McKibbin, who has been sober for three years, but remarks about Amy lead to a panic attack for Jeremy's sister, Taylor, and a confrontation between Amy's husband Lou, Jeremy and the police.
7	46	"The Trouble With Loved Ones"	August 7, 2011	0.71
Jeremy makes amends with Lou and Amy, and decides not to press charges. During the Day 16 Process Group, Drew tries to help the group learn from the emotional family weekend. Drew and Dr. Sharp talk to Lou and Amy about her adult film career, her inability to communicate with Lou, and her feelings of guilt. Michael's conflict with Kate, who is reluctant to enter in-patient treatment, continues, and when he intends to invite her for visitor's night on Day 17, Drew advises him that being around people like her who enrage him might trigger his serious heart problems. Despite this, he has another argument with Kate regarding a TMZ.com story on him, and after walking out of the clinic, is confronted by the police.
8	47	"Preparing for Discharge"	August 14, 2011	0.86
The police decide not to arrest Michael, and Drew reiterates his order to him and Kate not to see each other. On Day 18, Drew has the patients discuss the previous night's events during Process Group, during which Michael makes tearful admissions, bringing the group closer together, much to Drew's reassurance. On Day 19, Jessica express fear of failing to maintain her sobriety, and Drew and Bob try to convince her to enter sober living. Drew and Dr. Sharp speak with Sean and her husband, Robert, who is also an alcoholic. After dietary supplements arrive in the mail for Jeremy, who has been advised to cease taking all supplements on account of his enlarged liver and elevated enzymes, Drew has Bob go to his house to clean out all of his drugs. Steven, who was friends with Mike Starr, reacts to news of his death. A memorial title card for Starr closes the episode.
9	48	"Graduation"	August 21, 2011	0.97
On Day 20, in the final Process Group, the patients discuss how they will maintain their sobriety following the next day's graduation. They are later visited by Season 4 alumni Rachel Uchitel, Eric Roberts and Jason Davis, who relate their stories of addiction and sobriety. On Day 21, the patients are instructed to write symbolic letters to their addiction, which they read aloud and then burn at the ceremony. Despite the emotional testimonials given by the participants, Drew and Bob continue to express concern over Jessica's continued refusal to enter sober living.
10	49	"Celebrity Rehab Season 5 Revisited (Part 1)"	September 4, 2011	0.51
In Part 1 of this update special, Drew and Bob check in with Bai, Michael, Jeremy and Amy 150 days after discharge to see they have all maintained their sobriety. Bai has returned to film, and prefers practicing martial arts to club-hopping. Drew and Bob feel that Michael's devotion to helping other addicts will conflict with his own early recovery, and insist he go to Alcoholics Anonymous and see a therapist. Jeremy has lost 20 lbs., and is down to 180 lbs. He consults a nutritionist for his vitamin use and has reunited with a long-lost girlfriend. Amy quit making adult films, but declines Bob's recommendation to meet with Mary Jo Buttafuoco, explaining that she has already apologized to her numerous times.
11	50	"Celebrity Rehab Season 5 Revisited (Part 2)"	September 11, 2011	0.51
In Part 2, Drew and Bob check in with Sean, Jessica, Dwight and Steven. Sean has slipped on three occasions, and she and Bob discuss how Robert's drinking affects her own sobriety. Jessica, who relapsed with marijuana and alcohol about a month after discharge, insists that she can control her usage, but Drew and Bob convince her to enter sober living. Dwight is maintaining his sobriety, though Bob cautions himself against the typical relapses that he has suffered from in the past. Bob is upset with Steven, however, who open drinks and does marijuana in front of him, and then lies about it, which he has never done in their 20 year friendship. Bob is also upset at the number of mutual friends of theirs who died from addiction. Drew relates that Steven checked into rehab two days later, but checked back out after only two days.

== Season 6: 2012 ==
No. overall	No. in season	Title	Original release date	U.S. viewers (millions)
1	51	"Intake"	September 16, 2012	TBA
A new group of non-celebrity addicts in their 20s and 30s arrive at the Pasadena Recovery Center, and share their stories of addiction. The first five, Eric, Ashleigh, Erika, Michael and Deanna, arrive in the season premiere.
2	52	"Detox"	September 23, 2012	TBA
On Day 2, the patients are experiencing withdrawal. Ashleigh's is so severe that she receives large doses of medication to remain medically stable. The patients have their first Group Process with Dr. Drew and Bob Forrest. Eric talks about his guilt, while Deanna and Erika discuss the abuse they suffered. Later, with the arrival of Cinnamon, Heather and Drewbee at the clinic, the group now numbers eight. Erika, Eric and Michael react negatively to Drewbee. Deanna experiences burning skin and a heightened pulse as a result of withdrawal, and fears she is having a panic attack. Although Dr. Drew gives her some medication to decrease her anxiety, her heart palpitations continue into the night.
3	53	"Awakening Emotions"	September 30, 2012	TBA
After being diagnosed with both severe withdrawal and acute panic, Deanna returns to the clinic in stable condition. On Day 3, the patients deal with powerful emotions brought out during Process Group, including suicidal feelings that at least three of the patients indicate they have felt. Drewbee's father, Jeff, himself a recovering addict for 17 years, meets with Dr. Drew and Bob Forrest about his codependency with his son. Dr. Drew and relationship therapist Simone Bienne speak with Erika and her boyfriend, Stefanos, about how his drug use is harmful to her recovery. After Erika exhibits suspicious behavior, she is given a drug test, which yields positive results.
4	54	"Tapering Off"	October 3, 2012	TBA
Continuing from the previous episode, the staff determine that Cymbalta Erika was given caused her positive drug test results, and created elevated serotonin levels that caused her unusual behavior. In Process Group, Cinnamon expresses anger at her mother, who tells her she should be with her family instead of in rehab, but Erika's response to this leads to a conflict between the two. Michael talks about his regret over giving up tae kwon do. An agitated Eric talks to Drew about the feelings of betrayal he harbors toward his mother, also a recovering addict, who left the country when he was 16. Dr. Drew expresses concern over Michael and Ashleigh's inability to expressing their emotions, which he says will threaten their ability to remain sober. Ashleigh's irritation with how the others treat their surroundings leads to a fight with Eric during a Hollywood Hills hike on Day 7.
4	54	"Anger Management"	October 7, 2012	TBA
Continuing from the previous episode, Eric and Ashleigh to argue over household cleanliness after their hike on Day 7. While discussing fear with Shelly during Morning Meditation on Day 8, Cinnamon, when asked about returning to performing in clubs, denies that alcohol is a trigger for her, and says that her career is more important than her sobriety. Erika's irritation with Cinnamon's boisterousness and the attention she feels she draws to herself leads to an argument in Process Group, though they later make amends. On Day 9, Cinnamon expresses feelings of deep guilt over throwing away a baby that was born to her when she was four months pregnant.
5	55	"The Halfway Point"	October 14, 2012	TBA
On Day 10, the patients begin to improve as they approach the midpoint of their stay at the clinic, though Drewbee acts agitated and paranoid from the others, causing conflict that Dr. Drew feels is caused by his continued withdrawal from drugs. Michael goes to a tae kwon do cast in order to reconnect with one of his past passions, while the others go to an Alcoholics Anonymous meeting. Eric and Drewbee leave the meeting, which leads to a tense confrontation with other people on the street and later a heated exchange between him, Heather and Cinnamon back at the clinic, after which Eric decides to leave the clinic.
6	56	"Things Get Worse Before They Get Better"	October 21, 2012	TBA
Continuing from the previous episode, Bob finds Eric wandering Pasadena and brings him back to the clinic, but his apology and discussion over the event leads to a fight with Heather on the night of Day 10 and Deanna during Process Group on Day 11. Deanna also reacts to the release of Angel, the father of her son, from prison, and his questions over her fidelity to him while he was in prison. Drew has a one-on-one with her regarding the sexual abuse she suffered as a child, and speaks to Eric and his mother over their history. On Day 12, the group is taken to a dog park, where they speak to a motivational speaker who talks about how his work rescuing dogs helped him recovery from addiction, during which Ashleigh suffers a seizure.
7	57	"Facing the Past"	October 28, 2012	TBA
Continuing from the previous episode, on-set medics and the cast react to Ashleigh's alcohol withdrawal seizure. In Process Group on Day 13, Deanna mentions the flashbacks to being gang raped at gunpoint by six men when she was a drug dealer. Ashleigh talks about witnessing her sister, who is 19 months her junior, being molested. The staff are particularly concerned about the enabling environment that Drewbee and Michael will return to. Drew talks to Erika, who is upset at the prospect of not having family present at the upcoming Family Weekend. Cinnamon tries to repair her relationship with her father, Mario, a recovering addict and former gang member, who conceived her when he was 16, and was not a substantial presence in her life. Drew and Bob speak with Drewbee about his father's co-dependency, and to his parents, who react to Drewbee's refusal to go to sober living.
8	58	"Family Weekend"	November 4, 2012	TBA
On Day 15, Family Weekend begins, during which the patients' families introduce themselves to the group and give testimonials about their history of dealing with addiction. Deanna's mother is confronted over her unsympathetic response to Deanna's past rape; Cinnamon and her loved ones are told she must stay in Pasadena for three months to continue her recovery. Ashleigh reveals to her mother the child molestation that Asleigh and her sister suffered as children. Cinnamon's father worries about the dangers of her relapsing after rehab, but Cinnamon is infuriated when he himself does so after Family Weekend ends. Drewbee continues to refuse to submit fully to the program, despite his parents' efforts, and on Day 16, he walks out of the clinic.
9	59	"Preparing for the Real World"	November 11, 2012	TBA
Continuing from the previous episode, Drew takes a walk with Drewbee outside the clinic, and returns with him. As the patients discuss their aftercare plans on Day 17, Erika breaks up with Stefanos. On Day 18, to illustrate that moderation does not work, Drew introduces the patients to guest speakers Audrey Kishline and Sheryl Maloy. The patients are also tasked to address the legal and financial "wreckage of their past", during which Bob accompanies Erika to Stefano's apartment for her things. After Drewbee again leaves the clinic, Drew and Dr. Sharp, believing he has an irreversible mental problem stemming from his prior head injuries, have him transferred to a hospital for a psychiatric hold.
10	60	"Graduation"	November 18, 2012	TBA
As the patients prepare for graduation, Deanna's comments lead Michael and Jasmen to doubt Deanna's future sobriety, leading to a heated exchange during the final Process Group. As a result of this and continued tension between Deanna and Jasmen, Deanna refuses to enter into the same sober living facility as Jasmen. Drew tries to get Michael to reconnect with Master Yu, the sensei and father figure with whom he has not spoken in five years. During the graduation ceremony on Day 21, the patients exchange testimonials and offer thanks to Drew for their treatment. At the end of the episode, Drew reveals that six months after graduation, all of the patients went to sober living, most of whom are still there, and that all were maintaining their sobriety.

== See also ==
- Celebrity Rehab with Dr. Drew
- Sober House
- Sex Rehab with Dr. Drew
