= Janice & Abbey =

- Also known as: Abbey & Janice: Beauty & The Best
- Starring: Janice Dickinson; Abbey Clancy
- Country of origin: United States
- No. of seasons: 1
- No. of episodes: 6

Production
- Running time: 60 minutes

Original release
- Network: Living (U.K.); Oxygen (U.S.)
- Release: February 19 – March 19, 2008

Janice & Abbey is a reality-television series following the attempt by British model Abigail Clancy to break into the American modeling market under the guidance of American supermodel Janice Dickinson. The show premiered in the United Kingdom on May 14, 2007, under the title Abbey & Janice: Beauty & The Best and had its American debut on the Oxygen television channel on February 19, 2008.

== Episodes ==
Title in UK Beauty and The Best; Series Producer Louise Cowmeadow	U.S. air date	Synopsis
Swimming With Sharks	February 19, 2008	Janice arrives in Abbey's home town of Liverpool unannounced. She begins her mentorship of Abbey by having her swim with sharks at a local aquarium. Janice relocates Abbey to London where they clash at a photo shoot.
London Calling	February 26, 2008	Abbey arrives in Los Angeles. Janice criticizes her modeling portfolio, saying Abbey has the same facial expression in every photograph. She sends Abbey to an acting coach for some pointers. Later, Janice sends Abbey out to meetings with three modeling agencies, one of which, Elite Model Management, expresses interest in representing her. Janice's hairstylist Duke and makeup artist Gabrial Geismar make Abbey over.
California Dreaming	March 4, 2008	Janice gives Abbey lessons in networking at a party and sets her up for a casting with Christian Audigier with the Ed Hardy clothing line. Abbey snatches up $5,000 worth of free clothes from the Ed Hardy store and later works the red carpet at the Art for Life Red Party.
Movers & Shakers	March 11, 2008	Abbey is thrilled to learn that Christian has cast her for Fashion Week. To try to overcome Abbey's habit of blushing, Janice sends her to Trashy Lingerie, a boutique. Abbey and Janice do some radio interviews and Janice is horrified when Abbey says to an African American DJ that she's allergic to chocolate.
Walk the Walk	March 19, 2008	Janice sets up castings for Abbey with SaturdayNight magazine for its annual swimsuit issue and the online magazine Celebrity Babylon. British breakfast television show GMTV tags along to the Celebrity Babylon test shoot. Janice engages photographer Peter Brown to build Abbey's portfolio. They do some Sports Illustrated-style shots and Abbey is thrilled with the results. Abbey meets again with Christian Audigier and they continue to prepare for Fashion Week. Janice critiques Peter's photos and is extremely pleased. She continues to try to build Abbey's confidence but Abbey grows more and more nervous.
Success?	March 19, 2008	On the day before the big fashion show, Janice drops by Abbey's hotel for intensive walking practice and Abbey continues to struggle with her self-confidence. On show day, Abbey opens and closes the show and is pleased and excited by her performance. Janice and the designer praise her, although Janice believes Abbey needs to work on firming up her behind. On Abbey's last night in Los Angeles, Janice offers final words of praise and encouragement.

== See also ==
- 2007 in British television
- 2008 in American television
- List of reality television programs
- Lists of television programs
- List of television spinoffs
