= Sean Hannity =

American television host and political commentator (born 1961)

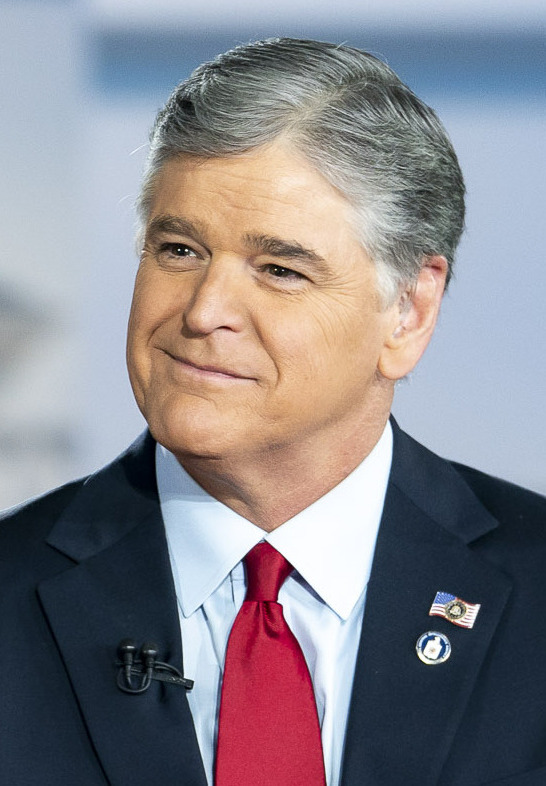
- Hannity in 2020
- Born: Sean Patrick Hannity; December 30, 1961 (age 64); New York City, U.S.
- Occupations: Television presenter; broadcaster; writer
- Employer(s): Premiere Networks, Fox News
- Political party: Conservative Party of New York State
- Spouse: Jill Rhodes (m. 1993; div. 2019) Ainsley Earhardt (m. 2026)
- Children: 2
- Website: hannity.com

Sean Patrick Hannity (born December 30, 1961) is an American conservative television presenter, political commentator, broadcaster and writer. He hosts The Sean Hannity Show, a nationally syndicated talk radio show, has hosted a self-titled political commentary program on Fox News since 2009, and co-hosted the original Fox News debate show Hannity & Colmes with Alan Colmes from the network's founding in 1996 to 2009.

Hannity volunteered as a talk show host at UC Santa Barbara in 1989. He later joined WVNN in Athens, Alabama, and shortly afterward, WGST in Atlanta. After leaving WGST, he worked at WABC in New York until 2013. Since 2014, Hannity has worked at WOR. In 1996, Hannity and Alan Colmes co-hosted Hannity & Colmes on Fox. After Colmes announced his departure in January 2008, Hannity merged the Hannity & Colmes show into Hannity.

By 2018 Hannity had become one of the most-watched hosts in cable news and most-listened-to hosts in talk radio. He received Marconi Radio Awards from the National Association of Broadcasters in 2003 and 2007 and was inducted into the National Radio Hall of Fame in November 2017. He has written four New York Times best-selling books.

== Early life and education ==
Sean Patrick Hannity was born December 30, 1961 in New York City, the son of Lillian (née Flynn) and Hugh Hannity. Lillian worked as a stenographer and a corrections officer at a county jail, while Hugh was a World War II veteran and family-court officer. He was the youngest of four siblings and the only boy. Hannity's maternal and paternal grandparents immigrated to the United States from Ireland. He grew up in Franklin Square, New York on Long Island.

In his youth, Hannity worked as a paperboy delivering issues of the New York Daily News and the Long Island Daily Press. His parents were initially supporters of President John F. Kennedy, eventually growing more Republican in their views as time went on, though they resisted being overtly political at home.

Hannity attended Sacred Heart Seminary in Hempstead, New York and St. Pius X Preparatory Seminary in Uniondale, New York. He attended New York University and Adelphi University, but did not graduate from either.

== Career ==
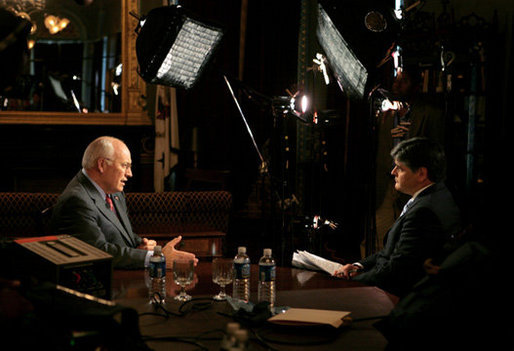
Interviewing Vice President Dick Cheney in 2006

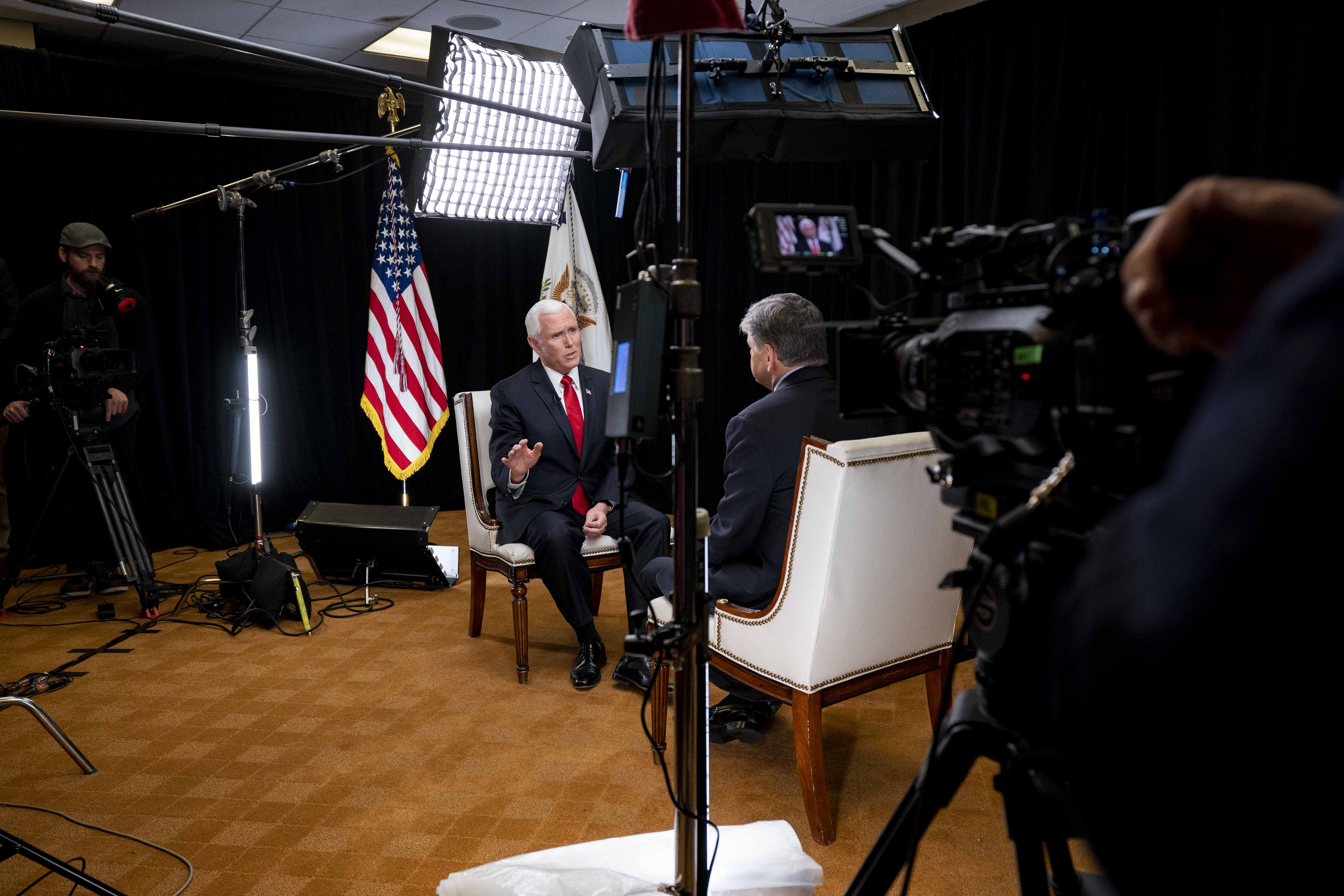
Interviewing Vice President Mike Pence in 2020

In 1982, Hannity started a house-painting business and a few years later, worked as a building contractor in Santa Barbara, California. He hosted his first talk radio show in 1989 at the volunteer college station at UC Santa Barbara, KCSB-FM, while working as a general contractor. The show aired for 40 hours of air time. Regarding his first show, he said, "I wasn't good at it. I was terrible."

=== Radio ===
Hannity's weekly show on KCSB was canceled after less than a year after a controversy. During two shows, gay and lesbian rights were discussed in what was considered to be a contentious manner. (See LGBT issues below.) The university board that governed the station later reversed its decision after a campaign conducted on Hannity's behalf by the Santa Barbara chapter of the American Civil Liberties Union argued that the station had discriminated against Hannity's First Amendment rights. When the station refused to issue Hannity a public apology and more airtime, he did not return to KCSB.

After leaving KCSB, Hannity placed an advertisement in radio publications, presenting himself as "the most talked about college radio host in America". Radio station WVNN in Athens, Alabama (part of the Huntsville media market), then hired him to be the afternoon talk show host. From Huntsville, he moved to WGST in Atlanta in 1992, filling the slot vacated by Neal Boortz, who had moved to competing station WSB. In September 1996, Fox News co-founder Roger Ailes hired the then relatively unknown Hannity to host a television program under the working title Hannity and LTBD ("liberal to be determined"). Alan Colmes was then hired to co-host and the show debuted as Hannity & Colmes.

Later that year, Hannity left WGST for New York, where WABC had him substitute for their afternoon drive time host during Christmas week. In January 1997, WABC put Hannity on the air full-time, giving him the late-night time slot. WABC then moved Hannity to the same drive-time slot he had filled temporarily a little more than a year earlier. Hannity was on WABC's afternoon time slot from January 1998.

In their 2007 book Common Ground: How to Stop the Partisan War That Is Destroying America, conservative Cal Thomas and liberal Bob Beckel describe Hannity as a leader of the pack among broadcasting political polarizers, which following James Q. Wilson they define as those who have "an intense commitment to a candidate, a culture, or an ideology that sets people in one group definitively apart from people in another, rival group". The WABC slot continued until the end of 2013. Since January 2014, Hannity has hosted the 3:00–6:00 p.m. time slot on WOR in New York City.

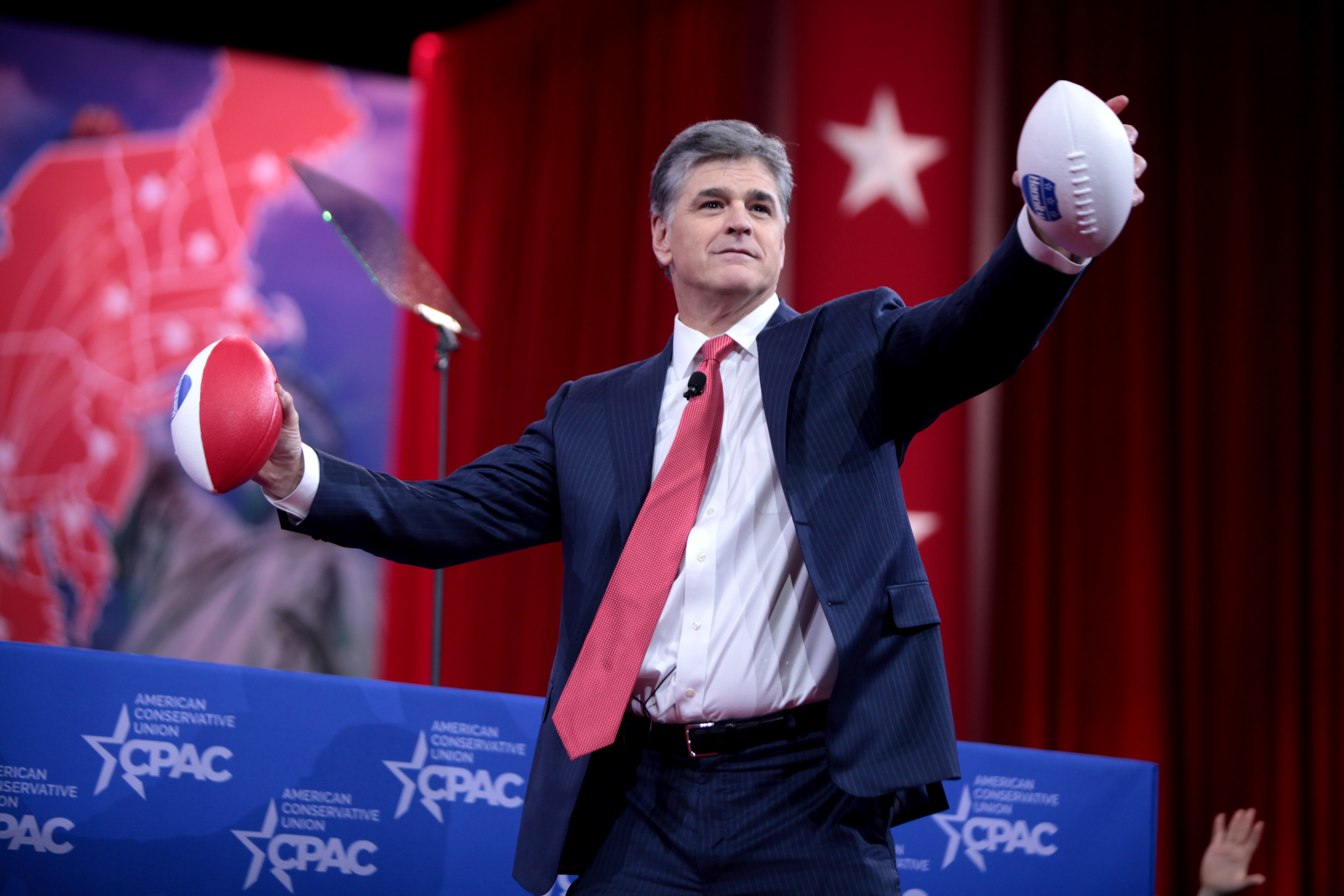
Speaking at the 2015 Conservative Political Action Conference in February 2015

Hannity's radio program is a conservative political talk show that features Hannity's opinions and ideology related to current issues and politicians. The Sean Hannity Show began national syndication on September 10, 2001, on more than five hundred stations nationwide. In 2004, Hannity signed a $25 million five-year contract extension with ABC Radio (now Citadel Media) to continue the show until 2009. The program was made available via Armed Forces Radio Network in 2006. In June 2007, ABC Radio was sold to Citadel Communications and in the summer of 2008, Hannity was signed for a $100 million five-year contract. As of March 2018, the program is heard by more than 13.5 million listeners a week. Hannity was ranked No. 2 in Talkers Magazine's 2017 Heavy Hundred and was listed as No. 72 on Forbes' "Celebrity 100" list in 2013.

In January 2007, Clear Channel Communications signed a groupwide three-year extension with Hannity on more than eighty stations. The largest stations in the group deal included KTRH Houston, KFYI Phoenix, WPGB Pittsburgh, WKRC Cincinnati, WOOD Grand Rapids, WFLA Tampa, WOAI San Antonio, WLAC Nashville, and WREC Memphis.

Hannity signed a long-term contract to remain with Premiere Networks in September 2013.

At the beginning of 2014, Hannity signed contracts to air on several Salem Communications stations including WDTK Detroit, WIND Chicago, WWRC (now WQOF) Washington, D.C., and KSKY Dallas.

=== Television ===
Hannity was a co-host of Hannity & Colmes, an American political "point-counterpoint"-style television program on the Fox News Channel featuring Hannity and Alan Colmes as co-hosts. Hannity presented the conservative point of view with Colmes providing the liberal viewpoint.

While Hannity's views are typically politically and socially conservative, he has spoken supportively about birth control, which has led to on-air clashes with pro-life guests such as Rev. Thomas Euteneuer, president of Human Life International. Hannity said if the Catholic Church were to excommunicate him over his support for contraception, he would join Jerry Falwell's Thomas Road Baptist Church.

In January 2007, Hannity began a new Sunday night television show on Fox News, Hannity's America.

In November 2008, Colmes announced his departure from Hannity & Colmes. After the show's final broadcast on January 9, 2009, Hannity took over the time slot with his own new show, Hannity, which has a format similar to Hannity's America.

=== Freedom Concerts ===
From 2003 until 2010, Hannity hosted country music-themed "Freedom Concerts" to raise money for charity. In 2010, conservative blogger Debbie Schlussel wrote that only a small percentage of the money raised by the concerts goes to the target charity, Freedom Alliance. The Citizens for Responsibility and Ethics in Washington (CREW) filed complaints with the Federal Trade Commission (FTC) and the Internal Revenue Service (IRS), also in 2010. The FTC complaint alleges that Hannity was "falsely promoting that all concert proceeds would be donated to a scholarship fund for the children of those killed or wounded in war". The complaint filed with the IRS claims that Freedom Alliance has violated its 501(c)(3) charity status. The concerts stopped around the same year.

=== Other activities ===
Hannity has had cameo appearances in film and television, having a brief voiceover in The Siege as an unseen reporter, and appearing in Atlas Shrugged: Part II and the second season of House of Cards as himself. He executive produced and appeared in the 2017 film Let There Be Light, which also stars Kevin Sorbo.

As of April 2018, Hannity owned at least 877 residential properties, which were bought for nearly $89 million. He purchased some of the homes with the help of loans from the U.S. Department of Housing and Urban Development and most are in working-class neighborhoods. His property managers have taken an aggressive management approach with a much higher than average eviction rate. The Washington Post reported that his property management team has used eviction proceedings both to remove tenants and to generate revenue. His property managers have claimed that Hannity has no active role in the management of the more than 1,000 properties he has a stake in.

In February 2026, Hannity started the interview-format podcast "Hang Out with Sean Hannity", which releases twice a week.

== Views ==
=== Candidacy of Donald Trump ===
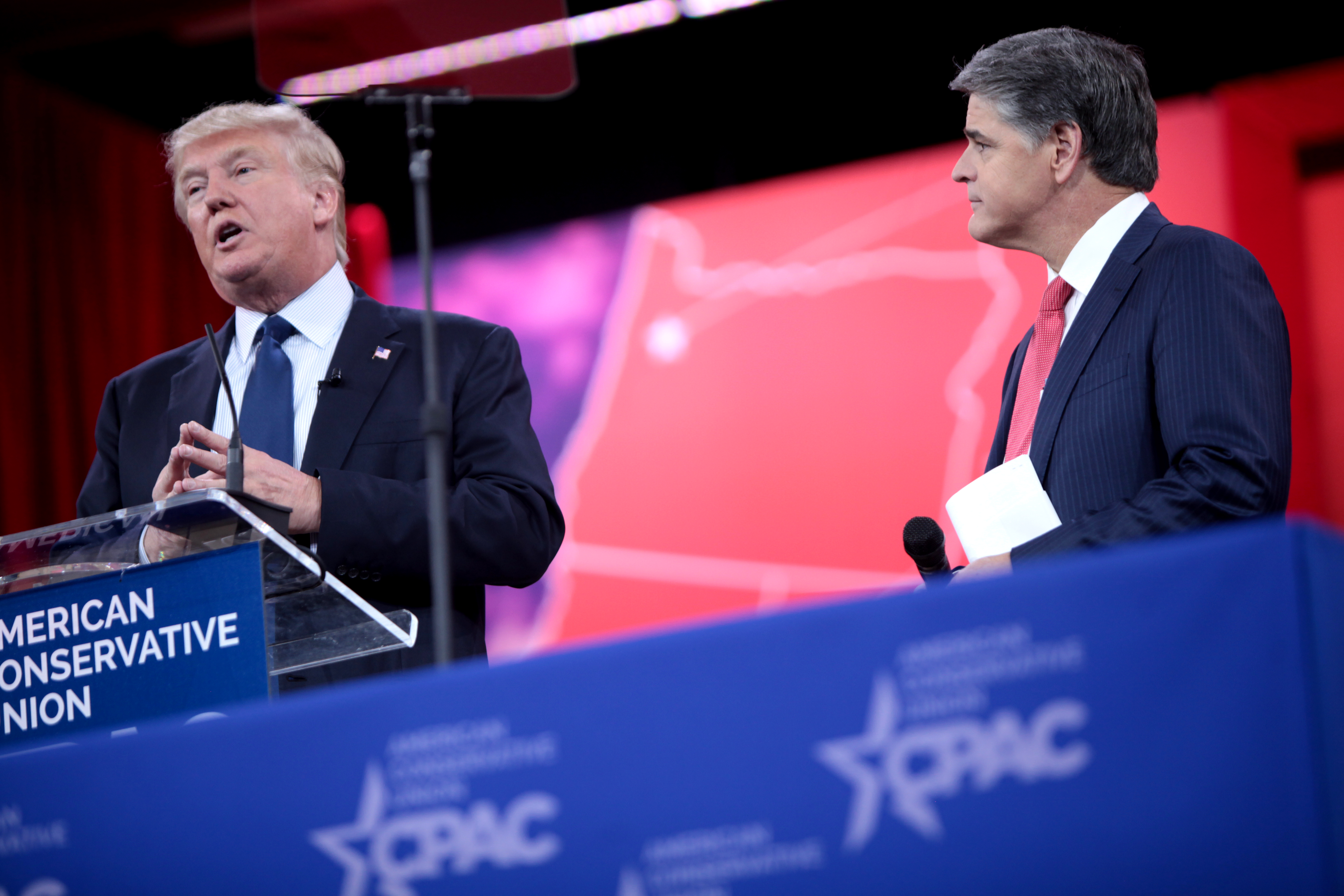
Hannity with Donald Trump in 2015

Hannity is known for his pro-Trump coverage. According to The Washington Post, "Hannity's comeback coincided with his early, eager embrace of his fellow New Yorker ... Trump attacked the Gold Star father, and Hannity stood by him. Trump went after a federal judge of Mexican descent, and Hannity backed him. After the Access Hollywood tape emerged of Trump making lewd comments about inappropriate sexual behaviour towards women, Hannity continued to defend him: 'King David had 500 concubines, for crying out loud.'" After the inauguration, the first interview the new president gave to a cable news channel was conducted by Hannity. Hannity additionally defended the Trump administration's false claim that Trump's inauguration crowd was the biggest ever.

Hannity has been criticized as being overly favorable to the candidacy of Trump and granting him more airtime than other presidential candidates during the 2016 primaries. Hannity, for instance, let Trump promote the false claim that Rafael Cruz, father of Trump's rival presidential candidate Ted Cruz, was involved in the John F. Kennedy assassination. He admitted to favoring Republican candidates, though without indicating a preference for Donald Trump over Ted Cruz. According to Dylan Byers of CNN, Hannity during interviews "frequently cites areas where he agrees with Trump, or where he thinks Trump was right about something, then asks him to expand on it", and "often ignores or defends Trump from criticism".

Tensions between Cruz and Hannity appeared to reach a boiling point during a contentious April 2016 radio interview, during which Cruz implied Hannity was a "hardcore Donald Trump supporter" and Hannity responded by accusing Cruz of "throw[ing] this in my face" every time he asked a "legitimate question". Jim Rutenberg commented in August 2016 that Hannity is "not only Mr. Trump's biggest media booster; he also veers into the role of adviser," citing sources who said Hannity spent months offering suggestions to Trump and his campaign on strategy and messaging. Hannity responded to the report by saying, "I'm not hiding the fact that I want Donald Trump to be the next President of the United States. ... I never claimed to be a journalist." (In an article published in December 2017, Hannity said "I'm a journalist. But I'm an advocacy journalist, or an opinion journalist.") Hannity also appeared in a 2016 Trump campaign ad. Hannity has feuded with several conservatives who oppose Trump, including National Review's Jonah Goldberg, Wall Street Journal foreign affairs columnist Bret Stephens, and National Review editor Rich Lowry.

=== Trump and associates relationships ===
Hannity developed a close relationship with Trump during the election and became even closer during his presidency. The two men spoke on the phone multiple times a week, discussing Hannity's weekday show, the special counsel investigation, even evaluating White House staff. Hannity shares, The Economist asserts, "Mr. Trump's love of conspiracy theories and hatred of snooty elites". They speak so often that one Trump adviser has said Hannity "basically has a desk in the place". On the air, Hannity echoes Trump's attacks on the media and Special Counsel investigation into Russian interference in the 2016 United States elections. Trump sometimes quotes Hannity to others or promotes the show to his Twitter followers. Hannity has encouraged Trump to shut down the government to get funding for a border wall, as well as his declaration of a national emergency over the US–Mexico border.

Hannity stirred controversy in April 2018 when it was revealed that he shared a lawyer, Michael Cohen, with Trump. In a breach of journalistic ethics, Hannity had failed to disclose that Cohen was his lawyer while at the same time taking to the Fox airwaves to defend Cohen and criticize those who investigated him.

On April 9, 2018, federal agents from the U.S. Attorney's office served a search warrant on the office and residence of Michael Cohen, Trump's personal attorney. On the air, Hannity defended Cohen and criticized the federal action, calling it "highly questionable" and "an unprecedented abuse of power". On April 16, 2018, in a court hearing, Cohen's lawyers told the judge that Cohen had ten clients in 2017–2018 but did "traditional legal tasks" for only three, including Trump. The federal judge ordered the revelation of the third client, whom Cohen's lawyers named as Hannity. Although Hannity has covered Cohen on his show, he did not disclose that he had consulted with Cohen.

Fox News released a statement on April 16, 2018, attributed to Hannity: "Michael Cohen has never represented me in any matter. I never retained him, received an invoice, or paid legal fees. I have occasionally had brief discussions with him about legal questions about which I wanted his input and perspective. I assumed those conversations were confidential, but to be absolutely clear they never involved any matter between me and a third party." Also, NBC News quoted Hannity as saying: "We definitely had attorney–client privilege because I asked him for that," while Hannity said on his radio show that he "might have handed him ten bucks" for the attorney-client privilege. Lastly, Hannity tweeted that his discussions with Cohen were "almost exclusively" about real estate.

In June 2019, Hannity expressed outrage at Speaker of the House Nancy Pelosi's comment that she would like to see Trump "in prison". Hannity declared: "Based on no actual crimes, she wants a political opponent locked up in prison? That happens in banana republics – beyond despicable behavior." Aaron Rupar of Vox criticized Hannity for "obvious hypocrisy", noting that Hannity himself had said in January 2018 regarding Hillary Clinton: "I think Hillary should be in jail. Lock her up." Aaron Blake of The Washington Post described Hannity's comment as "a pretty obvious bit of gaslighting", noting Hannity's loyalty to Trump, whose campaign rallies have featured chants of "Lock her up", and also Hannity's comments that Trump was free to investigate Clinton.

=== 2016 election and Seth Rich ===
During the 2016 presidential election, Hannity periodically promoted conspiracy theories regarding Hillary Clinton and the Democratic Party. Hannity repeatedly claimed that Clinton had very serious medical problems and that the media was covering them up. He misrepresented photos of Clinton to give the impression that she had secret medical problems. He shared a photo from the fake news site Gateway Pundit and falsely claimed that it showed her Secret Service agent holding a diazepam pen intended to treat seizures, when he in fact was holding a small flashlight. He booked doctors on his show to discuss Clinton's health; although these people had never personally examined Clinton, they made alarmist statements about her state of health which turned out to be false. At one point, Hannity promoted an unsubstantiated report that Clinton had been drunk at a rally; at another point, he suggested that Clinton was drunk and that her campaign needed to "sober her up".

Although Hannity said he believed President Obama was born in the U.S., to answer queries on Obama's citizenship, he repeatedly called on Obama to release his birth certificate. Hannity described the circumstances regarding Obama's birth certificate as "odd". Hannity also defended and promoted those who questioned Obama's citizenship of the U.S., such as Donald Trump. Hannity invited Trump to his show while Trump was a leader in the birther movement; during an interview with Hannity, Trump said Obama "could have easily have come from Kenya, or someplace". Hannity said in response, "The issue could go away in a minute. Just show the certificate." Even after Obama produced his birth certificate in 2008, certified by the state of Hawaii, Hannity kept calling on Obama to release his birth certificate, asking why did he not "just produce it and we move on?" In October 2016, Hannity offered to purchase a one-way ticket to Kenya for Obama.

In May 2017, Hannity became a prominent promoter of the conspiracy theory that Hillary Clinton and the Democratic Party had a DNC staffer killed. Shortly afterward, he faced backlash from news sources across the political spectrum and lost several advertisers, including Crowne Plaza Hotels, Cars.com, Leesa Mattress, USAA, Peloton and Casper Sleep deciding to pull their marketing from his program on Fox News. However, USAA decided to return to the show shortly after following a negative outcry against its decision to pull out. Conservative magazine National Review compared the story to a flat earth video, called it a "disgrace" that Hannity and other conspiracy theorists were hyping the story, and called for them to stop.

In March 2018, Seth Rich's parents filed a lawsuit against Fox News for pushing conspiracy theories about their son's death. The suit alleges that the network "intentionally exploited" the tragedy for political purposes. On October 12, 2020, Fox News agreed to pay millions of dollars to the Rich family.

Hannity came under criticism during the 2016 presidential election for false claims about election rigging during interviews. Hannity responded to this by citing Mitt Romney's failure in the 2012 United States presidential election to obtain any votes in 59 of 1,687 Philadelphia voting districts as proof of election rigging. However, FactCheck.org and PolitiFact found that it was not unusual at all for this to occur, as those electoral districts are heavily African-American. Philadelphia elections inspector Ryan Godfrey also refuted Hannity's claim.

=== 2020 election ===
After the 2020 election, Hannity amplified false claims of election fraud, including by hosting former Trump lawyer Sidney Powell on his Fox News show, where Powell made unsubstantiated allegations on the topic. The House Select Committee on the January 6 Attack investigated what Hannity may have known in advance. The committee discovered that, on December 31, 2020, Hannity texted White House chief of staff Mark Meadows, saying, "I do NOT see January 6 happening the way he [Trump] is being told." In December 2020, Hannity called for Trump's false claims of voter fraud to be investigated by a special prosecutor, despite no credible evidence of such. The Washington Post reported in May 2022 that Hannity participated in a conference call days after the 2020 presidential election that focused on strategies for challenging the legitimacy of the vote. Other participants on the call included senator Lindsey Graham, Trump personal attorney Jay Sekulow, Oracle Corporation founder Larry Ellison and James Bopp, an attorney for True the Vote.

Fox News was sued for defamation in 2021 by Dominion Voting Systems, after Hannity and other network hosts and their guests promoted false claims the company's voting machines had been rigged against Donald Trump in the 2020 presidential election. Shortly after the election, Hannity hosted Trump attorney Sidney Powell, who made such assertions, but Hannity said in a sworn deposition for the Dominion case, "I did not believe it for one second."

=== Deep State ===
Hannity has advocated the "deep state" conspiracy theory. It proposes a government officials network is working to hinder the Trump administration. He has described the deep state as a "Shadow Government" and "Deep state swamp of Obama holdovers and DC lifers". In March 2017, he called for a "purge" of Obama-era bureaucrats and appointees in government. In an op-ed for The Wall Street Journal, conservative columnist Bret Stephens disputed Hannity's deep state allegations, saying they were an example of the "paranoid style in politics". Later that month, Hannity said NBC News was part of the deep state. In May 2017, he reiterated that deep state/intelligence operatives were trying to destroy the Trump presidency.

=== 2012 Benghazi attack ===
Analysis of Fox News coverage published by Media Matters in 2014 found that Hannity was a major proponent of alleged scandals involving the Obama administration and then-Secretary of State Hillary Clinton related to the 2012 Benghazi attack. Six investigations by Republican-controlled House committees found no evidence of scandal.

=== WikiLeaks ===
In 2010, Hannity said WikiLeaks founder Julian Assange was waging a "war" on the United States, and that WikiLeaks put American lives in "jeopardy" and "danger" around the world. He also criticized the Obama administration for failing to apprehend Assange. In 2016, after WikiLeaks published leaked emails from the Democratic National Committee, Hannity praised Assange for showing "how corrupt, dishonest and phony our government is". He told Assange in a September 2016 interview, "I do hope you get free one day. I wish you the best." The following month, Hannity claimed that WikiLeaks has revealed "everything that conspiracy theorists have said over the years" about Hillary Clinton is true.

In February 2017, Hannity retweeted a WikiLeaks tweet linking to an article by the conspiracy website Gateway Pundit, claiming that John McCain was a "globalist war criminal". McCain's spokeswoman called Hannity out on it, asking him to "correct the record". Hannity later deleted the tweet. In May 2017, Hannity made an offer to Assange to guest host his Fox News TV show.

=== FBI, DOJ, special counsel ===
During President Trump's administration, Hannity has repeatedly been highly critical of the FBI, DOJ, Special Counsel Robert Mueller, and others investigating Russian interference in the 2016 election. According to a review by Media Matters of all transcripts from the 254 episodes of Hannity's show from Mueller's appointment (May 17, 2017) to May 16, 2018, Hannity had 487 segments substantially devoted to Mueller (approximately two per episode), opened his program with Mueller 152 times (approximately three times per week), and the content of his show was highly critical of the probe and the media's coverage of the probe. He has called the Russia inquiry a "witch hunt", an "utter disgrace", and "a direct threat to you, the American people, and our American republic". Hannity has expressed skepticism of the U.S. intelligence community's view that Russia hacked the Democratic National Convention's emails during the 2016 election and has promoted various conspiracy theories. In March 2017 he publicized a theory, first proposed at the WikiLeaks Twitter account, that the CIA could have done the hacking while making it look like Russia did it. In August he suggested that Seth Rich may have been the leaker. Hannity falsely claimed fewer people voted for Trump in the 2016 election because they heard about the "pee tape" rumor, which he called "election interference", even though it was not public knowledge until 63 days after the election.

Hannity has described the Mueller investigation into Russian interference in the 2016 election, as well as James Comey's tenure as FBI Director, as "one giant incestuous circle of corruption". In April 2018, Hannity ran a segment where he claimed there were "criminal" connections between Bill and Hillary Clinton, Mueller, and Comey. Hannity asserted that there were three connected "Deep State crime families" actively "trying to take down the president". A guest on the segment, attorney Joseph diGenova, called Mueller's team "legal terrorists" and referred to Comey as a "dirty cop". In March 2018, Hannity attacked Special Counsel Robert Mueller, saying his career was "anything but impeccable". Hannity said Mueller was friends with former FBI Director James Comey and former Deputy Attorney General Rod Rosenstein, and that he "cannot be expected to honestly investigate scandals that his friends are directly involved in". He said these individuals were involved in "one massive, huge, deep-state conflict of interest after another. Now they're protecting themselves. They're trying to preserve their own power." Mueller and Comey are professional acquaintances but not known to be friends, while Trump attorney general Bill Barr said in 2019 that he and Mueller had been friends for thirty years.

On November 4, 2018, Trump's website, DonaldJTrump.com, announced in a press release that Hannity would make a "special guest appearance" with Trump at a midterm campaign rally the following night in Cape Girardeau, Missouri. The following morning, Hannity tweeted "To be clear, I will not be on stage campaigning with the President." Hannity nevertheless spoke at Trump's lectern on stage at the rally, immediately mocking the "fake news" at the back of the auditorium, Fox News reporters among them. Several Fox News employees expressed outrage at Hannity's actions, with one stating, "a new line was crossed". Hannity later asserted that his action was not pre-planned, and Fox News stated it "does not condone any talent participating in campaign events". Fox News host Jeanine Pirro also appeared on stage with Trump at the rally. The Trump press release was later removed from Trump's website.

=== Sexual harassment ===
In 2016, Hannity vociferously defended Roger Ailes when he was accused by multiple women of sexual harassment. In May 2017, Hannity paid a tribute to Ailes after he died. Hannity called him "a second father" and said to Ailes' "enemies" that he was "preparing to kick your a** in the next life".

In April 2017, Hannity came to the defense of Fox News co-president Bill Shine after it was reported that Shine's job was at risk. At least four lawsuits alleged that Shine had ignored, enabled or concealed Ailes' alleged sexual harassment.

In September 2017, several months after Bill O'Reilly was fired from Fox News in the wake of a number of women's alleging that he had sexually harassed them, Hannity hosted O'Reilly on his show. Some Fox News employees criticized the decision. In the interview, O'Reilly attacked liberal media watchdog groups and said he should have fought harder when those groups targeted his advertisers. According to CNN, during the interview, Hannity found kinship with O'Reilly as he appeared "to feel that he and O'Reilly have both become victims of liberals looking to silence them".

Hannity came under criticism in October 2017 when he attacked Democrats after it became known that a large number of women had accused Harvey Weinstein, the Hollywood producer and donor to Democratic causes, of sexual harassment. Critics noted that Hannity had weeks earlier defended and hosted his coworker Bill O'Reilly who was fired following a number of sexual harassment allegations.

=== LGBT rights ===
In the radio show for KCSB, which was the subject of controversy in 1989, Hannity made anti-gay comments. He called AIDS a "gay disease" and said the media was hiding salient information from the public. Two editions featured anti-gay activist Gene Antonio, a Lutheran minister, discussing his book The AIDS Coverup: The Real and Alarming Facts about AIDS. In the book, Antonio claims that AIDS can be spread by people sneezing in close proximity to each other. Hannity encouraged Antonio when he said that AIDS spread when gay men consumed each other's feces, said that homosexuality was a "lower form of behavior", compared homosexual sex to "playing in a sewer" and gay people of being "filled with hatred and bigotry". When a lesbian, another broadcaster at the station, called into the show, Hannity said "I feel sorry for your child." Hannity was quoted at the time as having said "anyone listening to this show that believes homosexuality is a normal lifestyle has been brainwashed." The ACLU opposed his firing and petitioned the station to reverse their decision. Hannity demanded a formal apology and double the airtime. While the station did offer to allow Hannity to return, they would not meet Hannity's additional demands and he declined to return.

In 2017, Hannity said he regretted the comments and that they were "ignorant and embarrassing".

=== Immigration ===
Hannity opposed amnesty for undocumented immigrants; however, in 2012 he said he had evolved on the issue and favored a "pathway to citizenship". Later, he opposed that idea. By 2018, he was described as an immigration hardliner by CNN, The Washington Post, and New York magazine. In August 2018, Trump suggested that he might shut down the government to force Congress to fund his border wall, boasting that Hannity agreed with the action.

=== Religion ===
Hannity has warned of Sharia law coming to the United States. Hannity opposed the building of Park51, a mosque two blocks from the World Trade Center site. Hannity promoted the idea of "Islamic training camps right here in America", which were based on an unsubstantiated "documentary" by the Christian Action Network. In 2006, Hannity was critical of Keith Ellison, the first Muslim elected to U.S. Congress, being sworn into office with an oath on a Quran. Hannity equated the Quran with Mein Kampf, asking a guest on his show whether he would have allowed Ellison "to choose, you know, Hitler's Mein Kampf, which is the Nazi bible?"

=== Climate change ===
Hannity rejects the scientific consensus on climate change. In 2001, he described it as "phony science from the left". In 2004, he falsely claimed that scientists couldn't agree on whether global warming was "scientific fact or fiction". In 2010, Hannity falsely stated that so-called "Climategate" – the leaking of e-mails written by climate scientists that, according to climate change deniers, demonstrated scientific misconduct, but which all subsequent inquiries found to show no evidence of misconduct or wrongdoing – was a scandal that "exposed global warming as a myth cooked up by alarmists". Hannity frequently invites critics of climate science onto his shows.

=== Affordable Care Act ===
Hannity promoted the falsehood that the Affordable Care Act would create so-called "death panels". According to a study by Dartmouth College political scientist Brendan Nyhan, Hannity's show, along with the Laura Ingraham Show, were the first major conservative media personalities to latch onto the false claim of Betsy McCaughey, a former lieutenant governor of New York, that the Affordable Care Act contained death panels. When Sarah Palin stirred controversy by promoting the death panels myth, and argued her case in a Facebook post, Hannity defended her and said, "I agree with everything that she wrote." Hannity also claimed that he found the specific pages in the Affordable Care Act containing provisions on death panels.

A 2016 study found that Hannity promoted a number of falsehoods about the Affordable Care Act. For instance, Hannity falsely alleged several times that Democratic Senate Finance Committee Chairman Max Baucus had said Social Security could be "insolvent in two years" due to the Affordable Care Act. According to the study, Hannity, unlike other Fox News hosts such as Bill O'Reilly and Greta Van Susteren, "took a more direct approach, aggressively supporting Republicans and conservatives and attacking Democrats and liberals, endorsing the more spurious claims long after they were proven incorrect, and putting advocacy above accurate reporting, to further the network's themes opposing reform".

=== Foreign policy ===
In 2009, Hannity said of the Iraq War, "we were victorious in spite of the Democrats' efforts and attempts at preventing victory." During the 2016 election, Hannity vouched for Trump's claimed opposition to the Iraq War, "Mr. Trump and I disagreed about the Iraq war; I was for it and he was against it." In June 2019, Hannity called on Trump to "bomb the hell of out Iran" after Iran shot down a U.S. drone. After the assassination of Qasem Soleimani, Hannity opened his show by saying, "tonight the world is safer as one of the most ruthless, evil war criminals on Earth has been brought to justice."

From 2015 into 2018, Fox News broadcast extensive coverage of an alleged scandal surrounding the sale of Uranium One to Russian interests, which Hannity characterized as "one of the biggest scandals in American history". The Fox News coverage extended throughout the programming day, with particular emphasis by Hannity. The network promoted a narrative asserting that, as Secretary of State, Hillary Clinton personally approved the Uranium One sale in exchange for $145 million in bribes paid to the Clinton Foundation. Donald Trump repeated these allegations as a candidate and as president. No evidence of wrongdoing by Clinton had been found after three years of allegations, an FBI investigation, and the 2017 appointment of a Federal attorney to evaluate the investigation. In November 2017, Fox News host Shepard Smith concisely debunked the alleged scandal, including saying that Clinton did not personally approve the sale, infuriating viewers who suggested he should work for CNN or MSNBC. Hannity later called Smith "clueless", while Smith stated, "I get it, that some of our opinion programming is there strictly to be entertaining. I get that. I don't work there. I wouldn't work there."

A two-year Justice Department investigation initiated after Trump became president found no evidence to justify pursuing a criminal investigation.

=== COVID-19 pandemic ===
In February 2020, amid the spread of COVID-19 to the United States, Hannity said "many on the left are now all rooting for corona to wreak havoc in the United States. Why? To score cheap, repulsive political points." In March 2020, he characterized the virus as a "hoax", and said it "may be true" that the outbreak was a "fraud" perpetrated by the "deep state". Later in March, as the disease spread into a global pandemic and Trump declared it a national emergency, Hannity started to take the virus more seriously, denying that he had referred to it as a hoax less than a month earlier. In July 2021, on live television, Hannity encouraged the audience to consider vaccination.

== Awards, honors, and distinctions ==
Hannity has earned numerous honors, awards, and distinctions throughout his broadcasting career, including:

- Talker's Magazine Freedom of Speech Award in 2003.
- Three-time consecutive winner from 2003 to 2005 of the Radio & Records National Talk Show Host of the Year Award.
- Marconi Radio Awards from the National Association of Broadcasters in 2003 and 2007.
- Listed as No. 72 on Forbes' "Celebrity 100" in 2013 after re-upping his contract with Fox News, "extending his tenure on the cable network to 20 years."
- Inducted into the National Radio Hall of Fame in November 2017.
- Ranked No. 1 in Talkers Magazine's "Heavy Hundred" Top 100 Talk Hosts in America in 2025 (and other recent years).
  - Ranked No. 2 in Talkers Magazine's Heavy Hundred in 2017 (second only to Rush Limbaugh).
  - In 2009 listed as No. 2 (with Rush Limbaugh listed as No. 1).

== Personal life ==
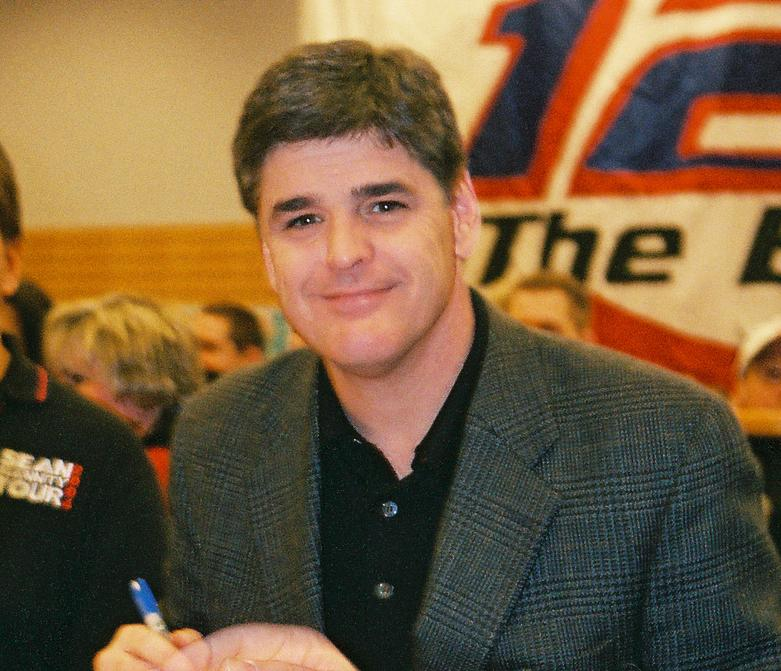
Hannity in 2004

Hannity met Jill Rhodes in 1991 when he worked at WVNN in Huntsville, Alabama and she was a political columnist for the Huntsville Times. The two married in 1993, quietly separated around 2016, and divorced in 2019 after 26 years of marriage. Hannity and Rhodes had two children together: a son, Patrick, born in 1998, and daughter, Merri, born in 2001. Both children graduated from Cold Spring Harbor High School. Patrick attended Wake Forest University, where he played tennis. Merri attends the University of Michigan, where she also plays tennis.

Hannity secretly entered a relationship with fellow Fox News presenter Ainsley Earhardt. They attended Pete Hegseth's wedding together at Trump National Golf Club Colts Neck in August 2019. During the COVID-19 pandemic, Earhardt hosted her Fox & Friends program from a remote studio in the basement of Hannity's Long Island mansion. Gabriel Sherman of Vanity Fair broke the news of their relationship in June 2020; both parties denied it at the time. On Christmas Day 2024, Hannity and Earhardt became engaged at Bethesda-by-the-Sea in Palm Beach, Florida. They were married at the same church on October 24, 2026, which was attended by members of the Trump family and several prominent conservative figures. President Trump and First Lady Melania Trump hosted and attended the couple's rehearsal dinner and pre-wedding celebrations at their Mar-a-Lago residence.

Hannity left the Catholic Church in 2019, citing "too much institutionalized corruption". However, he has said that as he has aged, his Christian faith has "gotten stronger" and that he needs and wants God in his life. He further pushed on his opposition to the Catholic Church, calling Pope Leo XIV a "Trump-hating Democrat" after the pontiff criticized the Trump administration for its attacks against the IRGC and the arrests in Venezuela of Nicolas Maduro and his wife without saying anything about the outlaw behavior of those two entities which led to US involvement.

In 2014, Hannity said he has carried a weapon for "more than half my adult life". According to Hannity, he has a brown belt in martial arts and trains four days a week in the sport. In 2018, Forbes estimated that Hannity's annual income was $36 million. In April 2021, he purchased a home for $5.3 million, located in Palm Beach, Florida. In 2024, Hannity moved from New York to Florida and began broadcasting The Sean Hannity Show and Hannity from his new home permanently.

== Books ==
- Let Freedom Ring: Winning the War of Liberty Over Liberalism, William Morrow, August 1, 2002, ISBN 978-0060514556.
- Deliver Us From Evil: Defeating Terrorism, Despotism, and Liberalism, William Morrow, February 17, 2004, ISBN 978-0060582517.
- Conservative Victory: Defeating Obama's Radical Agenda, HarperCollins, March 30, 2010, ISBN 978-0062003058.
- Live Free or Die: America (and the World) on the Brink, Threshold Editions, August 4, 2020, ISBN 978-1982149970.

Let Freedom Ring: Winning the War of Liberty over Liberalism (2002) and Deliver Us from Evil: Defeating Terrorism, Despotism, and Liberalism (2004) both reached the nonfiction New York Times bestseller list, the former topping it and the latter staying there for five weeks. Conservative Victory: Defeating Obama's Radical Agenda (2010) became Hannity's third New York Times Bestseller.

Hannity has said he is too busy to write books, that he dictated much of his first two books into a tape recorder while driving in to do his radio show.

== See also ==
- Fox News controversies
- New Yorkers in journalism
