= Janice Dickinson =

American model and television personality (born 1955)

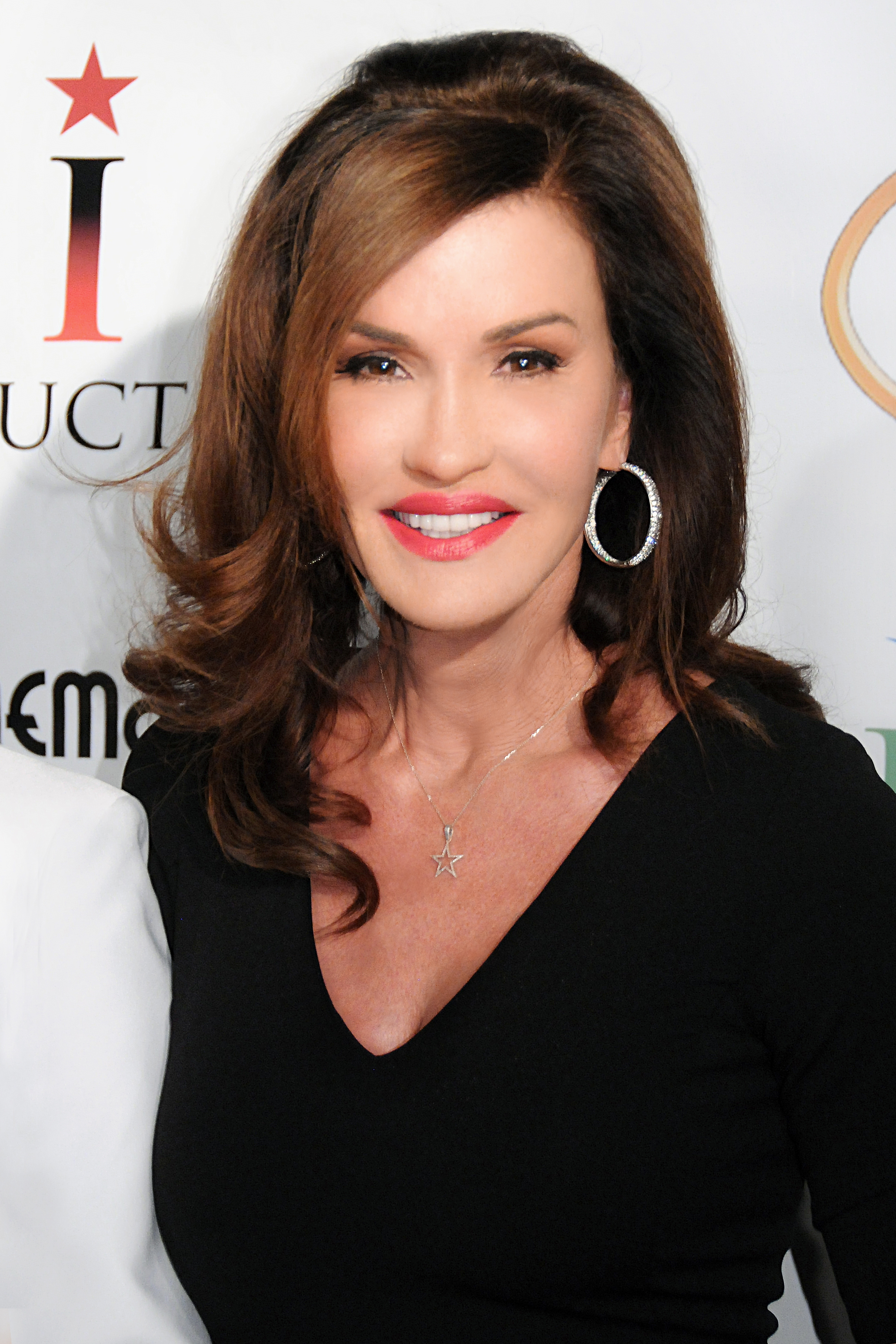
- Dickinson in 2014
- Born: February 16, 1955 (age 71); New York City, U.S.
- Occupations: Model; television personality; businesswoman
- Years active: 1969–present
- Television: America's Next Top Model; The Janice Dickinson Modeling Agency; Janice & Abbey
- Spouses: Ron Levy (m. 1977; div. 1979) Simon Fields (m. 1987; div. 1993) Alan B. Gersten (m. 1995; div. 1996) Rocky Gerner (m. 2016)
- Children: 2
- Relatives: Debbie Dickinson (sister)
- Modeling information
- Height: 5 ft 10 in (1.78 m)
- Hair color: Dark brown
- Eye color: Brown

Janice Doreen Dickinson (born February 16, 1955) is an American model, television personality, and businesswoman. One of the most successful models of the 1970s and 1980s, she also served as a judge on four cycles of the reality series America's Next Top Model (2003–2006). Dickinson opened a modeling agency in 2005 which was documented on the reality series The Janice Dickinson Modeling Agency (2006–2008).

In 2007, Dickinson was a contestant on the seventh series of the British television show I'm a Celebrity...Get Me Out of Here! where she finished as runner-up. In 2008, she starred on the reality series Janice & Abbey, alongside British model Abbey Clancy. In 2010, Dickinson appeared on the fourth series of Celebrity Rehab with Dr. Drew, and in 2015, she appeared on Celebrity Big Brother 16.

Dickinson has released three autobiographical books: No Lifeguard on Duty (2002), Everything About Me Is Fake… And I'm Perfect (2004), and Check Please! Dating, Mating, and Extricating (2006).

== Early life ==
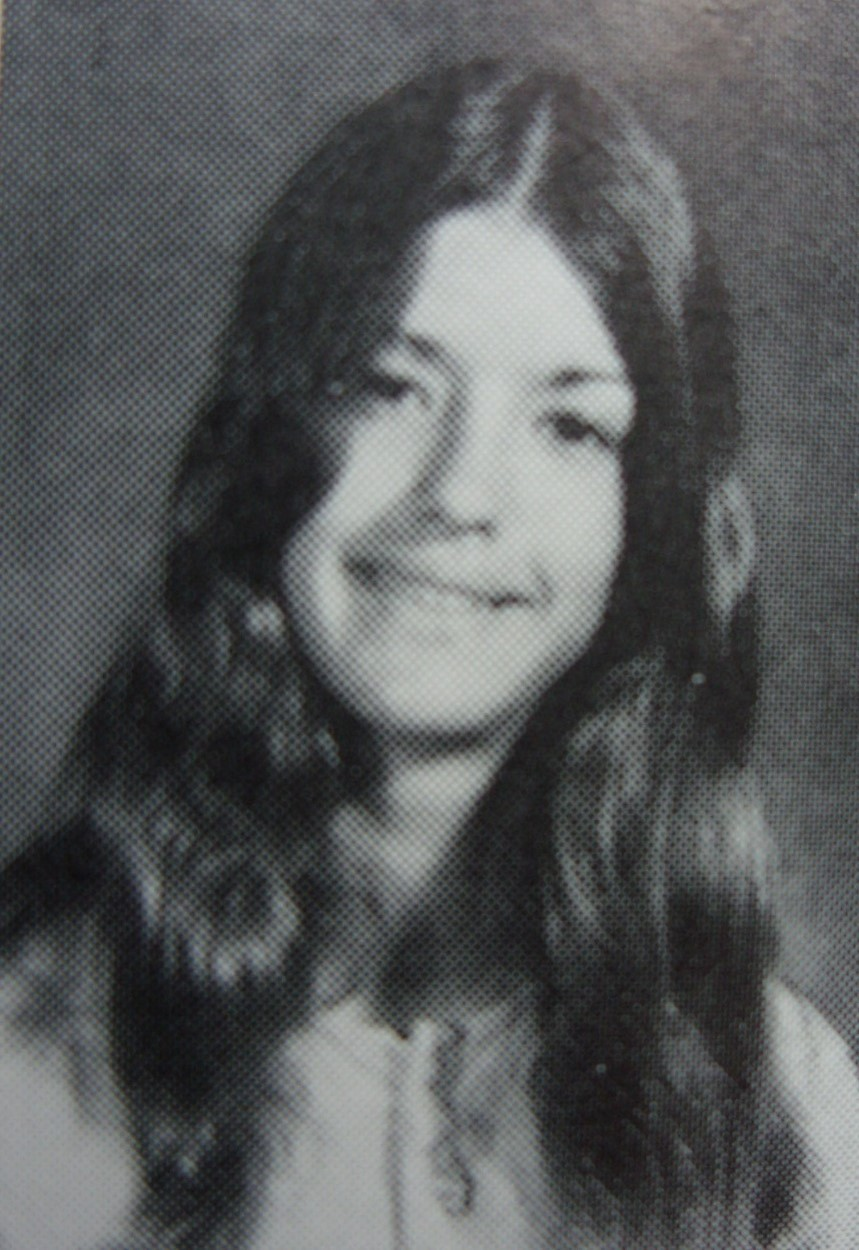
Dickinson in the 11th grade

Dickinson was the second daughter to Jennie Marie (née Pietrzykowski) and Samuel Ray Dickinson. Her mother was of Polish descent and her father was of Irish descent.

She was raised in Hollywood, Florida with her older sister, Alexis, who became a real estate agent, and her younger sister, Debbie, who also became a model.

Dickinson has been open about the emotional and physical abuse she suffered as a child and teenager, and how her father used to sexually abuse one of her sisters. Speaking of her childhood with her "rageaholic pedophile" of a father, Dickinson stated, "Because I wouldn't give in and let him have sex with me, I was verbally and physically abused on a daily basis. I was told that I looked like a boy and wouldn't amount to anything."

== Modeling career ==
In the early 1970s, Dickinson moved to New York City to pursue work as a model after winning a national competition called "Miss High Fashion Model." At a time when blue-eyed blondes dominated the fashion scene, Dickinson was turned down several times by modeling agents, including Eileen Ford, who informed Dickinson she was "much too ethnic. You'll never work."

She was discovered by the fashion photographer Jacques Silberstein when his girlfriend, actress Lorraine Bracco, mentioned she liked Dickinson's look. Wilhelmina Cooper became Dickinson's first agent. Her modeling pursuits led her to Paris, France, where her "exotic looks" secured her reputation within the European fashion industry.

She returned to New York City in 1978, and spent the next several years working steadily, earning $2,000 per day, nearly four times the standard rate. Dickinson eventually signed with Ford Models to land a major ad campaign for a new JVC camera. Dickinson, who had not forgotten Ford's initial rejection, was intent on revenge. She soon orchestrated some twenty Ford models to defect to John Casablancas's upstart Elite Model Management.

By the 1980s, Dickinson was considered a supermodel, as she "possessed the kind of name and face recognition" that the majority of women in the modeling industry strive to achieve. She appeared within and on covers of magazines including Harper's Bazaar, Cosmopolitan, Photo, Vogue, Marie Claire, and Playboy, and worked with some of fashion's best-known names, including Bill Blass, Gianni Versace, Valentino Garavani, Azzedine Alaïa, Pino Lancetti, Halston, Oscar de la Renta and Calvin Klein. She has appeared on the cover of Vogue (International editions only) 37 times. She was seen on the cover of Elle seven times in a row and has been the face of ad campaigns for brands including Revlon, Alberto VO5, Balmain, Obao, Christian Dior, Clairol, Hush Puppies, Orbit gum, Max Factor, Virginia Slims, and Cutex.

Dickinson looked for ways to sustain her relevance within the fashion industry as she aged, becoming a fashion photographer. In 2008, she launched her own jewelry line on HSN.

In 2009, Dickinson recorded a song entitled "Crazy", which was written and produced by Craig Taylor.

== Television career ==
In 1998, Dickinson worked with screenwriter Jay McInerney as a consultant for the HBO television film, Gia, which depicted the life and death of supermodel Gia Carangi.

In 2003, Dickinson returned to media attention with her position as a judge on the reality television series America's Next Top Model. She was hired after producer Tyra Banks read No Lifeguard On Duty and realized that Dickinson could offer the contestants advice on the perils of the fashion industry. As a panelist, Dickinson became known for her wit and incisive, brutally honest critiques.

Dickinson frequently quarreled with her fellow judges, particularly Kimora Lee Simmons and Nolé Marin. A recurring source of tension between Dickinson and Banks was mainly concerning plus-size models.

After four cycles, Banks fired Dickinson, replacing her with Twiggy. Dickinson was hurt by the decision. "I was just telling the truth and I was saving these girls from going out there and being told that they're too short, too fat, their skin's not good enough," she said. "I was to America's Next Top Model what Simon Cowell is to American Idol." Despite this, Dickinson made guest appearances on the following three cycles: As the photographer for a photo challenge in cycle 5, in a mentor role in cycle 6, and as the interviewee for an interview challenge in cycle 7. In 2005, Dickinson was a cast member on The Surreal Life during its fifth season. She was confronted by castmate Omarosa Manigault during a publicity photo shoot while Dickinson was posing with a prop knife. After being physically separated by Bronson Pinchot the two continued to feud throughout the series.

In 2006, Dickinson starred in her own reality show, The Janice Dickinson Modeling Agency, for the Oxygen cable-television channel. The program, which ran for four seasons, documented Dickinson launching a new career as a modeling agent. She appeared with British model Abigail Clancy in Beauty & The Best, a reality series detailing Clancy's attempt to break into the American modeling market. The show debuted in the United Kingdom on Living on May 14, 2007, and premiered in the U.S. on Oxygen on February 19, 2008.

In November 2007, Dickinson became one of the celebrities taking part in the British reality television show I'm a Celebrity…Get Me out of Here!. She set the record for most Bushtucker trials, competing ten times in a row. In the finale of the series, it was announced that Dickinson had gained second place in the competition, with Christopher Biggins coming first.

Dickinson was also a contestant for season two of the American version of I'm a Celebrity... Get Me Out of Here! which began airing in June 2009. She was eliminated from the show on June 18, 2009.

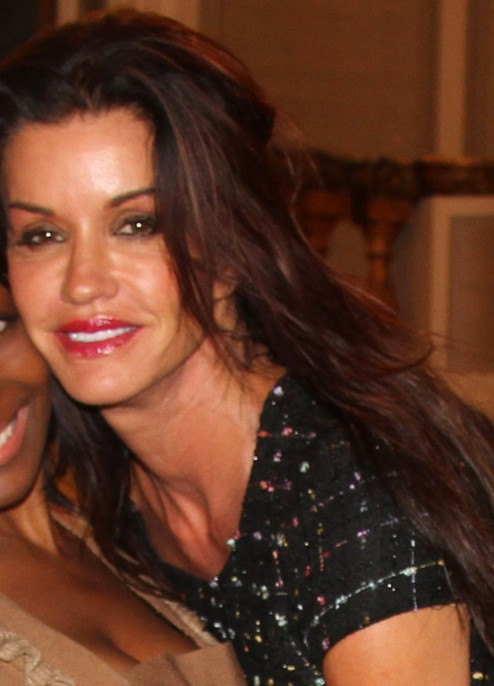
Dickinson in 2010 during London Fashion Week

In 2009, Dickinson was a guest judge on the Finnish version of the Top Model franchise. She created controversy after the claimed effects of accidentally mixing a sleeping aid with champagne caused her to fall down a flight of stairs and then berating the models. Dickinson was taken to a hospital where she was told she had no visible injuries. She later apologized to the models during the show's airing.

Other guest appearances include "Still Charmed and Kicking", an episode of Charmed. Dickinson made a cameo appearance in Darren Hayes's music video "On the Verge of Something Wonderful". In 2010, Dickinson appeared on the celebrity edition of British dinner-party contest Come Dine with Me, on which she frequently butted heads with former Page 3 Girl Samantha Fox over her glamour modeling career, and flirted with Calum Best.

Dickinson appeared in the fourth season of Celebrity Rehab with Dr. Drew, which premiered in December 2010. In 2011, she guest-starred in an episode of 90210 (titled "Project Runway").

In August 2015, Dickinson was a housemate on the sixteenth season of the British reality show, Celebrity Big Brother. She became the seventh celebrity to be evicted from the house, just two days before the final.

In 2020, Dickinson appeared on season 24 of The Bachelor.

In 2023, she appeared on I'm a Celebrity... South Africa, which acted as an all-star series for the UK version of the show, but had to withdraw from the show on day 11 after she suffered a head injury, which required her being taken to hospital. Despite this, she still finished in 10th place out of 15 contestants. In September 2025, it was reported that she had sued ITV over the fall and injuries sustained.

== Personal life ==
Dickinson has been married four times. Her former husbands are Ron Levy, Simon Fields, and Alan Gersten. She has a son, Nathan Fields, and a daughter, Savannah Rodin. Dickinson was having an affair with Sylvester Stallone when Savannah was born in 1994, and it was reported that Stallone was the father. Their relationship ended when DNA tests proved he was not the father. In her books and in interviews, she has discussed her numerous sexual relationships with male and female celebrities. She dated Jon Lovitz in 2004. In 2012, she announced she was engaged to Dr. Robert Gerner ("Rocky"), a psychiatrist whom she married in December 2016.

In November 2014, Dickinson joined a number of women accusing comedian Bill Cosby of rape, alleging that Cosby raped her in 1982. Dickinson said that she tried to write about this in her 2002 autobiography, but Cosby and his lawyers pressured her and her lawyers to remove the details.

In March 2016, it was revealed that Dickinson had been diagnosed with breast cancer.

== Books ==
Dickinson released a memoir detailing her "wild days" as a supermodel. Titled No Lifeguard on Duty: The Accidental Life of the World's First Supermodel (2002), the book was effective in introducing her to a new generation. Her 2004 follow-up memoir was Everything About Me Is Fake… And I'm Perfect, in which she describes her life in modeling; her experience with plastic surgery; and her battles with anorexia, bulimia, and alcoholism. Her next memoir, Check Please! Dating, Mating, and Extricating (2006), discusses the men in her life, and prescribes her rules for dating.

=== Bibliography ===
- Dickinson, Janice (2002). No Lifeguard on Duty – The Accidental Life of the World's First Supermodel. New York City: ReganBooks; ISBN 978-0-06-000946-5

== Filmography ==
As actress
Year	Title	Role	Notes
1983	Exposed	Model	
1988	Earth Girls Are Easy	Unknown role	Scenes cut from final release
1998	Buddy Faro	Evelyn Maynard	Episode: "Touched by an Amnesiac"
2000	Zoe, Duncan, Jack & Jane	Supermodel	Episode: "I Don't Feel So Good"
2005	Charmed	Paige #2	Episode: "Still Charmed and Kicking"
2005	Wassup Rockers	Beverly Hills Actress	Cameo appearance
2023	Barbee Rehab	Doctor Janice (Johannes)	

As herself
Year	Title	Role	Notes
2003–2006	America's Next Top Model	Judge	
2004	Rock Me Baby	Herself	Episode: "Look Who's Talking"
2005	The Surreal Life	Herself	Season 5
2005–2006	The Tyra Banks Show	Herself	10 episodes
2006	Million Dollar Listing Los Angeles	Herself	1 episode
2006–2008	The Janice Dickinson Modeling Agency	Herself	Also executive producer
2007	Janice & Abbey	Herself	Also executive producer
2007	I'm a Celebrity...Get Me Out of Here! (UK)	Participant	Series 7, runner-up
2009	I'm a Celebrity...Get Me Out of Here! (US)	Participant	Season 2, 8th place
2010	Finland’s Next Top Model	Guest judge	1 episode
2010	Come Dine with Me	Herself	Celebrity edition episode
2010	8 Out of 10 Cats	Herself	1 episode
2010	Loose Women	Herself	Guest panellist; 2 episodes
2010–2011	Celebrity Rehab with Dr. Drew	Herself	
2011	Celebrity Juice	Herself	2 episodes
2011	Britain and Ireland's Next Top Model	Guest judge	2 episodes
2012	Sweden's Next Top Model	Guest judge	
2012	RuPaul's Drag Race All Stars	Guest judge	1 episode
2014, 2016	Botched	Herself	2 episodes
2015	Celebrity Big Brother UK	Contestant	Series 16, 7th place
2015	Couples Therapy	Herself	5 episodes
2018	The Face Thailand	Guest judge	1 episode
2020	The Bachelor	Herself	1 episode
2023	I'm a Celebrity... South Africa	Participant	11 episodes (withdrew)

== See also ==
- List of people from Florida
- List of people from Brooklyn, New York
- List of women writers
- List of people in Playboy 1980–1989
