= Hating America: The New World Sport =

2004 book by John Gibson

- Author: John Gibson
- Language: English
- Subject: American politics
- Genre: non-fiction
- Publisher: ReganBooks
- Publication date: 2004
- Publication place: United States
- Pages: 304
- ISBN: 0-06-058010-0
- OCLC: 54677781
- Dewey Decimal: 327.73/009/0511 22
- LC Class: E902 .G54 2004

Hating America: The New World Sport (ISBN 0-06-058010-0) is a 2004 book by John Gibson, a Fox News pundit. The book discusses world reaction to the foreign policy of the United States after the September 11 Terrorist Attacks.

The book received mixed reviews, typically down partisan and ideological lines. Publishers Weekly said that "by lumping this reluctance under the rubric of hatred, Gibson reduces serious policy differences to emotional animus," while a Townhall.com review notes that "Gibson found countless examples of America-hatred, supporting his thesis that many in the international community would like to see the downfall of America."

In a document on Anti-Canadian sentiment in the United States for the International Journal of Canadian Studies, Trevor W. Harrison discussed a chapter in the book that touches on Anti-Americanism in Canada. Gibson writes that Canada, South Korea, and Belgium are all members of an "axis of envy."
