= Brandon Schantz =

American journalist (1980–2007)

Brandon Scott Schantz (July 26, 1980 - December 6, 2007) was a broadcaster, sports director and television producer. He was best known as an on-camera host for Movies.com and for producing music videos for the rock band Rooney. Schantz previously become the youngest local news station sports director in the history of the CBS network and its affiliates.

== Biography ==
=== Early life ===
Schantz was a native of San Francisco and graduated from San Ramon Valley High School in the East Bay neighborhood of Danville, California.

He graduated the University of Texas at Austin with a bachelor's degree in broadcast journalism in 2002. He worked as a production intern with KEYE-TV, an Austin, Texas, CBS affiliate from 2000 until 2002 while attending the University of Texas. As an undergraduate, he interned in the sports department at KXAN.

=== Career ===
Upon his graduation from college at 22, Schantz was hired as the sports director at KGWN-TV, a CBS affiliate in Cheyenne, Wyoming, making him the youngest local news station sports director in the history of the CBS network. He also appeared on camera at KGWN as a sports reporter and Sportscaster.

Schantz departed KGWN in the mid-2000s and moved to Los Angeles to pursue a career as a producer and television host. He established a production company at the age of 25 named Brandon Schantz Productions, and established a production headquarters with partners Kevin Dobski at Santa Monica Studios in Santa Monica, CA. Collectively Schantz and Dobski produced music videos, short form digital web content and live television events from 2006 and 2007, including a music video, "I Should've Been After You", for Rooney, a Southern California based rock band.

Schantz was also hired as an on-camera host and producer for Movies.com, which was acquired by the Walt Disney Company.

=== Death ===
Schantz was diagnosed with lymphoma in the Spring of 2007 and underwent surgery in October 2007. During treatment, he continued working at his production company and at Movies.com. He also made a brief appearance in the seventh episode of The Real World: Hollywood, which was filmed in 2007, and aired June 25, 2008. Schantz gave internships to three Real World cast members -- Kimberly Alexander, Nick Brown and Sarah Ralston -- who aspired to become on-air hosts. He died on December 6, 2007 at the age of 27. Brown's reaction to Schantz's death, was chronicled on-camera. Schantz was survived by his parents, Sean and Kim Schantz, his siblings, Ryan and Kaylee, and his grandparents.
