= Blackhawk Museum =

Car museum in Danville, California

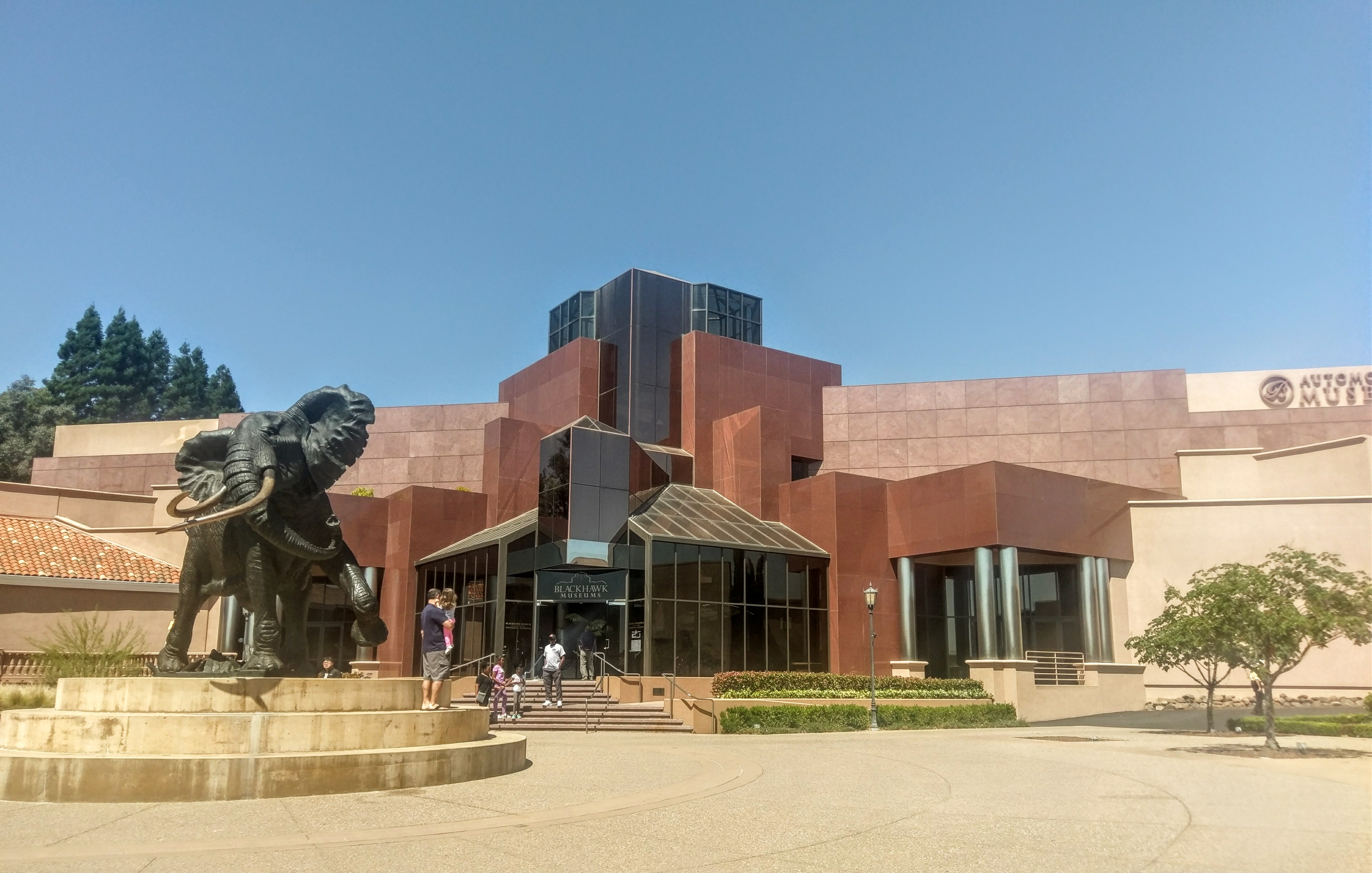
- Exterior view of the Blackhawk Museum
- Established: August 1988
- Location: Danville, California
- Coordinates: 37.801254°N 121.917555°W
- Collection size: ~90 cars
- Founders: Ken Behring & Don Williams
- Executive director: Daniel Dunn
- Directors: Joel Hodge(main); Jonathan Snyder (Operations); Lyndsay Thomas (Membership & Communications)
- Curator: Joel Hodge
- Architect: Doug Dahlin
- Employees: 144
- Website: Blakhawkmuseum.org

The Blackhawk Museum, founded in 1988, consists of five distinct galleries in a facility in Danville, California with a significant collection of classic, rare, and unique automobiles. In addition to its gallery Classic Car Collection, the museum's four other galleries are The Spirit of the Old West, Art of Africa, Into China, and World of Nature.

The museum is a subsidiary of the not-for-profit Behring Global Educational Foundation and an affiliate of the Smithsonian Institution through the Smithsonian Affiliations program. It is located within the Blackhawk Plaza shopping center but is not affiliated with the mall.

== History ==
Founded by a partnership between benefactor Ken Behring and Don Williams that began in 1982, the Blackhawk Automotive Museum first opened its doors in August 1988 (38 years ago). The museum was established to ensure that significant automotive treasures would be exhibited for public enjoyment and educational enrichment. The Hacienda-based architect Doug Dahlin is responsible for the design of the museum.

In February 2015, the Blackhawk Museum added a permanent collection of 19th-century North American artifacts called The Spirit of the Old West, showcasing both the settler and Native American stories of the European expansion into North America during the 1800s.

In January 2020, the Blackhawk Museum opened the exhibit Into China, featuring artwork, sculptures, and both original and replica artifacts related to Chinese history and culture. The exhibit includes replicas of terracotta warriors, a wooden model of the Forbidden City, and an authorized reproduction of the bronze bell set from the Tomb of Marquis Yi.

== Collections ==
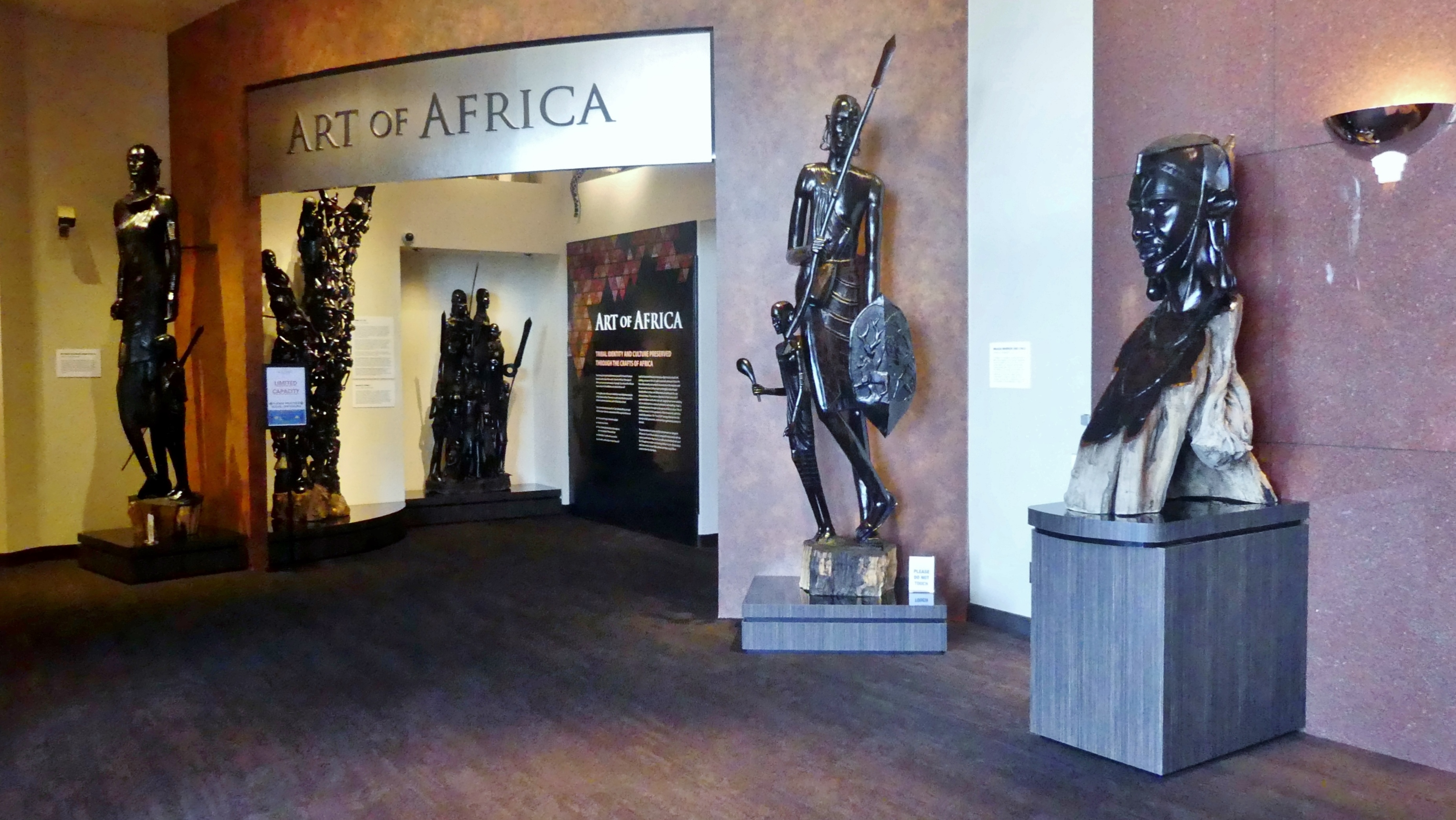
Art of Africa gallery

The museum houses about ninety classic cars. It also houses a display showcasing the work of the Wheelchair Foundation.

One of the museum's most unusual possessions is a 1924 Hispano-Suiza H6C with a body paneled with tulipwood. Over the years, the museum has also housed a 1962 John F. Kennedy limousine and a Chinese Hongqi, the first Chinese-made automobile to be imported to the United States.

The museum is a partner in organizing the local Concours d'Elegance event, which showcases some of the museum's collection among the usual entrants.

Several changing exhibitions, representative of topics in transportation, culture, and science as they relate to our society, have been hosted in the various galleries and reception areas throughout the museum. Current exhibitions include selections of American jukeboxes from the golden age of the juke box and a display of antique gas pumps. Since 2000, the Blackhawk Automotive Museum has been an affiliate of the Smithsonian Institution, and together they have partnered to bring a variety of cultural exhibitions, historical artifacts, and significant automobiles from across the US.

Since its opening, exhibits showcasing African art, Chinese history, and exotic animals have been added.

== Admission ==
Tickets for the Blackhawk Museum are non-refundable and can be purchased at the door or online. On most days the Museum is open from 10:00 am to 5:00 pm.
