= Casey Pratt =

American sports journalist and producer

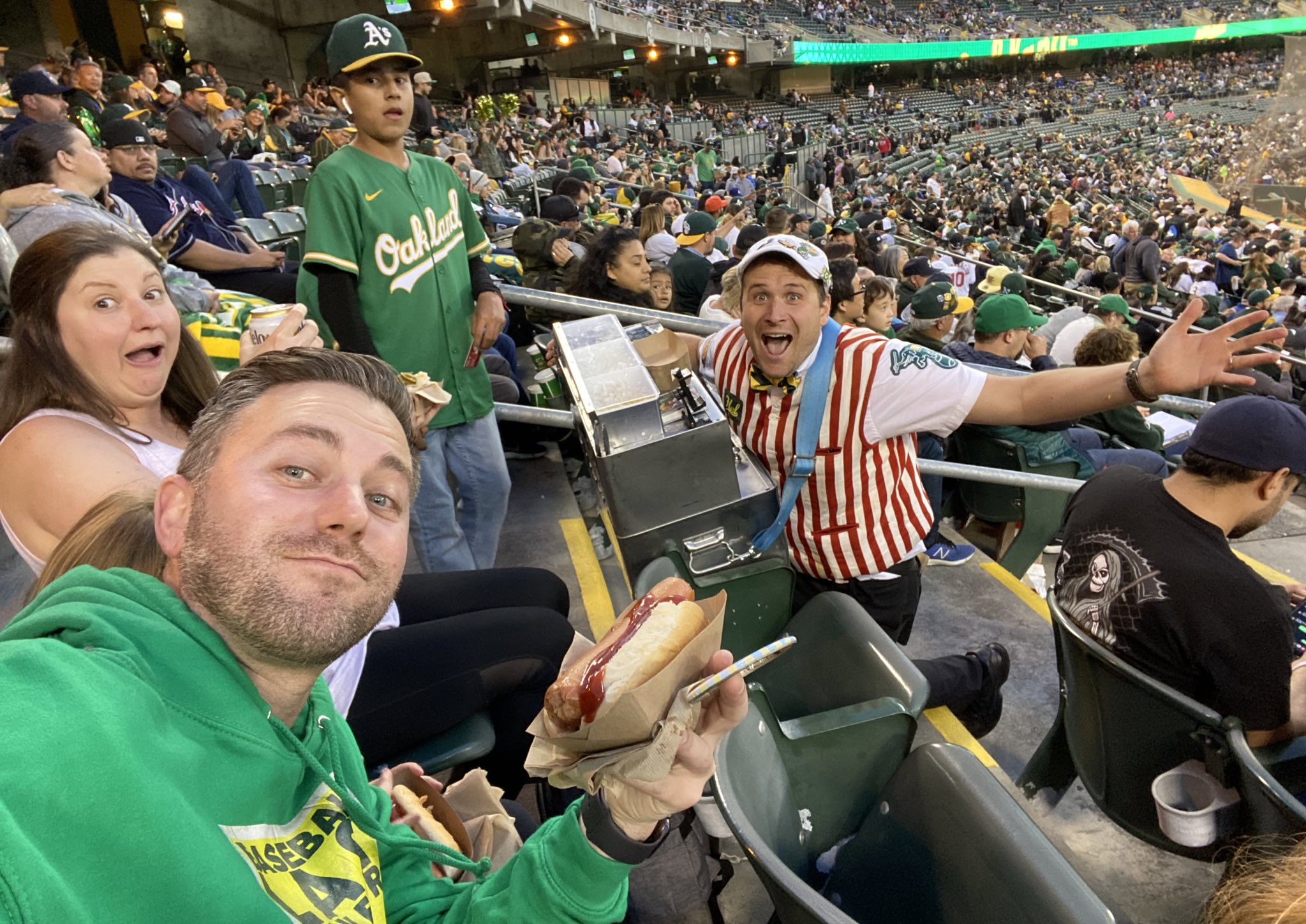
Pratt at an Oakland Athletics game buying a hot dog from Hal Gordon

Casey Pratt is a producer, senior producer, editor, and sports journalist for ABC 7; his main assignment is with the Oakland Athletics. He covers other Bay Area teams including the 49ers.

== Career ==
Pratt worked as a sports producer, news editor, and media manager at ABC 7 from 2006 to 2009 following college graduation. He later worked for Comcast Sportsnet (CSN) and appeared on shows including Chronicle Live, A's Pregame Live, and A's Postgame Live. While at CSN, he was an A's Insider and in 2010 won an area Emmy in the "Sports—Regularly scheduled daily or weekly program" category for his work on A's Final Cut. He was nominated for another area Emmy in 2013 in the "Sports-One-Time Special" category as a segment producer for Forgotten Destiny, and again in 2015 in "Sports—Feature segment" as the producer of First Pitch for Diego. He returned to ABC 7 in 2016 and in 2019 began hosting the weekly podcast With Authority alongside Larry Beil. He won a Group MVP Award in 2018 from the Disney—ABC Television Group and was the first ever ABC 7 employee to do so.

In July 2024, Pratt left his position at ABC 7 to join the administrative staff of the then-Mayor of Oakland Sheng Thao as Chief of Communications. Following Thao's recall as mayor, Pratt was hired by the independent minor league baseball team Oakland Ballers of the Pioneer League as Vice President of Communications and Fan Entertainment in January 2025.

== Education and personal life ==
Pratt was born in San Diego, California. He grew up as a 49ers fan in the San Francisco Bay Area. He graduated from San Ramon Valley High School and received his BA in journalism from San Francisco State University. He lives in Danville, California, with his wife Danielle and their daughter.
