= San Ramon Valley High School =

Public high school in California, United States

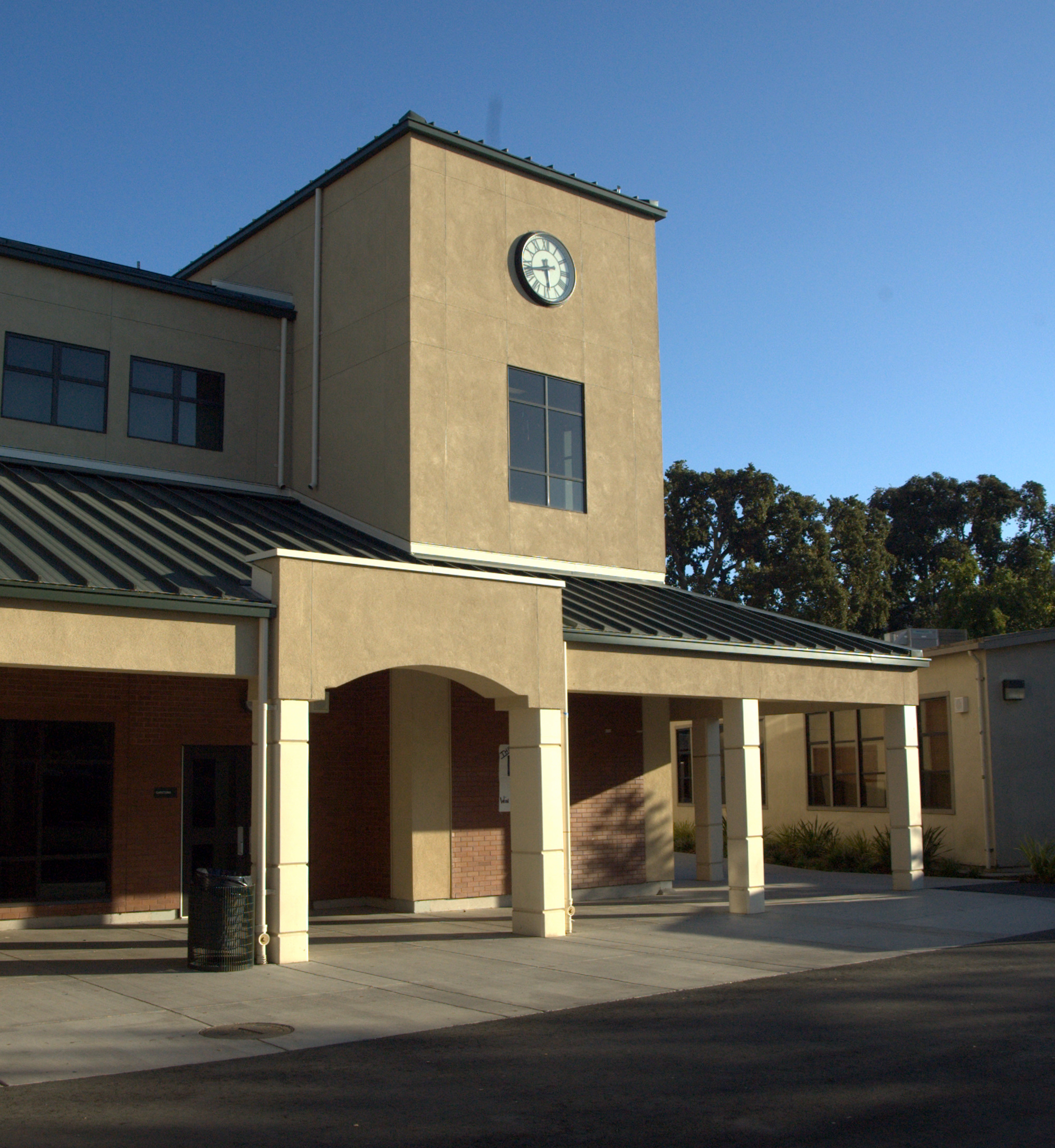
- A building at San Ramon Valley High School in 2007

Location
- 501 Danville Blvd; Danville, California 94526; United States; 37°49′34″N 122°00′21″W

Information
- Type: Public
- Established: 1910
- School district: San Ramon Valley Unified School District
- Principal: Charlie Litten
- Teaching staff: 88.23 (FTE)
- Enrollment: 2,024 (2023–2024)
- Student to teacher ratio: 22.94
- Campus: Suburban
- Colors: Green and gold
- Athletics conference: East Bay Athletic League
- Mascot: Wolf
- Website: srvhs.srvusd.net
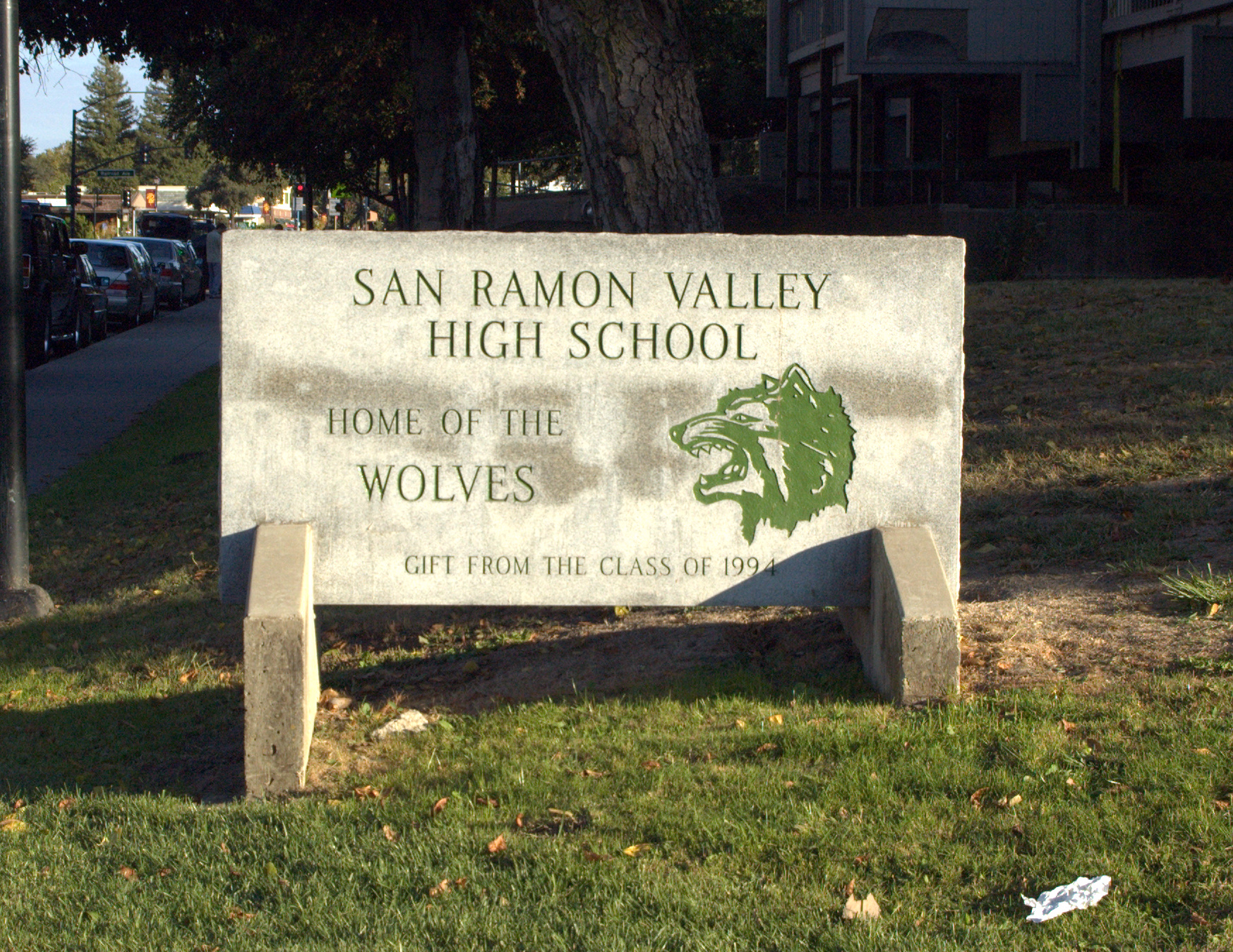
- The sign at the entrance to San Ramon Valley High School.

San Ramon Valley High School is a four-year public high school in Danville, California, United States. It is part of the San Ramon Valley Unified School District and has been recognized as both a National Blue Ribbon School and a California Distinguished School. San Ramon Valley High School is ranked 252 out of 1,536 California high schools.

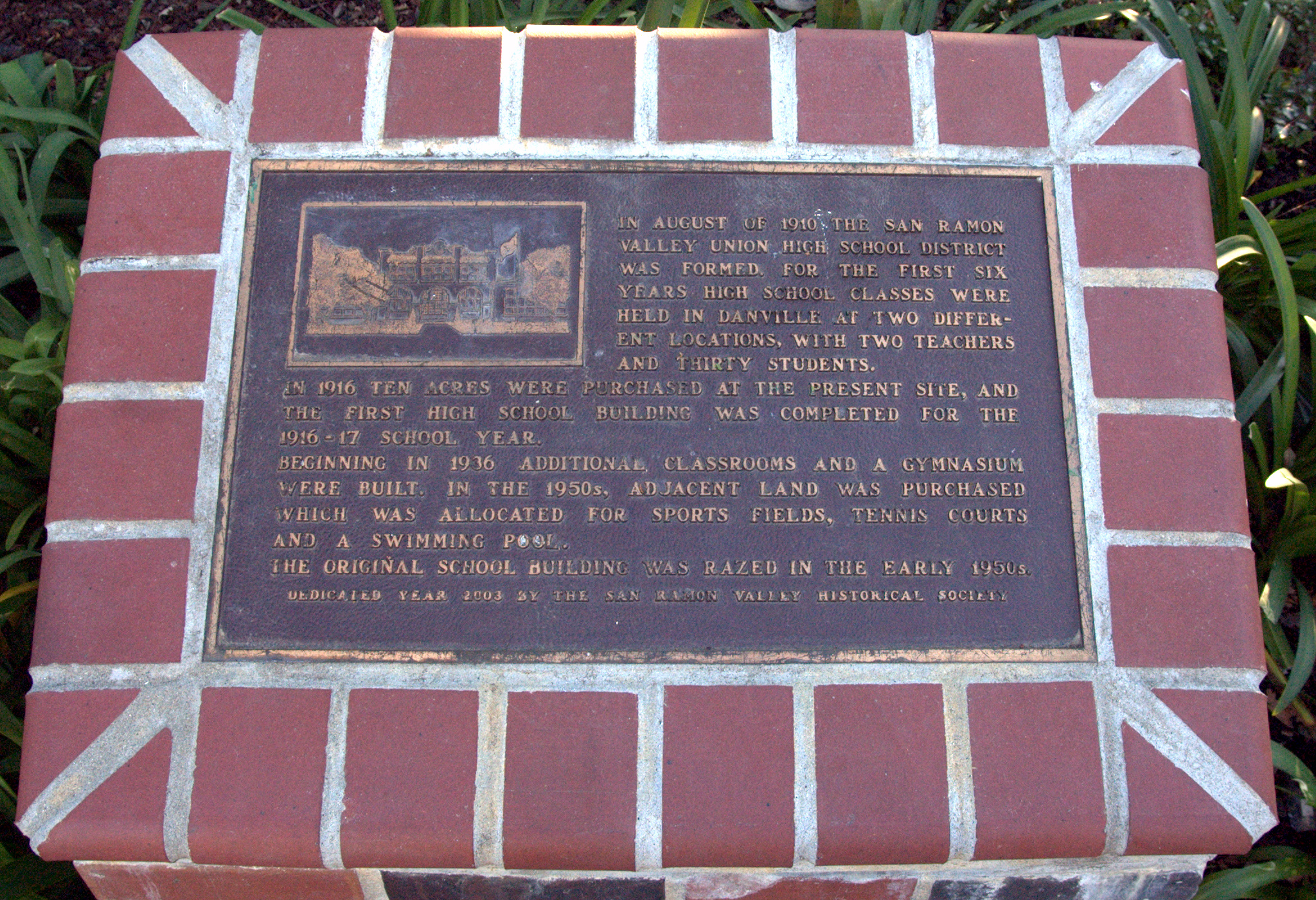
This plaque resides outside of San Ramon Valley High School and has a brief rundown of the school's early history.

== Athletics ==
San Ramon Valley High School offers 23 sports across the Fall, Winter, and Spring sports seasons. These teams compete in the East Bay Athletic League and play teams in close by cities. Their league is EBAL (East Bay Athletic League). The sports played at San Ramon Valley include:

- Baseball
- Cross Country
- Competitive Cheer
- Football
- Flag Football
- Men's/Women's Basketball
- Men's/Women's Golf
- Men's/Women's Lacrosse
- Men's/Women's Soccer
- Men's/Women's Tennis
- Men's/Women's Volleyball
- Men's/Women's Water Polo
- Softball
- Swimming and Diving
- Spirit Leading
- Track and Field
- Wrestling

== Native American remains unearthed ==
On July 8, 2009, construction workers unearthed the remains of a Bay Miwok Native American while working on the new gymnasium, temporarily halting construction. Archaeologists claim the main camp was located six miles (9.7 kilometers) away and that finding skeletal remains such a distance from the camp was unusual; however, similar remains were discovered during repairs of the nearby I-680 freeway. Following an archaeological dig, the remains of more than two dozen Native Americans were found on the site, which may have served as a mortuary complex. The remains were re-buried in the Ohlones Indian Cemetery in Fremont.

The Native American Heritage Commission designated Andrew Galvan to represent the Native American community in decisions about what to do with remains discovered beneath the school. Galvan was also the curator of Mission Dolores in San Francisco. Galvan had served as a designated descendant multiple times over the previous three decades. Galvan was appointed to oversee the removal and reburial of the remains at the school.

The Tatcan were identified as a Bay Miwok group associated with San Ramon Valley according to Galvan. The western slopes of Mt. Diablo and a large portion of present day Danville were part of their territory. Streams are where Tatcan settlements were usually located. Houses made from tule reeds are what these settlements included. Galvan also explained that burial sites were often near waterways and water sources because the ground was easier to dig.

By July 30, 2009, the archaeological investigation identified the remains of 22 individuals. At this point, one set of remains was removed, while the rest remained buried at the site. The burials were found at depths of approximately three to eight feet. Galvan estimated that the remains were between 250 and 2,000 years old. Archeologists planned to examine artifacts found near the burial site to help determine the age of the remains. As the investigation continued, Galvan expected more remains to be uncovered.

Galvan explained that each burial would be carefully exposed before its removal. Earthmoving equipment continued operating in some parts of the site, but excavation proceeded in supervised layers to check for further discoveries. District spokesman Terry Koehne said construction could continue in areas where no remains had been found. The remains were discovered on school district property, so the district was responsible for the costs of removing them. Koehne estimated those costs at approximately $25,000 in July 2009. At the time, it couldn't be determined whether the excavation would increase the gymnasium's overall construction cost.

The new gymnasium was the final major building in a seven year construction plan at San Ramon Valley High School. The project also included a technical education building, classroom buildings, an auxiliary gymnasium, and a cafeteria. The previous main gymnasium had been condemned in February 2008 after an engineer deemed the building couldn't withstand earthquake's. In September 2010, principal Joseph Ianora expected the gymnasium's construction to be complete by the end of the year. According to a February 2011 article by Jessica Lipsky, more than 49 Native American remains had been relocated for reburial.

== Demographics ==
The demographic breakdown of the 2,077 students enrolled in 2017-2018 was:

- Male - 48.9%
- Female - 51.1%
- Native American/Alaska Native - <0.1%
- Asian - 7.8%
- Black - 0.1%
- Hispanic - 9.4%
- Native Hawaiian/Pacific Islander - <0.1%
- White - 74.4%
- Multiracial - 6.7%

4.3% of the students were eligible for free or reduced lunch.

== Notable alumni ==
- John F. Baldwin Jr., U.S. Representative
- Scott Bauhs, distance runner for Adidas, NCAA Division II 5k (2008), 10k (2007) and cross country champion (2008)
- Geoffrey Blake, actor Contact, Forrest Gump
- Jeff Campitelli, percussionist, most notably as drummer for guitarist Joe Satriani
- D'Arcy Carden, comedic actress, The Good Place
- J.R. Havlan, 8-time Emmy Award winning writer for The Daily Show with Jon Stewart
- Chris Carter, former NFL wide receiver
- James Darnell, former MLB third baseman for the San Diego Padres
- Kevin Davidson, NFL player
- Autumn Durald Arkapaw, first woman to win an Academy Award for Best Cinematography
- John Gesek, NFL player for Dallas Cowboys and 2-time Super Bowl champion
- Roy Helu, former NFL and University of Nebraska running Back
- Guy Houston, former member of the California State Assembly
- Marco Jones, college football defensive end for the Texas A&M Aggies
- J. J. Koski, NFL wide receiver for Los Angeles Rams
- Bob Ladouceur, former head coach for De La Salle High School football team
- Jason Lucash, inventor and founder of Origaudio, Time's Top 50 Inventions of 2009; successful participant on ABC's show Shark Tank, and Entrepreneur's 2012 "Entrepreneur of the Year"
- Mark Madsen, former NBA player for Minnesota Timberwolves and Los Angeles Lakers; won NBA championship with Lakers and is currently the head men's basketball coach at UC Berkeley
- Bronwyn Newport, cast member on The Real Housewives of Salt Lake City
- Casey Pratt, Oakland A's journalist for ABC 7
- Omar Samhan, professional basketball player; played in NCAA Sweet 16 in 2010 for Saint Mary's College of California
- Dru Samia, NFL offensive lineman for New York Jets
- Brandon Schantz, filmmaker and television producer
- Nate Schierholtz, former MLB player for Chicago Cubs and 2010 World Series champion San Francisco Giants
- Mark Tollefsen, basketball player, 2018-19 top scorer in the Israel Basketball Premier League
- Keith Varon, singer, songwriter, producer
- Randy Winn, former MLB player for San Francisco Giants
