= Wheelchair Foundation =

Non-profit organization

Wheelchair Foundation Logo

The Wheelchair Foundation (WF) is a non-profit organization founded in June 2000 by real estate developer Ken Behring, and based in Danville, California. The foundation partners with donors (individuals, groups and companies) to provide wheelchairs to people who need them but cannot afford them, mostly in developing nations. As of September 2008, the WF network has delivered over 750,000 wheelchairs to 150 nations.

The foundation partners with various service organizations, including Rotary Clubs, the Knights of Columbus and Sister Cities International.

The WF International Board of Advisers includes a number of current and former heads of state and celebrities, including co-chairs Juan Carlos and Sophia of Spain, as well as Mikhail Gorbachev and Nelson Mandela.

Independent organizations that make up the Wheelchair Foundation mission are the Canadian Wheelchair Foundation and Wheelchair Foundation UK. WF Australia also existed as an independent entity until 2008 but is now a project of the Rotary Club of Gosford West (NSW).

Behring has commented about the importance of NGOs in the distribution of the wheelchairs:

"The NGOs are crucial in every country. I think we’re currently working with several hundred NGOs. When we were in Afghanistan, we used some people from the disability community, and the U.S. Army also helped us. We regularly give away quite a few chairs in China, working with their Disabled Federation. In Central America, for example, we work with First Ladies. The wives of the presidents usually have a foundation and they have the connections with rehabilitation hospitals. So they’ve been very, very helpful all through Central and South America in regard to helping us find appropriate recipients for the chairs."
