= Jason Lucash =

American inventor and entrepreneur

- Born: California, United States
- Education: University of California, Davis
- Occupations: inventor and entrepreneur
- Known for: Founder of Origaudio

Jason Lucash is an American inventor and entrepreneur who founded Origaudio.

== Early life ==
Lucash is a native of Danville, California and graduated from San Ramon Valley High School before receiving his bachelor's degree in Managerial Economics from the University of California, Davis.

== Career ==
Lucash gained his early work experience at JanSport and Major League Soccer, the latter where he met his current business partner Mike Szymczak. Lucash traveled extensively for both employers and saw the need to create for an eco-friendly way to listen to music on the road. It was in his travels that the idea for OrigAudio came about. His first product called “Fold n’ Play”, are foldable speakers made from recycled materials and require zero external power, making the product eco-friendly. These speakers landed Lucash a spot on Time Magazine's "Top 50 Inventions of 2009" list.

Lucash was featured in the seventh episode of the second season of ABC's show Shark Tank, where he received an investment from millionaire Robert Herjavec.

In 2012 Lucash was named to the OC Metro magazine 40 under 40 list for being one of the most innovative people in Orange County. This same year OrigAudio and Lucash again were featured on the first episode of the third season of ABC's show Shark Tank highlighting the exponential growth his company has had since first appearing on Shark Tank.

Lucash was named Entrepreneur (magazine)'s "Emerging Entrepreneur of the Year" for 2012. In 2013, Lucash was named "Young Alumnus of the Year" by his alma mater the University of California, Davis.

Lucash currently is helping grow OrigAudio's business worldwide as they now have over seventy products under the brand name and are in process of rolling out more. Lucash also travels the globe speaking at conferences, universities, and corporate events.

In September 2018, Origaudio was acquired by Hub Promotional Group based out of Braintree, Massachusetts. Financial terms of the deal were not disclosed and in addition to his current role at Origaudio, Lucash became Senior Vice President of Marketing and Product for HUB.
