= Movies.com =

Former website

- Website type: Movies
- Available in: English
- Owner: Fandango Media
- Commercial: Yes
- Registration: Available, but not required

Movies.com was a website; the URL now redirects to that of its owner, Fandango Media.

The Walt Disney Company was using Movies.com in newspaper advertisements for Disney subsidiary films as early as 1996. Disney formally launched the site as a movie based resource in 2000. In 2001, a group of five film studios announced they were forming "Movielink" to provide video on-demand services. Shortly thereafter, The Walt Disney Company and Fox News Corp. announced that Movies.com would be a joint venture to access films and other content on the internet, allowing the fledgling audience of broadband internet to download movies on demand, then estimated to be about 10 million homes in the United States. Both ventures began to be investigated by the U.S. Antitrust Division. Fox pulled out of the joint venture in April 2002, citing the potential regulatory and logistical concerns with the concept.

Fandango acquired the site from Disney in June 2008, at which time Movies.com had 1.9 million monthly unique visitors, compared to 6.3 million for Fandango.

The site was home to the award-winning webshow Statler and Waldorf: From the Balcony (2005–06), a bi-weekly movie preview webcast starring the Muppets. Another webshow featured Brandon Schantz and a movie spoof called The DiCaprio Code, parodying The Da Vinci Code.
