= Larry Beil =

American sportscaster

- Born: Lawrence A. Beil; 1960 or 1961 (age 65–66)
- Education: University of Hawaiʻi
- Occupation: sportscaster
- Spouse: Sharla Olsen (m. 1991)

Lawrence A. Beil (born 1960 or 1961 (age 65–66), also known as Larry Beil, is an American sportscaster and news anchor

== Biography ==
From 1996 to 1998, he was an anchor on SportsCenter, the flagship program of ESPN. Beil, who graduated from the University of Hawaiʻi in 1982, introduced a new catch phrase after showing a home run: "Aloha means goodbye." He also appeared in a This is SportsCenter ad in which he was introduced by ring announcer Michael Buffer, as if he were about to compete in a boxing match. After leaving ESPN, Beil became the sports director at KGO-TV, the ABC O&O in San Francisco. He is also a sports columnist for Yahoo and hosts a Yahoo webcast with former Seattle Seahawks player Joe Nash called SportStream. Prior to his work at ESPN, he was sports anchor and reporter at KTVU Channel 2 in Oakland and KGMB Channel 9 in Honolulu, Hawaii. Beil re-joined ESPN as a guest anchor for SportsCenter on August 3, 2016, June 20, 2017 and August 2, 2017.

In 2019, he began hosting the weekly podcast With Authority alongside Casey Pratt.

== Personal life ==
Beil married Hawaiian Airlines flight attendant Sharla Olsen in 1991. The couple have two daughters.
