= Blackhawk, California =

Unincorporated community in California, United States

- Census-designated place
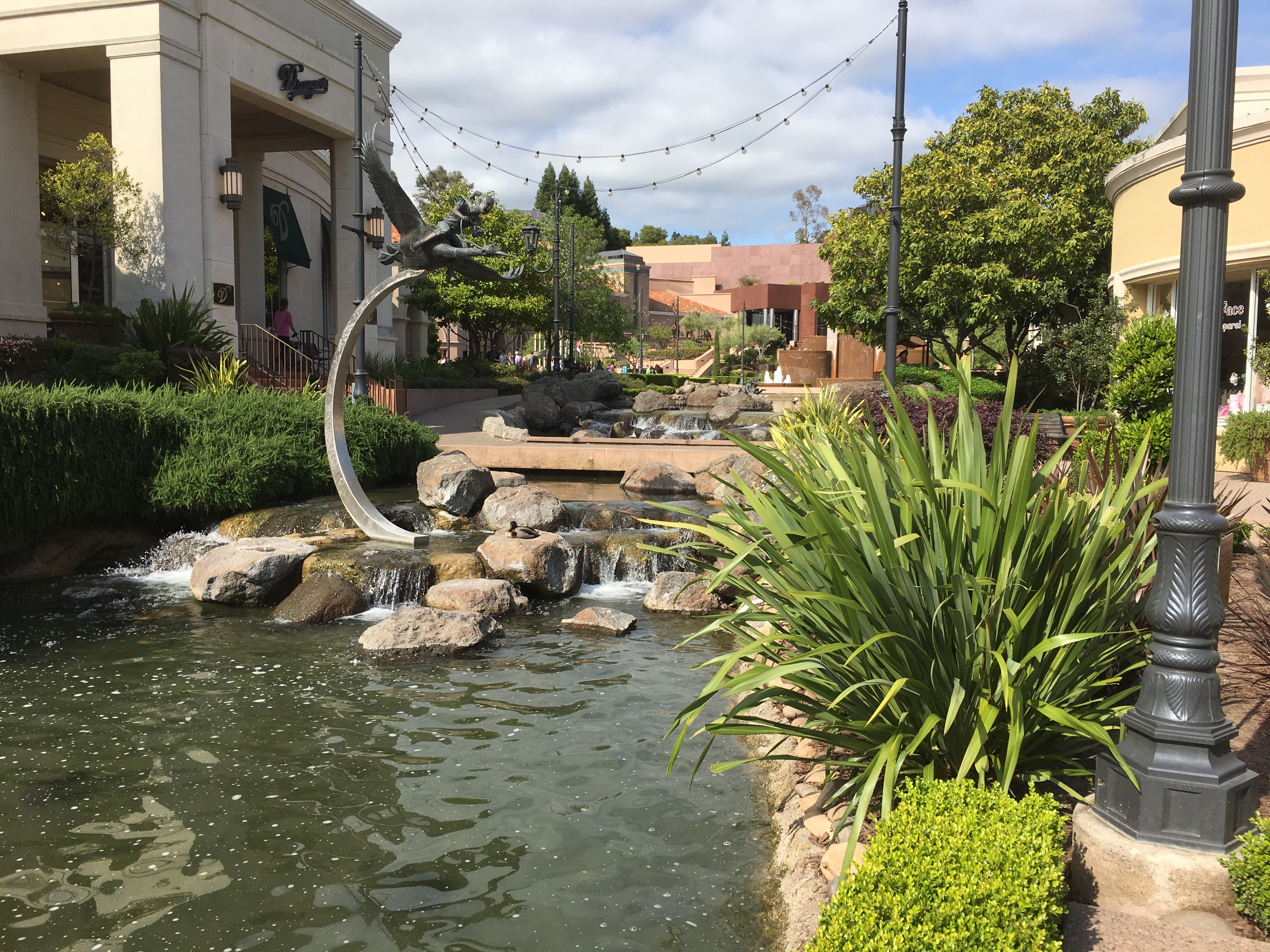
- Blackhawk Plaza in 2016

- Location of Blackhawk in Contra Costa County, California

- Location in California
- Coordinates: 37°49′15″N 121°54′28″W
- Country: United States
- State: California
- County: Contra Costa County

Area
  - Total: 5.79 sq mi (14.99 km^{2})
  - Land: 5.78 sq mi (14.96 km^{2})
  - Water: 0.012 sq mi (0.03 km^{2}) 0.17%
- Elevation: 997 ft (304 m)

Population (2020)
  - Total: 9,637
  - Density: 1,668.6/sq mi (644.26/km^{2})
- Time zone: UTC-8 (Pacific (PST))
  - Summer (DST): UTC-7 (PDT)
- FIPS code: 06-06928
- GNIS feature IDs: 1867000, 2407859

Blackhawk is an unincorporated planned community and census-designated place located in Contra Costa County, California, United States, east of Danville and Oakland. As of the 2020 census it had a population of 9,637. Governed by county rules/regulations and a homeowner association (HOA), Blackhawk has a country club, two golf courses, sports complex, restaurants, and abuts the Blackhawk Plaza mall. HOA dues provide 24-hour security plus additional law enforcement contracted through the Contra Costa County Sheriff's Office. The area is covered by the San Ramon Valley Fire Protection District. The ZIP code is 94506. The community is inside area code 925.

== Blackhawk Ranch ==
Blackhawk Ranch was established in 1917 by Ansel Mills Easton and his son-in-law William Q. Ward, in an area east of the San Ramon and Sycamore Valleys. The name came from an Irish racehorse named Blackhawk that Easton's family had once owned (who in turn was named for the Sauk chieftain Black Hawk). The land passed through the hands of several owners, including Raymond Force (the owner of the Caterpillar Tractor Company), the Hawaii-based sugar and pineapple company Castle & Cooke, and Howard Peterson (owner of Peterson Tractor).

== Development ==
In 1975, Peterson sold 6,200 acres (25 km^{2}) to Florida developer Ken Behring, who planned to develop 4,200 acres (17 km^{2}) into 4800 units of housing. Critics charged that given the distance from the freeway and the proposed size, the plan would have \negative impacts related to urban sprawl, environmental damage, and violations of the County General Plan. A group of environmentalists and local residents called Amigos de Diablo organized against the Blackhawk Development Corporation, but were sued for libel. The Blackhawk Development Corporation finally reduced the number of homes planned to 2400 and offered more than 2,000 acres (8 km^{2}) of open space to Mount Diablo State Park. The first phase of the housing development opened in 1979; it was completed in the early 1990s.

The development is a gated community and has two clubhouses as well as two 18-hole golf courses and other sports facilities. As of 2025, median house prices exceeded $2.4 million.

== Blackhawk Plaza ==
Blackhawk Plaza, opened in 1989 in an unincorporated part of Danville adjacent to Blackhawk, is an outdoor shopping center with a central duck pond. It houses the Blackhawk Museum and the five-screen Century Theatres in addition to retail stores and restaurants.

The mall has been overshadowed by other upscale shopping centers and has seen anchor tenants come and go, and since the COVID-19 shutdown, the movie theater, the supermarket, several clothing stores, and a restaurant have closed. It was purchased in 2020 by Ramanujan Group LLC, a real estate investment firm, who have fallen into arrears on loans, have been sued by the museum and by the owners of offices for failure to maintain the property, and as of July 2026 are seeking Chapter 11 bankruptcy.

== Demographics ==
Historical population
Census	Pop.	Note	%±
1990	6,199		—
2000	10,048		62.1%
2010	9,354		−6.9%
2020	9,637		3.0%
U.S. Decennial Census; 1990 2000 2010 2020

Blackhawk first appeared as a census designated place in the 1990 U.S. census. The CDP was renamed Blackhawk-Camino Tassajara in the 2000 U.S. census. The name was changed back to Blackhawk in the 2010 U.S. census; and a separate CDP under the name Camino Tassajara was formed out of adjacent territory.

=== Racial and ethnic composition ===
Blackhawk CDP, California – Racial and ethnic composition Note: the US Census treats Hispanic/Latino as an ethnic category. This table excludes Latinos from the racial categories and assigns them to a separate category. Hispanics/Latinos may be of any race.
Race / Ethnicity (NH = Non-Hispanic)	Pop 2000	Pop 2010	Pop 2020	% 2000	% 2010	% 2020
White alone (NH)	7,466	6,562	5,604	74.30%	70.15%	58.15%
Black or African American alone (NH)	226	167	154	2.25%	1.79%	1.60%
Native American or Alaska Native alone (NH)	18	10	9	0.18%	0.11%	0.09%
Asian alone (NH)	1,677	1,786	2,627	16.69%	19.09%	27.26%
Native Hawaiian or Pacific Islander alone (NH)	14	8	4	0.14%	0.09%	0.04%
Other Race alone (NH)	24	22	56	0.24%	0.24%	0.58%
Mixed race or Multiracial (NH)	232	335	493	2.31%	3.58%	5.12%
Hispanic or Latino (any race)	391	464	690	3.89%	4.96%	7.16%
Total	10,048	9,354	9,637	100.00%	100.00%	100.00%

=== 2020 census ===
As of the 2020 census, Blackhawk had a population of 9,637. The population density was 1,668.7 inhabitants per square mile (644.3/km^{2}). The median age was 50.3 years. 20.3% of residents were under the age of 18 and 24.9% of residents were 65 years of age or older. For every 100 females there were 93.7 males, and for every 100 females age 18 and over there were 91.0 males age 18 and over.

The census reported that 98.2% of the population lived in households, 0.4% lived in non-institutionalized group quarters, and 1.4% were institutionalized. 100.0% of residents lived in urban areas, while 0.0% lived in rural areas.

There were 3,395 households, out of which 31.2% had children under the age of 18 living in them. Of all households, 75.8% were married-couple households, 2.8% were cohabiting-couple households, 13.7% had a female householder with no spouse or partner present, and 7.7% had a male householder with no spouse or partner present. 12.2% of households were made up of individuals, and 7.5% had someone living alone who was 65 years of age or older. The average household size was 2.79. There were 2,882 families (84.9% of all households).

There were 3,515 housing units at an average density of 608.7 units per square mile (235.0 units/km^{2}), of which 3,395 (96.6%) were occupied and 3.4% were vacant. Of occupied units, 90.6% were owner-occupied and 9.4% were occupied by renters. The homeowner vacancy rate was 0.8% and the rental vacancy rate was 4.5%.

=== Income and poverty ===
In 2023, the US Census Bureau estimated that the median household income was $239,681, and the per capita income was $136,706. About 4.9% of families and 5.2% of the population were below the poverty line.

=== 2010 census ===
The 2010 United States census reported that Blackhawk had a population of 9,354. The population density was 1,609.7 inhabitants per square mile (621.5/km^{2}). The racial makeup of Blackhawk was 6,882 (73.6%) White, 172 (1.8%) African American, 15 (0.2%) Native American, 1,801 (19.3%) Asian, 8 (0.1%) Pacific Islander, 75 (0.8%) from other races, and 401 (4.3%) from two or more races. Hispanic or Latino of any race were 464 persons (5.0%).

The Census reported that 100% of the population lived in households.

There were 3,345 households, out of which 1,241 (37.1%) had children under the age of 18 living in them, 2,661 (79.6%) were opposite-sex married couples living together, 155 (4.6%) had a female householder with no husband present, 86 (2.6%) had a male householder with no wife present. There were 76 (2.3%) unmarried opposite-sex partnerships, and 21 (0.6%) same-sex married couples or partnerships. 355 households (10.6%) were made up of individuals, and 145 (4.3%) had someone living alone who was 65 years of age or older. The average household size was 2.80. There were 2,902 families (86.8% of all households); the average family size was 3.00.

The population was spread out, with 2,271 people (24.3%) under the age of 18, 502 people (5.4%) aged 18 to 24, 1,394 people (14.9%) aged 25 to 44, 3,875 people (41.4%) aged 45 to 64, and 1,312 people (14.0%) who were 65 years of age or older. The median age was 48.0 years. For every 100 females, there were 96.3 males. For every 100 females age 18 and over, there were 94.6 males.

There were 3,477 housing units at an average density of 598.3 per square mile (231.0/km^{2}), of which 3,345 were occupied, of which 3,044 (91.0%) were owner-occupied, and 301 (9.0%) were occupied by renters. The homeowner vacancy rate was 1.3%; the rental vacancy rate was 3.8%. 8,400 people (89.8% of the population) lived in owner-occupied housing units and 954 people (10.2%) lived in rental housing units.

== Education ==
As of the 2020 census, all of Blackhawk was in the San Ramon Valley Unified School District.

== Popular culture ==
Blackhawk is mentioned in the hit song "Salvation" by the punk band Rancid, as a place "where all the rich people are/hide".

Blackhawk is also mentioned in The Lonely Island's short film The Unauthorized Bash Brothers Experience as the place where the Bash Brothers reside.

A further reference is made in the song "Spike" on the album Money Money 2020 by the group The Network, which includes members from Green Day.

== See also ==
- Danville, California
