= Safari Club International =

American hunters' rights organization

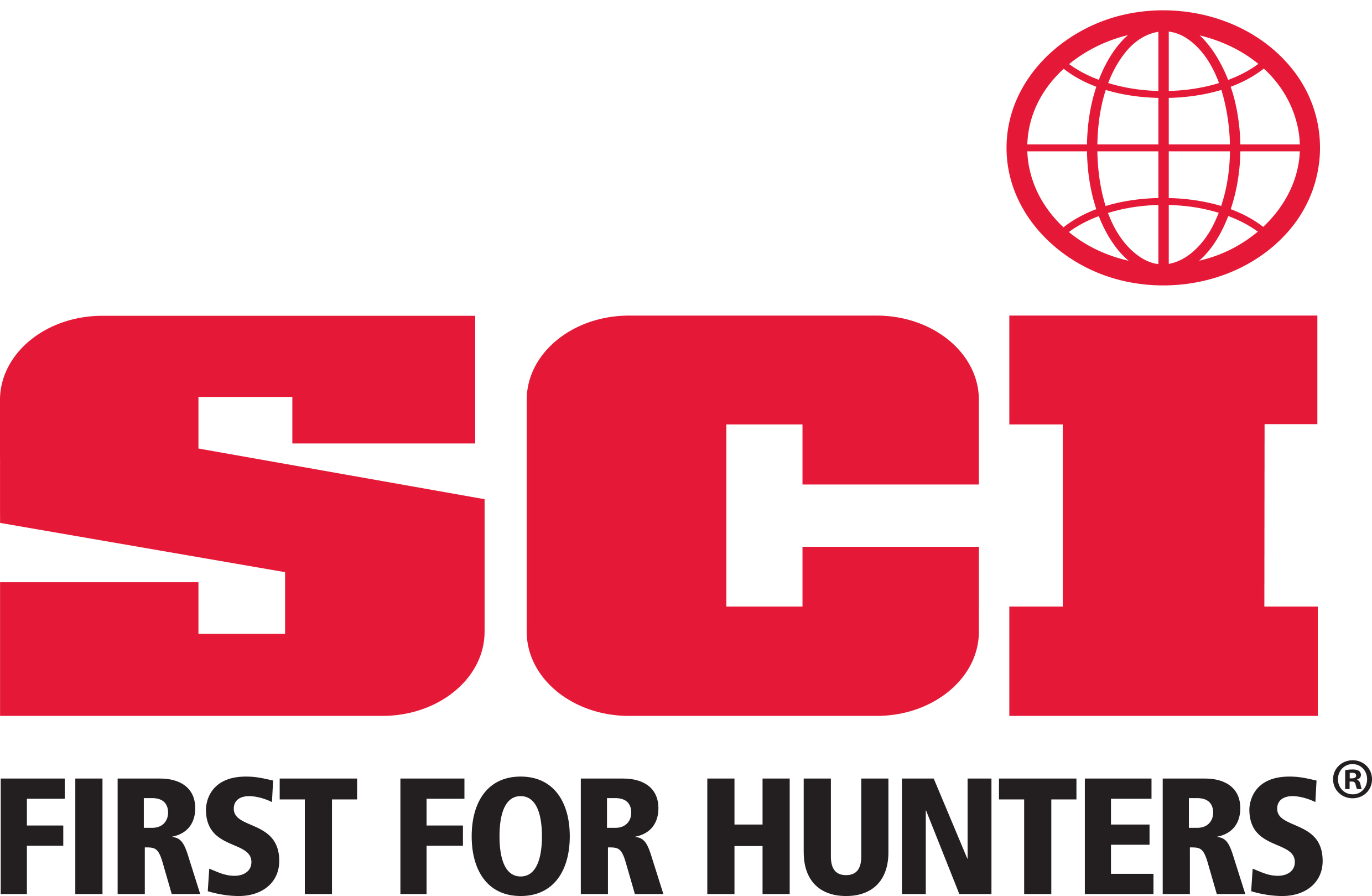
- Formation: 1973
- Type: Social welfare organization
- Tax ID no.: 86-0974183
- Headquarters: Washington DC
- Members: 50,000
- Website: www.safariclub.org

Safari Club International (SCI) is a US organization composed of hunters dedicated to protecting the "freedom to hunt."

== Leadership ==
Safari Club International was founded by C.J. McElroy and fellow hunters in 1972. He was forced to resign in 1988.

In 1971, the SCI Los Angeles chapter, now recognized as the precursor, gave rise to Safari Club International (SCI). A pivotal moment occurred during the regular meeting on March 9, 1972, as "The Los Angeles Safari Club" underwent a name change to "Safari Club International." Member Loren Lutz proposed that the Safari Club of Los Angeles should be the inaugural chapter of the newly formed Safari Club International. This motion received unanimous approval from the 80-plus members in attendance. SCI held its first convention in 1973.

Notable leaders include businessman and philanthropist Ken Behring, one of the world's leading big game trophy hunters and SCI's largest donor at one point, and outdoor journalist Craig Boddington, who joined in 1977. He served as President of the Los Angeles chapter from 1982 to 1984 and won the SCI's C. J. McElroy Award in 2008.

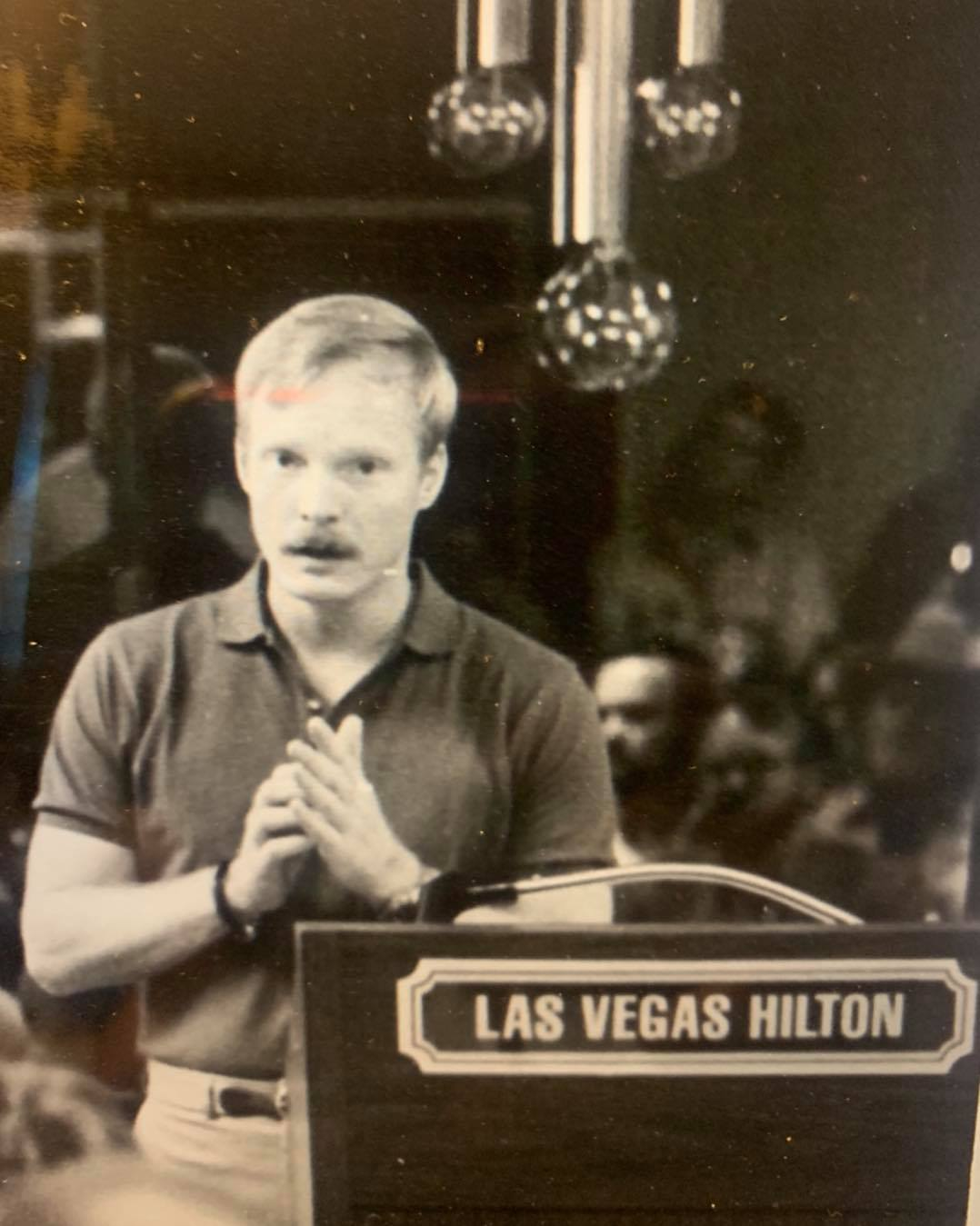
Craig Boddington speaking at the Safari Club International Convention

== Locations ==
SCI’s headquarters are located in Washington DC. The legislative office is located in Washington, DC, within walking distance of Capitol Hill. Its sister organization, the SCI Foundation, operated a wildlife museum in Tucson from 1988 to 2023, which is now permanently closed. It also owns the Granite Ranch in the Bridger-Teton National Forest, south of Jackson Hole, Wyoming, where it hosts the American Wilderness Leadership School.

== Safari Club International Foundation ==
SCI's sister organization, the Safari Club International Foundation, is a nonprofit organization "dedicated to wildlife conservation, outdoor education, and humanitarian services." Although this foundation was set up by SCI and shares some board members with SCI, it is a separate legal entity. The SCI Foundation operates a number of programs. Sportsmen Against Hunger began in 1989, and through the network of SCI chapters, provides food banks with meat from harvested animals. SCI reported in 2006 that over 250,000 lb of wild game were donated to charitable relief organizations. The Sensory Safari program allows sight-impaired individuals to get a "visual" perspective of what animals are like by feeling mounts, skins, skulls, horns, and antlers. The National Federation of the Blind (NFB) asked SCIF to host a Sensory Safari at its annual convention. In 1997, the NFB signed a memorandum of understanding with SCI to host Sensory Safaris at all future NFB national and state conventions. Hunters who participate in the SafariCare program take bags filled by SCI chapters with medical, school, and relief supplies to clinics and schools in remote regions of the developing world. The SafariWish program, part of the SafariCare program, is designed to give children with life-threatening illnesses a chance to go hunting. The Disabled Hunter program, through SCI chapters, provides sponsorship for hunting trips for disabled sportsmen.

== Annual hunters' convention ==
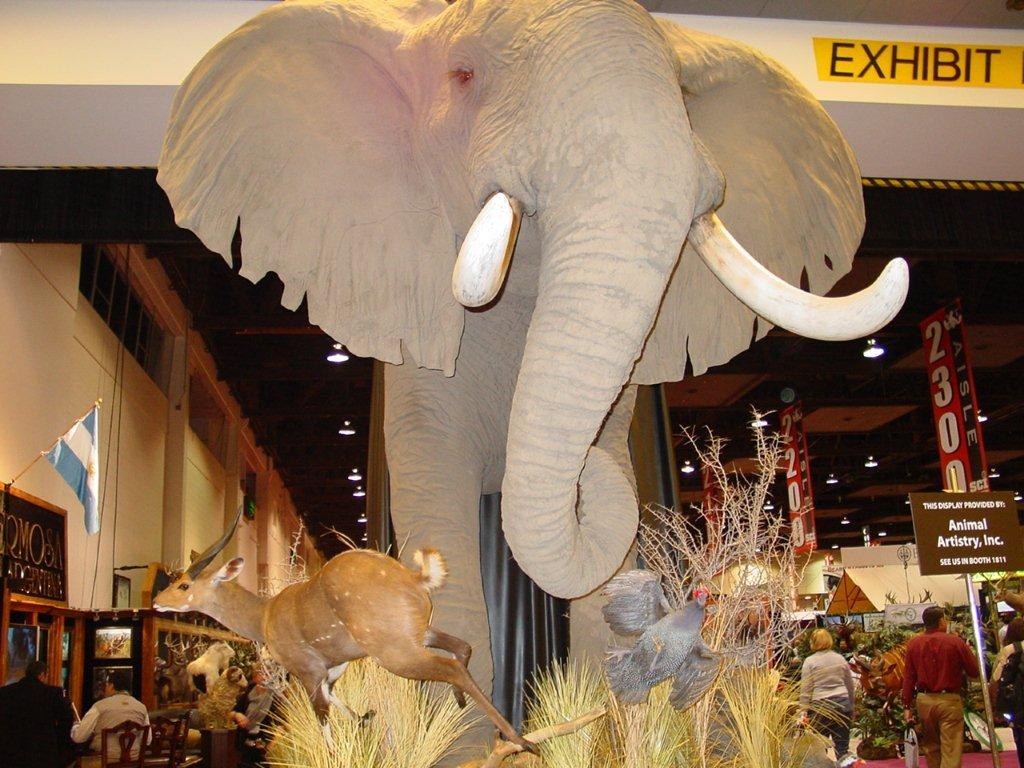
Taxidermy display from SCI 2011 hunters' convention

In 2023, over 850 exhibitors from 30 different nations converged in Tennessee for the yearly assembly of Safari Club International, an event aimed at advocating for hunting.

== Record Book ==
The Safari Club International Record Book is the largest such record-keeping system in the world.

== Political lobbying ==
In 1979, when SCI was relatively new, it sought government approval to import 1,125 trophies from 40 different species (gorillas, cheetahs, tigers, orangutans, snow leopards, and others) into the US for "scientific research and incentive for propagation and survival of the species." Because the animals were to be hunted, the U.S. Fish and Wildlife Service denied the request.

=== Polar bear imports ===
In 1994, SCI successfully lobbied for a change in the U.S. Marine Mammal Protection Act of 1972 to allow for the importation of previously banned, legally hunted polar bear trophies into the United States from Canada. In 2007, SCI testified at a U.S. Fish and Wildlife Service (FWS) hearing opposing the proposed listing of polar bears as a "threatened" species under the U.S. Endangered Species Act. The FWS is concerned that climate change places polar bears at risk of extinction. SCI stated, "[...] [T]he U.S. decision to list will merely change the identity of those who hunt the animals from U.S. hunters to exclusively native residents[...]"

== Criticism ==
=== Endangered species ===
SCI has been criticized by the Humane Society of the United States (HSUS) for supporting the hunting of endangered African antelope species at game ranches in Texas and Florida and for giving awards for hunting African leopards, elephants, lions, rhinos, and buffaloes.

SCI, along with other hunting and nonhunting organizations, intervened in a federal suit where HSUS challenged regulations that allow hunting of captive scimitar-horned oryx, dama gazelle, and addax. The FWS found that, "[c]aptive breeding in the United States has enhanced the propagation or survival of the scimitar-horned oryx, addax, and dama gazelle worldwide by rescuing these species from near extinctions and providing the founder stock necessary for reintroduction. The scimitar-horned oryx is extinct in the wild across its range in North Africa, having been last seen in Niger and Chad in the mid-1980s. The dama gazelle and addax are rumored to exist in only a few small and highly fragmented populations in the most remote parts of the Sahara Desert. According to SCI, however, healthy populations of all three species still exist in the United States. Sport hunting of surplus, captive-bred animals generates revenue that supports these captive-breeding operations and may relieve hunting pressure on wild populations." As of February 2008, this case was still pending. In the case of the black rhino, 83% of those countries represented at the 2004 CITES meeting approved sport hunting of the species in very limited numbers.

=== Members engaged in unethical hunting practices and poaching ===
Ken Behring was a former president of SCI and was at one time its largest donor. He has made multiple safari trips to East Africa, and has shot lions, leopards, rhinoceroses, an elephant, and a bighorn sheep. Behring has been criticized for his trophy-hunting practices and animal-conservation ethics.

In 1997, Behring shot an endangered Kara Tau argali sheep in Kazakhstan (only 100 remained in the world at the time). Behring claimed he had permits to shoot the sheep and had Russian scientists in his hunting party; he was issued export permits two days before the enactment of a prior international decision to move Kara Tau argali to the most-endangered status. Per American law, the remains of the endangered animal could not be legally imported into the United States. Behring donated $20 million to the Smithsonian National Museum of Natural History six weeks later, offering his private collection of stuffed hunting trophies to the museum, including four rare bighorn sheep, one of which was the Kara Tau argali sheep. The Smithsonian attempted to import the remains by petitioning the Department of the Interior for an Endangered Species Act waiver, but withdrew its request after questioning and negative publicity from Representative George Miller and groups like the HSUS. Behring maintained that he had broken no laws, and had shot the animal legally while assisting Kazakh scientists. The National Museum of Natural History subsequently re-evaluated their acquisitions policies in light of the charges.

In 1998, Behring shot and killed an elephant in Mozambique, where the sport killing of elephants was banned in 1990. His hunting companions, the then past and current presidents of Safari Club International, killed two more elephants. Mozambican wildlife officials believed that the group had come "to survey investment opportunities" in Cabo Delgado province. The group was given a permit by the governor to shoot a lion, a leopard, and a buffalo; a local wildlife official also added a note referring to "problem elephants", the only exception to the national ban on the killing of elephants. According to Arlito Cuco, head of Mozambique's wildlife service, a federal investigation showed that the hunt was illegal because it did not target problem elephants, and that two of the elephant tusks had gone missing. Local investigators also reported that the group used a helicopter during the hunt, which "drove the elephants onto their guns"—a charge they denied. According to the New York Times, Behring's spokesperson "sent a reporter a copy of a $5,000 check, dated six weeks after the hunt and made out to the provincial government with the notation 'elephant permit.'" The then-director of the game reserve near where the elephants had been killed was skeptical, telling ABC News PrimeTime, "They came in there and bankrolled an operation to take out some big elephant, and it is wrong. And nobody, nobody can condone what happened."

SCI was founded by trophy hunter C.J. McElroy, who claimed to be the greatest trophy hunter in the world. McElroy hunted in nearly 50 countries, on six continents. He killed nearly 400 trophy animals that appear in SCI's record book, including animals that are now endangered and can no longer be hunted. McElroy was forced to resign in 1988. Bill Quimby, a past president of SCI, writes in his book Safari Club International that rumors were passed among hunters that McElroy "ignored hunting laws", that McElroy was even accused of killing a Rocky Mountain bighorn ram in a national park, and that his "ideas of sportsmanship and ethics simply were different from those of hunters who came along later."

=== Cecil the lion ===
Cecil the lion was a lion that lived primarily in the Hwange National Park in Matabeleland North, Zimbabwe. He was a major attraction at the park and was being studied and tracked by the University of Oxford as part of a larger study. He was initially wounded with an arrow by Walter Palmer, an American dentist and SCI member, then tracked, and reportedly killed with a rifle about 40 hours later on 1 July 2015. Palmer says that Cecil was killed with a bow and arrow in much less than 40 hours after the lion was first wounded.

Following outcry over the killing, Palmer's SCI membership was suspended. Charges against Palmer were eventually dropped by the Zimbabwean Government.

== Revenue sources ==
For the tax year ending June 2006, SCI reported $2.87 million in revenue from SCI publications; $3.17 million in membership dues; $205,967 in interest on savings and temporary investments; $75,771 from sales of assets other than inventory; $6.86 million from special events such as the annual convention; $156,014 from sales of inventory; and $6,089 miscellaneous income.

In 2007, the New York legislature earmarked $50,000 of public funds for SCI.
