= Ken Hofmann =

American businessman (1923–2018)

Kenneth Harry Hofmann
- Born: February 15, 1923
- Died: April 22, 2018 (aged 95)
- Occupations: Builder, real estate developer, philanthropist

Kenneth Harry Hofmann (February 15, 1923 – April 22, 2018) was an American builder, real estate developer, and philanthropist. He was an owner of the Seattle Seahawks of the National Football League from 1988 to 1997, in partnership with Ken Behring, and of the Oakland Athletics of Major League Baseball from 1995 to 2005, in partnership with Stephen Schott.

== Biography ==
Born in Oakland, California, Hofmann attended Fremont High School and Saint Mary's College of California, then graduated from the United States Merchant Marine Academy. In 1948 he became a licensed plastering contractor, in 1951 a licensed building contractor, and in 1957 he founded The Hofmann Company, in Concord, California, which has built thousands of houses and apartments, owns athletic clubs and a golf course, and has developed communities such as Discovery Bay, California. In 1986, the California Homebuilding Foundation (the research and education foundation for the California Building Industry Association) named him to its hall of fame. He was a prominent supporter of De La Salle High School in Concord, California providing generous funding, and by sponsoring the De La Salle Academy for underprivileged students – providing tutors, food, and books to youngsters before reaching their high school years. Through his K. H. Hofmann Foundation, Hofmann donated 100 acres to build the Concord Pavilion, and he was a transitional donor to the cardiac high rise building at the John Muir Medical Center Concord, with a donation of US$10 million.

== Personal life ==
Hofmann loved playing and especially enjoyed waterfowl hunting and salmon fishing. "In his early years, he was also an avid aviator. He was married for 60 years to the former Jean England. He and Jean had three daughters and eight grandchildren, all of whom live within a two mile radius of their home in Lafayette, California."
