= Danville station (California) =

- Southern Pacific Railroad Depot
- U.S. National Register of Historic Places
- U.S. Historic district
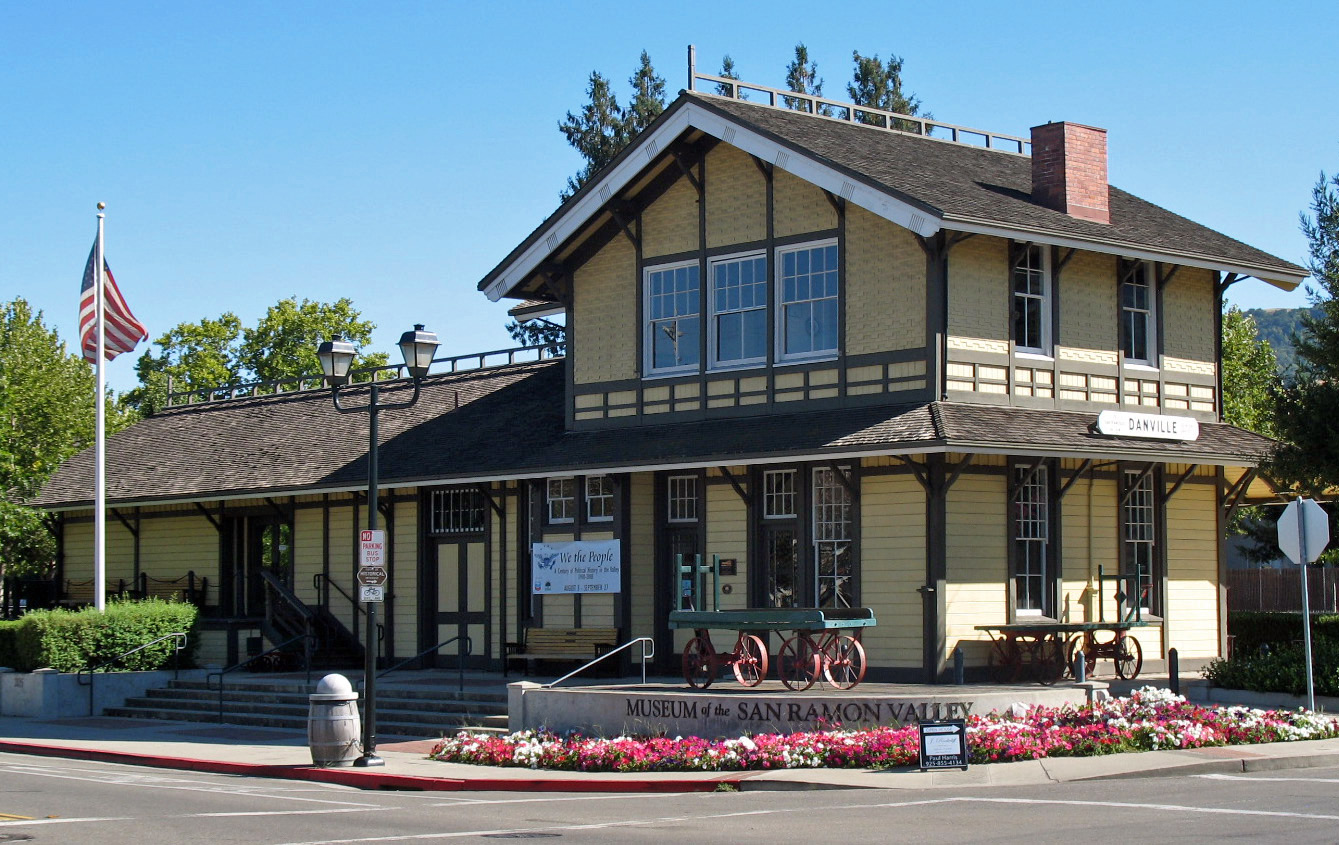

- Location within California Location within the United States
- Nearest city: Danville, California
- Coordinates: 37°49′14.54″N 122°0′1.84″W
- Area: less than one acre
- Built by: Southern Pacific Railroad
- Architectural style: Victorian: Stick/Eastlake
- NRHP reference No.: 94000860
- Added to NRHP: August 16, 1994

The Danville Southern Pacific Train Depot in Danville, California is located at 205 Railroad Ave. and W Prospect Ave. It was built in 1891 on land donated by John Hartz which was erected when the Martinez line was extended south to San Ramon. The first train came on June 7, 1891. Passenger service ended in 1934. The Southern Pacific Railroad trains continued to pass through town with freight until 1978 when the line was abandoned. The building was sold in 1951 for the Danville Supply and Feed store. In June 1996, it was purchased and moved 100 yards.

It was a passenger and freight station built to the design titled "Combination Station No. 22" out of standard designs of the Southern Pacific.

In 2018 it houses the Museum of the San Ramon Valley. It lies along the Iron Horse Regional Trail, a rail trail formed from the converted Southern Pacific right of way.

Preceding station	Southern Pacific Railroad	Following station
Walnut Creek toward Avon	Avon – San Ramon	San Ramon Terminus

== See also ==
- National Register of Historic Places listings in Contra Costa County, California
