= Ken Behring =

American developer and sports team owner (1928-2019)

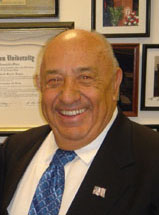
- Born: Kenneth Eugene Behring; June 13, 1928; Freeport, Illinois, U.S.
- Died: June 25, 2019 (aged 91); Contra Costa County, California, U.S.
- Occupations: Real estate developer Football team owner Philanthropist
- Spouse: Patricia Behring
- Children: 5

Kenneth Eugene Behring (June 13, 1928 – June 25, 2019) was an American real estate developer, and former owner of the National Football League's Seattle Seahawks.

== Early years ==
Born in Freeport, Illinois, Behring was the son of Mae (Priewe) and Elmer Behring. When he was four, his family moved to Monroe, Wisconsin, about 25 miles (40 km) north of Freeport. He grew up in poverty; his father worked in a lumber yard making 25 cents an hour, and his mother cleaned houses. Behring started working a variety of jobs around town starting at age seven: mowing lawns, caddying, transporting milk, selling newspapers, working at a grocery store, and at a lumberyard. He became a salesperson at Montgomery Ward at age 16, and started a side business selling sporting goods in town while attending Monroe High School.

A high school football player, he received a partial football scholarship to the University of Wisconsin–Madison, but dropped out of college due to an injury that left him unable to play football, and therefore ineligible for his scholarship.

== Career ==
Elaine Chao meeting Ken Behring, 2002

Out of college, Behring (a car enthusiast) worked as a salesperson at a Chevrolet and Chrysler auto dealership. At age 21, he started Behring Motors, a used car business in Monroe. A savvy businessman, he was earning $50,000 a year and had $1 million in assets by age 27.

Behring moved from Wisconsin to Florida in 1956 and started the Behring Construction Company in Fort Lauderdale. He became a land developer, founding Tamarac Lakes, a new active-adult (which later became all-age) community in 1962. It was built on an area that was formerly wetlands, pastures, and fields. The new development was incorporated as Tamarac, Florida on July 25, 1963. Behring's company eventually became the largest builder of single-family homes in Florida, and the tenth largest in the United States.

In 1972, Behring moved to the San Francisco Bay Area, where he was involved in developing the country club at Blackhawk, California, and later, the Canyon Lakes Development in San Ramon, California.

In 1988, Behring and partner Ken Hofmann purchased the NFL's Seattle Seahawks football team from the Nordstrom family for $80 million. After the 1995 season, Behring attempted to transfer team's operations to the Rams’ former facilities in Anaheim, California in an effort to relocate the Seahawks as he grew increasingly dissatisfied with the conditions of the Kingdome, a widely criticized move. Behring had failed to properly apply for relocation, on top of having his plans for a full move being scuttled when lawyers discovered that the Seahawks were locked into the Kingdome through 2005; in addition, the NFL threatened to fine Behring up to $900,000 a day if he did not retract the team from Southern California. Behring was forced to sell the Seahawks to Microsoft co-founder Paul Allen in 1997 for $200 million, who elected to keep the team in Seattle.

Behring was listed several times on the annual Forbes 400 list of richest Americans, including 1991, 1995, and 1997. In 1997, his last year on the list, he ranked #395, with an estimated net worth of $495 million. He was later described in the press as a billionaire.

In 2004, Behring published a memoir called Road to Purpose: One Man's Journey Bringing Hope to Millions and Finding Purpose Along the Way. In 2013, he published a revised edition of the memoir titled The Road to Leadership: Finding a Life of Purpose.

== Family ==
Behring married his wife Patricia (Pat) at age 21. They had five sons, and as of 2018, ten grandchildren and two great-grandchildren.

== Philanthropy ==
Behring was involved in founding the Blackhawk Museum (originally the Blackhawk Automotive Museum) in 1988, created, in part, to house his personal collection of vintage cars; he was criticized for the tax exemption he sought and received for donating his cars to his museum.

Behring pledged $20 million to the Smithsonian Institution's National Museum of Natural History in 1997, with the intention that it be used for educational purposes. At the time, the money was allocated for refurbishing the museum's rotunda, supporting a traveling exhibition, and endowing the museum's new Kenneth E. Behring Family Hall of Mammals, which opened in 2003. There were concerns around the terms of the donation, linked to Behring's endangered species hunting controversy. According to the Smithsonian's website, the 22,500-square-foot (2,090 m^{2}) space now features 274 mammal specimens, nearly a dozen fossils, and a variety of interactive learning experiences. The exhibit is said to provide visitors with a global perspective of how mammals have adapted to different habitats, and includes four "Discovery Zones" for hands-on exploration of mammal adaptations such as night vision and goose bumps.

Behring pledged another $80 million to the Smithsonian's National Museum of American History in 2000. Of the $80 million, $20 million was allocated for a hall honoring "American legends and legacies", paying "tribute to deceased individuals who made great contributions to our country and who truly epitomize the 'American spirit'", $4 million paid for an exhibition on the American presidency, and another $16 million funded an exhibit called "The Price of Freedom: Americans at War", opened in 2004. In return, Behring's contract required that the museum rename its main facility the "Behring Center". MuseumNews called Behring's donation "purportedly the largest cash donation ever to be given to a U.S. museum by a living person", and Behring was given the Smithsonian's James Smithson Award for his contributions. In 2001, a memorandum by a group of curators and scholars at the Museum of American History expressed concerns about Behring's gift, and criticized the museum for hiring Behring's personal architect to do a study on modernizing the museum's exhibition space; a Smithsonian official denied accusations of impropriety. According to The New York Times, Behring's gift was also then criticized in the museum world, as some museum professionals charged that he had been given too much power to "dictate the nature and content of the museum's exhibitions." According to then-Smithsonian Secretary Lawrence Small, "A gift of this magnitude is unprecedented. We are delighted to honor this great benefactor to the Smithsonian Institution by establishing the Behring Center. Mr. Behring's generous contribution will allow us to being a complete transformation and modernization of the National Museum of American History, the only museum of its kind in the world."

In 2000, Behring also donated $7.5 million to expand the University of California, Berkeley's Principal Leadership Institute; the newly established Kenneth E. Behring Center for Educational Improvement focused on training programs for public-school principals, providing scholarships for fifty aspiring principals every year. UC Berkeley awarded him a Chancellor's Citation in 2001.

Behring founded the Wheelchair Foundation in Blackhawk, California in 2000, to provide free wheelchairs for people with physical disabilities in developing nations unable to afford one. As of September 2013, the Wheelchair Foundation had given away over 940,000 wheelchairs in 152 countries around the globe. He also founded the WaterLeaders Foundation, a nonprofit group working to support safe drinking water around the world, in 2005. In a 2010 interview, he estimated having given away between $200 and $300 million and described his interest in issues of global health.

In 2009, Behring made a $1.9 million donation to National History Day, intended to "improve the teaching and learning of history at middle and high schools throughout the country."

Behring was also active with the Global Health and Education Foundation, a "united network of charitable organizations" which subsumes the Wheelchair Foundation and is described as "Behring's larger charity umbrella."

In 2014, Behring added a section to the Blackhawk Museum called The Spirit of the Old West, a permanent exhibit focusing on the Old West of the 1800s. The majority of the collection was provided by Jerry Fick, who built up the collection over a period of 60 years.

== Controversies ==
=== Sexual harassment ===
A 1999 story in Seattle Weekly reported that "Behring...settled several sex harassment claims in recent years." The most prominent of these cases was the 1996 allegation by former employee Patricia Parker that she had been sexually harassed over the course of two years, and assaulted at a New Year's Day event, while being "required to cover for Behring's sexual activities and liaisions in the executive offices with a number of women." The New York Times reported that Parker "accused Behring of making advances, asking her to pick up his prescription sex-enhancing drugs and requiring she keep waivers on hand for his potential sex partners to sign away their rights to demand money of him." Behring denied the charges, and the case was settled out of court in 1996.

=== Engagement in unethical hunting practices and poaching ===
Behring was a former president of Safari Club International and was at one time its largest donor. He has made multiple safari trips to East Africa, and has shot lions, leopards, rhinoceroses, an elephant, and an endangered bighorn sheep. He has been criticized for his trophy hunting practices and animal conservation ethics.

In 1997, Behring shot an endangered Kara Tau argali sheep in Kazakhstan (only 100 remained in the world at the time). He claimed he had permits to shoot the sheep and had Russian scientists in his hunting party; he was issued export permits two days before the enactment of a prior international decision to move Kara Tau argali to most-endangered status. Per American law, the remains of the endangered animal could not be legally imported into the United States. Behring donated $20 million to the Smithsonian National Museum of Natural History six weeks later, offering his private collection of stuffed hunting trophies to the museum, including four rare bighorn sheep, one of which was the Kara Tau argali sheep. The Smithsonian attempted to import the remains by petitioning the Department of the Interior for an Endangered Species Act waiver, but withdrew its request after questioning and negative publicity from Representative George Miller and groups like the Humane Society of the United States. Behring maintained that he had broken no laws, and had shot the animal legally while assisting Kazakh scientists. The National Museum of Natural History subsequently reevaluated their acquisitions policies in light of the charges.

In 1998, Behring shot and killed an elephant in Mozambique, where the sport killing of elephants was banned in 1990. His hunting companions, the then past and current presidents of Safari Club International, killed two more elephants. Mozambican wildlife officials believed that the group had come "to survey investment opportunities" in Cabo Delgado Province. The group was given a permit by the governor to shoot a lion, a leopard and a buffalo; a local wildlife official also added a note referring to "problem elephants," the only exception to the national ban on the killing of elephants. According to Arlito Cuco, head of Mozambique's wildlife service, a federal investigation showed that the hunt was illegal because it did not target problem elephants, and that two of the elephant tusks had gone missing. Local investigators also reported that the group used a helicopter during the hunt, which "drove the elephants onto their guns"—a charge they denied. According to The New York Times, Behring's spokesperson "sent a reporter a copy of a $5,000 check, dated six weeks after the hunt and made out to the provincial government with the notation 'elephant permit.'" The then-director of the game reserve near where the elephants had been killed was skeptical, telling ABC News Primetime, "They came in there and bankrolled an operation to take out some big elephant, and it is wrong. And nobody, nobody can condone what happened."

== Death ==
Behring died in 2019 at age 91 in Contra Costa County, California. On June 28, the Seahawks released a statement: "We are saddened by the loss of former Seahawks owner Ken Behring. We send our heartfelt condolences to Mr. Behring's family and friends."

Sporting positions
Preceded by Herman Sarkowsky	Seattle Seahawks owner (with Ken Hofmann); 1988–1997	Succeeded by Paul Allen
