= Sycamore Creek (Contra Costa County) =

Perennial stream in California, US

Sycamore Creek is a perennial stream in Contra Costa County, in the U.S. state of California. It is a tributary of San Ramon Creek which is part of the Walnut Creek watershed. There is a trail along a portion of Sycamore Creek, which has been developed by the city of Danville, California and the East Bay Municipal Utility District.

In the late summer very low flows are realized; moreover, in the late summer, which is toward the end of the dry season, the waters appear murky green, and much of the creek consists of a chain of stagnant pools. No noticeable odors emanate from this stream. Concrete and rock reinforcements are present all along the creekbed in much of the stream. The creek receives surface runoff from open space and residential land use. A fairly rich but narrow corridor of riparian vegetation appears along much of the middle reach creek bed, including cattails, numerous tree species, and a variety of herbaceous plants. The creek flows at considerable force during the rainy season (November to March), and once a week in the summer water is released from a private reservoir upstream located next to Old Blackhawk Road.

The headwaters of Sycamore Creek rise on Mount Diablo, a protected nature reserve. This scenic upper reach has some Miocene fossil-bearing formations; moreover, the upper headwaters reach is habitat for numerous rare species and endangered species including several serpentine endemics. Much of the middle-reach 5 miles (8 km) of Sycamore Creek reveal limited potential for hazardous materials contamination, as the developments abutting the stream bed consist of a country club, residential development and rural land use.

== See also ==
- Riparian zone
