= 80th Scripps National Spelling Bee =

Spelling bee held in the United States in 2007

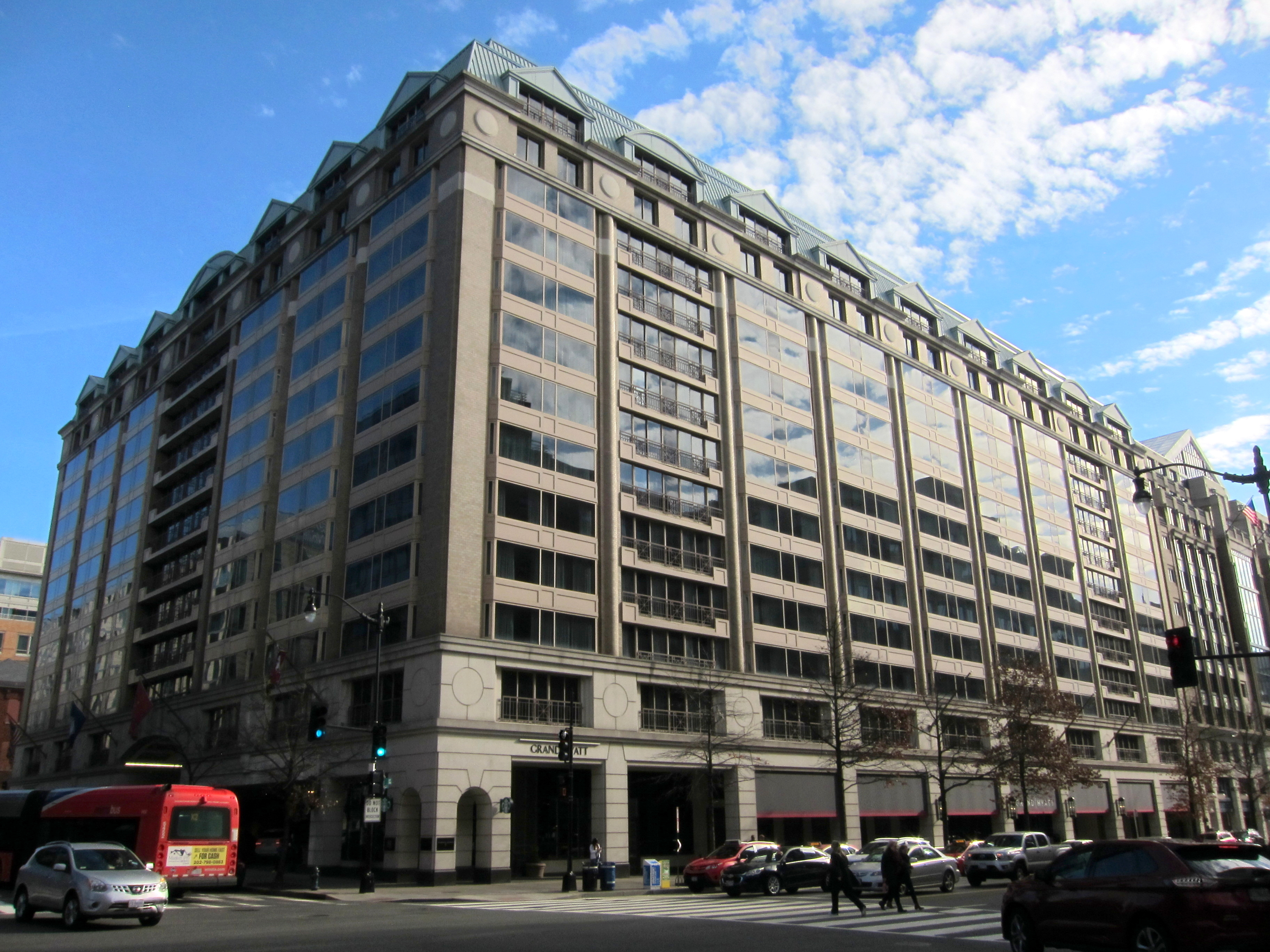
- The Grand Hyatt Washington in Washington, D.C., hosted the Scripps National Spelling Bee.
- Date: May 30–31, 2007
- Location: Grand Hyatt Washington, Washington, D.C.
- Winner: Evan O'Dorney (13 at time of win)
- Sponsor: Contra Costa Times
- Winning word: serrefine
- No. of contestants: 286
- Pronouncer: Jacques Bailly

The 80th Scripps National Spelling Bee was held on May 30–31, 2007.

The winner was 13-year-old Evan O'Dorney from Danville, California. He won in Round 13 by correctly spelling serrefine. The runner-up was Nate Gartke from Edmonton, Canada, who misspelled coryza.

There were 286 spellers this year, 139 boys and 147 girls. Fifty-nine survived the first day. By lunchtime of day two, it was down to 33, and 15 by 2 pm. Andrew Lay's correct spelling of "negus" and surprised response and Kennyi Aouad laughing upon hearing "sardoodledom" became popular video snippets. The showdown began between O'Dorney and Gartke when both contestants were the last to survive correctly spelling 7 consecutive words each.

The first place prize was $50,000 in cash, and additional prizes from Scripps.

The championship finals aired live on ABC from 8:00 PM to shortly after 10:00 p.m. EDT.

== Word list championship round ==
- coccyx
- yamisce
- fiancé
- imbroglio
- xanthippe
- Cebulska
- Reykjavik
- soteurre
- centillion
- pneutte
- seatur
- juxtaposition
- tete-a-tete
- ubiquitous
- amelioration
- psychedelic
- ennui
- calicette
- cul-de-sac
- communiqué
- daiquiri
- jodhpurs
- paradigm
- soyeut
- chamois
- quay
- sepulchre
- empousai
- segue
- derailleur
- yosenabe
- coryza
- serrefine
