= Danville, California =

City in California, United States

Danville
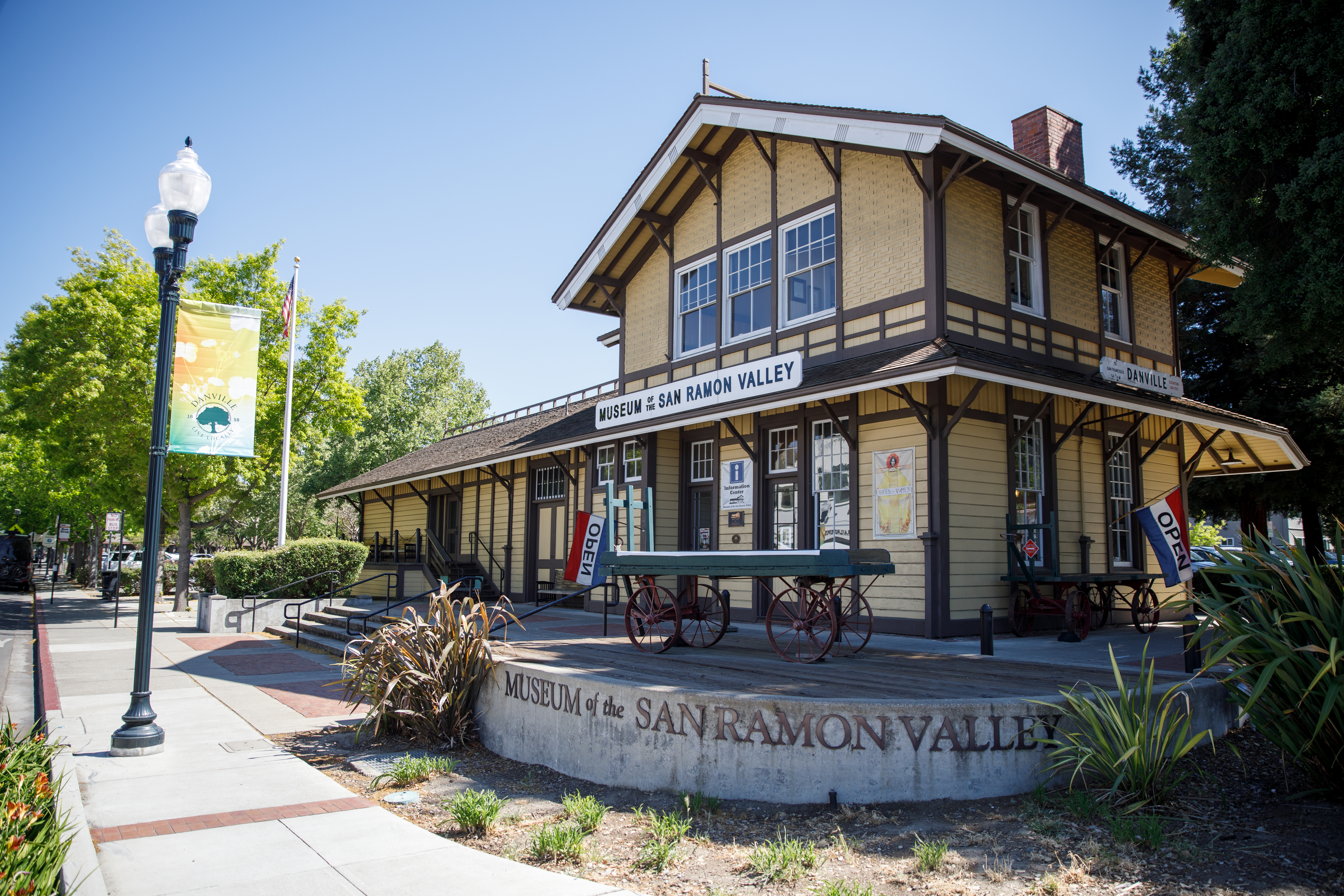
- Museum of the San Ramon Valley, pictured in 2021

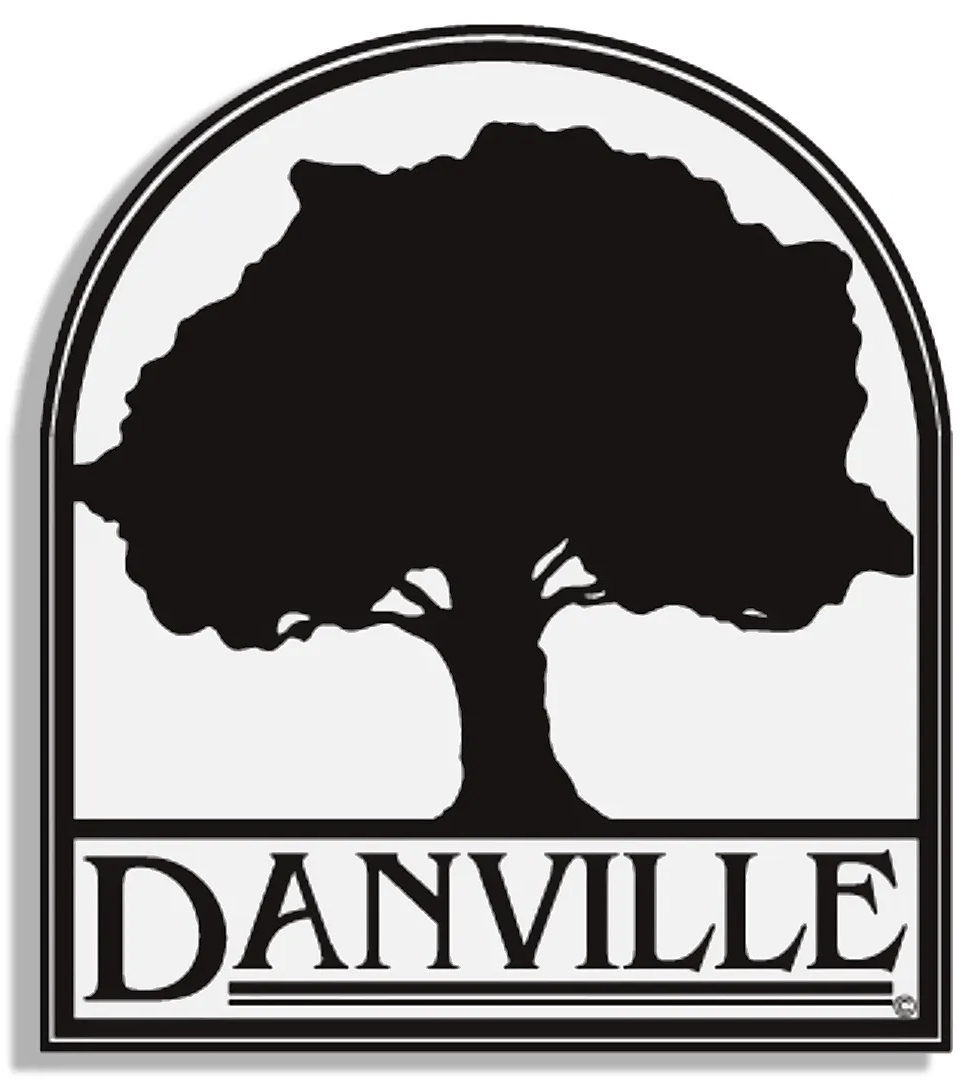
- Seal Logo
- Mottoes: Live Locally "Heart of the San Ramon Valley"
- Interactive map of Danville
- Location in the United States
- Coordinates: 37°49′18″N 122°00′00″W
- Country: United States
- State: California
- County: Contra Costa
- Incorporated: July 1, 1982

Government
  - Mayor: Newell Arnerich
  - State senator: Tim Grayson (D)
  - Assemblymember: Rebecca Bauer-Kahan (D)
  - United States representative: Mark DeSaulnier (D)

Area
  - Total: 18.08 sq mi (46.82 km^{2})
  - Land: 18.08 sq mi (46.82 km^{2})
  - Water: 0 sq mi (0.00 km^{2}) 0%
- Elevation: 358 ft (109 m)

Population (2020)
  - Total: 43,582
  - Density: 2,410.8/sq mi (930.82/km^{2})
- Time zone: UTC-8 (Pacific)
  - Summer (DST): UTC-7 (PDT)
- ZIP codes: 94506, 94526
- Area code: 925
- FIPS code: 06-17988
- GNIS feature IDs: 277497 2412403
- Website: www.danville.ca.gov

Danville (Note: Pronounced /ˈdænvɪl/ DAN-vil) is located in the San Ramon Valley in Contra Costa County, California, United States. It is one of the incorporated municipalities in California that use "town" in their names instead of "city". The population was 43,582 at the 2020 census.

The Iron Horse Regional Trail runs through Danville. It was first a railroad that has been converted to a 10-foot-wide (3.0 m) path that consists of biking and hiking trails as well as controlled intersections. Extending from Livermore to Concord, the trail passes through Danville.

Danville is also home to the Eugene O'Neill National Historic Site, Village Theatre and Art Gallery, and The Museum of the San Ramon Valley.

== History ==
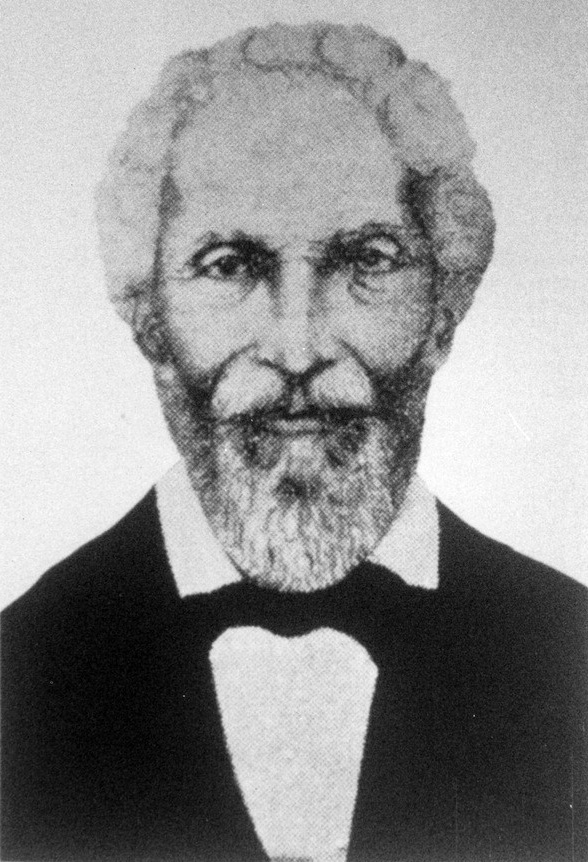
Danville was originally part of Rancho San Ramón, granted in 1834 to José María Amador, a notable Californio miner and ranchero.

Often referred to as the "Heart of the San Ramon Valley", Danville was first populated by Native Americans who lived near creeks and camped on Mount Diablo in the summer. Later, it was part of Mission San José's grazing land as well as a Mexican land grant called Rancho San Ramon.

Initially a farming community, the Town of Danville switched from wheat to fruits and nuts after the Southern Pacific Railroad built a spur line through the area in 1891. It developed as a residential suburb in 1947 when the first sizable housing tracts were constructed and its population boomed in the 1970s and 1980s.

The Danville Post Office opened in 1860 with hotel owner Henry W. Harris as the first postmaster.

Churches, schools, farmers unions and fraternal lodges began as the community grew. The Union Academy, a private high school begun by the Cumberland Presbyterian Church, served the county from 1859 to 1868, until it burned down. Danville Presbyterian Church was dedicated in 1875.

Many early Danville buildings remain standing today. The original 1874 Grange Hall exists as well, and the original Danville Hotel remains downtown which was last renovated in 2016. Many of the early pioneer names appear on the streets and schools, including Baldwin, Harlan, Wood, Love, Hemme, Boone, Bettencourt and Meese.

When the Southern Pacific Railroad came to the Valley in 1891, Danville continued to grow. Farmers built warehouses and shipped crops by rail, and residents were able to travel to and from Danville.

John Hartz sold 8.65 acres (3.50 ha) of his land for the Danville Depot and granted land access to the station. He then subdivided and sold lots east of the station, shifting the town's focus from Front Street to Hartz Avenue. Eventually, a bank, drug store, saloon, doctor's office and Chinese laundry joined the houses lining the street. The Danville Hotel originally sat across from the station and was moved to face Hartz Avenue in 1927.

The twentieth century found Danville affected by the wars, the Spanish flu, the depression, and new immigrants.

In 1910, a public high school district was organized and San Ramon Valley Union High School was built. A library opened in 1913 with 104 books. St. Isidore's Catholic Church was first established in 1910. An Improvement League funded the first streetlights and paved roads in 1915.

Danville continued as farm country into the 1940s. The Valley had a population of 2,120 people in 1940, growing to 4,630 by 1950. Developments such as Montair and Cameo Acres were built, the water and sewer districts extended their boundaries, and the new I-680 freeway which cut through Danville in the mid-1960.

In 1982, Danville citizens voted to incorporate their community.

In 2000, Danville's population reached 40,484.

== Geography ==
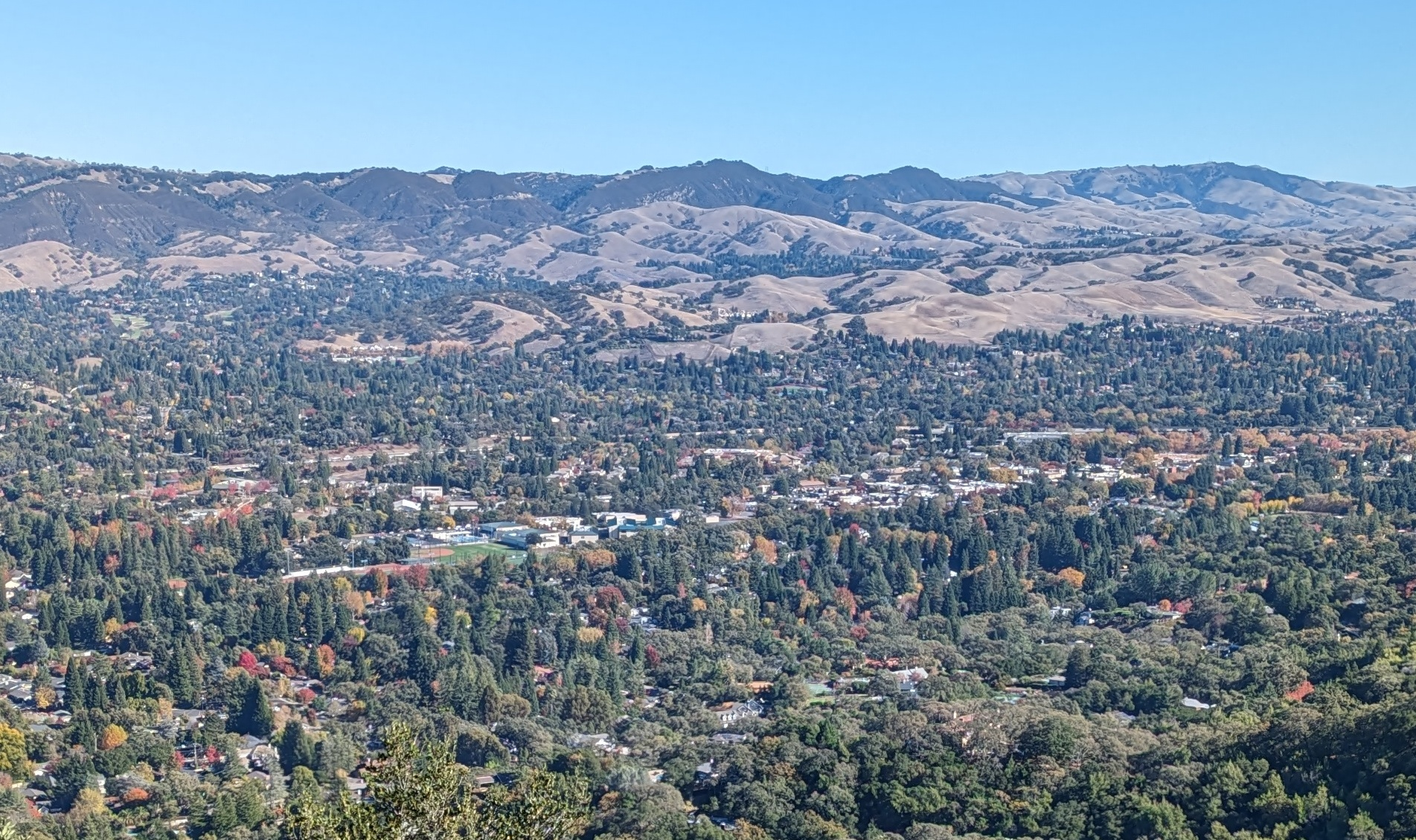
Danville photographed from Las Trampas Regional Wilderness, with the foothills of Mount Diablo in the background

Danville is set in a narrow section of the San Ramon Valley with the Las Trampas Ridge to the west and the Diablo Range to the east. The most prominent landmark of Danville is the backdrop of Mount Diablo, which stands to the east at 3,849 feet (1,173 m) and provides a picturesque backdrop for Danville and neighboring towns and cities. Sycamore Creek drains some of the Mount Diablo slopes and flows through Danville.

To the north of Danville, the unincorporated town of Alamo sits in the uppermost reaches of the San Ramon Valley and extends into the surrounding hills. San Ramon, another affluent suburb, borders Danville to the south.

Interstate 680, extending along the valley to the north and south, is the main route used by traffic in and out of town. Camino Tassajara is the main thoroughfare for east–west travel, most importantly to reach the eastern subdivisions far from the interstate. Camino Tassajara also provides access to the wealthy gated community of Blackhawk.

According to the United States Census Bureau, the town has a total area of 18.1 square miles (47 km^{2}), all land.

=== Climate ===
Danville's weather typifies a Mediterranean climate. Summers are long, with hot days and cool nights. Winters are cool, with mild daytime temperatures usually in the 50s, and nighttime temperatures usually above freezing. Like in the rest of the Bay Area, summers in Danville are extremely dry, and it's not uncommon for four to six months to elapse between the last drop of rain in the spring and the first rain in the fall. Winters are rainy, but periods of several days to a week of mild, dry, sunny weather are quite common even in midwinter.

Climate data for Danville, California (1981–2010 normals)
Month	Jan	Feb	Mar	Apr	May	Jun	Jul	Aug	Sep	Oct	Nov	Dec	Year
Mean daily maximum °F (°C)	55.8 (13.2)	60.4 (15.8)	64.7 (18.2)	69.4 (20.8)	74.3 (23.5)	79.5 (26.4)	84.6 (29.2)	84.1 (28.9)	81.5 (27.5)	74.6 (23.7)	64.5 (18.1)	56.3 (13.5)	70.8 (21.6)
Daily mean °F (°C)	47.5 (8.6)	51.2 (10.7)	54.2 (12.3)	57.5 (14.2)	62.0 (16.7)	66.6 (19.2)	70.2 (21.2)	70.1 (21.2)	68.3 (20.2)	62.5 (16.9)	54.2 (12.3)	47.9 (8.8)	59.3 (15.2)
Mean daily minimum °F (°C)	39.2 (4.0)	41.9 (5.5)	43.6 (6.4)	45.4 (7.4)	49.7 (9.8)	53.6 (12.0)	55.9 (13.3)	56.1 (13.4)	55.0 (12.8)	50.5 (10.3)	44.0 (6.7)	39.5 (4.2)	47.9 (8.8)
Average precipitation inches (mm)	4.86 (123)	4.90 (124)	3.67 (93)	1.46 (37)	0.88 (22)	0.16 (4.1)	0.03 (0.76)	0.08 (2.0)	0.20 (5.1)	1.28 (33)	3.06 (78)	4.57 (116)	25.14 (639)
Source: PRISM Climate Group

== Demographics ==
Historical population
Census	Pop.	Note	%±
1960	3,585		—
1970	14,059		292.2%
1980	26,446		88.1%
1990	31,306		18.4%
2000	41,715		33.2%
2010	42,039		0.8%
2020	43,582		3.7%
2025 (est.)	43,302	▼	−0.6%
source: U.S. Decennial Census; 1860–1870 1880-1890; 1900 1910 1920; 1930 1940 1950; 1960 1970 1980; 1990 2000 2010; Area reported as Alamo-Danville during the 1970 census, which recorded a population of 14,059. (The two communities of Alamo and Danville were again reported separately in 1980.)

Danville first appeared as an unincorporated place in the 1960 U.S. census; and then in the 1970 U.S. census under the name Alamo-Danville after being joined with the community of Alamo (Alamo had a population of 1,791 in the 1960 Census). The two communities were again separated in the 1980 United States census and both redesignated as census designated places. The community was listed as a city in the 1990 U.S. census.

According to Business Insider, Danville's 94506 is the 14th wealthiest ZIP code in America. Danville is one of the wealthiest suburbs of Oakland and San Francisco. Danville also ranks as the 2nd highest-income place in the United States with a population of at least 40,000. It is home to some of the most expensive real estate in the San Francisco Bay Area and the United States. According to CNN Money, Danville's 94506 also has the fourth highest percentage of six-figure income earners in the nation, with 78% of Danville households having at least a six-figure income.

=== Racial and ethnic composition ===
Danville, California – Racial and ethnic composition Note: the US Census treats Hispanic/Latino as an ethnic category. This table excludes Latinos from the racial categories and assigns them to a separate category. Hispanics/Latinos may be of any race.
Race / Ethnicity (NH = Non-Hispanic)	Pop 2000	Pop 2010	Pop 2020	% 2000	% 2010	% 2020
White alone (NH)	34,618	32,834	29,819	82.99%	78.10%	68.42%
Black or African American alone (NH)	375	355	380	0.90%	0.84%	0.87%
Native American or Alaska Native alone (NH)	66	47	59	0.16%	0.11%	0.14%
Asian alone (NH)	3,722	4,360	6,540	8.92%	10.37%	15.01%
Native Hawaiian or Pacific Islander alone (NH)	46	61	42	0.11%	0.15%	0.10%
Other race alone (NH)	68	110	207	0.16%	0.26%	0.47%
Mixed race or Multiracial (NH)	875	1,393	2,583	2.10%	3.31%	5.93%
Hispanic or Latino (any race)	1,945	2,879	3,952	4.66%	6.85%	9.07%
Total	41,715	42,039	43,582	100.00%	100.00%	100.00%

=== 2020 census ===
As of the 2020 census, Danville had a population of 43,582 and a population density of 2,410.8 inhabitants per square mile (930.8/km^{2}). The median age was 46.0 years. 24.3% of residents were under the age of 18 and 19.7% were 65 years of age or older. For every 100 females, there were 93.5 males, and for every 100 females age 18 and over there were 90.1 males age 18 and over.

The census reported that 99.6% of the population lived in households, 0.3% lived in non-institutionalized group quarters, and 0.2% were institutionalized. 100.0% of residents lived in urban areas, while 0.0% lived in rural areas.

There were 15,630 households, of which 36.8% had children under the age of 18 living in them. Of all households, 67.7% were married-couple households, 3.5% were cohabiting couple households, 9.2% were households with a male householder and no spouse or partner present, and 19.6% were households with a female householder and no spouse or partner present. 17.3% of households were one person, and 10.2% had someone living alone who was 65 years of age or older. The average household size was 2.78. There were 12,362 families (79.1% of all households).

There were 16,101 housing units at an average density of 890.6 units per square mile (343.9 units/km^{2}), of which 15,630 (97.1%) were occupied. Of occupied units, 84.6% were owner-occupied and 15.4% were occupied by renters. Of all housing units, 2.9% were vacant. The homeowner vacancy rate was 0.5% and the rental vacancy rate was 4.7%.

The most common ancestries reported were English (20.4%), German (19.5%), Irish (19.4%), Italian (10.6%), Chinese (7.1%), and Scottish (4.7%).

=== Income and poverty ===
In 2023, the US Census Bureau estimated that the median household income was $223,206, and the per capita income was $102,584. About 2.7% of families and 3.6% of the population were below the poverty line.

=== 2010 census ===
The 2010 United States census reported that Danville had a population of 42,039. The population density was 2,331.9 inhabitants per square mile (900.4/km^{2}). The racial makeup of Danville was 34,942 (83.1%) White, 372 (0.9%) African American, 67 (0.2%) Native American, 4,417 (10.5%) Asian, 68 (0.2%) Pacific Islander, 509 (1.2%) from other races, and 1,664 (4.0%) from two or more races. Hispanic or Latino of any race were 2,879 persons (6.8%).

The Census reported that 41,796 people (99.4% of the population) lived in households, 56 (0.1%) lived in non-institutionalized group quarters, and 187 (0.4%) were institutionalized.

There were 15,420 households, out of which 6,034 (39.1%) had children under the age of 18 living in them, 10,389 (67.4%) were opposite-sex married couples living together, 1,140 (7.4%) had a female householder with no husband present, 449 (2.9%) had a male householder with no wife present. There were 452 (2.9%) unmarried opposite-sex partnerships, and 84 (0.5%) same-sex married couples or partnerships. 2,801 households (18.2%) were made up of individuals, and 1,365 (8.9%) had someone living alone who was 65 years of age or older. The average household size was 2.71. There were 11,978 families (77.7% of all households); the average family size was 3.10.

The population was spread out, with 11,196 people (26.6%) under the age of 18, 2,117 people (5.0%) aged 18 to 24, 8,050 people (19.1%) aged 25 to 44, 14,628 people (34.8%) aged 45 to 64, and 6,048 people (14.4%) who were 65 years of age or older. The median age was 44.5 years. For every 100 females, there were 93.5 males. For every 100 females age 18 and over, there were 90.3 males.

There were 15,934 housing units at an average density of 883.8 units per square mile (341.2 units/km^{2}), of which 15,420 were occupied, of which 13,020 (84.4%) were owner-occupied, and 2,400 (15.6%) were occupied by renters. The homeowner vacancy rate was 0.8%; the rental vacancy rate was 5.3%. 36,137 people (86.0% of the population) lived in owner-occupied housing units and 5,659 people (13.5%) lived in rental housing units.

== Arts and culture ==
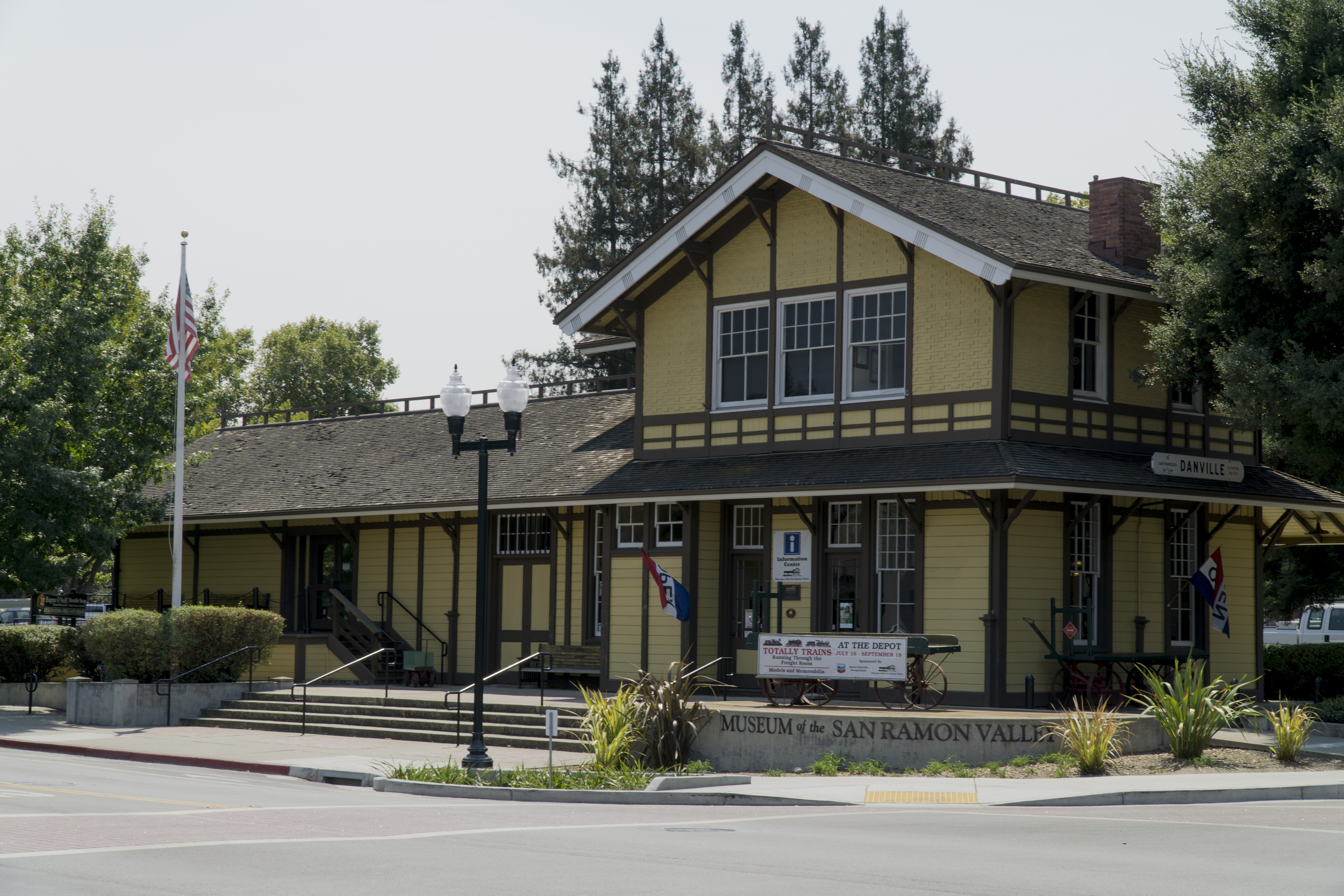
Museum of the San Ramon Valley

=== Museums and historic sites ===
- Eugene O'Neill National Historic Site – Tao House.
- Museum of the San Ramon Valley (located in the restored 1891 Southern Pacific depot)
- Blackhawk Museum
- All Wars Memorial (located in Oak Hill Park – est. 2005)
- Veterans Memorial Building of San Ramon Valley

=== Libraries ===
The Danville Library of the Contra Costa County Library is located in Danville. It is one of the busiest libraries in Contra Costa County by circulation.

=== Seasonal events ===
- The Kiwanis Fourth of July parade attracts over 40,000 people each year.
- The Devil Mountain Run takes place each year in March and is a 10k/5k/1-mile organized run starting in the Downtown area of Danville.
- Hot Summer Sundays Car Shows, which is held on Hartz Avenue in Downtown Danville on one Sunday in September, features hundreds of vintage pre-1960s automobiles on display with live music.
- Annual Lighting of the Old Oak Tree (LOOT) of the Danville Oak Tree takes place on Diablo Road each year the Friday after Thanksgiving.

== Parks and recreation ==
- Mount Diablo State Park
- Las Trampas Regional Wilderness
- Front Street Park
- Baldwin School Park
- Danville South Park
- Diablo Vista Park
- Green Valley School Park
- Greenbrook School Park
- Montair School Park
- Oak Hill Park
- Osage Station Park
- Sycamore Valley Park
- Hap Magee Ranch Park
- Bret Hart Park

== Government ==
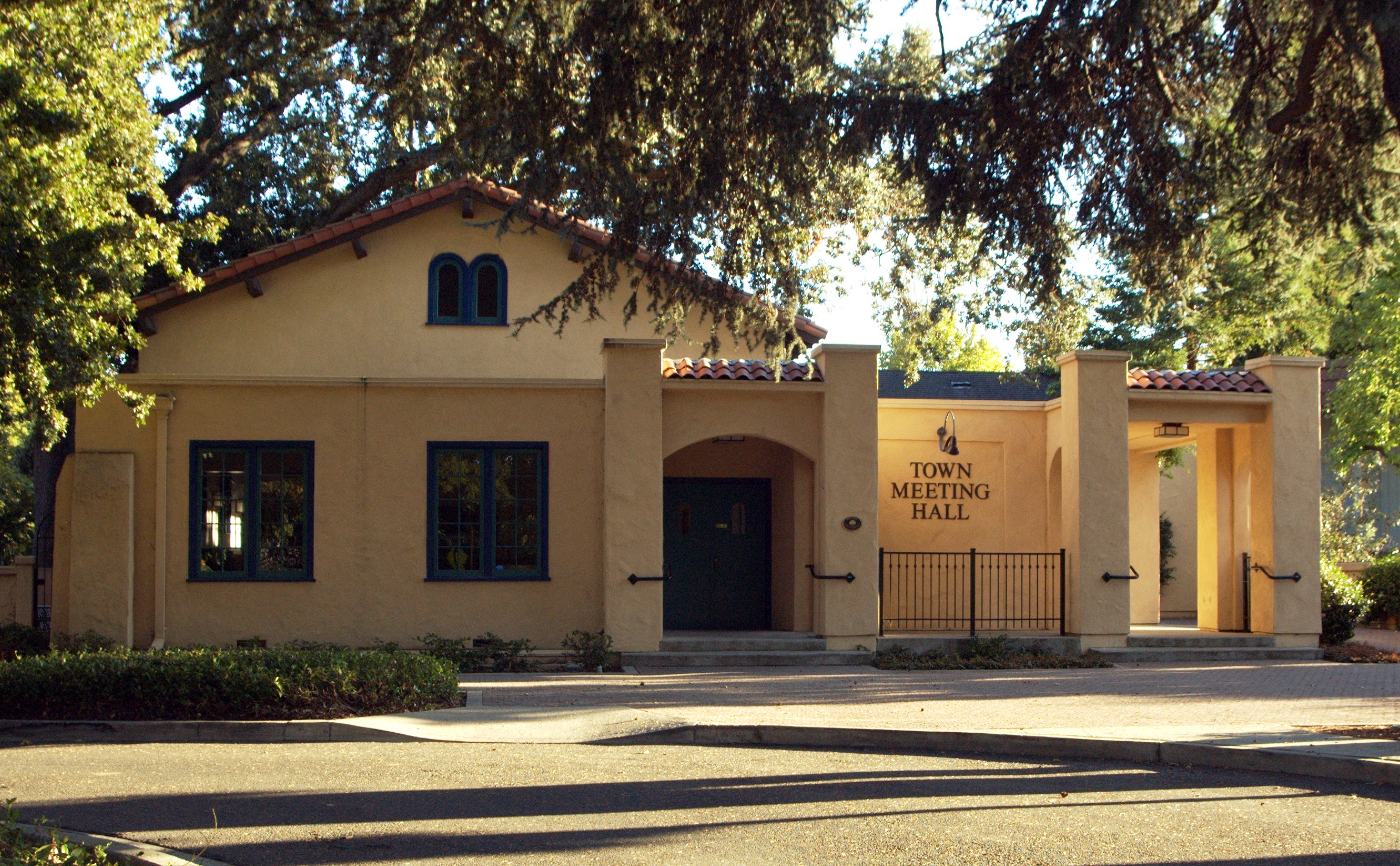
Town Meeting Hall

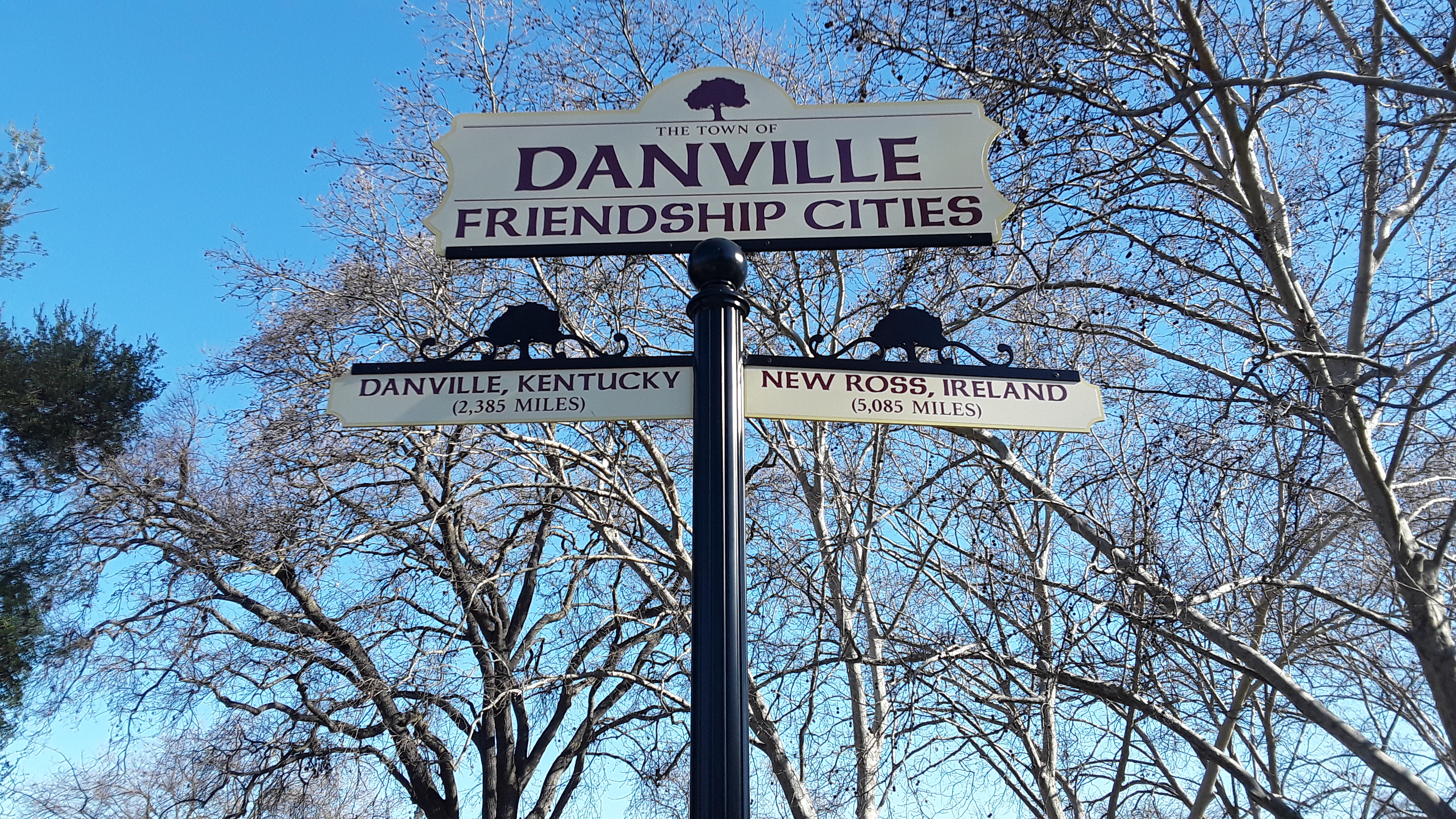
A sign nearby the Danville Library indicating its "friendship cities": Danville, Kentucky, and New Ross, Ireland

According to the California Secretary of State, as of February 10, 2019, Danville has 30,076 registered voters. Of those, 10,412 (34.6%) are registered Democrats, 10,381 (34.5%) are registered Republicans, and 7,963 (26.5%) have declined to state a political party.

Throughout its history until 2008, Danville was a Republican stronghold in presidential elections. Ronald Reagan carried it by a 3-to-1 margin in 1984. However, in 2008, Barack Obama became the first Democrat to carry Danville in a presidential election. He narrowly won it again in 2012 with a plurality. Hillary Clinton carried it in 2016 by nearly 24 points and Joe Biden won it by nearly 29 points in 2020.

The Town of Danville has a Council–manager government, with a five-person Town Council and an appointed Town Manager. Council members' terms are four years. Each year, in December, the council selects a new mayor to take office in January. The current mayor of Danville is Newell Arnerich.

Danville has its own police department (through a contract with the Contra Costa County Office of the Sheriff), which consists of 42 full-time employees, including 30 Officers and 12 civilian support staff. In addition, it has 8 Reserve officers and 32 volunteers.

The San Ramon Valley Fire Protection District (SRVFPD) provides fire protection for Danville. A Special District, it covers 155 square miles includes the following communities: Alamo, Blackhawk, Diablo, the City of San Ramon, the southern boundary of Morgan Territory and the Tassajara Valley, all located in Contra Costa County.

Danville vote by party in presidential elections
Year	Democratic	Republican
2024	61.7% 16,421	35.0% 9,306
2020	63.4% 18,297	34.6% 9,993
2016	58.8% 13,969	35.2% 8,360
2012	49.9% 11,870	48.4% 11,521
2008	55.3% 13,628	43.6% 10,744
2004	47.2% 11,106	52.0% 12,235
2000	43.6% 9,543	53.6% 11,734
1996	40.6% 8,210	52.2% 10,551
1992	33.8% 6,591	43.8% 8,540
1988	31.4% 4,887	67.7% 10,538
1984	23.8% 3,505	75.3% 11,080

== Education ==
=== Public schools ===
All of Danville is within the San Ramon Valley Unified School District.

- (John) Baldwin Elementary School
- Del Amigo High (Continuation)
- Diablo Vista Middle School
- Creekside Elementary School
- Green Valley Elementary School
- Greenbrook Elementary School
- Los Cerros Middle School
- Montair Elementary School
- Monte Vista High School
- Sycamore Valley Elementary School
- Tassajara Hills Elementary School
- Vista Grande Elementary School
- Charlotte Wood Middle School
- San Ramon Valley High School

=== Private schools ===
- San Ramon Valley Christian Academy (Christian)
- St. Isidore's School (Roman Catholic)
- The Athenian School (non-denominational)
- Danville Montessori School

== Notable people ==
- Angelina Anderson – soccer player
- Larry Allen – football player, 14-year NFL career, member of Super Bowl XXX champion Dallas Cowboys
- Alissa Anderegg – Miss World America 2020
- Billy Beane – Major League Baseball outfielder, front office executive for the Oakland Athletics, subject of the book and film Moneyball
- Doug Bowser – businessman, former president of Nintendo of America
- D'Arcy Carden – actress, The Good Place
- Leroy Chiao – astronaut
- Kyle Colonna – soccer player
- E-40 – rapper; lives in Danville
- Ellise – singer, musician
- Zach Ertz – tight end for NFL's Arizona Cardinals; attended Monte Vista High School
- Draymond Green – power forward for NBA's Golden State Warriors
- Jake Haener – NFL quarterback; attended Monte Vista High School
- Kyle Harrison – Major League Baseball pitcher for the Milwaukee Brewers
- Dallas Jaye – soccer player who has played professionally in the United Soccer League
- George Komsky – Ukrainian-born tenor
- Duane Kuiper – Major League Baseball second baseman and broadcaster for the San Francisco Giants
- Nate Landman – NFL linebacker; attended Monte Vista High School
- Jason Lucash – inventor of Origaudio
- Corey Luciano – NFL offensive lineman; attended Monte Vista High School
- Mark Madsen – NBA player and coach; attended San Ramon Valley High School
- Judah Miller – screenwriter and producer
- Murray Miller – screenwriter and producer
- Joe Morgan – Baseball Hall of Fame second baseman
- Sara Jane Moore – attempted to assassinate President Gerald Ford
- Bob Myers – general manager of NBA champion Golden State Warriors; born in Danville
- Vince Neil – vocalist of Mötley Crüe
- Jeff Newman – MLB All-Star baseball catcher and manager
- Evan O'Dorney – winner of 80th Scripps National Spelling Bee in 2007
- Eugene O'Neill – only Nobel Prize-winning American playwright; wrote the three plays now generally considered his best work while living at Tao House (now the Eugene O'Neill National Historic Site) between 1937 and 1944
- Greg Papa – broadcaster for San Francisco 49ers
- A. J. Puckett – baseball pitcher for Chicago White Sox; born in Danville
- Marchmont Schwartz (1909–1991) – college football player and coach; inducted into the College Football Hall of Fame as a player.
- Nate Schierholtz – baseball player; attended San Ramon Valley High School
- Adam Schiff – U.S. Senator; attended Monte Vista High School
- Russell Simpson – actor
- Greg Sestero – actor; attended Monte Vista High School
- Gale Storm – actress, singer, died in a Danville convalescent home
- Chesley B. "Sully" Sullenberger – pilot of US Airways Flight 1549 who made an emergency water landing in the Hudson River and is credited with saving the lives of all 155 crew and passengers
- Nancy Tellem (born 1952) – chief media officer and executive chairwoman of Eko
- Mark Tollefsen (born 1992) – basketball player, 2018–19 top scorer in the Israel Basketball Premier League
- Christy Turlington – supermodel; attended Monte Vista High School
- Dana Vollmer – Olympic swimmer, 2004, 2012 and 2016 gold medalist
- Joey Wagman – baseball pitcher
- Andre Ward – professional boxer
- Josh White – MLB pitcher 2026–present; attended Monte Vista High School
- Randy Winn – MLB outfielder 1998–2010; attended San Ramon Valley High School
- Chris Wondolowski – soccer player for San Jose Earthquakes and United States men's national soccer team; born in Danville and MLS top scorer
- Kevin Woo – vocalist for band U-KISS; born in Danville
- David Zuckerman – writer, producer of Family Guy; born in Danville
