= Origaudio =

American company

The OrigAudio logo

OrigAudio is a consumer audio company launched by Jason Lucash and Mike Szymczak. Their products include "Fold n' Play", foldable speakers made from recycled materials and utilizing the Japanese art of origami to fold and unfold.

== Product design ==
OrigAudio product "Rock-It" utilizes vibration sequences to turn any object into a speaker. The product was launched in January 2010 at the Consumer Electronics Show in Las Vegas. The product was featured on the New York Post's list of top gadgets to look for in 2010.

The company's product "Doodle" allows consumers to design the graphics on their own speaker. Users can upload their own photograph, logo or artwork and the company will customize the speaker.

== Trivia ==
OrigAudio was featured on the second season of ABC's show, Shark Tank, where they were offered an investment from millionaire Robert Herjavec. By the time the episode had aired, the company's valuation had doubled and the owners declined the offer.

== Business awards ==
In January 2013, Lucash was named Entrepreneur magazine's "Emerging Entrepreneur of the Year" and more recently the company was named to Inc. magazine's prestigious "500 Fastest Growing Companies in America" list.

Most recently in September 2018, Origaudio was acquired by Hub Promotional Group based out of Braintree, Massachusetts. Financial terms of the deal were not disclosed and in addition to the acquisition, Lucash became Senior Vice President of Marketing and Product for HUB, while Szymczak added responsibility of Vice President of Business Development for HUB.
