= Dan Savage bibliography =

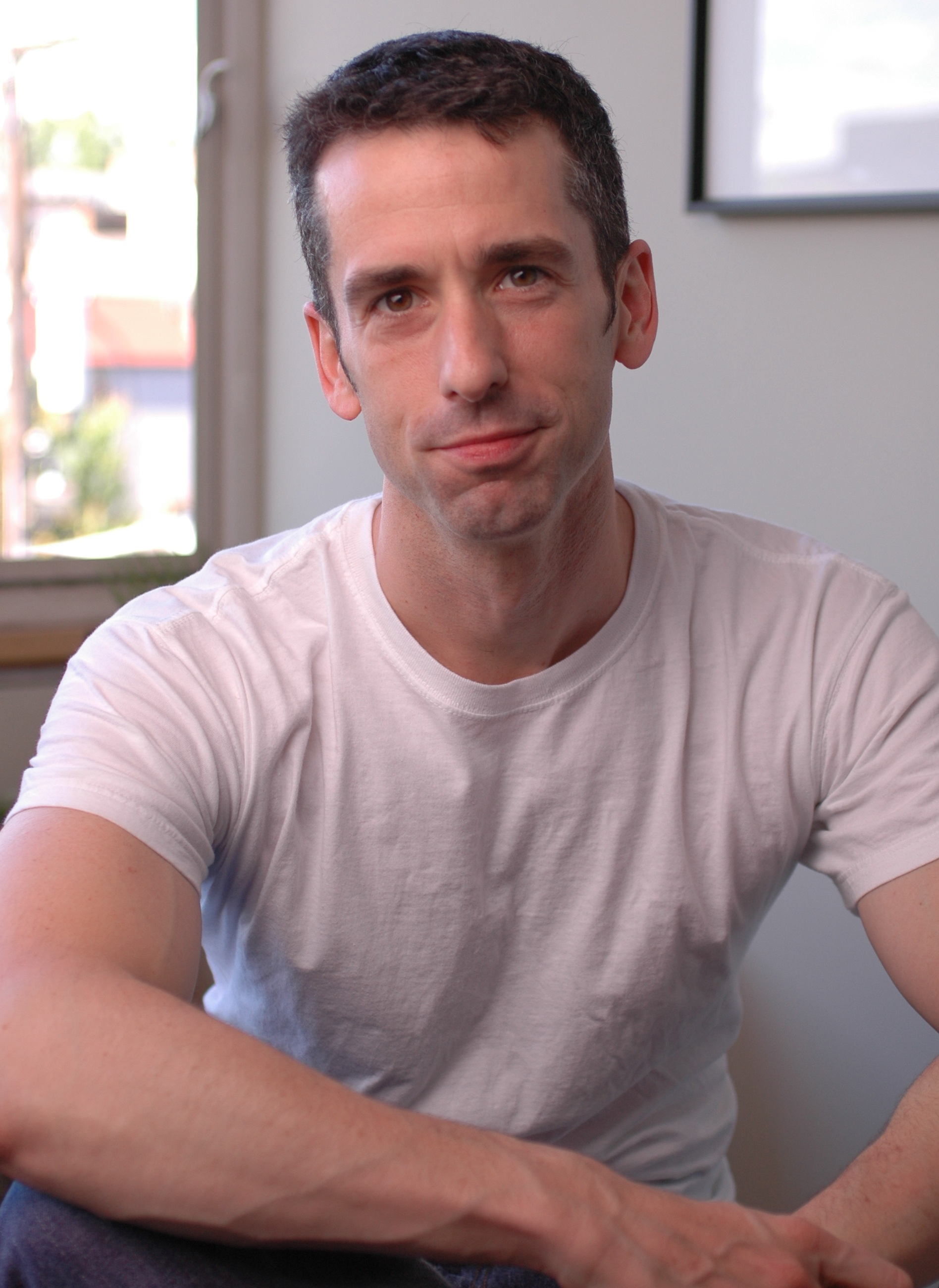
- Savage in 2005
- Books↙: 6
- Articles↙: 19
- Books edited↙: 1
- Newspapers edited↙: 1
- Advice column↙: 1
- Contributor in books↙: 12
- Television↙: 4
- Theatre↙: 13

American author Dan Savage (born October 7, 1964) has written six books, op-ed pieces in The New York Times, and an advice column on sexual issues in The Stranger (an alternative newspaper from Seattle, Washington). A graduate of the University of Illinois at Urbana–Champaign, Savage began contributing a column, Savage Love, to The Stranger from its inception in 1991. By 1998 his column had a readership of four million. He was associate editor at the newspaper from 1991 to 2001, when he became its editor-in-chief, later becoming its editorial director in 2007.

Savage's books have had successful sales results and have been generally well received. Savage Love: Straight Answers from America's Most Popular Sex Columnist was published in 1998 and features selections from his advice column. His next book The Kid: What Happened After My Boyfriend and I Decided to Go Get Pregnant was published in 1999, and recounts his experiences with his boyfriend whilst deciding to adopt a child. The book received a PEN West Award for Excellence in Creative Nonfiction, and an Off-Broadway musical based on the work was the recipient of the BMI Foundation Jerry Bock Award for Excellence in Musical Theatre. Skipping Towards Gomorrah: The Seven Deadly Sins and the Pursuit of Happiness in America, published in 2002, describes the author's experiences indulging in the seven deadly sins. The book was featured in The Best American Sex Writing 2004, and won a Lambda Literary Award.

Savage's 2005 book The Commitment: Love, Sex, Marriage, and My Family, recounting his personal experience deciding to marry his partner Terry Miller and analyzing same-sex marriage, reached The New York Times Best Seller list, and Nielsen BookScan noted it sold approximately 300,000 copies. After founding the It Gets Better Project in 2010 to reach out to teenagers after incidents of suicide among LGBT youth, his edited compilation of submissions It Gets Better: Coming Out, Overcoming Bullying, and Creating a Life Worth Living was published in 2011. The book features notable contributors, including David Sedaris, Hillary Clinton, and Barack Obama. Sales of the book were successful, and IndieBound reported it reached a list of best-sellers in the United States less than one week after publication. It reached 16th on The New York Times Best Seller list in April 2011. Savage collaborated with Lindy West, Christopher Frizzelle, and Bethany Jean Clement on a college guide, How to Be a Person, which was published in 2012. His 2013 book American Savage reflects on Savage's experiences throughout the founding of the It Gets Better Project and was well received by The Washington Post and the Seattle Post-Intelligencer.

== Works ==
=== Books ===
==== Author ====
Year	Title	Identifiers	Publisher	Notes
1998	Savage Love: Straight Answers from America's Most Popular Sex Columnist	ISBN 978-0-452-27815-8; LCCN 98-20611; OCLC 39157512	Plume	Savage Love includes pieces from the author's sex advice column of the same name. The book received a favorable reception in reviews from Library Journal, Mademoiselle, POZ, and Gay and Lesbian Humanist.
1999	The Kid: What Happened After My Boyfriend and I Decided to Go Get Pregnant	ISBN 978-0-525-94525-3; LCCN 99-32506; OCLC 41445757	Dutton	The Kid delves into the machinations involved in the process of adopting an infant boy, through the experiences of the author and his boyfriend. The Kid is the recipient of a PEN West Award, for Excellence in Creative Nonfiction. The book was adapted into a musical in 2010 by librettist Michael Zam, with music composed by Andy Monroe, and lyrics by Jack Lechner. It was performed Off-Broadway in Theatre Row, New York City; directed by Scott Elliott. The play was the recipient of the BMI Foundation Jerry Bock Award for Excellence in Musical Theatre in 2009.
2002	Skipping Towards Gomorrah: The Seven Deadly Sins and the Pursuit of Happiness in America	ISBN 978-0-452-28416-6; LCCN 2002-21252; OCLC 49421653	Dutton	The book's title is a reference to Robert Bork's 1996 book, Slouching Towards Gomorrah. Skipping Towards Gomorrah examines the concept of happiness in American culture, as obtained by indulging in each of the Seven Deadly Sins. Skipping Towards Gomorrah was selected for inclusion in The Best American Sex Writing 2004, and won a Lambda Literary Award in 2003.
2005	The Commitment: Love, Sex, Marriage, and My Family	ISBN 978-0-525-94907-7; LCCN 2006-297911; OCLC 61492912	Dutton	The Commitment recounts the author's experiences along with his partner, Terry Miller, as they debate getting married after spending 10 years in a relationship together. The book reached The New York Times Best Seller list one month after it was published, and saw successful sales with independent bookstores. The Washington Post reported that according to Nielsen BookScan, approximately 300,000 copies of the book were sold.
2012	How to Be a Person: The Stranger's Guide to College, Sex, Intoxicants, Tacos, and Life Itself	ISBN 978-1-57061-778-2; LCCN 2012-11132; OCLC 764336078	Sasquatch Books	How to Be a Person was co-authored with Lindy West, Christopher Frizzelle, Bethany Jean Clement. The book received a favorable review in the New York Post in their "Required Reading" section.
2013	American Savage: Insights, Slights, and Fights on Faith, Sex, Love, and Politics	ISBN 978-0-525-95410-1	Dutton	American Savage is a collection of essays that reflect on the author's experiences during the years prior to the book's publication, including the founding of the It Gets Better Project with his husband. The book received a positive reception from Chandler Burr of The Washington Post, the Seattle Post-Intelligencer, Entertainment Weekly, and The A.V. Club; while Reason criticized the book for being disorganized.

==== Editor ====
Year	Title	Identifiers	Publisher	Notes
2011	It Gets Better: Coming Out, Overcoming Bullying, and Creating a Life Worth Living	ISBN 978-0-525-95233-6; LCCN 2011-283060; OCLC 690088227	Dutton	Savage started the It Gets Better Project in September 2010 to address incidents of suicide among LGBT youth. It Gets Better: Coming Out, Overcoming Bullying, and Creating a Life Worth Living contains selections of writings addressed to teenagers within the LGBT community. Celebrities, ordinary individuals and teenagers submitted pieces for inclusion in the book, which includes over 100 essays, selected from 10,000 entries.

==== Contributor ====
Year	Author	Title	Identifiers	Publisher	Contribution
2000	Noelle Howey; Ellen Samuels	Out of the Ordinary: Essays on Growing Up with Gay, Lesbian, and Transgender Parents	ISBN 978-0-312-24489-7; LCCN 00-25493; OCLC 43540186	St. Martin's Press	Preface
2001	Ariel Gore; Bee Lavender	Breeder: Real-Life Stories from the New Generation of Mothers	ISBN 978-1-58005-051-7; LCCN 00-54914; OCLC 45636941	Seal Press	Foreword
2004	Daniel O'Connor	The Best American Sex Writing 2004	ISBN 978-1-56025-598-7; LCCN 2005-205773; OCLC 57047561	Running Press	Featured selection: Skipping Towards Gomorrah
2004	Kathy Pories	The "M" Word: Writers on Same-Sex Marriage	ISBN 978-1-56512-454-7; LCCN 2004-54571; OCLC 55887361	Algonquin Books	Essay: "Double Standards"
2006	Pamela Kruger; Jill Smolowe	A Love Like No Other: Stories from Adoptive Parents	ISBN 978-1-59448-215-1; LCCN 2005-42140; OCLC 57625643	Riverhead Trade	Chapter: "Living with a Very Open Adoption"
2007	Daniel Jones	Modern Love: 50 True and Extraordinary Tales of Desire, Deceit, and Devotion	ISBN 978-0-307-35104-3; LCCN 2006-29412; OCLC 71350359	Three Rivers Press	Chapter: "DJ's Homeless Mommy"
2007	Lloyd Dangle	Troubletown Told You So: Comics that Could've Saved Us from this Mess	ISBN 978-0-9723544-1-7; OCLC 154800614	Troubletown Books	Introduction
2008	Annie Knepler; Ellie Knepler, Myrna Knepler	Crossing Cultures: Readings for Composition	ISBN 978-0-618-91806-5; OCLC 141385491; LCCN 2006-26289	Cengage	Chapter: "Role Reversal"
2008	Ben Karlin	Things I've Learned from Women Who've Dumped Me	ISBN 978-0-446-58069-4; LCCN 2007-37697; OCLC 154698729	Grand Central Publishing	Chapter: "I am a Gay Man"; "Lesson #14"
2009	Rebecca Walker	One Big Happy Family: 18 Writers Talk About Polyamory, Open Adoption, Mixed Marriage, Househusbandry, Single Motherhood, and Other Realities of Truly Modern Love	ISBN 978-1-59448-862-7; LCCN 2008-50339; OCLC 233548166	Riverhead Books	Chapter: "The Enemy Within"
2012	Merle Miller	On Being Different: What It Means to Be a Homosexual	ISBN 978-0-14-310696-8; LCCN 2012-23606; OCLC 778419347	Penguin Classics	Foreword
2013	Matt Hern	Stay Solid!: A Radical Handbook for Youth	ISBN 978-1-84935-099-0; OCLC 843174077	AK Press	Contributor: Section "Sex"

=== Newspapers edited ===
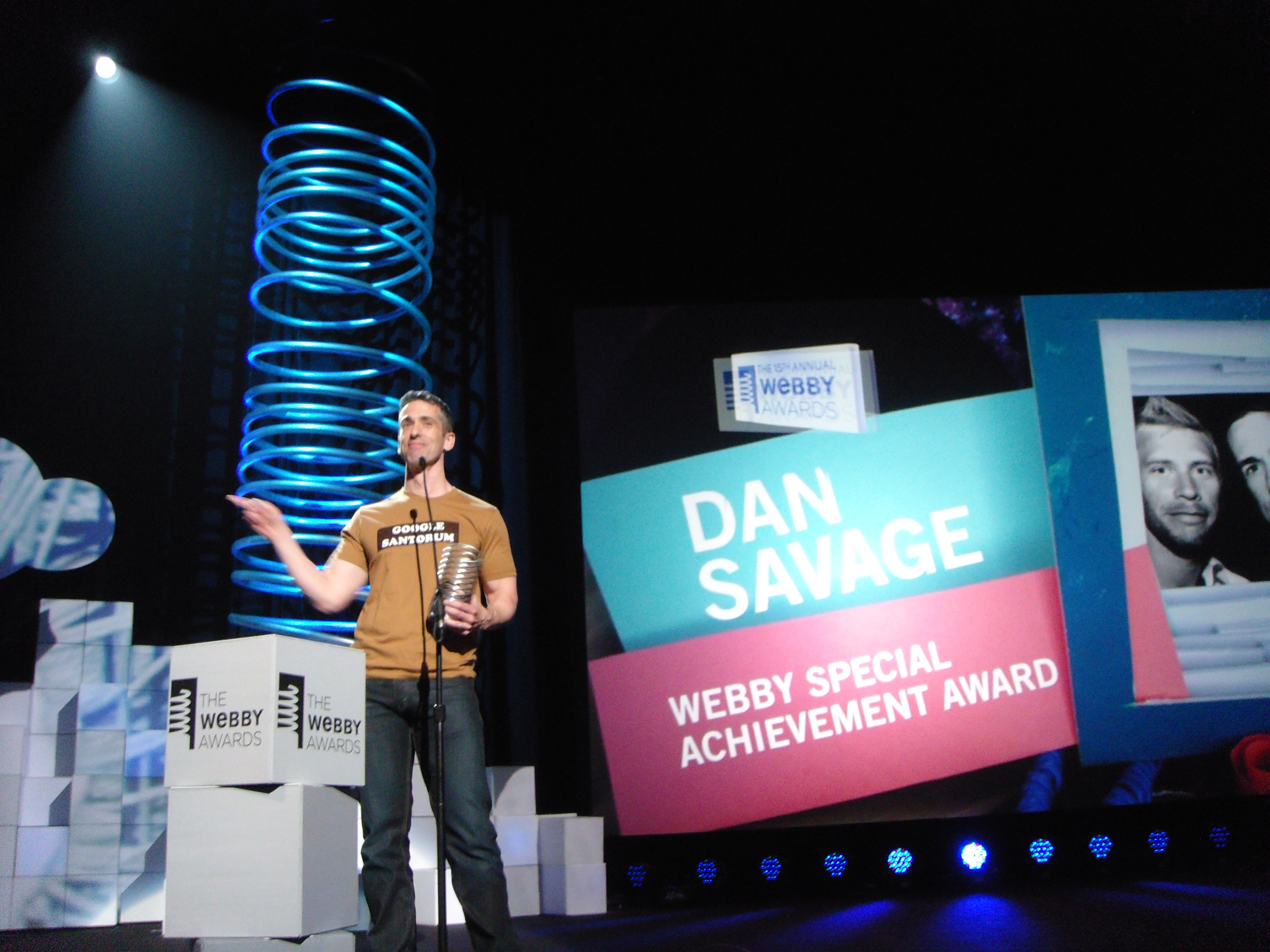
Dan Savage receiving the Webby Award for Special Achievement in 2011

- The Stranger (Seattle, Washington: Tim Keck; Index Newspapers, LLC). ISSN 1935-9004.
  - Savage served as associate editor from 1991 to April 4, 2001, when he became editor-in-chief.
  - He became editorial director in September 2007.

=== Advice column ===
- "Savage Love". The Stranger. Seattle, Washington: The Stranger; Tim Keck; Index Newspapers, LLC. ISSN 1935-9004. 1991–present
  - By 1998, Savage's advice column had a total of 4 million readers, and was syndicated to 21 newspapers located in Canada and the United States.

=== Internet ===
President Obama contributed to the It Gets Better Project started by Dan Savage

Logo of the It Gets Better Project started by Savage

- "It Gets Better", part of the It Gets Better Project (YouTube), with Terry Miller (September 21, 2010)
- "American Savage". TakePart TV. YouTube. 2012. Archived from the original on 2016-06-03.

=== Television ===
- This American Life Live!, Bard Entertainment, National CineMedia, with Mike Birbiglia, Ira Glass, Starlee Kine, Joss Whedon (2009)
  - Savage appeared on a live episode of This American Life in 2009, where he criticized the Catholic Church and discussed his views on atheism. He reflected on his experience during his mother's death.
- It Gets Better: MTV Television Special (MTV; MTV Studios). February 21, 2012.
  - It Gets Better was a collaborative project between MTV and the It Gets Better Project. Along with his partner Terry Miller, Savage hosted the episode and informed the audience about three youths and their experiences coming to terms with their LGBT status.
- Savage U (MTV; MTV Studios). 2012.
  - MTV featured Savage in its program Savage U, wherein he traveled to college campuses in the United States to speak about sexuality and answer students' queries. The series premiered on MTV on April 3, 2012.
- It Gets Better 2: MTV Television Special (MTV; MTV Studios). October 9, 2012.
  - It Gets Better 2 was hosted by Savage and featured an examination of LGBT young adults as they dealt with issues surrounding their alternative sexuality.
- The Real O'Neals was a sitcom that aired on ABC from March 2, 2016, to March 14, 2017. The series was loosely based on Savage's early life, and he was also one of the show's executive producers.

=== Theatre ===
- It's a Lon Mabon Christmas Carol, Charlie Brown (1993) — play produced by Greek Active, Seattle, Washington; Dan Savage directed and was credited as Keenan Hollahan. The play was co-written by Charles Smith.
  - Play was performed at the Tugs Belmont in Capitol Hill, Seattle, Washington. It's a Lon Mabon Christmas Carol, Charlie Brown was an LGBT-themed adaptation of A Christmas Carol by Charles Dickens. The play included a satire of activist Lon Mabon, and a parody of A Charlie Brown Christmas. Performances by two actors in the production received recognition by The Seattle Times in the "Footlight Awards".
- The Importance of Being Earnest (1993) — play produced by Greek Active, Seattle, Washington; Dan Savage directed and was credited as Keenan Hollahan.
  - Savage adapted the play from the original by Oscar Wilde. The original play was concurrently being performed at the Intiman Theatre in Seattle, Washington. Savage's adaptation was shown at the Re-Bar Tavern and was billed as the "queer version" of the Intiman Theatre production. The play was styled in the form of a cabaret.
- The Comedy of Errors (1993) — play produced by Greek Active, Seattle, Washington; Dan Savage directed and was credited as Keenan Hollahan.
  - Male actors took the roles of females, and actresses portrayed the male characters in the play.
- Macbeth (1994) — play produced by Greek Active, Seattle, Washington; Dan Savage interpreted and adapted the play from the original William Shakespeare and directed; he was credited as Keenan Hollahan.
  - Savage incorporated gender reversal for the actors cast to portray the male and female roles. The play was successful and its run was extended for an additional month past its intended wrap date.
  - Macbeth as adapted by Savage and produced for Greek Active was performed again in 1996; with Savage as director.
- Mourning Becomes Electra (1994) — play produced by Greek Active, Seattle, Washington; Dan Savage directed and was credited as Keenan Hollahan.
  - Savage adapted the piece from the original play by Eugene O'Neill. He chose to select a slate of only men as actors, and compressed the running time from six hours to two and a half.
- A Christmas Carol (1994) — play produced by Greek Active, Seattle, Washington; Dan Savage directed and was credited as Keenan Hollahan.
  - Savage modified the production to incorporate cross-dressing actors.
- Saint Joan (1995) — play produced by Greek Active, Seattle, Washington; Dan Savage directed and was credited as Keenan Hollahan.
  - Savage adapted the play from the original by George Bernard Shaw; Shaw himself is included as a character in the production, who appears to inspect the set and then is pulled offstage.
  - Winner of the 1995 Seattle Pretty Inclusive Theater (SPIT) Award in the comedy category.
- The Best Man (1996) — play produced by Greek Active, Seattle, Washington; Dan Savage directed and was credited as Keenan Hollahan.
  - Savage adapted the play from the original by Gore Vidal. Male actors performed roles of both men and women characters. Savage updated the play to make to more relevant to ongoing political elections at the time.
- The Children's Hour (1996) — play produced by Greek Active, Seattle, Washington; Dan Savage directed and was credited as Keenan Hollahan.
  - The play was an adaptation of the original by Lillian Hellman. Classmates at an educational institution in the Southern United States were played by lesbian women; drag queen men were cast as the instructors at the school that the students claimed were lesbians.
- Egguus (2001) — play performed at Consolidated Works, Seattle, Washington; Dan Savage wrote and directed the adaptation and was credited as Keenan Hollahan.
  - Egguus was an adaptation by Savage from the 1973 play Equus by Peter Shaffer.

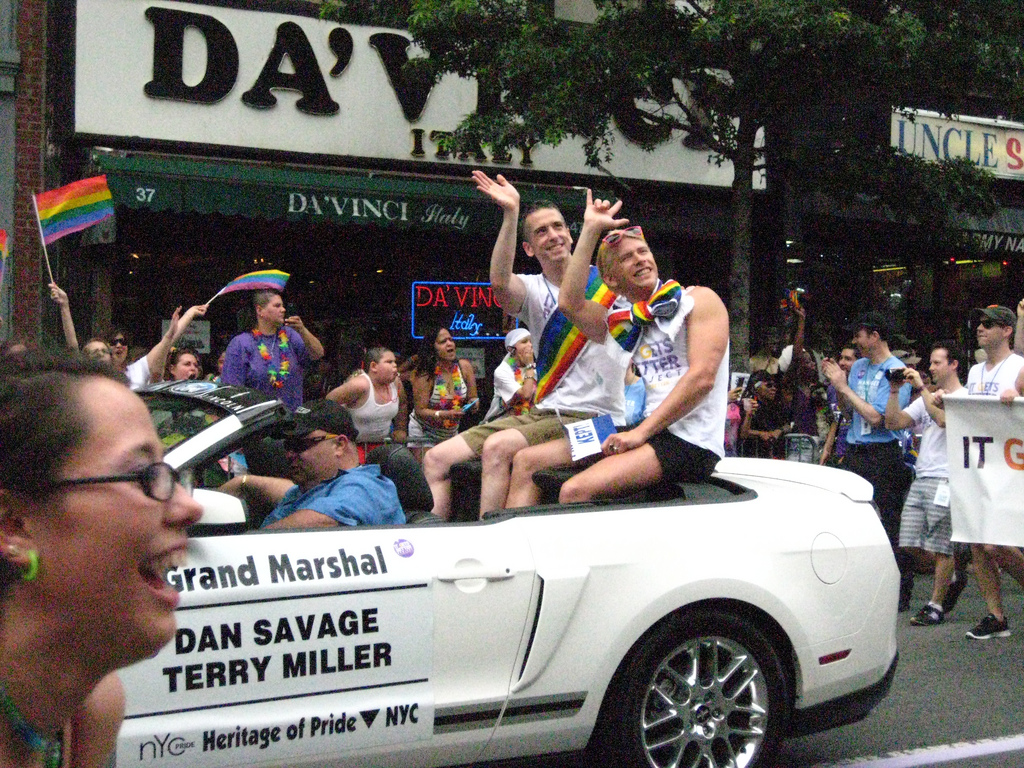
Dan Savage and Terry Miller, Grand Marshals of the 2011 New York City Pride Parade

- The Kid (2010), Michael Zam (book), Andy Monroe (music), Jack Lechner (lyrics). Off-Broadway, Theatre Row, New York City, The New Group.
  - Musical adaptation based on Savage's book The Kid: What Happened After My Boyfriend and I Decided to Go Get Pregnant; Savage gave feedback to the production team during the adaptation process, and provided them with numerous notes and comments. Savage stated in an interview with Time Out New York, that the production team were responsive to his feedback.
  - The Kid was recognized with the 2009 BMI Foundation Jerry Bock Award for Excellence in Musical Theatre, in the category of Best New Musical. Composer Jerry Bock, a Pulitzer Prize and Tony Award recipient, chose the BMI Lehman Engel Musical Theater Workshop-developed musical himself to receive the award. It received nominations in 2011 for five Drama Desk Awards including Outstanding Musical, Outstanding Lyrics, and Outstanding Book of a Musical; in addition to nominations for a Lucille Lortel Award and a GLAAD Media Award. The Kid won the 2011 Outer Critics Circle Award in the category of Outstanding New Off-Broadway Musical.
- Miracle! (2012) written and directed by Dan Savage, performed at Intiman Playhouse, Seattle, Washington.
  - Savage wrote the play as a parody of The Miracle Worker, utilizing drag queen actors.
- It Gets Better Tour (2013). Collaboration between the Gay Men's Chorus of Los Angeles with Dan Savage and others including Lily Tomlin and LeAnn Rimes.

=== Articles ===
==== The Capital Times ====
- Savage, Dan (July 8, 1991). "Doc has not made changes for prisoners with AIDS". The Capital Times. Madison, Wisconsin. p. 7A; Section: Editorial.

==== The New York Times ====
- "Is No Adoption Really Better Than a Gay Adoption?". The New York Times. September 8, 2001. p. 13; Section A; Column 1; Editorial Desk. Archived from the original on March 6, 2016.
- "Across the Great Divide". The New York Times. February 20, 2002. p. 21; Section A; Column 1; Editorial Desk. Archived from the original on January 29, 2018.
- "G.O.P. Hypocrisy". The New York Times. April 25, 2003. p. 31; Section A; Column 2; Editorial Desk. Archived from the original on December 1, 2016.
- "How to Be an Iowan for a Day". The New York Times. January 7, 2004. p. 21; Section A; Column 2; Editorial Desk. Archived from the original on February 21, 2016.
- "The Gay Child Left Behind". The New York Times. February 17, 2005. p. 29; Section A; Column 2; Editorial Desk. Archived from the original on July 4, 2013.
- "DJ's Homeless Mommy". The New York Times. September 11, 2005. p. 1; Section 9; Column 2; Style Desk. Archived from the original on April 8, 2015.
- "Can I Get a Little Privacy?". The New York Times. November 16, 2005. p. 23; Section A; Column 1; Editorial Desk. Archived from the original on March 25, 2012.
- "Don't Let Your Babies Grow Up to Be Ex-Gay Cowboys". The New York Times. February 10, 2006. p. 25; Section A; Column 1; Editorial Desk. Archived from the original on April 17, 2016.
- "Same-Sex Marriage Wins By Losing". The New York Times. July 30, 2006. p. 13; Section 4; Column 1; Editorial Desk. Archived from the original on March 13, 2017.
- "The Code of the Callboy". The New York Times. November 8, 2006. p. 23; Section A; Column 1; Editorial Desk. Archived from the original on February 8, 2017.
- "Anti-Gay, Anti-Family". The New York Times. November 12, 2008. p. 31; Section A; Column 0; Editorial Desk; Op–Ed Contributor. Archived from the original on January 6, 2018.
- "The President's Speech: A Gay Agenda for Everyone". The New York Times. January 23, 2011. p. 12; Section WK; Column 0; Editorial Desk; Op–Ed Contributor. Archived from the original on September 29, 2015.
- "What God Wants". The New York Times. April 14, 2013. p. BR1; Sunday Book Review. Archived from the original on December 30, 2016.

==== Seattle Post-Intelligencer ====
- "Gays, lesbians can't have heroes (Degeneres) without monsters (Cunanan)". Seattle Post-Intelligencer. July 27, 1997. p. E3; Section: Editorial.
- "Merged charities will mean more money for AIDS". Seattle Post-Intelligencer. February 3, 1998. p. A7; Section: Editorial.
- "Send AIDS money to Africa – One Seattle-area gay group's funding is increasingly hard to justify". Seattle Post-Intelligencer. July 28, 2000. p. B11; Section: Editorial.

==== Slate magazine ====
- "The Magazine Article That Changed Everything for Gay People". Slate magazine. The Slate Group, LLC. October 5, 2012. Archived from the original on October 9, 2012.

==== Wisconsin State Journal ====
- "More on inmate death". Wisconsin State Journal. Madison, Wisconsin. July 12, 1991. p. 11A; Section: Opinion.

== Awards ==
Year	Award	Work	Organization	Result	References
1995	Seattle Pretty Inclusive Theater (SPIT) Award	Saint Joan, play produced by Greek Active	The Stranger	Won	
1999	PEN West Award for Excellence in Creative Nonfiction	The Kid: What Happened After My Boyfriend and I Decided to Go Get Pregnant	PEN Center USA	Won	
2003	Lambda Literary Award	Skipping Towards Gomorrah: The Seven Deadly Sins and the Pursuit of Happiness in America	Lambda Literary Foundation	Won	
2004	The Best American Sex Writing 2004	Skipping Towards Gomorrah: The Seven Deadly Sins and the Pursuit of Happiness in America	Running Press	Featured selection	
2010	Mashable Award	It Gets Better Project, social web personality	Mashable Inc.	Nominated	
2011	Webby Award for Special Achievement	It Gets Better Project	International Academy of Digital Arts and Sciences	Won	
2011	Anthony Giffard "Make the Change" Award	It Gets Better Project	Master of Communication in Digital Media program, University of Washington	Won	
2012	Emmy Governors Award	It Gets Better Project	Academy of Television Arts & Sciences Board of Governors (ATAS)	Won	
2012	Emmy Award (Category: Outstanding Children's Nonfiction, Reality or Reality-Competition Program)	It Gets Better: Television Special, MTV	ATAS/NATAS	Nominated	
2013	Bonham Centre Award	It Gets Better Project	The Mark S. Bonham Centre for Sexual Diversity Studies at the University of Toronto	Won	
2013	Humanist of the Year	Body of writing, activism for separation of church and state, and support for LGBT youth	American Humanist Association	Won	
2014	Readers' Choice Award	Body of writing, It Gets Better Project, It Gets Better specials	Out magazine	Nominated	

== See also ==
- Gay literature
- LGBT social movements
- List of LGBT writers
