= It Gets Better (disambiguation) =

It Gets Better is an American not-for-profit organisation which provides support for LGBT youth.

It Gets Better may also refer to:

- It Gets Better (book), by Dan Savage and Terry Miller
- "It Gets Better", a song by Keith Sweat from his 1994 album Get Up on It
- "It Gets Better", a 2010 song by Todrick Hall
- "It Gets Better", a song by Fun from their 2012 album Some Nights
- "It Gets Better", a season four episode of Arrested Development
- "It Gets Better", a song by the Preatures from their 2014 album Blue Planet Eyes
- "It Gets Better", a song by Lenka from her 2015 album The Bright Side
- "It Gets Better", a song by Rex Orange County from his 2019 album Pony
- "It Gets Better", a 2020 song by Salem Ilese
- "It Gets Better" (song), a 2021 song by Swedish House Mafia
