= Twana (given name) =

Twana or Twanna is a given name. Notable people with the name include:

- Twana Barnett, American reality television star
- Twana Khalid Ahmed, Iraqi football referee
- Twanna Hines (born 1975), American writer and internet personality

== See also ==
- Tawana (disambiguation)
