= Katherine Taylor =

Katherine Taylor may refer to:

- Katherine Taylor (artist) (born 1974), American artist and sculptor
- Katherine Haviland Taylor (1891–1941), American novelist, playwright, and screenwriter
- Kay Glasson Taylor (1893–1998), Australian novelist
- Katharine Whiteside Taylor (1897–1989), American author and educator
- Kathrine Taylor (1903–1996), American writer

== See also ==
- Catherine Taylor (disambiguation)
