= Anka Radakovich =

American author and columnist

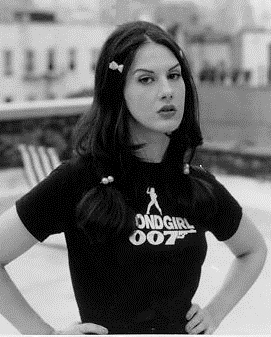
- Radakovich in 1994
- Occupations: Author, columnist
- Website: ankagirl.com

Anka Radakovich (born 1957) is an American author and columnist, self-described as the first modern sex columnist through her column in Details magazine, which ran from 1990 to 1999.

== Early life ==
Radakovich is of Serbian descent, the daughter of a corporate executive and a former opera singer. She grew up and attended North High School in Hagerstown, Maryland, and after studying literature and fine arts at the University of Maryland, she moved to New York City in 1985.

== Career ==
Radakovich rose to prominence after her column in Details gained popularity and attracted a loyal readership. She was seen as breaking new ground in the public discussion of sex and sexuality, later to be followed by other sex columnists such as Candace Bushnell, who wrote the column "Sex and the City" for The New York Observer; and Dan Savage, creator of the syndicated column Savage Love. Many of her columns were collected into three books, The Wild Girls Club (1994) Sexplorations (1997) and The Wild Girls Club, Part 2 (2014).

Her popularity through the 1990s led to frequent radio and television appearances on various talk shows, including Late Night with Conan O'Brien, Loveline, Politically Incorrect, Space Ghost Coast to Coast, Today, and The View, along with serving as a commentator on relationships and sexuality for programs on ABC, CNN, E!, Fox News, FX, MTV, NBC, CNBC, MSNBC, and VH1.

In addition to Details, her articles have appeared in Arena, CosmoGirl, Glamour, Harper's Bazaar, Marie Claire, Maxim, New York Magazine, Playboy, Playgirl, Redbook, Seventeen, The New York Daily News, The New York Post, and The Village Voice.

Radakovich has released a third book, The Wild Girls Club, Part 2: Tales from New York to Hollywood.

She is also a guest lecturer at universities across the United States, where she educates and entertains audiences with candid observations on sex, love, and relationships.

== Works ==
- The Wild Girls Club: Tales from Below the Belt, Crown/Random House, 1994, ISBN 0-517-59631-8
- Sexplorations: Journeys to the Erogenous Frontier, Crown/Random House, 1997, ISBN 0-517-70195-2
- The Wild Girls Club, Part 2: Tales from New York to Hollywood, Skytower, 2014, ISBN 0-9904621-2-9
