= Kate Taylor (disambiguation) =

Kate Taylor may refer to:

- Kate Taylor (born 1949), folk singer and singer-songwriter
  - Kate Taylor (album), her self-titled 1978 album
- Kate Taylor (British writer), sex columnist
- Kate Taylor (Canadian writer), novelist and journalist
- Kate Taylor (footballer), New Zealand footballer
- Kate Taylor (TV personality), cast member on The Real Housewives of Jersey

== See also ==
- Katie Taylor, Irish boxer
- Katy Taylor, American figure skater
- Catherine Taylor (disambiguation)
