= Savage Love (book) =

1998 non-fiction book by Dan Savage

- Author: Dan Savage
- Language: English
- Subject: Sex advice
- Publisher: Plume
- Publication date: 1998
- Publication place: United States
- Pages: 256
- ISBN: 978-0-452-27815-8
- OCLC: 39157512
- Followed by: The Kid: What Happened After My Boyfriend and I Decided to Go Get Pregnant (1999)

Savage Love: Straight Answers from America's Most Popular Sex Columnist is a non-fiction book by sex columnist Dan Savage. It was first published in 1998 by Plume.

In Savage Love, the author recounts his early sexual education and experiences, as well as his initial impetus to begin a sex advice column of the same title as the book. Savage Love includes a collection of pieces from the author's column. The book received a favorable reception in reviews from Library Journal, Mademoiselle, POZ, and Gay and Lesbian Humanist.

== Contents ==
In the introduction to Savage Love: Straight Answers from America's Most Popular Sex Columnist, the author gives the reader some background to his early sexual education and experiences. Savage recounts how he first decided to start his advice column in 1991, while employed as the night manager of a video store in Madison, Wisconsin. His friend Tim Keck joined him for a meal in Madison, on his way to Seattle, Washington to form a weekly publication, The Stranger. Savage stated to Keck that he could contribute a weekly advice column with the recommended title of "Hey, Faggot", and this was later modified to become "Savage Love".

Savage writes that communication is a key part of a good sexual experience: "After all, nothing makes a person better at sex than good communication. All sex therapists, advice columnists, and marriage counselors, serious, mainstream, pop culture, religious – are all in agreement on this point".

The book includes a collection of writings from the author's column, Savage Love. Some of the writer's best columns were selected for inclusion in the book. At the time of the book's publication, the author's Savage Love column was six years old, and syndicated to 16 newspapers, with a total of 4 million readers. Savage asserts that his homosexuality affords him an added skill in his trade of advice-giving. The work provides advice for sexual problems of individuals of various lifestyle orientations.

== Publication history ==
The book was first published by Plume in 1998, in paperback format. An e-book format was also released in 1998. A subsequent edition was published by E P Dutton in 1999.

== Reception ==
Martha Cornog of the American College of Physicians reviewed the book for Library Journal, writing, "Sex advice columns provide enlightenment for the erotically challenged as well as voyeuristic entertainment, and the aptonymic Savage delivers on both counts." The review concluded, "Especially recommended for libraries in urban and university locations and wherever Savage Love is syndicated." A review of the book in Mademoiselle commented, "Savage Love: Straight Answers from America's Most Popular Sex Columnist, by Dan Savage, smartly tackles topics from blowing someone off to just blowing someone." Writing for POZ, Xaviera Hollander commented, "His flip, funny, no-holds-barred tone has an edge that his 3.5 million readers either adore or abhor-- and keep coming back for more." Stephen Blake of Gay and Lesbian Humanist noted, "For the uninitiated ... this book is a wonderful introduction to one of America’s best-known sex-advice columnists."

== See also ==
- Advice column
- Savage Love
- Sex columnist
- Skipping Towards Gomorrah: The Seven Deadly Sins and the Pursuit of Happiness in America
