= Kathy Taylor =

Kathy Taylor may refer to:

- Kathy Taylor (politician)
- Kathy Taylor (musician)

== See also ==
- Kathy Tayler, British television presenter and former champion modern pentathlete.
- Catherine Taylor (disambiguation)
