= It Gets Better Mexico =

Non-profit organization

It Gets Better México Logo

It Gets Better México (formerly known as Todo Mejora México) is an organization that was founded in 2014 Rubén Maza. It is the Mexican affiliate of the United States based It Gets Better, an Internet-based 501(c)3 nonprofit with the mission to uplift, empower, and connect lesbian, gay, bisexual, transgender, and queer (LGBTQ+) youth around the globe. Although It Gets Better México is the Mexican affiliate of the It Gets Better Project, It Gets Better México is an independent organization that is autonomously responsible for their own programs, allocation of funding, and building of community partnerships. However, through its relationship with the It Gets Better Project, It Gets Better México reserves the license to the It Gets Better brand. It Gets Better México is one of the It Gets Better Project's 17 international affiliates.

It Gets Better México grew directly in response to harassment directed towards LGBTQ+ youth in México, and also as a means to speak out against the high rates of violence that is targeted towards LGBTQ+ youth in México. The organization's goal is to have individuals share their experiences growing up, so that other LGBTQ+ youth may have figures that can be figures of inspiration and strength. It Gets Better México has collected video submissions from LGBTQ+ activists, celebrities and allies.

Map of México

It Gets Better México has reached thousands of viewers through its YouTube channel. Globally, there have been over 60,000 video submissions combined under the hashtags #TodoMejora and #ItGetsBetter. These videos have garnered millions of views. It Gets Better México connects Mexicans with resources and curricula from all over Latin America. It showcases the stories of LGBTQ+ identifying individuals and aims to create more visibility for the LGBTQ+ community at large. They have reached hundreds of thousands of people through TikTok, Twitter, Twitch, YouTube, Instagram, and Facebook.

== Project History ==
The It Gets Better project was founded by Dan Savage and his husband Terry Miller on September 21, 2010. It was founded with the goal of supporting LGBTQ+ youth in the United States through their adolescence and in response to the suicides of youth like Tyler Clementi and Ryan Halligan.

Fernanda Garza uploaded her video titled "It Gets Better!!;)" on June 29, 2012. In her video she spoke about how she wanted to share her story in order to "help all those people that are looking for videos about who they are... I wanted you all to see something positive instead of something that would say you shouldn't feel that way that you do." (translated from Spanish to English)

It Gets Better México was officially launched two years later in 2014, Rubén Maza founding the organization. The Mexican affiliate was founded after years of activists advocating for increased visibility for queer individuals within México. It Gets Better México was primarily led by activist Alex Orué, and thus focused with advocating for LGBTQ+ youth and individuals suffering from HIV. But through aligning themselves with México's larger social movements like the feminist movement within México against Femicide, they grew their presence. In his writings on the subject of LGBTQ+ movements flourishing in the 21st century, political scientist Javier Corrales wrote: "On the question of alliance-building, the literature on social movements suggests that, to be successful in changing policy, small social movements must develop alliances with larger social movements or political actors. This was the case in Argentina and México City, where pro-LGBT movements formed key alliances with the largest and most developed social movements in each country: human rights groups in Argentina (especially those seeking that more be done to uncover human rights abuses during the dictatorship) and democratizing movements in México that had been working in the country since the 1990s."

In conjunction with finding common ground with and learning from feminist movements, It Gets Better México has leveraged the newfound access to technology and social media within Latin America in recent years. It Gets Better México's headquarters are based out of Monterrey, Nuevo León, but their reach extends throughout México and Latin America. In the years since their founding in 2014, they continued to showcase the stories of everyday LGBTQ+ people, celebrities and activists They have also started other initiatives that seek to build off of the increasing accessibility to technology and social media platforms like WhatsApp. They offer free access to psychological support through WhatsApp, have continued to share the stories of LGBTQ+ identifying people on their website, promote educational resources on their TikTok and Twitter accounts, and have committed to supporting LGBTQ+ communities on spaces like Twitch, as well.
