= The Commitment: Love, Sex, Marriage, and My Family =

2005 book by Dan Savage

- Author: Dan Savage
- Language: English
- Subject: Family, marriage, sex
- Publisher: Dutton
- Publication date: 2005
- Publication place: United States
- Media type: Print
- Pages: 304
- ISBN: 978-0-525-94907-7
- OCLC: 61492912
- Preceded by: Skipping Towards Gomorrah: The Seven Deadly Sins and the Pursuit of Happiness in America (2002)
- Followed by: It Gets Better: Coming Out, Overcoming Bullying, and Creating a Life Worth Living (2011)

The Commitment: Love, Sex, Marriage, and My Family is a non-fiction book by Dan Savage. It was first published by Dutton in 2005. The book delves into the author's experiences with his partner Terry Miller and their adopted son as they decide whether or not to get married. Throughout the course of the book, Savage incorporates an analysis of the debate over same-sex marriage within society.

The book reached The New York Times Best Seller list one month after it was published, and saw successful sales with independent bookstores. A review of the book in Publishers Weekly concluded, "As funny as David Sedaris's essay collections, but bawdier and more thought-provoking, this timely book shows that being pro-family doesn't have to mean being anti-gay." The Commitment received favorable reception from The Seattle Times, the Seattle Post-Intelligencer, The Capital Times, and the Wisconsin State Journal. A review of the book in The Washington Post was critical, observing, "Savage fails to note any significant social progress or acknowledge the suffering of other repressed groups; he just drones on, preaching to the choir." The Rocky Mountain News noted, "If there's a flaw in The Commitment, it's that the author's gay activism tends to get heavy-handed as he comments on the gay lifestyle – a detraction from the subtle, poignant points he makes with humorous anecdotes."

== Contents ==
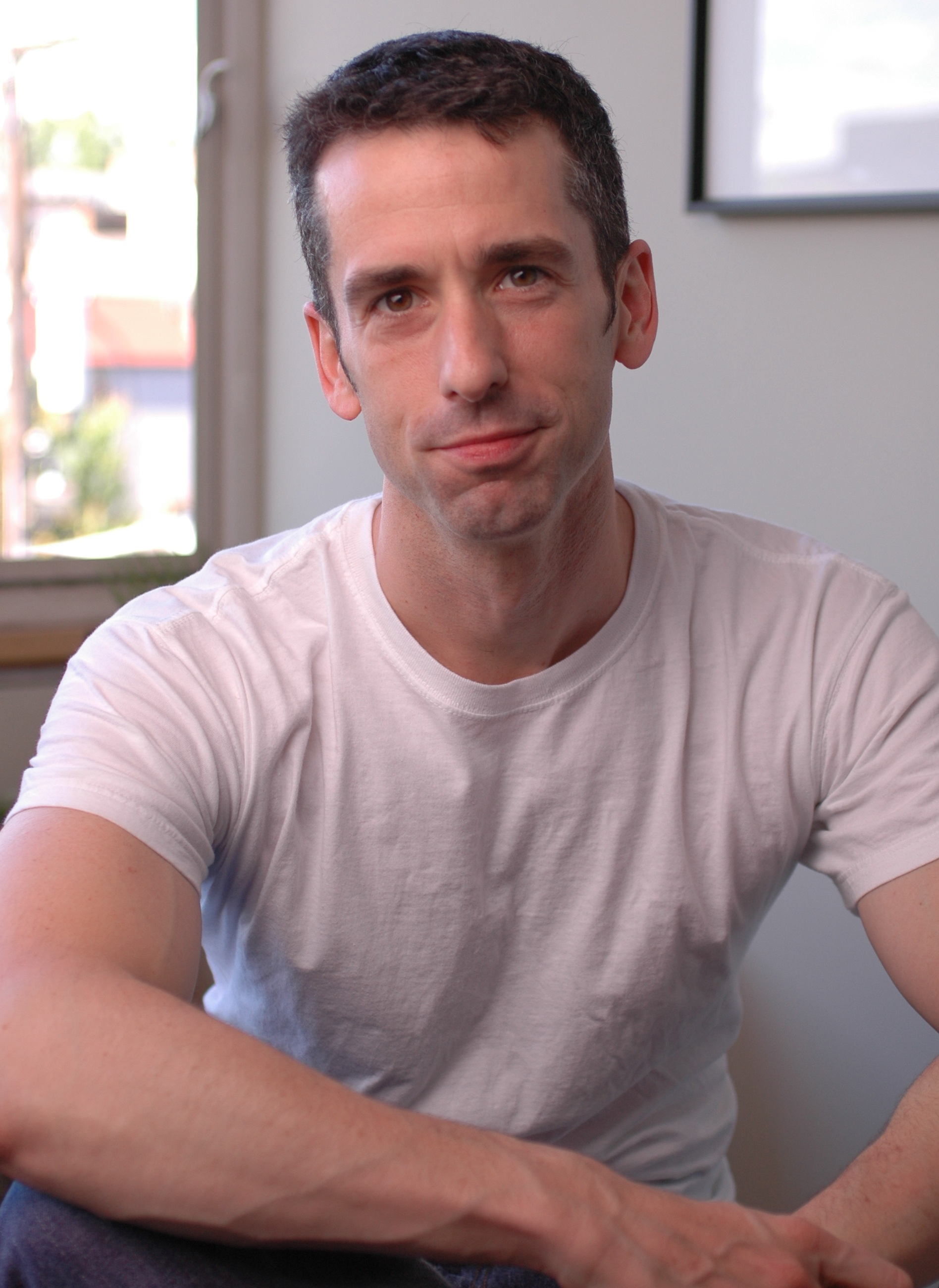
Dan Savage (2005)

The Commitment recounts the author's experiences along with his partner, Terry Miller, as they debate getting married after spending ten years in a relationship together. The impetus for the initial discussion was the motivation for marriage placed upon Savage by his mother. Savage attempts to answer the question, "How can two gay guys be in favor of legal, same-sex marriage and huge fans of the traditional family without wanting to marry?" He writes, "You reach your limit more quickly when your kid is sitting at the kitchen table in his Incredible Hulk pj's, eating his breakfast, pausing now and again to wiggle one of his loose baby teeth, all the while listening to his parents' relationship described as a threat to all things decent and good." Savage notes that he is employed and provides funding for the family, whilst Terry remains in their house and takes care of their son. A chapter of the book is also devoted to Savage's adopted son's birth mother, who was homeless.

Throughout the work, Savage takes the opportunity to analyze the controversy over same-sex marriage while taking a comedic approach to his writing style. He describes how marriage has been practised by Christians during medieval times, his family members, and acquaintances. The couple discuss the fact that within their state of Washington in the United States, marriage did not afford the couple legal protection. Terry informs Savage that he would rather utilize tattoos as a way of demonstrating the strength of the couple's relationship. Savage's son, six-years-old, tells him that he believes only women and men were able to marry each other. "Boys don't marry boys," his son informs him. Savage writes about his anxiousness over how the permanency of marriage might impact his relationship. He decides to explain to his son his views on the core meaning of marriage. The couple decide to wed, and are married in Canada.

== Publication history ==
The Commitment was first published by Dutton in September 2005. Plume released an e-book version in 2005, as did Dutton. A subsequent edition was published by Plume in 2006. An audiobook edition was published by Blackstone Audio, Inc., in 2011.

== Reception ==
Sales of The Commitment: Love, Sex, Marriage, and My Family were successful, and it reached the eighth spot on The New York Times Best Seller list one month after it was published. In addition, The Commitment saw successful sales with independent bookstores. The Washington Post reported that according to Nielsen BookScan approximately 300,000 copies of the book were sold. The book received a positive reception from Publishers Weekly; the review commented, "Savage skewers ideologues, both pro– and anti–gay marriage, with his radical pragmatism. Disproving Tolstoy's dictum that 'happy families are all alike,' he takes a sharp-eyed, compassionate look at matrimony as it is actually practiced by friends, his raucously affectionate family and even medieval Christians." The review concluded, "As funny as David Sedaris's essay collections, but bawdier and more thought-provoking, this timely book shows that being pro-family doesn't have to mean being anti-gay." Brangien Davis wrote for The Seattle Times, "While Savage peppers the book with political observations both well researched and witty, The Commitment in no way reads like a diatribe." John Marshall of the Seattle Post-Intelligencer characterized the book as, "a witty, ribald memoir with his trademark zingers". Marshall commented, "'The Commitment' also considers important human questions: What is the nature of love? What does marriage require? What role do parental wishes play? And what if their adopted son is opposed to marriage but in favor of wedding cake?"

A review of the book for The Washington Post written by Carolyn See was critical, observing, "Savage fails to note any significant social progress or acknowledge the suffering of other repressed groups; he just drones on, preaching to the choir." Heather Lee Schroeder of The Capital Times noted, "Savage's often raunchy advice columns might seem at odds with this self-revelatory memoir that explores gay marriage and the meaning of family through Savage's own attempts to marry his longtime partner." Journalist Laurence Washington of Rocky Mountain News wrote negatively of the author's apparent activism in the work, "If there's a flaw in The Commitment, it's that the author's gay activism tends to get heavy-handed as he comments on the gay lifestyle – a detraction from the subtle, poignant points he makes with humorous anecdotes." Washington's review concluded, "The Commitment is about gay marriage, to be sure, but Savage has written something much broader and more important – his is a story about humanity, relationships and the ties that bind, no matter what your sexual orientation might be." In a review for the Wisconsin State Journal, Gayle Worland wrote, "Since 'Commitment' is a Dan Savage work, it is relentlessly and understatedly funny. It is also an endearing memoir about family dynamics, a musing on the importance of lifelong vows and, at times, a sermon on the issue of same-sex marriage." The Daily Astorian noted, "Savage excels at scathing political commentary, as well as personal, brutally honest revelations that can make a reader weep."

== See also ==
- LGBT adoption
- LGBT rights in the United States
- Same-sex marriage
- Same-sex marriage and the family
- Same-sex marriage in the United States
- Status of same-sex marriage
- Timeline of same-sex marriage
