= Sex columnist =

Writer of a newspaper or magazine column about sex

A sex columnist is a writer of a newspaper or magazine column about sex. Sex advice columns may take the form of essays or, more frequently, answers to questions posed by readers. Sex advice columns can usually be found in alt weekly newspapers, women's magazines, health or fitness magazines, and student newspapers. While some are written by sexologists, many are penned by people lacking credentials in human sexuality and relationships, yet willing to divulge their opinions or personal bedroom antics.

The television series Sex and the City protagonist Carrie Bradshaw was a sex columnist, which author Candace Bushnell modeled after herself in her original non-fiction book based on a column of the same name. The show, which first aired in 1998, is credited with the increase of sex columnists found in college campus newspapers and blogs, such as at Ivy League colleges and many other schools. One such columnist, Meghan Bainum, at the University of Kansas, Lawrence, placed in the 42nd annual William Randolph Hearst Foundation Journalism Awards Program (2001–2002) for her column.

Anka Radakovich was the first of a new breed of sex columnists for whom "every detail of the writer's psyche is splayed across the page ... confessional journalism at its most intimate". Radakovich had written for the old Details magazine when it was a chronicle of downtown fashion and night life. After James Truman became editor-in-chief and transformed Details into a men's magazine, he offered Radakovich a column in September 1990. She became the first modern-day magazine sex columnist working for a mainstream men's publication.

The popularity of sex columns waned after the 2000s, but they remain popular at some newspapers, such as The Student Life at the Claremont Colleges.

== Notable sex columnists ==
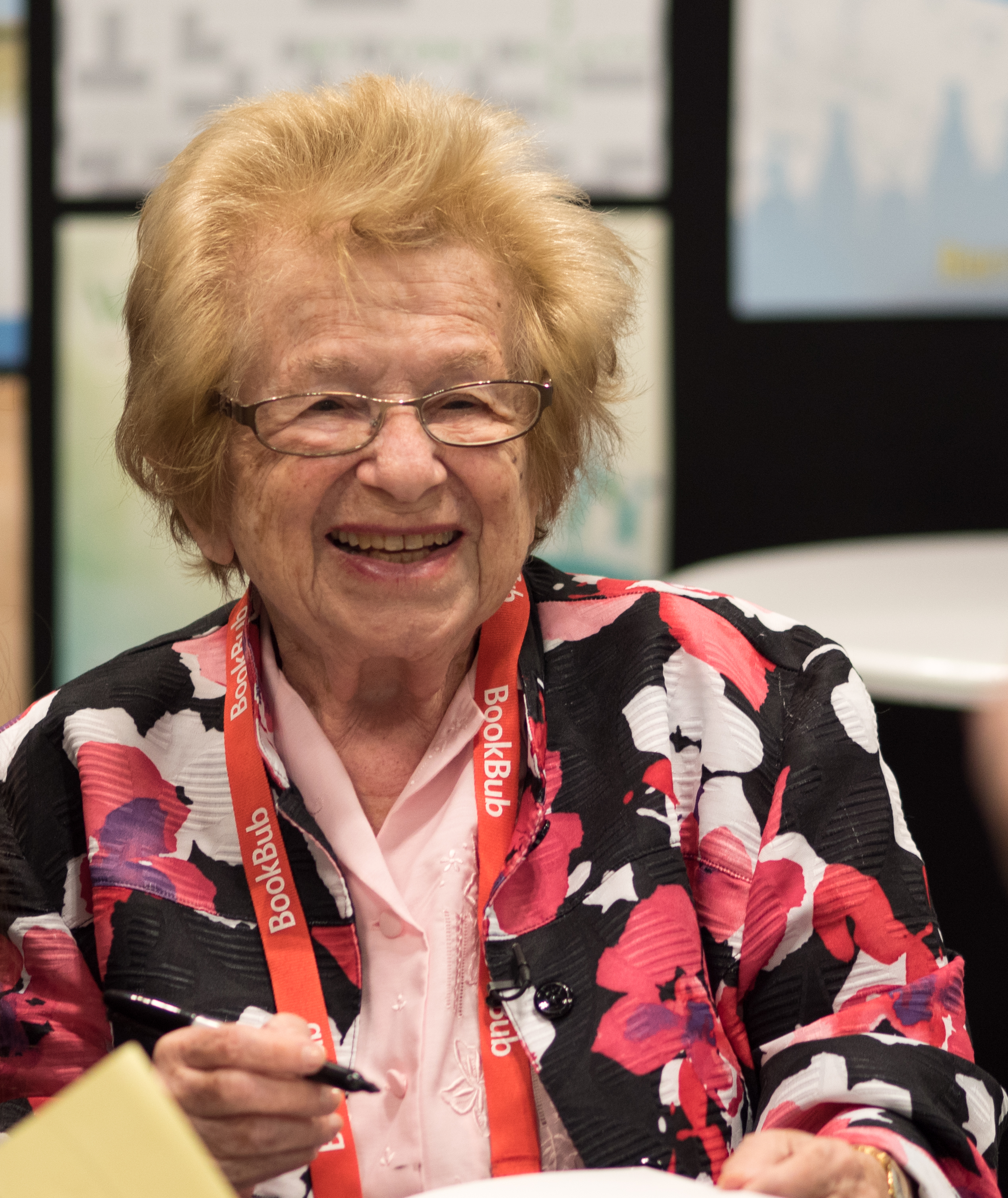
Ruth Westheimer

- Millicent Binks writes the sex column "Up All Night" for the London Evening Standard
- Violet Blue, "Open Source Sex" columnist for the San Francisco Chronicle
- Candace Bushnell, former "Sex and the City" columnist for The New York Observer
- Rachel Kramer Bussel, formerly "Lusty Lady" for The Village Voice, also writes for Penthouse and Penthouse Variations
- Patrick Califia, at that time a lesbian with birth name of Pat Califia, for the former gay men's leather BDSM magazine Drummer.
- Tracey Cox, author of sex books, columnist for Australian Cosmopolitan, iVillage, and other media displays including television shows
- Anna David, former sex and relationship column for Razor
- Stacey Grenrock-Woods, current sex columnist for Esquire
- Debby Herbenick, PhD, author, and host of "Kinsey Confidential" for Kinsey Institute for Research in Sex, Gender, and Reproduction; "Sex Professor" columnist for Men's Health magazine; "Ask the Sex Doc" columnist for NUVO (Indiana); former "In & Out" columnist for Time Out Chicago magazine; former "Loveville" columnist for the Louisville Courier-Journal's Velocity.
- Twanna A. Hines, former Blog-A-Log sex and relationships columnist for Nerve
- Anka Radakovich, current British GQ sex columnist and former Details magazine sex columnist from 1990 to 1999.
- Margaret Sanger, author of "What Every Mother Should Know" (1911–12) and "What Every Girl Should Know" (1912–13) for the socialist magazine New York Call, later creator of The Woman Rebel.
- Dan Savage, creator of the syndicated sex column Savage Love
- Amy Sohn, former sex columnist for New York
- Kate Taylor (British writer), GQ magazine
- Helen Gurley, author of the 'sex and the single girl' column in Cosmopolitan Magazine
- Tristan Taormino, former "Pucker Up" syndicated columnist for The Village Voice
- Ruth Westheimer, "Ask Dr. Ruth" columnist since the 1980s
- Suzi Godson, sex and relationships columnist for The Times since

Selected university newspaper columnists, past and present

- Lena Chen, The Harvard Crimson and Sex and the Ivy: The Bleeding Heart Nympho's Guide To Harvard Life, Harvard University
- Dr. Yvonne K. Fulbright, "Sexpert Tells All," Washington Square News, New York University
