= Millicent Binks =

English writer and performance artist

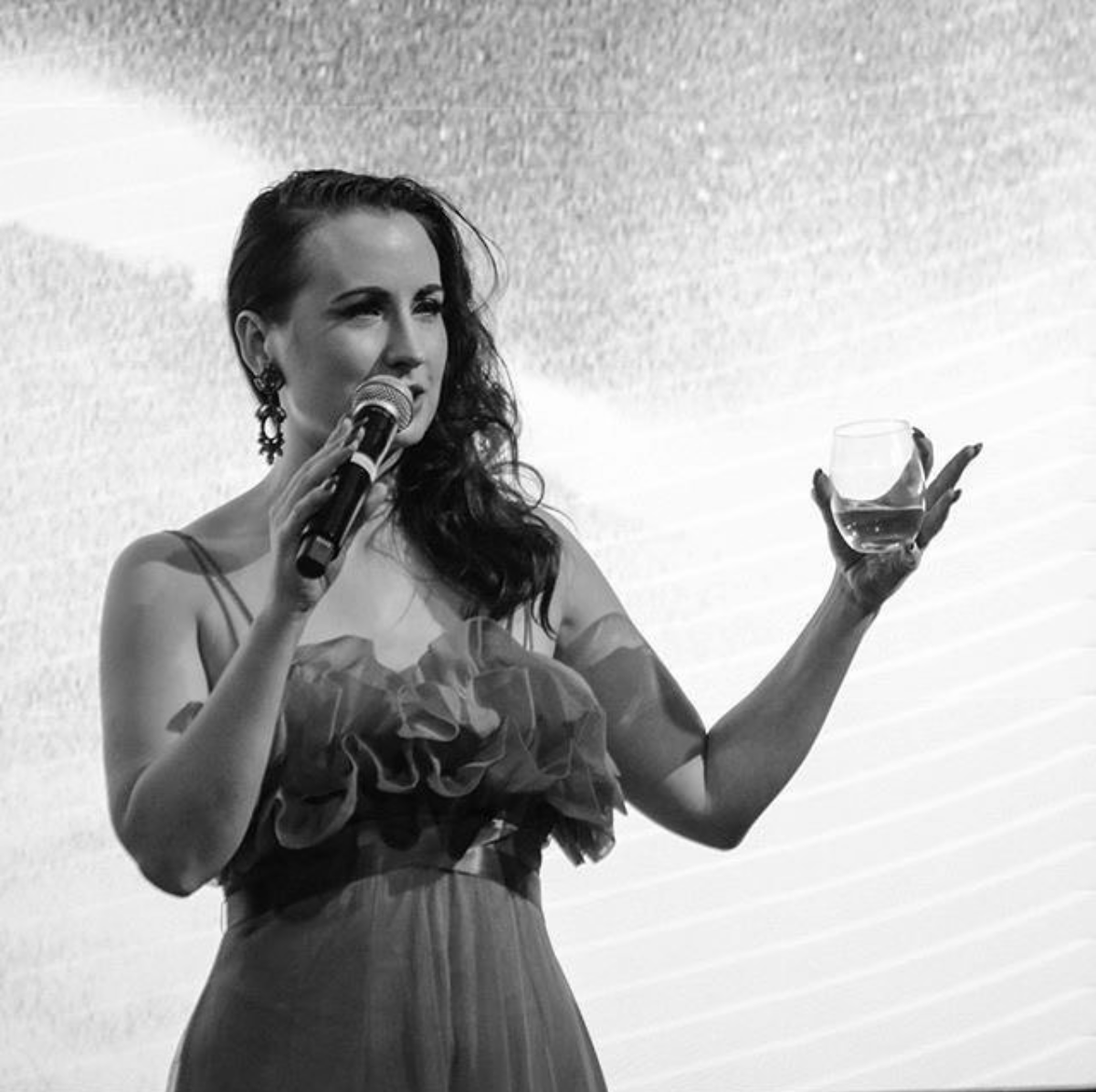
- Millicent Binks, in 2019
- Occupations: Writer, performance artist
- Website: www.millicentbinks.co.uk

Millicent Binks is an English writer and performance artist. She wrote a column about her life in The London Evening Standard.

== Early years ==
Binks grew up in Suffolk, England. Her father is a nuclear physicist and her mother is a linguist.

== Writing ==
When Binks first moved to London she enrolled on a Creative Writing degree which she dropped out of after three months to pursue a burlesque performance career, but kept writing for her own pleasure.

In April 2011, the London Evening Standard approached her to be their new sex columnist. Her writing style is tongue-in-cheek and humorous, whilst documenting her and her friends' sex lives in London regularly commenting on fashion and lingerie, with a readership of up to 2 million every week. In October 2018 she was on the cover of The Sunday Times Magazine for a piece she wrote about chatting up men in different personae.

== Performance ==
Fascinated with the performance art and burlesque she came across in London, Binks decided to try it herself, combining her love of costume, dance and characterisation. She graduated with a BA (Hons) in Costume Interpretation from Wimbledon College of Arts. She performed her English Rose show at The Gentry de Paris Revue, who Binks is greatly influenced by. She has performed all over Europe and had a monthly residency in Istanbul. Binks has performed for British BAFTA Award-winning Artist Alison Jackson.
