= Tawana =

Tawana may refer to:

- Tswana, an ethnic group in Botswana
- List of rulers of Tawana

== People ==
- Tawana Brawley rape hoax
- Tawana Kupe, Zimbabwean-South African academic
- Kea Tawana (c. 1935 - August 4, 2016) American artist

== See also ==
- Twana (given name)
