= Twanna Hines =

American writer and internet personality

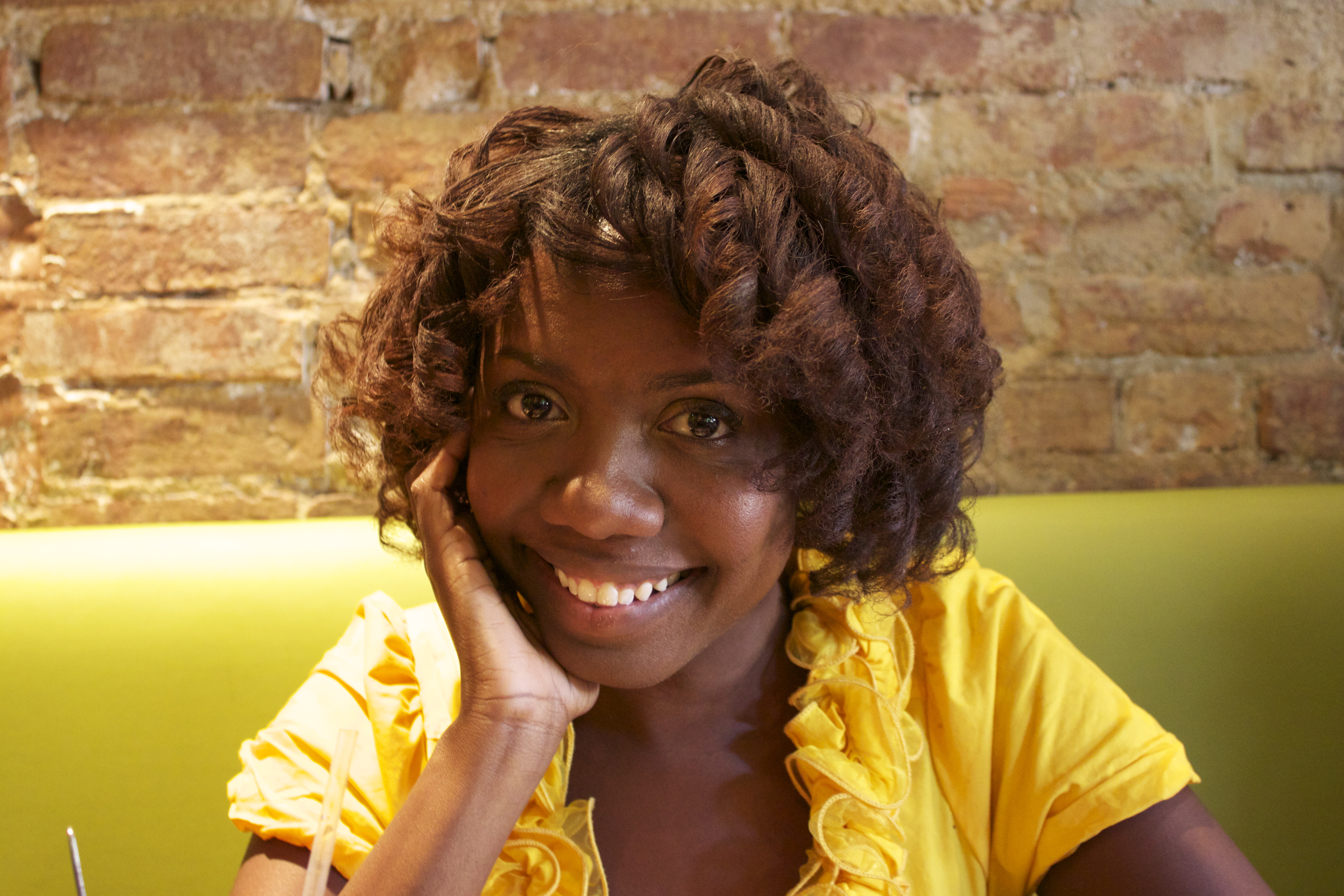
- Twanna A. Hines performing in New York City
- Born: Twanna Angela Hines; January 20, 1975 (age 51); Illinois, US
- Education: Illinois State University (BS); Florida State University (MS)
- Occupation: Writer
- Writing career
- Pen name: Funky Brown Chick
- Period: 21st century
- Genre: Memoir
- Subject: Human sexuality
- Website: funkybrownchick.com

Twanna Angela Hines (born 1975) is an American writer, internet personality, and sex educator who also discusses human sexuality and relationships on her website Funky Brown Chick.

== Biography ==
Hines attended Illinois State University, where she received a Bachelor of Science in Sociology, and Florida State University, where she received her Master of Science and she also completed post-graduate education at Universiteit van Amsterdam and New York University.

She appears on television, film, and radio programs including Spark (Canadian Broadcasting Corporation), Maximum Radio (Sirius Satellite Radio), and NPR. She was a sex columnist for Nerve, and is currently a syndicated sex columnist for Metro International.

== Publications ==
=== Books: contributor ===
- 'Six-Word Memoirs on Love and Heartbreak: by Writers Famous and Obscure', New York Times Best Seller, Harper Perennial, 2009, ISBN 978-0061714627
- 'On purpose: Rhetorical Analysis of Non-fiction', Gyldendal Uddannelse, 2009, ISBN 978-8702064865
- 'Migration and Immigration: A Global View, A World View of Social Issues', Greenwood Press, 2004, ISBN 978-0313330445

=== Articles ===
- Hines, Twanna A. (October 30, 2011). "Sex education in school saves lives". "The Journal News".
- Hines, Twanna A. (December 10, 2010) 4 Tips to Spice Up Your Sex Life "BlogHer"
- Hines, Twanna A. (July 13, 2010) Interview: Jillian Lauren, author of Some Girls: My Life in a Harem "SMITH" magazine.
- Hines, Twanna A. (2010, 5 May) Sex Bombs and Legalized Prostitution in Times Square "The Huffington Post".
- Hines, Twanna A. and Moodie, Desiree (January 26, 2010) Do You Like To Have Sex During Your Period? "The Frisky"
- Hines, Twanna A. (December 31, 2008) I'm a Writer, Not a Child Pornographer "The Huffington Post".
- Hines, Twanna A. (November 6, 2008) Jean-Claude Van Damme Gets "Raw" in JCVD "The Huffington Post".
- Hines, Twanna A. (October 30, 2008). "Take My Vibrator, Please!". "New York Press".
- Hines, Twanna A. (October 24, 2008) Political Sex Scandals: Obama, McCain & Palin "The Huffington Post".
- Hines, Twanna A. (September 11, 2008). "Top 5 Online Dating Site Trends". Mashable.
- Hines, Twanna A. (August 19, 2008) Freakonomics: Interracial Sex Makes Us More Beautiful "The Huffington Post".
- Hines, Twanna A. (February 13, 2008). "Is Facebook Helping or Hurting Your Love Life?". "Fast Company" magazine.
- Hines, Twanna A.. "Don't Call Your Ex". "Lifetime".
- Hines, Twanna A.. "How to Find a Sex Therapist and Your Orgasm". "The Stir".
