= The Kid (Savage book) =

1999 book by Dan Savage

- Cover
- Author: Dan Savage
- Language: English
- Subject: Parenting
- Publisher: Dutton
- Publication date: 1999
- Publication place: United States
- Media type: Print
- Pages: 246
- ISBN: 978-0-525-94525-3
- OCLC: 41445757
- Preceded by: Savage Love: Straight Answers from America's Most Popular Sex Columnist (1998)
- Followed by: Skipping Towards Gomorrah: The Seven Deadly Sins and the Pursuit of Happiness in America (2002)

The Kid: What Happened After My Boyfriend and I Decided to Go Get Pregnant is a non-fiction book by Dan Savage. It was first published by Dutton in 1999. The book recounts the author's experiences during the process of adopting a child with his partner, Terry. Savage details for the reader his emotional states at various times during the adoption period and how it affected his life.

The Kid is the recipient of a PEN West Award. Robin Williams' production company purchased the options to develop the book for television in 2000. The book was adapted into a musical in 2010 by librettist Michael Zam, with music composed by Andy Monroe, and lyrics by Jack Lechner. Christopher Sieber starred in the lead role as Dan. It was performed Off-Broadway in Theatre Row, New York City, and directed by Scott Elliott. The play was the recipient of the BMI Foundation Jerry Bock Award for Excellence in Musical Theatre in 2009.

== Contents ==
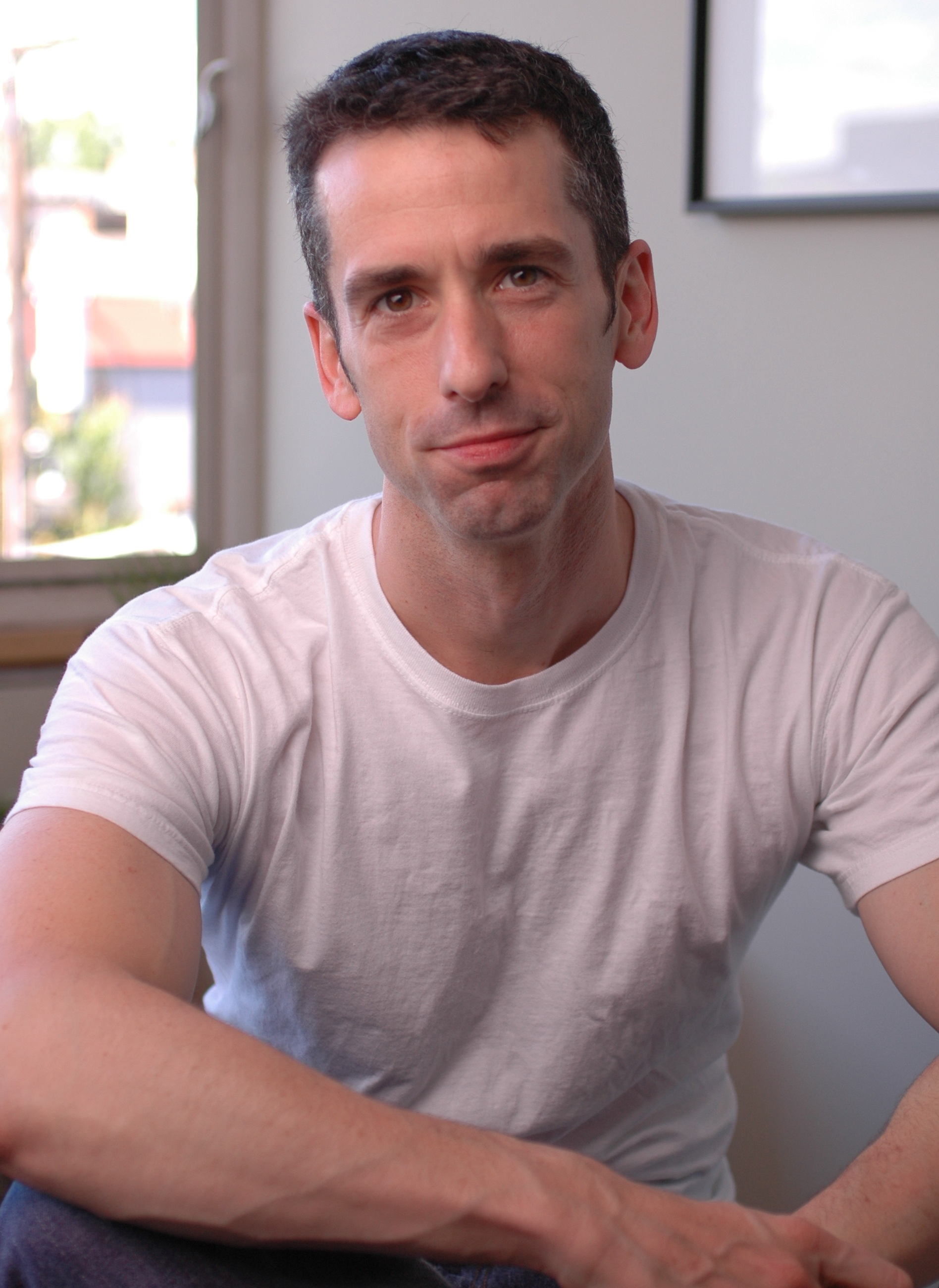
Dan Savage (2005)

The Kid delves into the machinations involved in the process of adopting an infant boy, through the experiences of the author and his boyfriend. Savage describes the psychological roller-coaster experience of deciding to go through with the process, such as worrying about which items to purchase to support raising an infant, moments where he was nervous about how it would impact his sex life, and what his straight and gay friends would think. Savage comments that an LGBTQ activist thought those who adopt children were ideal candidates if they were "men in their forties, together at least eight years, monogamous, professional, irreproachable, and unassailable." He expresses "a complex sense of moral obligation" in writing the narrative.

Terry, Savage's boyfriend at the time for two years, initially helped him look into the option of seeking out lesbian acquaintances to assist them in becoming biological parents. Savage writes, "Terry and I would be giving up certain things that, for better or worse, define what it means to be gay." Subsequently, they decided to go through the process of adoption. Terry and Savage were connected with Melissa and communicated with her during her pregnancy. Savage discusses his anger at his grandmother over her homophobia, his experiences in the bedroom including bondage and other preferences, and his decision to become a father. He notes that an influential point in the process was viewing the distress from the baby's mother when she separated from her child. The author writes, "We're meant to have the baby we wind up getting, and no other." Savage describes the success at completing the adoption procedures as a form of "social victory."

== Publication history ==
The Kid was first published by Dutton in 1999 as a hardcover edition. Plume publishing company released an e-book in 1999. A subsequent edition was published in 2000 in London by Fusion, and in the United States by Penguin Putnam Inc. A paperback edition was published by Plume in 2000. The book was published in Italian in 2002 by Tascabili Degli Editori.

== Reception ==
The Kid received a PEN Center USA West Award. It was recognized with the award in 2000, in the category of Excellence in Creative Nonfiction. Writing in the journal Feminist Economics, June Lapidus called The Kid a "warm, funny, and insightful book". Author Andrew R. Gottlieb wrote in the book Sons Talk About Their Gay Fathers: Life Curves, "Fast and funny, incisive and insightful, Dan Savage's (1999) The Kid is an exploration of one gay man's experience and one gay couple's experience confronting the open adoption bureaucracy. With razor-sharp scrutiny, Savage spares no one, including himself." A review for The News Tribune by Linda Dahlstrom commented that the book was quite moving, "In fact, that's one of the surprises of the book—that in the end, above everything else, it's a touching, funny story about an American family in the '90s." Gwen Florio of The Philadelphia Inquirer described the section of the book where the child's mother gives the baby to his new parents as "the most wrenching scene." Entertainment Weekly characterized the work as "one of the best books published in 1999", and called the author's writing, "as moving as it is entertaining".

A review in Salon described the book as "a very moving memoir." Reviewer Daryl Lindsey commented, "Despite the expediency of their experience, the book is full of twists and turns, each subjected to Savage's snide and penetrating wit. And in an uncharacteristically wide-eyed mood, Savage provides a lovely tale about the thrill of anticipating a baby—even when it isn't yours (by birth)." Publishers Weekly reviewed the work and commented, "Employing the blunt tone of his columns, Savage humorously and honestly discusses his sexual practices (including bondage and fantasies involving actor Matt Damon), his ambivalence about being a parent and his rage at his homophobic grandmother. His forthrightness is brave and daring in the face of social opposition to gay parenting." The review concluded, "However, though Savage's chatty, mercilessly satiric style is effective in his columns and may be intended here to balance the optimistic underpinnings of his journey into parenthood, in this sustained narrative it wears a bit thin."

== Adaptations ==
=== Television ===
In 2000, the production company of Robin Williams, Blue Wolf Productions, purchased the options to develop the book for television.

=== Theatre ===
In 2010, The Kid was produced as a musical Off-Broadway. The play was developed by librettist Michael Zam. Music for the play was composed by Andy Monroe, with lyrics by Jack Lechner. Savage was portrayed by Christopher Sieber. It was performed in Theatre Row, New York City, from The New Group, with director Scott Elliott. The Kid was the recipient of the BMI Foundation Jerry Bock Award for Excellence in Musical Theatre in 2009.

The New York Times gave the musical a favorable review: "Vibrators, leather bars and good old-fashioned sodomy have never looked more wholesome than they do in The Kid." The Star-Ledger reviewer commented, "It's a really funny show. And rather touching, as well. A lot of the jokes are based on the would-be adoptive couple being two men. But the sharp humor is balanced with a sweetness and humanity that makes their emotional experience relatable for everyone." The New York Post gave the musical a rating of three and a half out of four stars, with reviewer Elisabeth Vincentelli writing, "The administrative roller coaster provides a gold mine of amusing material, but this tender, funny show is more about the emotional journey of becoming a parent for the first time." A review in the New York Daily News commented, "The show is well-meaning but surprisingly bland and corny." Jesse Oxfeld wrote for The New York Observer, "Michael Zam's script is often very funny and can occasionally be moving ... But at two and a half hours (including intermission), with 22 musical numbers and that mess of characters, there is a lack of focus".

== See also ==
- Heterosexism
- LGBT adoption
- LGBT parenting
- LGBT rights
- Same-sex marriages and civil unions
- Preacher's Sons - a documentary about a gay adoptive couple
- Mommy Mommy - a documentary about a lesbian adoptive couple
