= Savage U =

- Genre: Talk show
- Created by: Dan Savage; Shannon Fitzgerald
- Starring: Dan Savage; Lauren Hutchinson
- Theme music composer: New Cassettes
- Opening theme: "Monument"
- Country of origin: United States
- No. of seasons: 1
- No. of episodes: 12

Production
- Executive producers: Brian Pines; Bryan Scott; Catherine Whyte; Christy Spitzer; Dan Savage; Deb Savo; Lesley Goldman; Lisa Tucker
- Production company: Picture This Television

Original release
- Network: MTV
- Release: April 3 – June 19, 2012

Savage U is an American talk show series on MTV. The series debuted on April 3, 2012.

== Premise ==
The series follows Dan Savage and Lauren Hutchinson as they travel to different colleges across the United States. In each episode, there is an open Q&A session where Savage and Hutchinson discuss anonymous questions submitted by the audience. Within the episodes, Savage has a one-on-one session with various students who have issues that encase deeper relationship problems.

== Episodes ==
No.	Title	Original release date
1	"University of Maryland"	April 3, 2012
2	"Ohio State"	April 10, 2012
3	"East Carolina"	April 17, 2012
4	"Auburn"	April 24, 2012
5	"UIC"	May 1, 2012
6	"University of Central Florida"	May 8, 2012
7	"Rhodes"	May 15, 2012
8	"Oregon"	May 22, 2012
9	"UC Irvine"	May 29, 2012
10	"Tulane"	June 5, 2012
11	"Cornell"	June 12, 2012
12	"Texas Tech University"	June 19, 2012
