= Kathleen Taylor =

Kathleen Taylor may refer to:

- Kathleen Taylor (biologist), popular science author and a research scientist
- Kathleen Taylor (business executive) (born 1957), chair of the board of the Royal Bank of Canada
- Kathleen Taylor (field hockey) (born 1984), South African Olympic field hockey player
- Kathleen Taylor (politician), Oregon state representative
- Kathleen C. Taylor (born 1942), chemist
- Kathleen de Vere Taylor (c. 1873–1949), American suffragist and stockbroker
