= Twana Khalid Ahmed =

Iraqi football referee

Domestic
Years	League	Role
2020–present	Icelandic leagues	Referee

Twana Khalid Ahmed is a Kurdish football referee. He started refereeing in Iraq at the age of 16 and later refereed in the Iraqi Premier League. Following the War in Iraq, he sought asylum in Germany where he refereed in youth leagues. In June 2017, he emigrated to Iceland, and started refereeing again in 2020. In June 2023, he refereed in the top-tier Besta deild karla for the first time.
