= Inforum =

American business organization

Inforum, headquartered in downtown Detroit and in Grand Rapids, was founded as the Women's Economic Club (WEC) in July 1962.

== History ==
The WEC was created when Marie Moon, Alice Snider, Thelma Murrell and Dorothy Seifert gathered a group of 23 women together to discuss the formation of a luncheon club. The WEC officially received its charter from the National Federation of Business and Professional Women's Clubs (NFBPWC) in 1962. It became an independent organization with its own by-laws in 1965.

In 2005, members voted to change the name of the organization to Inforum: A Professional Women's Alliance. This better reflected the mission of the organization, which was to strengthen the business environment in Michigan by creating opportunities for women to lead and succeed. Activities and programs encompass luncheons, seminars, leadership courses, and other networking events which allow members to build alliances with colleagues into empowering combinations.

Since 2003, Inforum has published a biennial study with the Wayne State University School of Business Administration to analyze the number of women board members on Fortune 500 companies.

In June 2016, members voted to transfer Inforum's assets to the Inforum Center for Leadership. The combined 501(c)(3) charitable and educational nonprofit operates as Inforum.

== Leadership ==
The 52-person Inforum Board of Directors is led by Diana Tremblay, vice president of global services, General Motors. Terry Barclay is the organization's President and CEO.
