= It Gets Better (book) =

2011 book by Dan Savage

- Editors: Dan Savage, Terry Miller
- Language: English
- Subject: LGBT community
- Publisher: Dutton
- Publication date: March 22, 2011
- Publication place: United States
- Media type: Hardcover
- Pages: 352
- ISBN: 0-525-95233-0
- OCLC: 690088227
- Preceded by: The Commitment: Love, Sex, Marriage, and My Family (2005)

It Gets Better: Coming Out, Overcoming Bullying, and Creating a Life Worth Living is a non-fiction compilation book, edited by Dan Savage and his husband, Terry Miller. It was published March 22, 2011 by Dutton. The book includes selections of essays inspired by the It Gets Better Project, founded by Savage. He decided to start the project after a series of incidents of suicide among LGBT youth. Individuals were encouraged to submit videos with a message of hope and optimism for teenagers who were victims of bullying due to their sexual orientation. Over 100 essays are contained in the book. Contributors include finance advisor Suze Orman; comedic writer David Sedaris; United States Secretary of State Hillary Clinton; and President of the United States Barack Obama.

Sales of the book were successful, and IndieBound reported it reached a list of bestsellers in the United States less than one week after publication. It reached The New York Times Best Seller list in April 2011. The Chicago Sun-Times noted that the book "features handpicked and heartfelt essays from contributors famous and obscure, gay and straight."

== Background ==
President of the United States Barack Obama contributed a video to the It Gets Better Project (2010) — and is included in the book.

Dan Savage started the It Gets Better Project in September 2010 in order to address incidents of suicide among LGBT youth. He felt impacted by suicides of youths, including Tyler Clementi, who were tormented because of their sexual orientation. The purpose of the project is to reach out to teenagers and to provide them with hope and optimism in the face of bullying.

"I was just stewing on the kids, and the reaction you always have as a gay adult is 'I wish I could have talked to that kid,' to have been able to tell him it gets better," explained Savage. The project intended to inform teenagers that "it gets better" through video submissions to the organization. Savage commented,

When a 15-year-old or a 13-year-old kills himself because he is gay, what he’s saying is that he can’t picture a future with enough joy in it to compensate for the pain he’s in now, to make enduring this and getting through it worth it. We gay adults know adult gay life is pretty awesome....You can have a totally wonderful, rewarding adult gay life. A lot of gay kids don't know that. You wish you could tell him that it gets better and that was the phrase rattling around in my head.

Savage's initial goal was to compile 100 videos. By February 2011, approximately 10,000 people had submitted videos, which were watched 30 million times on video sharing websites, including YouTube. Video submissions included a speech addressed to youth from the president of the United States, as well as the prime minister of the United Kingdom. The Trevor Project, an organization which provides services to LGBT youth, noted that after the foundation of the It Gets Better Project, the group saw a 50% increase in telephone calls to their suicide hotline. Contributors to the book wrote essays after receiving inspiration from the It Gets Better Project. Savage donated his profits from the book to charitable organizations dedicated to assisting lesbian, gay, bisexual, and transgender young people.

== Contents ==
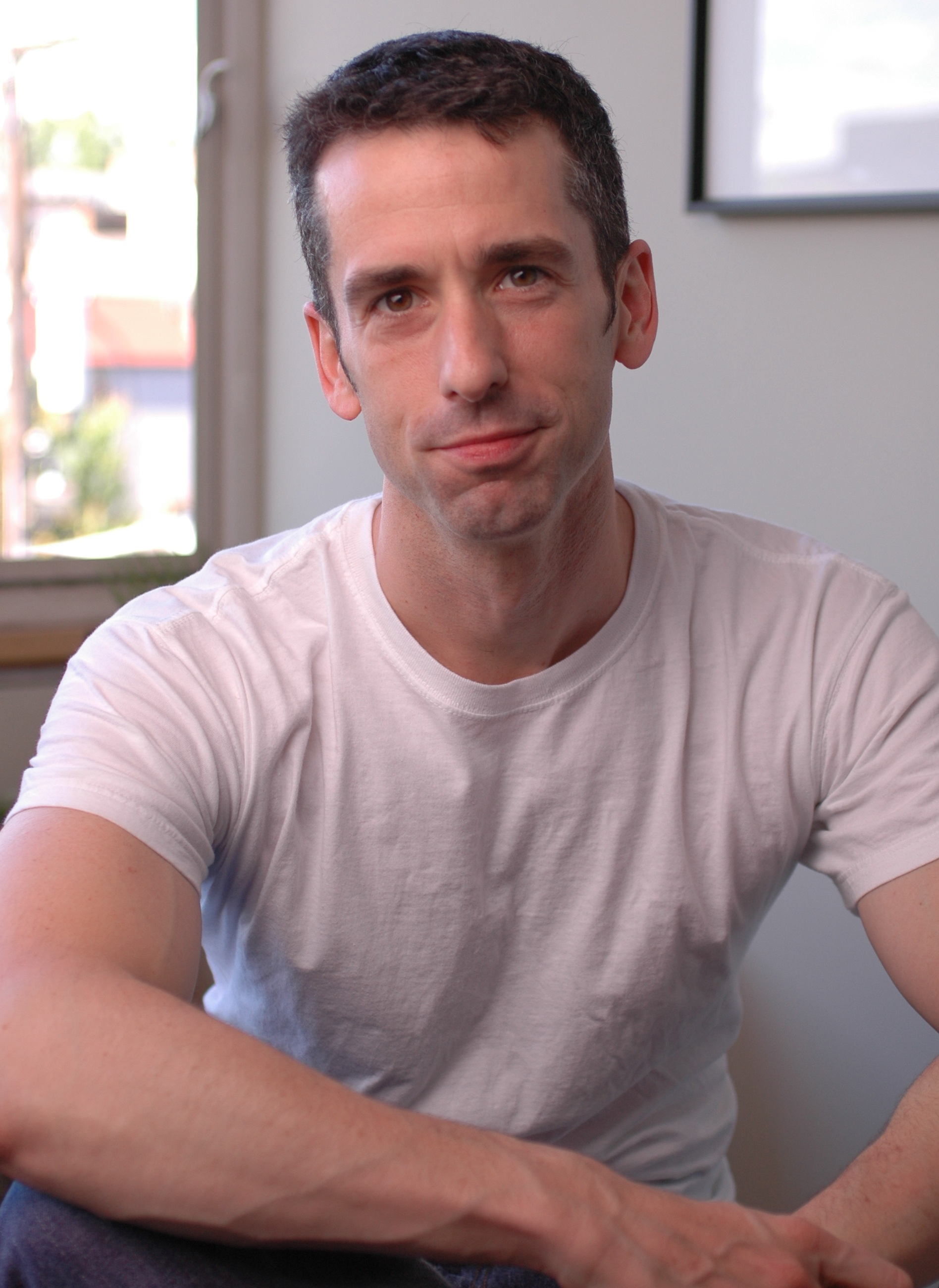
Dan Savage (2005)

It Gets Better: Coming Out, Overcoming Bullying, and Creating a Life Worth Living contains selections of writings addressed to teenagers within the LGBT community. Celebrities, ordinary individuals and teenagers submitted pieces for inclusion in the book, which includes over 100 essays, selected from 10,000 entries. Contributors to the work include finance advisor Suze Orman; comedic writer David Sedaris; United States Secretary of State Hillary Clinton; and President of the United States Barack Obama.

Dan Savage writes of his own life in the book,

Eight years after coming out, I would stumble into a rewarding and unlikely career as a sex-advice columnist, of all things, and somehow leverage that into a side gig as a potty-mouthed political pundit. And fifteen years after coming out, I would adopt a son with the love of my life — the man I would marry — and, with him at my side, present my parents with a new grandchild, my siblings with a new nephew.

Savage emphasizes the positive nature of his life in reflection on his past experiences,

Things didn't just get better for me. All of the gay, lesbian, bisexual, and transgender adults I knew were leading rich and rewarding lives. We weren't the same people and we didn't have or want the same things — gay or straight, not everyone wants kids or marriage; people pursue happiness in different ways — but we all had so much to be thankful for, and so much to look forward to. Our lives weren't perfect; there was pain, heartbreak, and struggle. But our lives were better. Our lives were joyful.

Civil rights activist Urvashi Vaid writes in the book,

The only reason big changes happen is when people like you and me decide to fight for things to change, when we take action to make things different. ... Social activism is all about optimism, even when you lose. The process of doing something about it all ... makes you feel better, like a sweaty dance to music you love.

Medical student Jake Kleinman contributed an essay, "From Scared to Proud: The Journey of a Gay Medical Student", about his experiences which led to his decision to come out to his friends whilst a senior at Colgate University. 24-year-old Taylor Bailey of Denton, Texas, wrote of his experiences during seventh grade, and his period of depression when he contemplated suicide:

The thing that really saved me was my sister – my little sister. She was only about two or three at the time and I loved her so much. She was my biggest fan. And she's who I would think about when I thought about killing myself. I realized I couldn't do that to her. Thank God, because I couldn't have seen then where I would end up now. If I could have, I would have understood that I just needed to get through these few years because much better things were waiting for me.

== Publication history ==
It Gets Better: Coming Out, Overcoming Bullying, and Creating a Life Worth Living was first published by Dutton on March 22, 2011, in hardcover format. An additional version as an e-book was published by Dutton in 2011. An Audible.com audio edition was released in April 2011 which ran 9 hours and 53 minutes; it was narrated by Paul Michael Garcia and Gavin Marguerite. Another audio version was released by Playaway Digital Audio. An audiobook version was released by Blackstone Audio, Inc. in May 2011 in MP3 format, as well as a CD version. A paperback edition is planned for release in February 2012.

== Reception ==
IndieBound reported that It Gets Better: Coming Out, Overcoming Bullying, and Creating a Life Worth Living reached 20th on a list of bestsellers in the United States, less than one week after it was published. The book reached spot 16 on The New York Times Best Seller list on April 10, 2011. By April 25, 2011, the book had sold approximately 24,000 copies, according to The New York Times. Mike Thomas of the Chicago Sun-Times wrote, "It Gets Better: Coming Out, Overcoming Bullying, and Creating a Life Worth Living — features handpicked and heartfelt essays from contributors famous and obscure, gay and straight."

== See also ==
- Gay, Lesbian and Straight Education Network
- LGBT-affirming religious groups
- LGBT community
- LGBT rights in the United States
- Teenage suicide in the United States
