= Catherine Taylor =

Catherine Taylor may refer to:

- Catherine Taylor (South African politician) (1914–1992)
- Catherine Stihler (born 1973), née Catherine Taylor, British Labour Party politician
- Catherine Taylor (orienteer) (born 1989), British orienteer

== See also ==
- Kathy Taylor (disambiguation)
- Katherine Taylor (disambiguation)
- Kathleen Taylor (disambiguation)
- Cathie Taylor (born 1944), Canadian-born singer of country and gospel music
- Katy Taylor (born 1989), figure skater
- Katie Taylor (born 1986), boxer
- Kate Taylor (disambiguation)
