= Skipping Towards Gomorrah =

Book by Dan Savage

- Book cover, 2003 ed.
- Author: Dan Savage
- Language: English
- Subject: Politics, Religion
- Publisher: Dutton Adult
- Publication date: 2002
- Publication place: United States
- Media type: Print
- Pages: 320
- ISBN: 0-525-94675-6
- OCLC: 49421653
- Preceded by: The Kid: What Happened After My Boyfriend and I Decided to Go Get Pregnant (1999).
- Followed by: The Commitment: Love, Sex, Marriage, and My Family (2005).

Skipping Towards Gomorrah: The Seven Deadly Sins and the Pursuit of Happiness in America is a non-fiction book by Dan Savage, first published in 2002 by Dutton. The book examines the concept of happiness in American culture, as obtained by indulging in each of the Seven Deadly Sins.

Skipping Towards Gomorrah was selected for inclusion in The Best American Sex Writing 2004, and won a Lambda Literary Award in 2003. The book received a favorable reception from reviews in Publishers Weekly, Library Journal, and Kirkus Reviews. A review in Flagpole Magazine was critical of the book's organization, and observed that the writing wandered a bit, while a review in Gay Today commented, "Those who agree with Savage's views will like his book while those who disagree will hate it; in either case there will be no converts."

== Contents ==
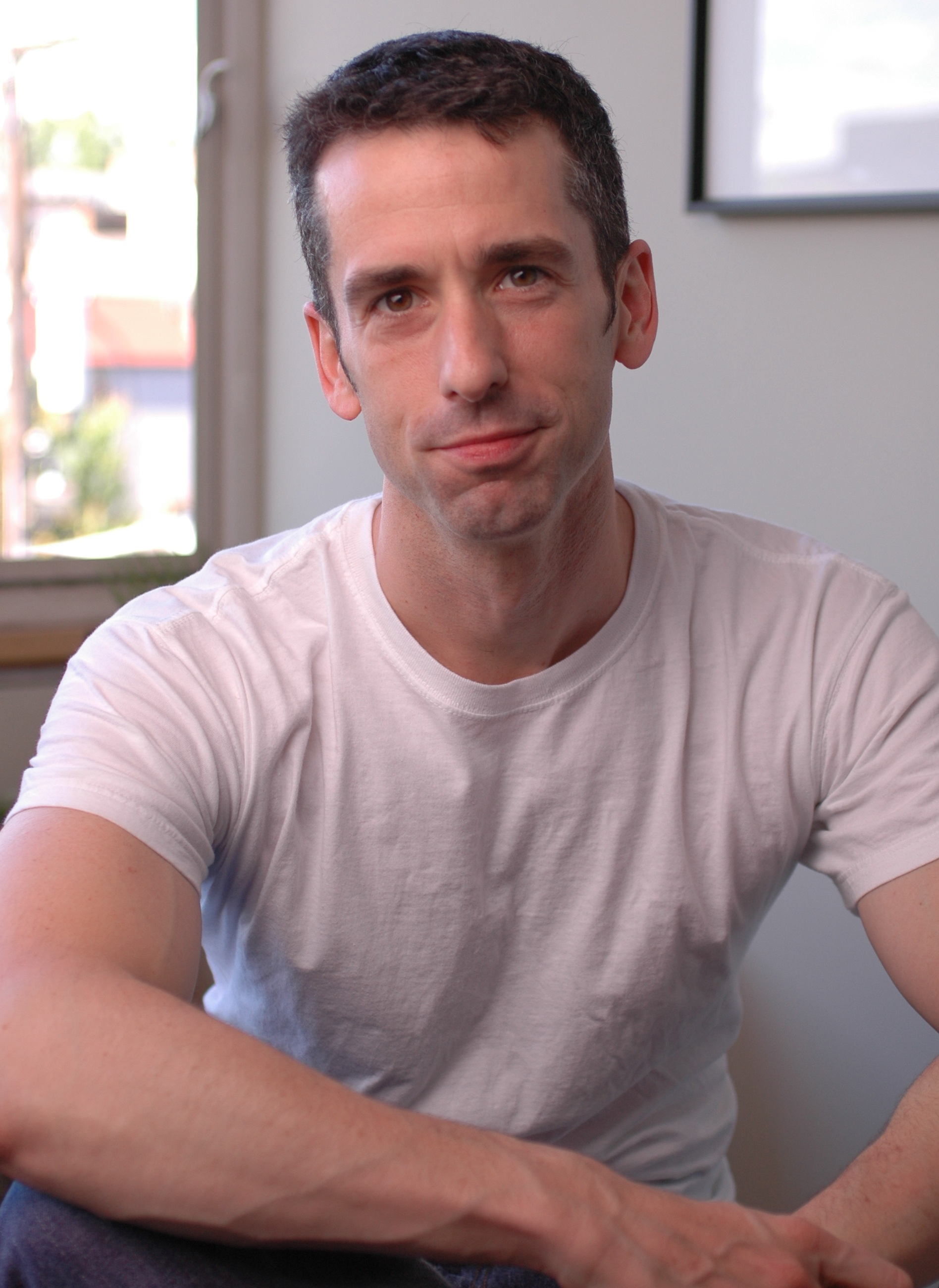
Dan Savage (2005)

The book's title is a reference to Robert Bork's 1996 book, Slouching Towards Gomorrah (itself a reference to Yeats's poem The Second Coming), in which Bork decried what he saw as modern moral corruption caused by liberalism, especially social liberalism. Skipping Towards Gomorrah examines the concept of happiness in American culture, as obtained by indulging in each of the Seven Deadly Sins. In each chapter, Savage explores a different subculture in an attempt to understand how its participants gain happiness, and contrasts this with religious conservatism. Regarding his experience of gambling, Savage notes, "You know the only thing worse than losing big the first time you go into a casino? Winning big." Savage writes, "The truly revolutionary promise of our nation's founding document is the freedom to pursue happiness-with-a-capital-H". The author asserts he is pointing out hypocritical behavior in the book, "Young people have finely tuned bullshit detectors, and nothing annoys people more than adult hypocrisy".

== Publication history ==
The book was first published by Dutton in 2002 in hardcover format. A subsequent edition was published by Plume, in 2003 in paperback format. Savage appeared on The O'Reilly Factor as part of the marketing for the book, and supported sex education.

== Reception ==
Skipping Towards Gomorrah was selected for inclusion in The Best American Sex Writing 2004, and won a 2003 Lambda Literary Award in the humor category. A review of the book in Publishers Weekly was positive and the review concluded, "On the whole, however, Savage hits the mark and gives advocates of personal and sexual liberty the hippest, sassiest voice they've had in a long time." A review in Library Journal noted, "His real strength is in blending pungent social commentary with the personal narrative. At least one of these pieces will undoubtedly land in an anthology for future students of the essay." The review concluded, "The explicit nature of this book will make it a difficult purchase for many libraries in the age of Ashcroft, but the justifying argument should be made that any library owning Bork's book needs this one as an antidote." Kirkus Reviews wrote, "Common sense is Savage’s strong suit, and he makes more of it than a preening moralist ever could." Kelly Darrah of The Gonzaga Bulletin noted, "'Skipping' does a powerful job of taking a raw look at the embarrassing facets of our society that we often will ourselves not to see. Savage forces us to reexamine what we've been taught about morality and what constitutes an 'ethical' decision."

A review by Flagpole Magazine writer Jyl Inov concluded, "This book wanders. It talks more about some sins than others and often takes a long time to get to a particular point. But in the end, it is wildly amusing and makes a lot of sense. Skipping Towards Gomorrah is not going to make converts of conservatives, but if they are willing to read, it just might make them think. As for everybody else, it is reaffirming and potentially motivating." In his book Reordered Love, Reordered Lives: Learning the Deep Meaning of Happiness, author David K. Naugle commented, "This book is an irreverent attack on the 'virtuecrats' who hypocritically impose their moral values on others." Writing in a review for Gay Today, Jesse Monteagudo observed, "Those who agree with Savage's views will like his book while those who disagree will hate it; in either case there will be no converts. Still, in a literary genre dominated by the Borks and Bennetts it is good to hear a dissenting voice. Reading Skipping Towards Gomorrah reminds us that there is still some sanity left in this world." Rebecca Flint of Entertainment Weekly wrote, "Skipping follows the writer as he tackles each of the seven deadlies, hanging out with everyone from gamblers to adulterers to the filthy rich. Lacing his anecdotes with persuasive arguments for the freedom to pursue life, liberty, and happiness in all its sinful forms, he takes readers on a journey that's as insightful as it is hilarious."

== See also ==
- Savage Love: Straight Answers from America's Most Popular Sex Columnist
