= Kate Taylor (British writer) =

British sex columnist

Kate Taylor is a British sex columnist, presenter, and author who has written for British media including The Times, the Evening Standard, The Observer, The Guardian, The Sun, the Daily Mirror, and the Daily Express.

In 1997, she joined GQ magazine and began writing the "Sex Life" column, a role she continued for the next five years.

She has published five books, including The Good Orgasm Guide, Life's Too Short for Tantric Sex, A Women's Guide to Sex, and co-authored The Wedding Survival Guide. In February 2007, Kate Taylor released her controversial book for Penguin, Not Tonight, Mr Right, where she told readers to wait six months before having sex with a new man.

Taylor has also worked as a presenter for television and podcasts. Taylor hosted the Channel 4 TV show Sex Tips for Girls and in 2007, hosted the BBC Radio 4 programme Generating Genius. She served as a producer for the radio programme Letters From Guantanamo, which received the Gold News Feature Award at the 25th Sony Radio Academy Awards.
