= It Gets Better Project =

American not-for-profit organisation

It Gets Better
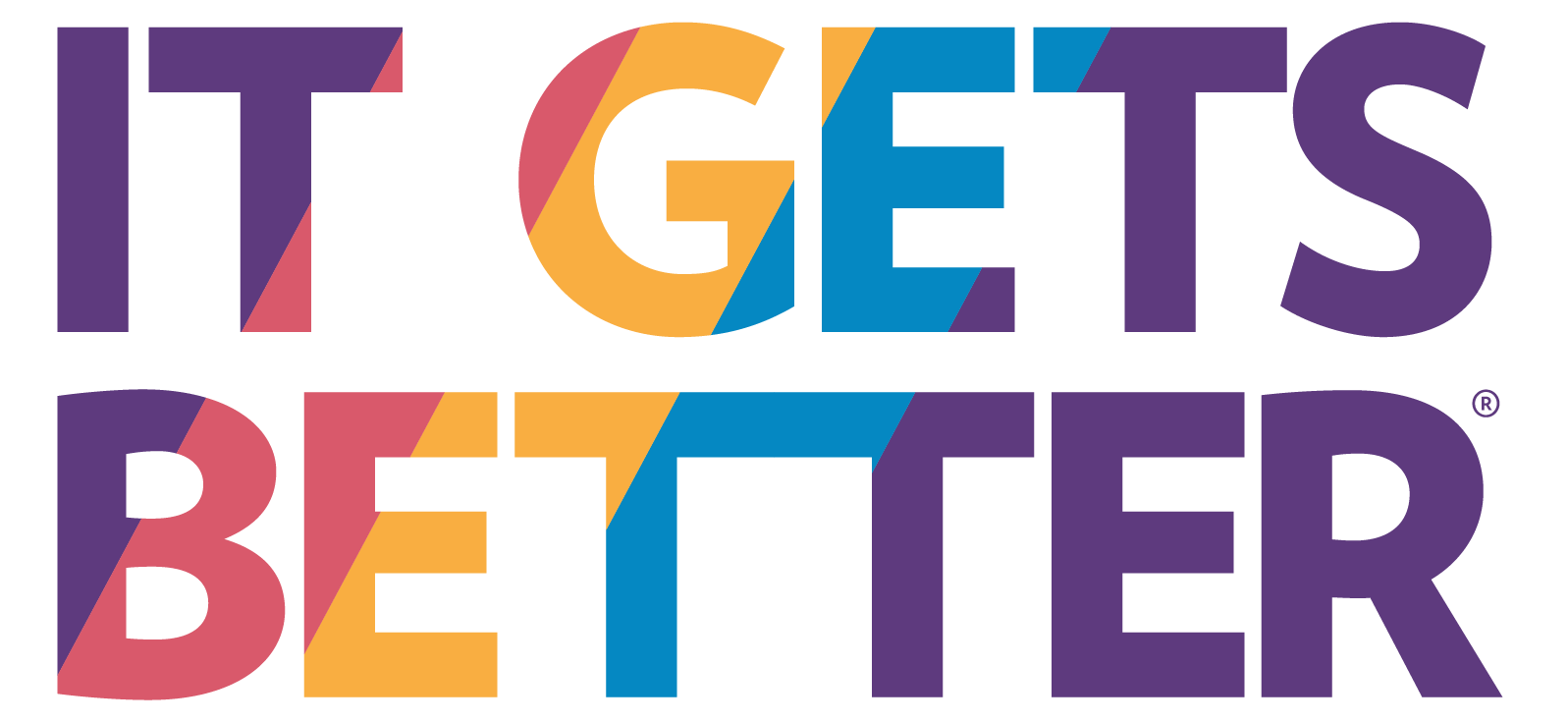
- Formation: 2010
- Founded: September 21, 2010; 16 years ago
- Founders: Dan Savage and Terry Miller
- Type: 501(c)(3)
- Headquarters: Los Angeles, California, United States
- Region served: Worldwide
- CEO and Executive Director: Brian Wenke
- Website: itgetsbetter.org
- Formerly called: It Gets Better Project

It Gets Better is an Internet-based 501(c)(3) nonprofit with a mission to uplift, empower, and connect lesbian, gay, bisexual, transgender, and queer (LGBTQ+) youth around the globe. It was founded in the United States by gay activist, author, media pundit, and journalist Dan Savage on September 1, 2010, in response to the suicides of teenagers who were bullied because they were gay or because their peers suspected that they were gay. Its goal is to prevent suicide by having gay adults convey the message that these teens' lives will improve. The project includes more than 50,000 entries from people of all sexual orientations, including many celebrities; the videos have received over 50 million views.

A book of essays from the project was released in March 2011. The project was given the Academy of Television Arts & Sciences Governor's Award at the 64th Primetime Creative Arts Emmy Awards for "strategically, creatively and powerfully utilizing the media to educate and inspire," according to the academy's chairman and CEO Bruce Rosenblum.

== Project history ==
Then-U.S. President Barack Obama's video contribution to the It Gets Better Project (2010)

The It Gets Better Project was founded by Savage in response to the suicide of Billy Lucas and other teenagers who were bullied because they were gay or perceived to be, such as with Raymond Chase, Tyler Clementi, Ryan Halligan, Asher Brown, and Seth Walsh. Reflecting on Lucas' suicide in his Savage Love column, Savage wrote, "I wish I could have talked to this kid for five minutes. I wish I could have told Billy that it gets better. I wish I could have told him that, however bad things were, however isolated and alone he was, it gets better."

Former U.S. President Barack Obama lent his voice to the project and its anti-bullying message during its infancy. On October 21, 2010, Obama contributed his own video saying in part, "We've got to dispel this myth that bullying is just a normal rite of passage; that it's just some inevitable part of growing up. It's not. We have an obligation to ensure that our schools are safe for all of our kids. And for every young person out there you need to know that if you're in trouble, there are caring adults who can help." President Obama and First Lady Michelle Obama would later host an anti-bullying conference in March 2011. Google Chrome backed the project as well, promoting its YouTube channel and airing a video ad for the project on television; that ad's first appearance came during a May 3, 2011 episode of Glee.

Today, It Gets Better is the world's largest storytelling effort to empower LGBTQ+ youth. Since 2022, It Gets Better distributed about $1.5 million to middle and high schools throughout the United States and Canada to fund projects that uplift and empower LGBTQ+ students. In 2023, It Gets Better was the first of several LGBTQ+ nonprofits to leave Twitter/X, citing a surge of hate speech and misinformation targeting queer and trans youth. In 2024, the organization dropped the Project from its name to reflect its "growth from a viral movement to a more comprehensive support system for queer youth." It is now known as It Gets Better.

== Book and television ==
In March 2011, E. P. Dutton published It Gets Better: Coming Out, Overcoming Bullying, and Creating a Life Worth Living, a book of essays edited by Dan Savage and Terry Miller that reflect the same theme as the web video project. The book contains more than 100 essays, either transcribed or expanded from the videos or original writings. Contributors include Jennifer Finney Boylan, Gregory Maguire, Meshell Ndegeocello, Michael Cunningham, Suze Orman, and David Sedaris. The book made the New York Times Best Seller list.

Two 1-hour It Gets Better TV specials, which focused on the project's mission and conveyed messages of support, aired in 2012. Broadcast on MTV and simulcast on LGBT-oriented sister network Logo, the specials had premiere airings on February 21 and October 9, 2012.

== Global affiliates ==
It Gets Better has affiliate organizations in Paraguay, Peru, Chile, Guatemala, the Dominican Republic, Mexico, Colombia, Panama, Argentina, Brazil, Portugal, Spain, Greece, Austria, Hungary, Russia, the United Kingdom, Canada, and India. The Peru, Chile, and Mexico organizations offer a service called Hora Segura (Safe Hour in English). These time slots have professionals volunteering to offer free psychological support. In Chile, this is provided through the Hora Segura app, while Mexico uses Meta's Messenger app. Peru uses both Messenger and WhatsApp.

Alongside six other LGBTQ organizations, the Chilean affiliate Todo Mejora (It Gets Better) formed the Front for Sexual Diversity in 2013. On the International Day Against Homophobia and Transphobia, the movement released their first public statement containing "proposals for the development of a fair, equal, plural and democratic society." In 2025, Todo Mejora was awarded the Human Rights Tulip by the Dutch government.

In 2018, It Gets Better Canada launched a petition to ban conversion therapy nationwide. The petition received over 58,000 signatures. In 2025, It Gets Better Canada and LG2 developed an app called GLO. The app provides a virtual pet and educational modules on topics like identifying stress and fighting cyberbullying. The app was created with funding from Canada's Department of Women and Gender Equality.

== See also ==
- It Gets Better Mexico
- List of suicides which have been attributed to bullying
