= Dan Savage =

American sex advice columnist and gay rights campaigner (born 1964)

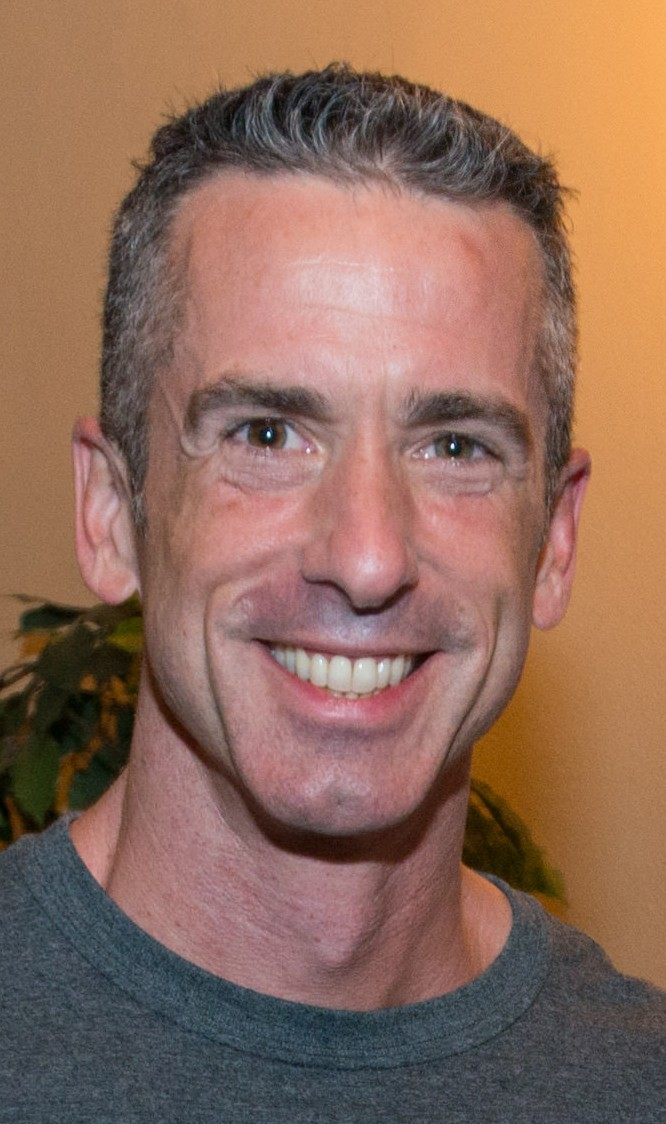
- Savage at Inforum, 2013
- Born: Daniel Keenan Savage; October 7, 1964 (age 62); Chicago, Illinois, U.S.
- Other name: Keenan Hollahan
- Education: University of Illinois Urbana-Champaign (BFA)
- Occupations: Author, media pundit, journalist, newspaper editor, sex advice columnist
- Years active: 1991–present
- Spouse: Terry Miller (m. 2005)
- Children: 1
- Website: https://savage.love

Daniel Keenan Savage (born October 7, 1964) is an American journalist, and LGBTQ community activist. He writes Savage Love, a relationship and sex advice column. In 2010, Savage and his husband, Terry Miller, began the It Gets Better Project to help prevent suicide among LGBTQ youth. He has also worked as a theater director, sometimes credited as Keenan Hollahan.

Born in Chicago to Catholic parents, Savage attended the University of Illinois at Urbana–Champaign where he received a Bachelor of Fine Arts degree in acting. After living in West Berlin from 1988 to 1990, he moved to Madison, Wisconsin, where he befriended Tim Keck, co-founder of The Onion. When Keck moved to Seattle, Washington, Savage moved as well to become an advice columnist for The Stranger, which Keck founded; he had offered Savage the position after Savage wrote a sample column which impressed him. Savage has since become a sex columnist and a vocal proponent of LGBTQ rights in the United States, voicing his advocacy through Savage Love, and a podcast version titled the Savage Lovecast. In 2001, Savage and his readership coined the term pegging to describe a woman anally penetrating a man with a strap-on dildo.

Outside of his writings and podcasts, Savage has advocated for progressive politics and advancing the rights of LGBTQ youth to prevent suicide in the community. He has opposed laws restricting pornography and the sale of sex toys. Savage has been featured on numerous television programs and news outlets, including Countdown with Keith Olbermann and Anderson Cooper 360.

Savage has attracted controversy over his comments and actions related to LGBTQ issues. He promoted the term santorum to define a by-product of sex after former senator Rick Santorum made anti-LGBTQ comments in 2003, and condemned the Church of Jesus Christ of Latter-day Saints for its support of California Proposition 8, which banned same-sex marriage in California. His activism and public speaking has brought praise from celebrities and politicians, including former president Barack Obama.

== Early life and education ==
Dan Savage was born in Chicago, Illinois, the son of Judith "Judy" (née Schneider), who worked at Loyola University, and William Savage Sr. He has German and Irish ancestry. The third of four children, he has two brothers and one sister. Savage was raised Catholic and attended Quigley Preparatory Seminary North, which he has described as "a Catholic high school in Chicago for boys thinking of becoming priests." Though Savage has stated that he considers himself "a wishy-washy agnostic" and an atheist, he continues to identify as "culturally Catholic".

Savage attended the University of Illinois at Urbana–Champaign, where he received a BFA in acting. He lived in West Berlin from late 1988 to 1990.

== Career ==
=== Savage Love ===
In 1991, Savage was living in Madison, Wisconsin, and working as a night manager at Four Star Fiction and Video (now Four Star Video Cooperative), a local video store that specialized in independent film titles. He befriended Tim Keck, co-founder of The Onion, who announced that he was moving to Seattle to help start an alternative weekly newspaper titled The Stranger. Savage "made the offhand comment that forever altered [his] life: 'Make sure your paper has an advice column—everybody claims to hate 'em, but everybody seems to read 'em'." Savage wrote a sample column, and to his surprise, Keck offered him the job.

Savage stated in a February 2006 interview in The Onion's A.V. Club (which published his column until 2021) that he began the column with the express purpose of providing mocking advice to heterosexuals, since most straight advice columnists were "clueless" when responding to letters from gay people. Savage wanted to call the column "Hey, Faggot!" in an effort to reclaim a hate word. His editors at the time refused his choice of column name, but for the first several years of the column, he attached "Hey, Faggot!" at the beginning of each printed letter as a salutation." In his February 25, 1999, column, Savage announced that he was retiring the phrase, claiming that the reclamation had been successful.

He has written in a number of columns about "straight rights" concerns, such as the HPV vaccine and the morning-after pill. In his November 9, 2005, column he wrote that "[t]he right-wingers and the fundies and the sex-phobes don't just have it in for the queers. They're coming for your asses too."

=== Theater ===
As a theater director, Savage (under the name Keenan Hollohan, combining his middle name and his paternal grandmother's maiden name) was a founder of Seattle's Greek Active Theater. Much of the group's work were queer interpretations of classic works, such as a tragicomic Macbeth with both the title character and Lady Macbeth played by performers of the opposite sex. In March 2001, he directed his own Egguus at Consolidated Works, a parody of Peter Shaffer's 1973 play Equus which exchanged a fixation on horses for a fixation on chickens.

Letters from the Earth (2003), also at Consolidated Works, was Savage's most recent production. Letters was a trimmed version of Mark Twain's The Diary of Adam and Eve. It received scathing reviews, including one from The Stranger - "My Boss's Show Stinks".

In 2010, an adaptation of Savage's book The Kid was produced as a musical Off-Broadway. The play was developed by librettist Michael Zam. Music for the play was composed by Andy Monroe, with lyrics by Jack Lechner. Savage was portrayed by Christopher Sieber. It was performed in Theatre Row, New York City, from The New Group, with director Scott Elliott. The Kid was the recipient of the BMI Foundation Jerry Bock Award for Excellence in Musical Theatre in 2009.

=== Media appearances ===
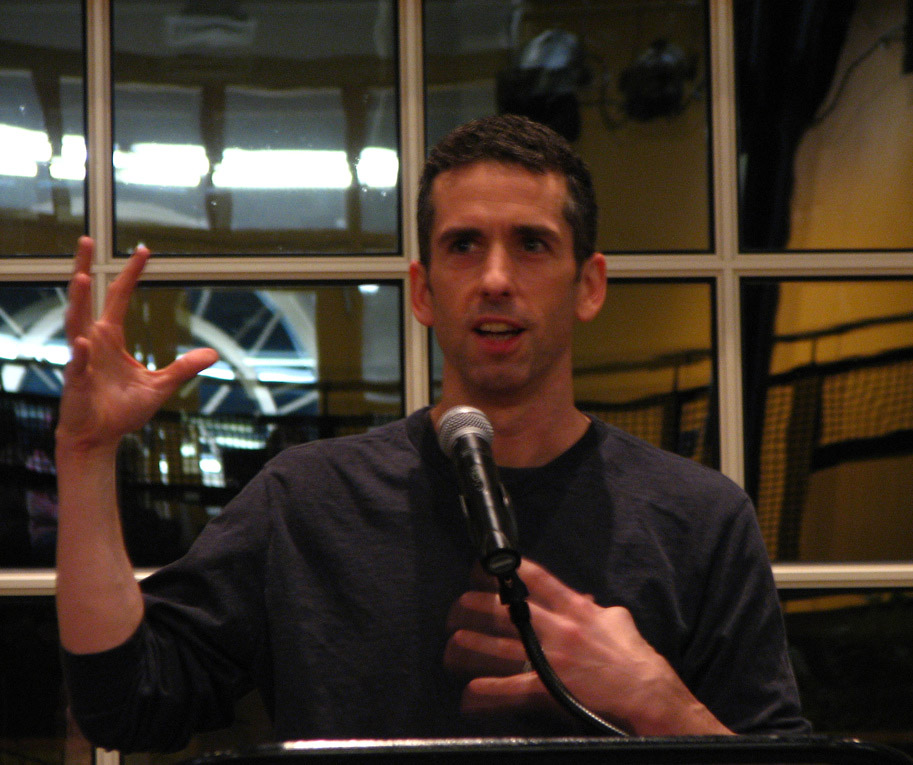
Speaking at Illinois Wesleyan University, 2007

In addition to writing a weekly column and four books, Savage has been involved in several other projects.

From 1994 until 1997, he had a weekly three-hour call-in show called Savage Love Live on Seattle's KCMU (now KEXP-FM). From 1998 to 2000, he ran the biweekly advice column Dear Dan on the news website abcnews.com.

He is now the editorial director of the weekly Seattle newspaper The Stranger, a promotion from his former position as The Stranger's editor-in-chief. Savage stars in Savage U on MTV, contributes frequently to This American Life and Out magazine, and acts as a "Real Time Real Reporter" on HBO's Real Time with Bill Maher. He has also made multiple appearances on MSNBC's Countdown with Keith Olbermann and CNN's Anderson Cooper 360, to discuss LGBTQ political issues, such as same-sex marriage and Don't Ask Don't Tell.

In 2014, he participated in Do I Sound Gay?, a documentary film by David Thorpe about stereotypes of gay men's speech patterns.

In 2016, he was the first guest of Twice Removed, a family history podcast hosted by A. J. Jacobs. In the episode, Savage's lineage was traced to Nan Britton, Paul Popham, and others.

In 2017, Savage was featured in Monogamish, a documentary directed by Tao Ruspoli exploring contemporary attitudes toward monogamy, marriage, and alternative relationship structures within American society.

=== Podcast ===
The Savage Lovecast is a weekly audio podcast based on the column Savage Love, available via iTunes and at the Stranger's website for free download. It features Savage answering anonymous questions left by callers on a voice recorder (answering machine). He often returns calls to questioners who give their phone numbers, and such phone calls are part of the podcast. He also consults with doctors, sex therapists, and other experts for answers to questions he calls "above my pay grade". There are frequent guest co-hosts, all of them sex-positive. It is routinely rated as the top podcast in the iTunes "Health" category and in the top 20 of all podcasts overall. A.V. Club listed the show as one of "The best podcasts of 2010" and later as one of "The best podcasts of 2013". The Atlantic listed the show as one of "The 50 Best Podcasts of 2016".

=== The Real O'Neals ===
Based on an idea by Savage (who also served as executive producer), the ABC television series The Real O'Neals, starring Noah Galvin, debuted in 2016. The series chronicles the lives of a close-knit, Irish-American Chicago Catholic family whose matriarch takes their reputation in the community very seriously. In the pilot episode, their perfect image is shattered when each family member has a secret revealed to the community: middle child Kenny is gay, oldest child Jimmy is anorexic, youngest child Shannon is running a money scam and might be an atheist, and parents Eileen and Pat are no longer in love and wish to divorce. The series lasted for two seasons before its cancellation.

== Personal life ==
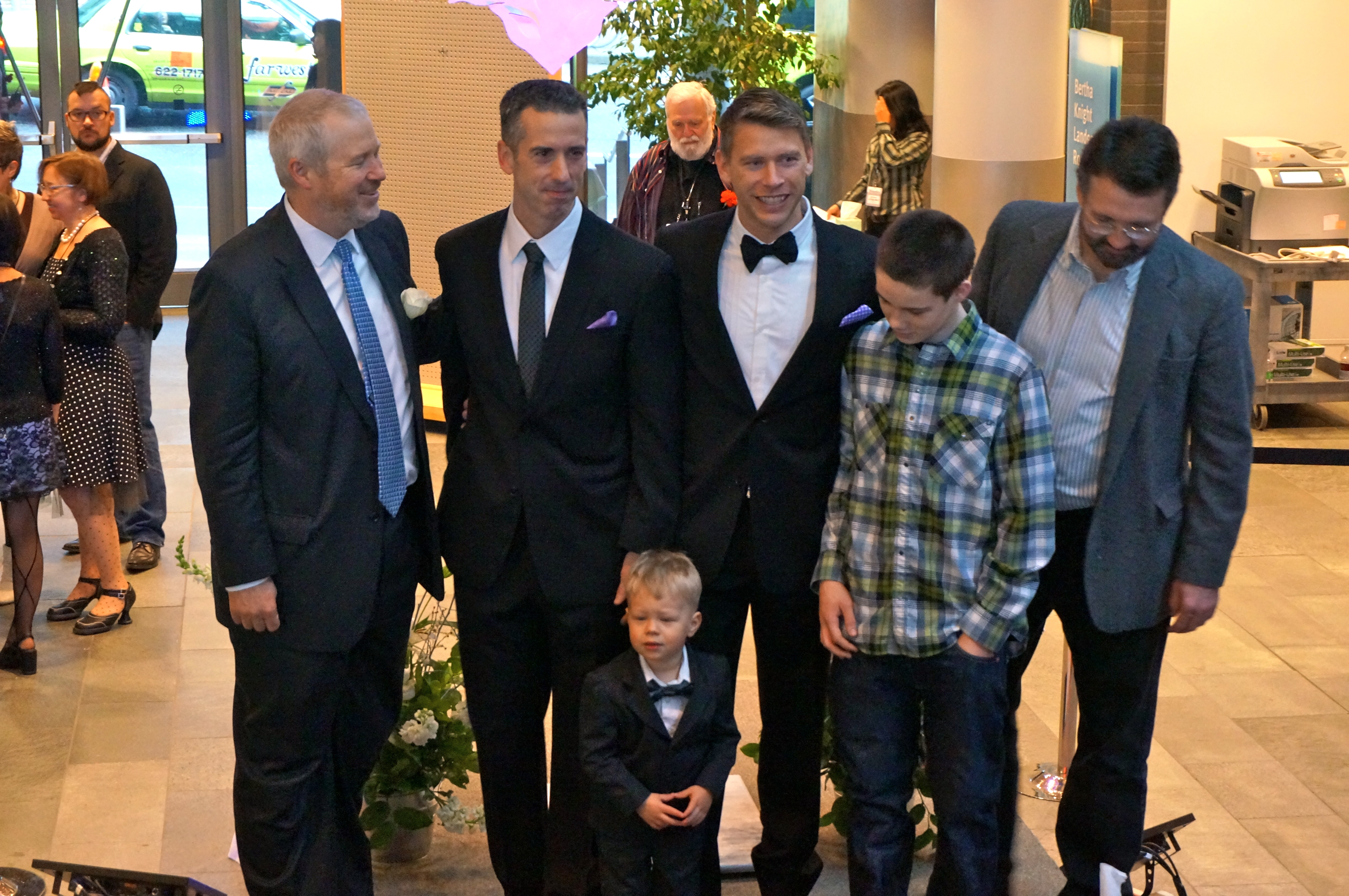
Dan Savage and Terry Miller's wedding at Seattle City Hall attended by Mayor Mike McGinn on December 9, 2012, the first day of same-sex marriage in Washington.

Savage married Terry Miller in Vancouver, British Columbia, in 2005. Following the 2012 legalization of same-sex marriage in Washington state, he and Miller were part of the first group of 11 couples to receive Washington state marriage licenses. Savage and Miller were married on December 9, 2012, at Seattle City Hall, opened on Sunday especially for the purpose of hosting the first same-sex weddings in Washington state, with Seattle Mayor Mike McGinn and others in attendance.

The couple has a son, whom they adopted as an infant c. 1998. Savage chronicled the experience of adopting their son in his 1999 book The Kid: What Happened After My Boyfriend and I Decided to Go Get Pregnant.

== Causes ==
=== It Gets Better Project ===
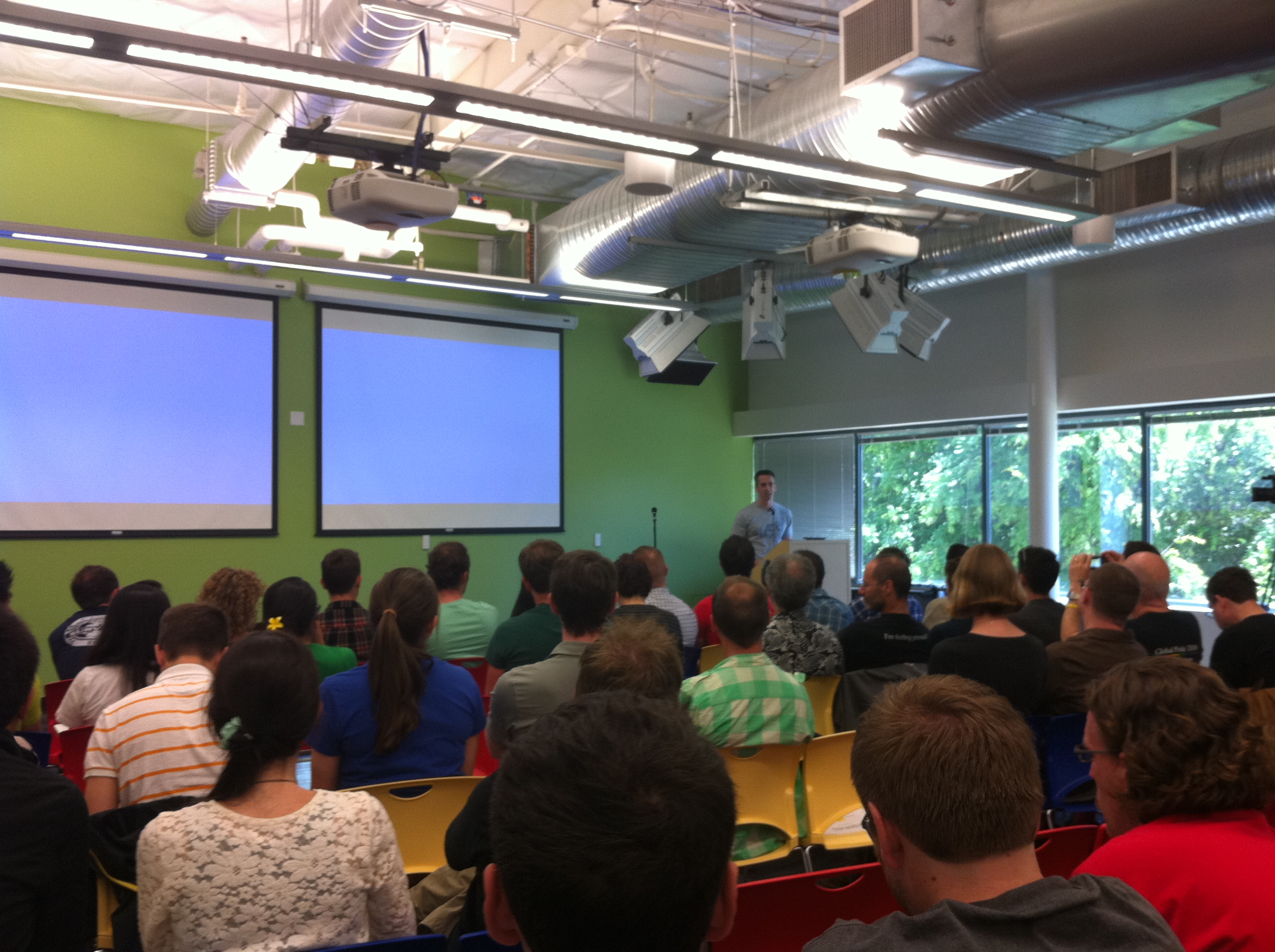
Savage speaking at Google about the It Gets Better Project

On September 21, 2010, Savage founded the It Gets Better Project following the suicide of 15-year-old Billy Lucas, who was bullied for his perceived sexual orientation. The project encourages adults, both LGBTQ and otherwise, to submit videos assuring gay teenagers that life can improve after bullying in early life. As of November 2013, the project had more than 50,000 user-created testimonials and had been viewed over 50 million times.

=== Hump pornography festival ===
Savage coordinates the annual Hump pornography festival, which is made up of clips of up to five minutes on any pornographic topic, submitted by viewers. Winning submissions are shown in theaters around the United States, providing a unique experience as straight, gay male, bi, lesbian, and fetish porn are all shown together, one after another. Savage publicly destroys the submissions after conclusion of the festival.

==== Campaign for the neologism santorum ====
After Rick Santorum, then a U.S. senator from Pennsylvania, made comments in 2003 to a reporter comparing homosexual sex to bestiality and incest, Savage assailed Santorum in his column. Later, he sponsored a contest that led to the term santorum being used to refer to "the frothy mixture of lube and fecal matter that is sometimes the byproduct of anal sex". Savage set up a website to publicize this application of the term. In 2010, Savage offered to take down his website if Rick Santorum would agree to donate US$5 million to a gay rights group. The organization, Freedom to Marry, advocates on behalf of same-sex marriage in the United States. Savage told Mother Jones in 2010, "If Rick Santorum wants to make a $5 million donation to [the gay marriage group] Freedom to Marry, I will take it down. Interest starts accruing now." Evan Wolfson, executive director of Freedom to Marry, responded in a statement to Metro Weekly, "Support for Freedom to Marry's national campaign would be welcome—and a good way for Rick Santorum to start cleaning up the discriminatory mess he and his companions have made." Santorum condemned the campaign and accused Savage of defaming him. Savage responded by further denouncing Santorum and accused him of propagating discrimination against the LGBTQ community through his viewpoints.

In 2009 Savage invited his readers to vote to define saddlebacking as "the phenomenon of Christian teens engaging in unprotected anal sex to preserve their virginities." He was protesting the vocal support given to California Proposition 8 by Rick Warren (pastor of Saddleback Church), and President Barack Obama's invitation to Warren to give the invocation at his inauguration. When Savage vowed to boycott Utah due to strong Mormon support for Proposition 8, the Salt Lake City Weekly dropped Savage's column.

=== Local issues ===
Savage's editorship of The Stranger has established him as a voice in local Seattle politics. His most high-profile commentary has been as a critic of the Teen Dance Ordinance and other crackdowns on all-ages events.

Savage argues that closing down supervised all-ages dance venues drives teens to boredom and reckless activities: "Places like Ground Zero and the Kirkland Teen Center are invaluable from a law enforcement point of view. They keep kids out of, say, 7-Eleven parking lots or the homes of friends whose parents are away."

== Views ==
=== U.S. politics ===
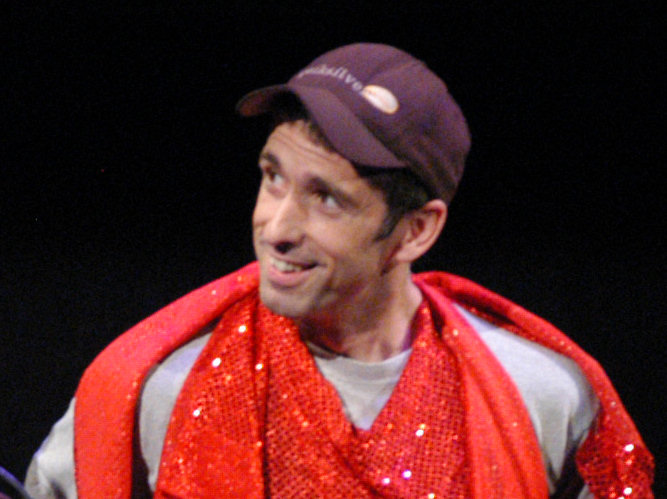
Savage at the 5th Avenue High School Musical Theatre Awards, 2006

Savage tends toward liberal political views, with pronounced contrarian and libertarian streaks. He frequently mentions political issues in his column, particularly issues that affect family planning, birth control, and sexuality. He often encourages readers to get involved and/or voice a positive or negative opinion about a politician or public official.

Savage has also opposed state legislation prohibiting the sale of sex toys. After an exposé by Kandiss Crone from WLBT in Jackson, Mississippi, precipitated the arrest and fining of an adult video store owner, Savage satirically suggested that readers send Crone any sex toys that they needed to dispose of.

In a 2006 interview with the Daily Pennsylvanian, Savage claimed that Carl Romanelli, who was briefly the Green Party's candidate for U.S. Senate in that year's election in Pennsylvania, was partially funded by state Republicans for a spoiler effect against Democrat Bob Casey Jr., and further stated that Romanelli "should be dragged behind a pickup truck until there's nothing left but the rope". He also said that if Romanelli, who had been disqualified from appearing on the general election ballot, was allowed back on the ballot, "someone should run him over with a truck". Immediately after the interview, Savage wrote, "I regret using that truck metaphor, and didn't mean it literally, and it was in poor taste, and I regret it."

On a 2011 episode of Real Time with Bill Maher, during a panel discussion on the debt limit increase negotiations between the U.S. Congress and President Barack Obama, Savage said, "I wish [the Republicans] were all fucking dead." He apologized for the comment on his blog later the same night, saying, "I don't feel that way", adding that his father voted Republican, and calling it "a stupid, rude, thoughtless remark, a flubbed expression of disgust".

==== 2000 Iowa caucuses ====
In January 2000, Savage traveled to Iowa to write about the state's presidential caucuses for Salon. He wrote that he had planned "to follow one of the loopy conservative Christian candidates around—[Gary] Bauer or [Alan] Keyes—and write something insightful and humanizing about him, his campaign, and his supporters", but he was so angered by remarks that Bauer made in opposition to same-sex marriage that he abandoned the idea.

Instead, Savage, who had been sick with influenza, said that he volunteered for the Bauer campaign with the intent to spread his flu to the candidate and his supporters. He claimed to have licked numerous items in the campaign office, including doorknobs, office supplies, and coffee cups, and later covered a pen in his saliva before handing it to Bauer. Camille Paglia, who also contributed to Salon at the time, called his described behavior "sociopathic", and the publication said that they did not "condone or endorse" his actions. Savage later said that the article was exaggerated for comedic effect, stating that the anecdote about "licking doorknobs" was fictitious, and that he was "no longer contagious" by the time he joined the campaign team.

Savage also reported registering and participating in the Iowa Republican caucus, which was illegal, as he was not an Iowa resident. He pleaded guilty to a misdemeanor charge of fraudulent voting in a caucus, and was sentenced to a year's probation, 50 hours of community service, and a $750 fine.

=== Other remarks ===
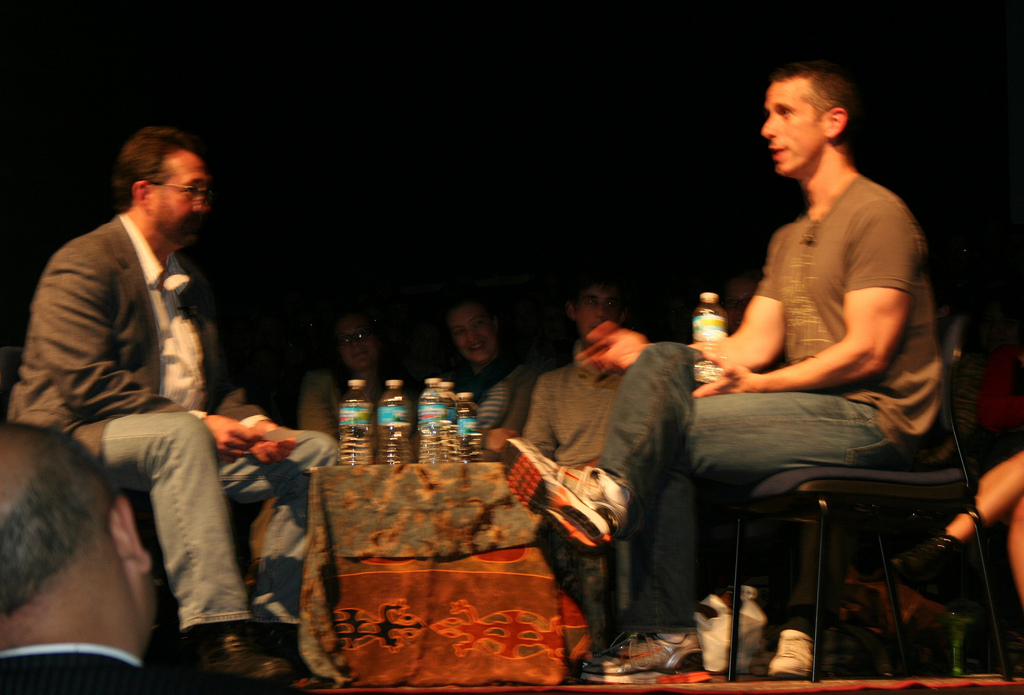
Dan Savage discussing sex education with his brother, Bill Savage, Northwestern University Senior Lecturer in English (2010)

==== Iraq War ====
Savage initially supported the Iraq War and advocated military action against other Middle Eastern states, including Iran and Saudi Arabia, saying, "Islamo-fascism is a regional problem, like European fascism—and the Middle East [has] to be remade just as Europe was remade". However, one week before the war began, Savage spoke against it, citing the inability of President George W. Bush to form a convincing case and sway the UN and NATO allies. By 2005 he deemed the situation "hopeless" and advocated an immediate troop withdrawal.

Savage describes his view toward family as "conservative". He has, however, expressed skepticism of "simplistic" views of monogamy. In response to a letter asking "Is the AIDS crisis over?" Savage, in his October 22, 1997 column, answered simply, "Yes". Several weeks of columns were devoted in whole or in part to discussion of the issue. Savage also opposes the tactics of the war on drugs, and opposes the prohibition of certain controlled substances.

==== Outing ====
In 2006, Savage said that outing is "brutal and it should be reserved for brutes", writing it should not be done outside of particular circumstances, such as a closeted person publicly advocating against gay rights.

==== Comments on child sexuality and NAMBLA ====
On the topic of child sexuality, Savage said in 2001:

We live in a culture that's hysterical about children and assumes they have no sexual agency or desire. But anyone who can remember what they were like when they were 11 knows that kids are sexual, and whether it was messing around with their cousin, playing doctor with their neighbor, or making passes at people 10 years older, they were horny. So NAMBLA steps out to articulate all this, albeit in its usual highly dysfunctional and creepy way, and because we know what they say to be true on this issue, we've got to label them as insane perverts. Any attempt at rational discussion about youth sexuality and intergenerational sex is simply shouted down.... The problem with NAMBLA is that it packages reasonable arguments about teen sexuality and age-of-consent laws with irrational, insane arguments about 7-year-olds. That's why the group is where it is today.

==== Comments on child sex abuse ====
Savage has spoken out against child sexual abuse. In 2017, when Kevin Spacey was accused of attacking then-14 year old Anthony Rapp while drunk, Spacey released a statement which included coming out as gay. Savage responded that there is "no amount of drunk or closeted that excuses or explains away assaulting a 14-year-old child".

==== Comments on fat shaming ====
In 2011, Lindy West published a piece in The Stranger criticizing Savage, her boss at the time, for repeated comments about fat people in his columns, such as "rolls of exposed flesh are unsightly", which she called "a cruel, subjective opinion", concluding "you need to understand that shaming an already-shamed population is, well, shameful." This incident was later fictionalized in the Hulu TV series Shrill.

==== Comments on anti-bullying ====
Savage also came under scrutiny for an anti-bullying speech he gave in 2012, to the National High School Journalism Convention, in which he encouraged the attending students to "learn to ignore the bullshit in the Bible about gay people", prompting some students to leave the auditorium. Savage apologized on April 29 for calling the walkout "a pansy-assed move", saying, "I wasn't calling the handful of students who left pansies (2,800+ students, most of them Christian, stayed and listened), just the walkout itself." Savage stood by the central point of his speech.

==== Comments on transgender issues ====
In 2011, J. Bryan Lowder of Slate stated wrote Savage "often takes heat for his less-than-refined statements on issues like the existence of male bisexuality, the responsibility of asexuals to 'come out' before dating, and, indeed, certain issues surrounding transgenderism." Savage has repeatedly been the focus of controversy for his use of slurs regarding the transgender community, other remarks regarding trans issues, and for claiming as a joke that Rob McKenna, who was attorney general of Washington from 2005 to 2013, is a transgender man, though he is not. He has been glitter bombed three times, twice in 2011 and once in 2012, by protesters who alleged that he is transphobic, among other accusations.

In 2014, during a seminar at the University of Chicago about social media, Savage discussed his past use of the word "tranny". He objected to a student's request that he use the phrase "T-slur" instead, and gave examples of other slurs. Some students criticized him, claiming that he tried to make the student feel threatened and uncomfortable. A University representative said, "A guest used language that provoked a spirited debate. The speaker was discussing how hurtful words can be repurposed and used to empower; at no point did he direct any slurs at anyone." Savage later thanked the University for standing up for him and demanded an apology from those who had accused him of hatred towards trans people.

== Works ==
In addition to his advice column, Savage has written four books, edited one book, and authored various op-ed pieces in The New York Times.

== Awards ==
Year	Work	Award	Organization	Result
1999	The Kid: What Happened After My Boyfriend and I Decided to Go Get Pregnant	PEN West Award for Excellence in Creative Nonfiction	PEN Center USA	Won
2003	Skipping Towards Gomorrah: The Seven Deadly Sins and the Pursuit of Happiness in America	Lambda Literary Award	Lambda Literary Foundation	Won
2004	Skipping Towards Gomorrah: The Seven Deadly Sins and the Pursuit of Happiness in America	The Best American Sex Writing 2004	Running Press	Featured selection
2011	It Gets Better Project	Webby Award for Special Achievement	International Academy of Digital Arts and Sciences	Won
2011	It Gets Better Project	Anthony Giffard "Make the Change" Award	Master of Communications in Digital Media program, University of Washington	Won
2013	It Gets Better Project	Bonham Centre Award	The Mark S. Bonham Centre for Sexual Diversity Studies University of Toronto	Won
2013	Advocacy of separation of church and state and work for LGBT youth	2013 Humanist of the Year	The American Humanist Association	Won

== See also ==
- Death-grip syndrome
