= List of advice podcasts =

This is a list of advice podcasts.

Entries are ordered by their released dates of the first episode.

== List ==
Podcast	Year	Host(s)	Produced by	Ref
You and Yours	1970	Winifred Robinson, Peter White, Louise Minchin, Shari Vahl	BBC Radio 4	
Savage Lovecast	2006	Dan Savage	The Stranger	
Case Notes	2007	Mark Porter	BBC Radio 4	
Midwest Teen Sex Show	2007	Nikol Hasler and Britney Barber	Independent	
Employee of the Month	2010	Catie Lazarus	Slate	
My Brother, My Brother and Me	2010	Justin McElroy, Travis McElroy, and Griffin McElroy	Maximum Fun	
If I Were You	2013	Jake Hurwitz and Amir Blumenfeld	Spotify	
Mürmur	2014	Uluç Ülgen	Independent	
Another Round	2015	Tracy Clayton and Heben Nigatu	BuzzFeed	
Invisibilia	2015	Kia Miakka Natisse and Yowei Shaw	National Public Radio	
Dear Hank & John	2015	Hank Green and John Green	Independent	
Unqualified	2015	Anna Faris	Independent	
Dopey	2016	Dave Manheim and Chris	Independent	
Why Won't You Date Me?	2017	Nicole Byer	Team Coco	
Where Should We Begin? With Esther Perel	2017	Esther Perel	Esther Perel Global Media	
Life Kit	2018	Marielle Segarra	National Public Radio	
Call Her Daddy	2018	Alexandra Cooper and Sofia Franklyn	Barstool Sports	
Were You Raised By Wolves?	2019	Nick Leighton and Leah Bonnema	Independent	
Adulting	2019	Michelle Buteau and Jordan Carlos	WNYC Studios	
The Two Norries	2020	James Leonard and Timmy Long	Independent	
Am I Normal? With Mona Chalabi	2021	Mona Chalabi	TED	
