= Donkey Punch =

Donkey punch is a slang term for punching someone hard on the back of their head whilst having sex with them

Donkey punch may also refer to:

- Donkey puncher, slang term from the 1920s for operator of a small steam-powered winch used in logging
- Donkey punch (cocktail), a rum-based drink with orange juice and ginger ale
- Donkey Punch (2005 film), an adult film
- "Donkey Punch", a 2006 episode from season 2 of Robot Chicken
- Donkey Punch (novel), 2007 novel by Ray Banks
- Donkey Punch (2008 film), a British horror film
