= Gag Factor =

Pornographic film series

- Created by: Jeff Steward & Mike Norton, Director Jim Powers
- Original work: Gag Factor 2011
- Owner: JM Productions
- Years: 2000–present

Films and television
- Film(s): See below

Gag Factor is a series of pornographic films made by JM Productions featuring deep throating (irrumatio).

The first film was released in 2000. The series won the AVN Award for 'Best Oral-Themed Series' in 2003 and 2004. In October 2007, one of Gag Factor distributors, Five Star DVD, was found guilty by an Arizona jury of transporting obscene materials, including a Gag Factor title, across state lines.

== Videography ==
Title	Producer	Year	Director	Cast
Gag Factor	JM Productions	2000	Jim Powers	Briana Banks, Eva Moore, Alana Evans, Gwen Summers, Bridgette Kerkove, Zarina, Gauge, Suzanne Storm, Laura Lee, Holly Landes, Trevor.
Gag Factor 2	JM Productions	2000	Jim Powers	Sophie Evans, Mandy Mystery, Tina Cheri, Jill, Regina Sharp, Dolly Golden, Billie Britt, Dyn-a-mite, Gia Regency, Adriana Sage.
Gag Factor 3	JM Productions	2000	Jim Powers	Kitty Marie, Kiki Daire, Sinn Airyan, Alysin Embers, Kat Langer, Shyann Mitchell, Princess, Allysin Chaynes, Kiss, Mia Domore, Molly Rome, Brian Surewood, Dick Nasty, Johnny Thrust, Mark Vegga, Mr. Pete, Shaggy.
Gag Factor 4	JM Productions	2001	Jim Powers	Kristy Love, Trinity Max, Brandi Lyons, Sabrina Jade, Michele Raven, Lainey, Sara Bernat, Scarlette, Rhea, Brian Surewood, Herschel Savage, Johnny Thrust, Scott Lyons.
Gag Factor 5	JM Productions	2001	Jim Powers	Aurora Snow, Brittany Blue, Cinder Golds, Emerald, Tanya Storm (as Katanya Blade), Kianna Dior, Mocha, Olivia Saint, Shay Sights, Brian Surewood, Jay Ashley, Johnny Thrust, Scott Lyons.
Gag Factor 6	JM Productions	2001	Jim Powers	Alaina, Angelica Sin, Catalina, Cumisha Amado, Kikki Encina, Kimmy Kahn, Mariesa Arroyo, Misty Mendez, Misty Parks, Sharon Wild, Brett Rockman, John Strong, Johnny Thrust, Rich Handsome, Tony Eveready.
Gag Factor 7	JM Productions	2002	Jim Powers	Alexia Riley, Barbi Blazer, Belle, Bisexual Britni, Jen X., Kaylynn, Kelly Warner, Randi Storm, Ravika, Ryan Meadows, Tracy Mathis, Brian Surewood, Jay Ashley.
Gag Factor 8	JM Productions	2002	Jim Powers	Aimee Tyler, Autumn Haze, Brandy Starz, Heidi Ryan, Kelli Sparks, Kiki Daire, Miasia, Sherilyn, Brian Surewood, Jay Ashley, Johnny Thrust, Marty Romano.
Gag Factor 9	JM Productions	2002	Jim Powers	Alecia Knight, Alexandra Quinn, Celeste Stevens, Erika Kole, Fiona Cheeks, Layne Young, Lena Ramon, Lil Ass, Miasia, Misty Parks, Sin-nye, Johnny Thrust, Julian St. Jox, Rafe.
Gag Factor 10	JM Productions	2002	Jim Powers	Ashley Blue, Cailey Taylor, Chloe Dior, Drew Allen, Lizzy Liques, Promise, Saphire Rae, Tabitha Blue, Vanessa Jay, Wanda Play, Johnny Thrust, Marc Cummings, Marty Romano, Mr. Pete, Trent Tesoro, Tyler Wood.
Gag Factor 11	JM Productions	2003	Jim Powers	Cherry Poppens, Egypt, Gen Padova, Misty Mason (as Japan), Kitty, Lucy Lee, Malorie Marx, Rio Mariah, Sugar Kane, Valoria Rose, Venus, Dominique Dane (as Xylina), Byron Long, Johnny Thrust, Mr. Pete, Scott Lyons.
Gag Factor 12	JM Productions	2003	Jim Powers	Amber Roxx, Ava Devine, Carolyn Monroe, Crystal Ray, Honey, Kody Coxxx (as Honey), Jada Fire, Kitty Johnson, Maggie Star, Roxy, Taylor Fox, Vikki Vogue, Dick Nasty, Jay Ashley, Johnny Thrust, Mr. Pete, Rich Handsome, Rick Masters, Scott Lyons, The Assistant
Gag Factor 13	JM Productions	2003	Jim Powers	Ariana Jollee, Ciera Sage, Emily Davinci, Haley Paige (as Haley), Hollie Stevens, Jasmine Lynn, Lisa Sparxxx, Sarah Jordan, Soma, Tyler Houston, Vanessa, Andrew Andretti (as Andrew Rivera), Buster Good, Jay Ashley, Johnny Thrust, Mr. Pete, Scott Lyons.
Gag Factor 14	JM Productions	2003	Jim Powers	Audrey Hollander, Daphne Rosen, Gia Paloma, Jamie Brooks, Kami Andrews, Lena Juliett, Nicki Hunter, Renee Pornero, Taylor Rain, Vic Sinister (as Victoria Sin), Andrew Andretti, Chris Charming, Dirty Harry, Johnny Thrust, Juan Cuba, Julian St. Jox, Kris Slater, Mr. Pete, Otto Bauer, Rick Masters, Steve Taylor
Gag Factor 15	JM Productions	2004	Jim Powers	Antonette, Ashley Blue, Dominique Swift, Flower Tucci, Heather Gables, Julie Night, Katrina Kraven, Kerri Kravin, Melanie X., Jack Hammer, Johnny Thrust, Juan Cuba, Kid Jihad, Otto Bauer, Rick Masters, Scott Lyons.
Gag Factor 16	JM Productions	2004	Jim Powers	Alisha, Ashley Haze, Camille, Genesis Skye, Kristana, Mary Jane, Shayna Knight, Trinity James, Tyla Wynn, Vanessa Lane, Johnny Thrust, Otto Bauer, Scott Lyons.
Gag Factor 17	JM Productions	2005	Jim Powers	Alex Dane, Ashley Blue, Hillary Scott, Isabel Ice, Kelly Wells, Layla Rivera, Megan Martinez, Missy Monroe, Persia DeCarlo, Stacy Thorn, Tiffany Holiday, Dirty Harry, Jay Ashley, Johnny Thrust, Scott Lyons, Trent Tesoro.
Gag Factor 18	JM Productions	2005	Jim Powers	Alektra Blue, Angela Stone, Chelsea Zinn, Christie Lee, Eve Lawrence (as Eve Laurence), Georgia Peach (as Georgia X.), Jasmine Tame, Laycee James, Stephanie Wylde, Tiffany Rayne, Jessi Castro (as Tiger), Jenner, Johnny Thrust, Rick Masters, Trent Tesoro.
Gag Factor 19	JM Productions	2005	Jim Powers	Camilla, Cindy Crawford, Haley Scott, Miss Meadow, Nicole Brazzle, Ruby Red, Sierra Sinn, Suzie Ink, Trisha Reed, Trista Tanner, Violet Hughes, Jenner, Johnny Thrust, Julian St. Jox, Rick Masters, Scott Lyons.
Gag Factor 20	JM Productions	2006	Jim Powers	Chelsie Rae, Naudia Nyce, Kylee King, Amber Rayne, Jenna Presley, Courtney Simpson, Cassidy Blue, Victoria Sweet, Alena, Aaliyah Jolie.
Gag Factor 21	JM Productions	2006	Jim Powers	Aaralyn Barra, Alexa Lynn, Allie Steal, Baby Dee, Hailey Young, Kylie Haze, Lena Juliett, Sasha Knox, Tiffany Meadows, Tory Lane.
Gag Factor 22	JM Productions	2006	Jim Powers	Alicia Angel, Ashley Blue, Frankie Bee, Gia Gold, Kaci Star, Katja Kassin, Michelle Honey, Tabatha Tucker, Tobi Pacific, Vanessa Lynn.
Gag Factor 23	JM Productions	2006	Jim Powers	Adriana Davis, Brandi Lace, Carly Parker, Jersey Cummings, Kiwi Ling, Lexi Bardot, Maribel, Sarah Jane Ceylon (as Sarah Jane Leylon), Scarlett Summers, Violet Murphy, Seth Dickens.
Gag Factor 24	JM Productions	2007	Jim Powers	Aiden Star, Barbie Love, Claire Dames, Katie Rae, Kaylee Sanchez (as Kaylee Love Cox), Luckey Ross (as Luckey), Melrose Foxxx, Naomi Cruise, Naudia Brown, Renae Cruz, Riley Shy.
Gag Factor 25	JM Productions	2007	Jim Powers	Cosette Angelique, Crissy Moon, Harley Valley, Jade Davin, Jennifer Dark, Jordin Skye, Kayla Synz, Lisa Marie, Megan Reece, Misty Stone, Veronica Stone.
Gag Factor 26	JM Productions	2007	Jim Powers	Katrina Angel, Eden DeGarden, Jaelyn Fox, Chyanne Jacobs, La'rin Lane, Kyanna Lee, Sophia Lynn, Rosario Stone, Chavon Taylor, Jessica Valentino, Niya Yu.
Gag Factor 27	JM Productions	2008	Jim Powers	Aline, Anita Blue, Brooke Scott, Gabriella Romano, Holly Wellin, Iris Reyes, Kira Silver, Page Adams, Ruby Rider (as Ruby Ryder), Amanda Blue (as Vanessa Vexxx).
Gag Factor 28	JM Productions	2008	Jim Powers	Bailey Brooks, Cece Stone, Eve Nicholson, Jackie Avalon, Jessica Bangkok, Kenzi Marie, Perish, Tanner Mayes, Tatiana Kush, Tianna, Dirty Harry, Jenner, Johnny Thrust, Otto Bauer, Seth Dickens.
Gag Factor 29	JM Productions	2009	Jim Powers	Aza Haze, Ami Emerson, Emma Heart, Jackie Daniels, Kiera King, Kylee Lovit, Liliana Moreno, Lindsey Meadows, Nicole Ray, Nikki Rhodes.
Gag Factor 30	JM Productions	2009	Jim Powers	Alexa Jordan, Audrianna Angel, Capri Anderson, Jasmine Jolie, Jenna Moretti (as Jayden Williams), Kacey Jordan, Katie St. Ives, Lyla Storm, Natalie Norton, Shaina Beverly.
Gag Factor 31	JM Productions	2009	Jim Powers	Cherry Ferretti, Elizabeth Ann, Evie Delatosso, Heidi Mayne, Hollie Monroe, Melody Nakai, Natasha Nice, Sasha Knox, Scarlett Pain, Violet Monroe
Gag Factor 32	JM Productions	2010	Jim Powers	Billi Ann, Chastity Lynn, Darcy Tyler, Jamie Elle, Diana Prince, Lucky Starr, Megan Vaughn, Mya Nichole, Stephanie Cane, Tara Lynn Foxx
Gag Factor 33	JM Productions	2011	Jim Powers	Vicki Chase, Jayme Jaymes, Kendall Kennedy, Angelica Raven, Aarielle Alexis, Alexa Cruz, Brooklyn Bailey, Missy Mathers, Amanda Blow, Domino Aries
Gag Factor 34	JM Productions	2013	Jim Powers	Amber Rayne, Ashley Blue, Charlotte Vale, Hillary Scott, Katie Gold, Missy Monroe, Moxxie Maddron, Violet Monroe
