= List of Super Trio series games =

The following is a list of games taken from the Super Trio series.

== Games ==
Name of game	Objectives/format	Season
Prize Selection	Shorter segments where contestants select prizes/gifts after a round of games are played. Format varies, such as choosing a celebrity's portrait on a large panel, kicking slippers through a paper screen, throwing chalkboard erasers at a chalkboard. Audience members are sometimes chosen to participate as well.	1,2,3,4,5,
Charades / Descriptions	Contestants are divided into teams. Some member(s) stand in a small room with a descending door (similar to that of a garage), and have to describe words shown on a screen located behind their partners, who are standing/sitting a short distance away. The door slowly descends over a period of time; this usually leads to the describers comically crouching or lying down on the floor in order to extend their round. Games of traditional charades have also been played in this format. Some variations had contestants rotating between the describing role and the guessing role within a single round. In season 8, the person describing the words can only speak English. The screen they look at tells them which English words they cannot use. The other teammates must give the answer in Cantonese. In some cases, contestants who are less fluent in Cantonese than English are made to speak Cantonese instead, with the other players guessing the phrase in English. Instead of a descending door, this game is sometimes seen with sliding doors. In season 9, two people go up, and one of them has to run on a treadmill, which increases its speed as the game goes on. If they slip and fall, their turn is over, even if time has not run out.	1,2,3,4,5,
Guess Who?	Celebrities, arranged in a 3x2 grid on a makeshift gambling table, make a video cameo (directed to the theme/question; such as "Who has the biggest chest size") to try and sway the contestants into thinking they are the correct choice for the theme/question. Contestants have multiple spread options to wager tokens on which celebrity they believe is the correct choice. Once wagers are placed, there is a follow up video cameo where the celebrities verify/confirm the theme or question.	1,
Table Tennis	The host gives a question and contestants must give an answer each time they hit the ball. An example of this was when the question given was "It's late at night and you really need to go to the toilet, but someone else is in there. What do you do?" Answers given included "go to another toilet", "call for help", and "just go on the floor". Contestants rotate when they lose a point. In earlier iterations, contestants were allowed to choose their own topics.	1,2,3,4,
Wasabi Sushi	The game is formatted like a drinking game. Losing contestants have to eat sushi pieces filled with wasabi or other spicy condiments. In an older version of the game, contestants would simply eat a piece from a plate of sushi (Russian roulette style) then answer questions afterwards to earn points. Several pieces contained large amounts of wasabi; if a piece was eaten, their question would be worth extra points. In some iterations, contestants would play counting games to determine who eats the sushi. In season 5, they played a variation involving matching tiles similar to mahjong. In season 9, liquid wasabi is used.	1,2,4,5
Word Ladder	A variation of Word Ladder where contestants must connect words that were previously said by each contestant prior. For example, Red Book -> Book Store -> Store Front -> Front Door. Each contestant must memorize and repeat every phrase mentioned before finally connecting their own word to the end of the current chain. For season 8, a dance routine variation was played where contestants must watch, perform, and build upon a dance routine perfectly, or else get eliminated.	1,2,3,4,
Chinese Calligraphy	Contestants would write out Chinese phrases using a traditional ink brush which are then scored by the Gamemaster(s) or the audience. Also played during episodes around certain Chinese holidays.	1,
Pictionary	Contestant #1 is shown a drawing and the rest of the contestants (lined up in adjacent booths) have to quickly replicate or interpret what the previous person draws out. Contestants are then asked what the original drawing was supposed to be. Later variations saw contestants compete in teams of rotating drawers and guessers.	1,2
Guess The Song	Non-Cantonese or Mandarin speaking foreigners try to sing well-known Cantonese or Mandarin songs, and contestants have to run up to the microphone and guess the song's title.	1,2,3,4,
Bread Squeeze	Contestants would split into teams of two or more and attempt to catch piece(s) of bread that is shot out of a pop-up toaster. Early variations of the game had contestants using their face only but later versions had them randomly assigned a body part which resulted in combinations such as face to butt, knee to chest, et cetera.	2,3,4,
Balloon Pop	The original game had contestants tied down to a chair with a deflated balloon over their head. A question/topic was given and each contestant must give a related answer. Every second they spent unable to answer resulted in their balloon being filled. Once their balloon popped, they were eliminated. In later iterations, a deflated balloon attached to a pump is inserted between the contestant's shirt and a jersey shirt that they are given. They are then given a topic. The balloon starts to inflate and the contestant has to list ten things related to the topic before it pops.	2,
Rock, Paper, Scissors	Contestants would face off against each other in rock, paper, scissors but would have different alterations. For example, one variation has the loser grab a defensive object to block the winners' offensive object, e.g., the loser grabs and defends with an umbrella versus the winner having to grab and attack with a water bottle. Each round would go back and forth until the offensive player strikes the defensive player successfully.	2,4,
Food Spitting	Contestants would stuff their mouths with a Chinese baked good (鳳凰卷) that is known for being very crunchy, flakey, and messy. The contestants would then have to repeatedly answer a very specific question that causes their mouth to make a spitting motion- getting food all over their opponent. For example, "What is 1+1?", "Two, Two, Two, Two, Two."	2,
Sing The Song	Contestants are given a song to sing but they must use any other type of vocabulary instead of the original's to essentially sing the song to the same tune. For example, using French-sounding words to sing a Cantonese love song. The game eventually evolved into changing the lyrics of a song usually with comedic themes incorporated.	2,4
Wall Bounce	Outfitted with sticky velcro clothing, contestants would launch off a trampoline to stick to a velcro-lined wall. The game would evolve from competing jumping heights to making poses on the wall.	2,4
Counting Fish	Contestants gathered around a fish tank to count the number of fishes. The first to relay the correct answer to the Gamemaster via pen and paper wins.	2,
Gargle Gargle	Contestants would sip and hold water in their mouths and try to utter the given song's name upwards into a microphone. The guessing partner has to correctly guess the song name.	2,
Move The Rubberband	Contestants start with a rubber band around their faces and they must try to maneuver the rubber band down to their necks using facial and head movements only. The fastest time overall wins.	2,
Food Catapult	A catapult set on the floor containing food (for example, cake, seaweed, buns) is launched by the contestant using their foot by stomping down quickly at the other end. The flying food must be caught in their mouth. Sometimes, one person launches the catapult, and the teammates try to catch the food.	3,4,
Whose Is It?	Contestants compete in pairs, with one pair having to eat or drink food items that closely resemble each other (e.g., water and vinegar) and the other pair has to guess which contestant has the "safe item". Regardless of the choice they made, the guessing team has to completely finish the food item they chose.	3,
What Did You Say? (Wind)	Contestants compete in pairs, with one member on a treadmill yelling a sentence into a microphone and the other member listens from a distance in front of an loud industrial-sized fan (sometimes the fan faces the speaker instead). The listening team member has to repeat the sentence verbatim once the time is up. The team with the highest word accuracy in the shortest amount of time wins.	3,
Big Screen Drawing	Contestants compete in pairs, facing away from each other, with one member reading off items that rapidly appear on a screen and the other member has to draw out said items. Once the time is up, the Gamemaster verifies which items the drawer was able to sketch out. The team with the most items drawn wins.	3,
Sing A Song	In this song singing game variant, the Gamemaster gives a topic in which contestants must recite song lyrics that contain that topic. For example, "Song lyrics that contain numbers".	3,
Musical Chairs	Contestants play musical chairs, however, if they are unable to grab a seat they are given a second chance by answering a trivia question. If they answer correctly, they can eliminate any other contestant and take their place. If they answer incorrectly, they remain eliminated.	3,4,
Cooking Clams	Contestants race to cook a clam over an open fire and a fan to spread the flames. The first to have their clam fully open is declared the winner.	3,
What Is It?	An object is placed within a sphere that rotates extremely fast. Contestants have to guess what the object is. The sphere will occasionally slow down if contestants cannot figure it out.	3,
Family Portrait	Contestants team up with audience members for a family portrait. During the countdown timer, the team must run to a nearby table and grab food items and make it back in time before the camera's shutter goes off. The team that takes the best-looking portrait wins.	3,
All-out Minigame	Contestants face off one-on-one against each other in a series of minigames. Some minigames are variations of previously played games such as Calligraphy or food-eating contests. A popular minigame from this segment had contestants sing while receiving an acupressure massage on their foot.	3,
Audience Hide and Seek	Contestants split up into a 'hiding team' and a 'finding team'. Within a certain allotted time (usually dictated by the finding team having to recite a tongue twister multiple times), the hiding team are to blend in amongst the audience. They are able to also make use of disguises (wigs, jackets, hats, etc.) if needed. The finding team would then have to locate the other contestants whilst restricted inside a box with only a head space cut out and within the confines of the stage area.	3,
Choreography	Contestants are paired together and must replicate a short dance routine shown to them by a pair of professional dancers. Sometimes they are asked to replicate a non-dance routine such as a Kung-Fu performance or a mime act. In Season 9, two or three of the hosts (instead of professional dancers) would perform a dance, and the contestants would have to copy it.	3,4,
Improv / Acting	Contestants are asked to perform a scene from a Chinese Drama, act out a scene that is dictated to them on the fly, or improv a scene.	3,4,5,
Sit Up	Contestants have to perform sit ups while moving items in their vicinity into a bin behind them- all while avoiding food dropped on to them by the Gamemaster above.	4,
Balloon Rope Cut	Contestants split into teams and sit in a large container-like structure with water balloons suspended above them. The balloons are held by strings and each team take turns randomly cutting them until it triggers the balloon to pop and water is dumped on the opposition (or themselves).	4,
Stop The Button	Contestants are seated against a wall and given a button to trigger a timer. The goal is to press the button again at the 20 second mark to reveal a board above their head to block a large amount of food from splattering onto them. The Gamemaster hosts will often try to verbally distract the contestant throughout the 20 second timer.	4,
Price Is Right	Mostly played with audience members (with the celebrity guests sometime joining in), contestants compete in a format found similarly in American game show, The Price is Right.	4,
What Did You Say? (Foreigners)	Non-Chinese speaking foreigners are lined up in adjacent booths wearing noise-cancelling headphones. The Gamemaster recites a Chinese idiom to person #1 which is then repeated down the line. The contestants will then have to guess the Chinese idiom as they work their way back towards person #1- usually the most accurate-sound articulation.	4,
Kid's Thinking	Contestants watch a short video of a child interacting with one of the Gamemaster hosts on a television in which he will ask the child to do a specific action or task. The contestants will then have to decide if they think the child will do action A or action B.	4,
Chinese Whispers	Contestants are lined up in adjacent booths wearing noise-cancelling headphones. The Gamemaster then dictates a story/scenario to the first contestant without stopping or slowing down (the story is usually ridiculously long with a lot of details). The first player has to recite it to the next player, and that player recites it to the next, and so on. When it reaches the last player, he/she recites what they know.	4,5,
Ping Pong Ball	The Gamemaster floats a ping pong ball over an air-blasting machine. Contestants work in a team where they, using their lips only, collect as many ping pong balls as they can. A second version of the game had players face each other one-on-one where they try to suck the ping pong ball away from their opponent to score a point.	4,5,
Ragdolls	A ragdoll dummy is tossed into the air and onto a board; contestants then have to replicate the landing position of the ragdoll dummy.	4,
Ball Bounce	Contestants have to bounce a pair of balls down to the ground and back into each of their downward-facing hands. If they miss, they get pied in the face.	4,
Head-holding Ball	Contestants pair up and, using their heads only, carry a volleyball from one end of an obstacle course to the other where they then drop it into a basket on the ground.	4,
Table Cloth Pull	Contestants have to pull a table cloth off of a table leaving the table setting undisturbed. Items include food, wine, candles, cutlery. Contestants who leave the most items on the table wins.	4,
Lip Weightlifting	Contestants have to lift a miniature weight-lifting barbell using the top of their lips (cupid's bow). Weights are added onto the barbell until there is a winner decided.	5,
Tongue Measuring	Contestants have to stick their tongues out and downwards against a chart with measurements. The contestant with the longest tongue is declared the winner.	5,
Nose-blowing Ramp	Contestants, using the airflow from their noses, have to launch a ping-pong ball up a ramp and into a sandbox marked with measurements. The furthest distance wins.	5,
Milk Spitting	One player has to guess which of the other contestants (sometimes an audience member is asked to join as well) does not have milk in his/her mouth. The other players line up and can pretend to have milk in their mouth even if they don't. If the player that is guessing is wrong, and the other player does have milk, then that player can spit/spray it in the guesser's face.	5,
Elevator Trip	Themed around taking an elevator ride, contestants run a gauntlet of minigames. Other main games such as Food Catapult or Chinese Whispers are sometimes included.	5,
What's Playing?	Contestants split into teams, with one member on a piano attempting to play the tune of a given song(s) and the others have to guess what song is being played.	5,
Tray Drop	Contestants are blindfolded, seated, and handed a rope-attached pully with a large tray suspended above their heads. The aim is to let go of the rope to let the tray fall as close to them as possible before stopping it by re-grabbing the rope. The closest distance wins.	5,
Bread/seaweed kissing contest	In Bread, A slice of bread will be launched from a toaster and two people must work together to catch the piece of bread with their lips. A similar game is seen in season 8: one of member of the pair bounces a ball into the air, and both players, after each spinning once, have to catch it with their bodies. In Seaweed, a team lines up, and has to work together to get as many seaweed sheets as possible from one side to the other using only their lips.	
Licking contest	-	
Mini question & answer game shows	Before season 8, two players form a team (three-four teams total), sit in a seat, and have to answer ridiculous trivia questions. If the contestants get it wrong, the seat starts to move back. Umbrellas shoot out and the players try to catch them before they are sent back and get wet. Often, however, the umbrellas may have holes or lack a covering. As of season 8, the wrong answer will result in a machine hitting the contestants in the face with a cream pie. Additional pies may be thrown by the hosts (or sometimes other players) to anyone for any reason, such as getting it right, or giving a bad explanation as to why the answer was chosen. The game ends with an IQ question, for which players choose the answerer. If the player chosen gives a wrong answer, they are hit with a pie; if they answer correctly, everyone else will be hit. In season 9, all contestants have a giant balloon in front of them; if they answer a question incorrectly, the balloon will pop.	
Burping contest	-	
Piggy back riding	-	
Log rolling contest	A pair lies on a mat while hugging together and has to roll to the end of the mat. Sometimes, this game involves an even larger group of 4-6 people, or balloons on the mat that have to be popped while rolling.	
Brain Wall	Based on the popular Japanese game show concept of the same name, a Styrofoam wall consisting of cut-out human shapes moves rapidly towards the player, who has to fit through this opening, or else be pushed into a pool of water. A second round is often played with teams of 2-3 players.	
Human hula-hoops	One contestant must spin another contestant- who is holding on to them in a piggyback-style grip- around him or herself as many times as possible under a time limit without either contestant falling. Introduced in season 8.	8-
Pocky game	Two players face each other with a glass divider; a Pocky stick is sticking out in front of them from the divider and they race to see who can finish it the fastest without using their hands.	
Guess the number	The players wait in a line. Each player on their turn goes up and holds a square-shaped table with a balloon. They have to guess a number between 1-100 while avoiding a trigger number; the range narrows down with each guess. If the contestant guesses the trigger number, the balloon pops and they lose. The player has a chance to redeem themselves by playing a mini game such as rolling a huge dice and guessing the number that comes up when it lands. If they lose this game too, other players and hosts will spray the player with water guns or hit them with cream pies.	
Mimic sound	One player is given a sound that they have to mimic to the other players (for example: a frying egg; a hairdryer blowing; or the sound of a typewriter).	
Balloon Popping 1	Based on an idea originally devised from looners, or people that are sexually inclined towards latex balloons, who mainly use this toy to enhance their orgasm during masturbation (otherwise known as a balloon fetishist), one person holds their partner's legs while the partner uses their arms and hands to move through an obstacle course and pop balloons using their chest in the shortest time possible.	9.
Balloon Popping 2	Split into teams of at least three, two of the contestants sit in chairs a distance apart, with balloons clamped between their thighs, a third member of the team runs between the two seated contestants and attempts to pop the balloons by straddling the sitting contestants, often with a flying jump; this is accompanied by innuendoes from the hosts.	
-	One at a time, players must stretch their legs while walking along a large wedge shape on the floor as far as possible, then use a straw to attempt to blow candles out in a time limit.	
