= Savage Love =

Sex-advice column by Dan Savage

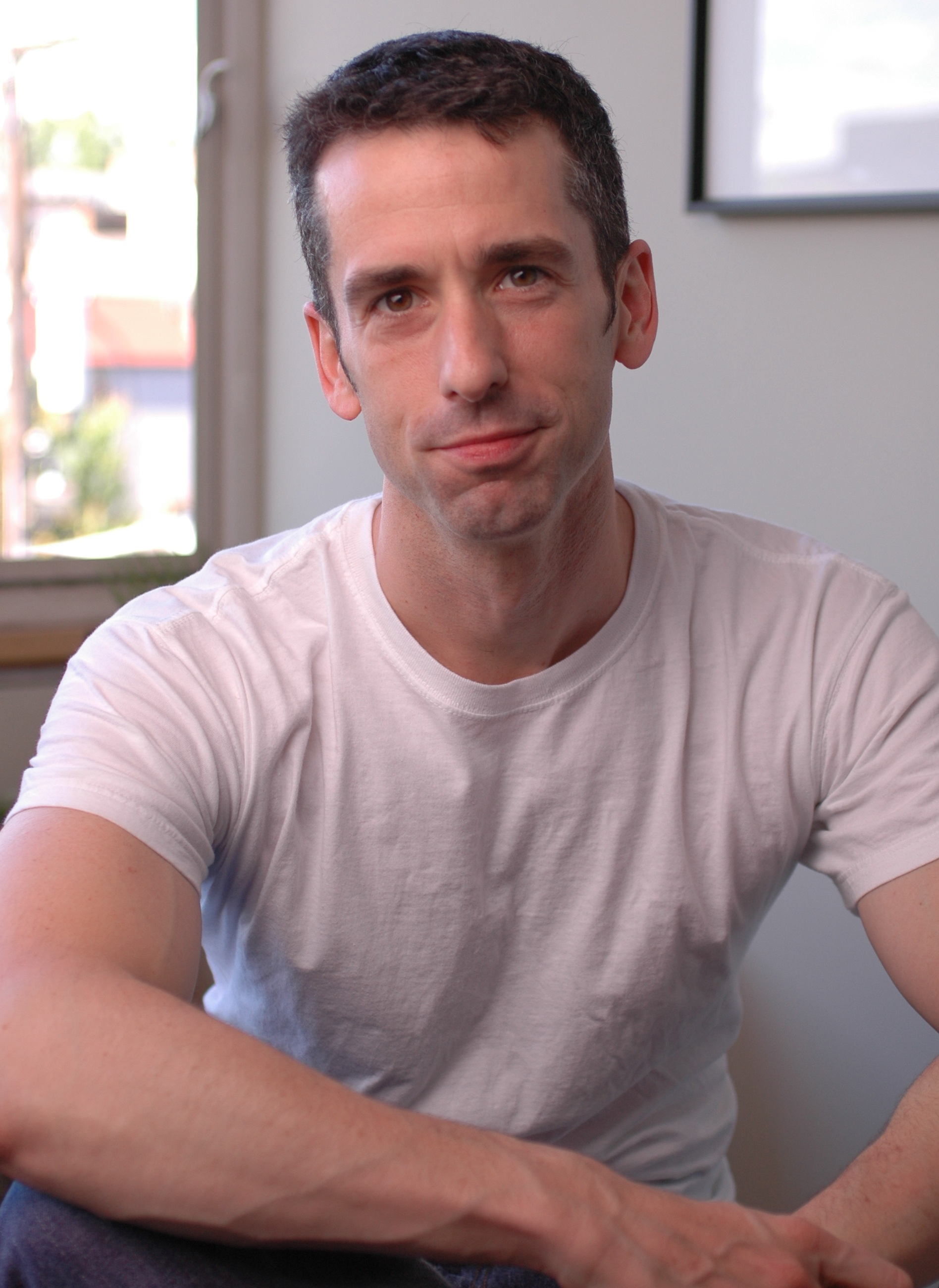
Dan Savage (2005)

Savage Love is a syndicated sex-advice column by Dan Savage. The column appears weekly in several dozen newspapers, mainly free newspapers in the US and Canada, but also newspapers in Europe and Asia. It started in 1991 with the first issue of the Seattle weekly newspaper The Stranger.

Since October 2006, Savage has also recorded the Savage Lovecast, a weekly podcast version of the column, featuring telephone advice sessions. Podcasts are released every Tuesday.

== History ==
In 1991, Savage was living in Madison, Wisconsin, and working as a manager at a local video store that specialized in independent film titles. There, he befriended Tim Keck, co-founder of The Onion, who announced that he was moving to Seattle to help start an alternative weekly newspaper titled The Stranger. Savage "made the offhand comment that forever altered [his] life: 'Make sure your paper has an advice column – everybody claims to hate 'em, but everybody seems to read 'em'." He typed up a sample column, and to his surprise Keck offered him the job.

Until 1999, the format of the conversation began with an advice seeker saying, "Hey faggot", then asking their question. Savage's intent was reappropriation of the word into a positive description for gay guys. Using this word worked when the readers were LGBT, but as the column grew popular, Savage changed to a generic greeting to better match the expectations of the general public.

Since 2002, he has written the column at Eppie Lederer's desk, which he, a "lifelong fan" of her Ann Landers column, bought at auction after the noted advice columnist died.

Savage stated in a February 2006 interview in The Onion's A.V. Club (which publishes his column) that he began the column with the express purpose of providing mocking advice to heterosexuals, since most straight advice columnists were "clueless" when responding to letters from gay people.

== Language ==
During the run of Savage Love, Savage has popularized several neologisms and initialisms. He has also debunked several sexual neologisms for sex acts, including the "donkey punch", the "Dirty Sanchez", the "pirate", and the "hot Karl", concluding "they're all fictions." He has objected to use of the term "pussy" as an insult, saying that vaginas were wonderful, "popping out babies", and proposed "scrotum" (pl. "scrota") as an insult.

Savage has also tried to reclaim many offensive words. For the first six years of the column, he had his readers address him with "Hey, faggot", as a comment on previous efforts to reclaim offensive words. He was criticized for this by some gay activists. After receiving criticism for use of the word "retarded"—considered by many to be an offensive slur against those with intellectual disabilities—Savage suggested "leotarded" as an alternative, because "leotard" rhymes with "retard".

=== Campsite rule ===
In any relationship, but particularly those with a large difference of age or experience between the partners, the older or more experienced partner has the responsibility to leave the younger or less experienced partner in at least as good a state (emotionally and physically) as before the relationship. The "campsite rule" includes things like leaving the younger or less experienced partner with no STDs, no unwanted pregnancies, and not overburdening them with emotional and sexual baggage.

==== Tea and sympathy rule ====
Shortly after a 2009 scandal in Portland, Oregon, involving openly gay mayor Sam Adams and Beau Breedlove, who had allegedly begun a sexual relationship with Adams almost immediately after turning 18, Savage created a companion rule to the "campsite rule", now known as the "tea and sympathy rule". The rule is a reference to a line in the play of the same name, in which a much older woman asks of a high-school-age boy, right before having sex with him: "Years from now, when you talk about this – and you will – be kind." Savage claimed in an article in The Portland Mercury that, while Adams followed the "campsite rule" – Breedlove did not claim that Adams had given him any diseases or caused him emotional trauma, and in fact still refers to Adams as a friend – Breedlove violated the "tea and sympathy" rule by making public statements that he knew could ruin Adams' career.

=== CPOS ===
"Cheating piece of shit", said of a cheater, but usually reserved for one who is chronic or abusive/passive-aggressive about it.

=== DTMFA and ITMFA ===
Savage often uses the expression "dump the mother-fucker already" (DTMFA), at the close of a response, recommending that the writer immediately end an abusive or worthless relationship.

A reader of Savage Love suggested the initialisation ITMFA, a take on DTMFA, meaning "Impeach the Motherfucker Already!" The initialisation was coined in reference to the presidency of George W. Bush in 2006, but was reintroduced in 2017 in reaction to the presidency of Donald Trump. Starting in 2018 Savage, through his website, sold clothing with ITMFA on it.

=== GGG ===
Savage coined "GGG", "good, giving, and game", and it means one should strive to be good in bed, giving "equal time and equal pleasure" to one's partner, and game "for anything – within reason". The term inspired the "How GGG Are You? Test" on dating site OkCupid, and the invention of a cocktail.

=== HTH ===
"How'd that happen?", a mock-incredulous reply to those who write in and say they had certain (often sexual) things "happen to" them, as if they had no part or say in the incident, when they clearly did.

=== Lifting luggage ===
Following the "rent boy" allegations regarding George Rekers, who has widely promoted aversion therapy, Dan Savage, along with others including Stephen Colbert, promoted the use of the idiom "to lift [some]one's luggage", meaning to supply sexual pleasure to, or derive it from, one's partner. This originated from Rekers who, when outed, insisted he had hired the escort only to assist him with lifting his luggage. Rekers also claimed he "spent a great deal of time sharing scientific information on the desirability of abandoning homosexual intercourse" and "shared the gospel of Jesus Christ with him in great detail".

Originally Savage suggested that "lifting my luggage" refer to listening to the speaker expound on the "desirability" of converting oneself from homosexual to heterosexual. Later, after several political humorists started employing "lifting your luggage" as an implicit or explicit reference to various sexual acts, Savage suggested that "whatever lifts your luggage" supplant "whatever floats your boat" in common parlance.

=== Monogamish ===
In a July 20, 2011 column, Savage coined the term "monogamish", applying it to his own relationship with his partner. The term describes couples who are "mostly" but not 100% monogamous; such couples have an understanding that allows for some amount of sexual activity outside the relationship. Savage believes that, of all the couples that people think are 100% monogamous, a lot of them are more "monogamish" than people realize. The term has since seen mainstream use.

=== Pegging ===
In 2001, Savage challenged readers of his column to coin a name for the sex act in which a woman uses a strap-on dildo to perform anal sex on her male partner. After multiple nominations and a reader vote, the verb "peg", popularized by the sex education movie Bend Over Boyfriend released in 1998, was chosen, with a 43% plurality over runners-up "bob" and "punt".

=== Saddlebacking ===
In 2009, after a controversy involving the Saddleback Church, the column defined "saddlebacking" as "the phenomenon of Christian teens engaging in unprotected anal sex in order to preserve their virginities". The term is a play on the word "barebacking", referring to sexual intercourse, especially anal sex between men, with no condom ("bare").

=== Santorum ===
Savage reacted strongly to statements made about homosexuality by former United States Senator Rick Santorum in an April 2003 interview with the Associated Press. Santorum included gay sex as a form of deviant sexual behavior, along with incest, polygamy, and bestiality, that he said threatens society and the family; he said that he believed consenting adults do not have a constitutional right to privacy with respect to sexual acts. Savage invited his readers to create a sex-related definition for "santorum" to "memorialize the Santorum scandal [...] by attaching his name to a sex act that would make his big, white teeth fall out of his big, empty head." The winning definition was "the frothy mixture of lube and fecal matter that is sometimes the byproduct of anal sex." Savage set up a website to spread the term, inviting bloggers and others to link to it, which caused it to rise to the top of a Google search for Santorum's name.

=== Tolyamory ===
A tolyamorous person is someone in a monogamous relationship who knows that their partner occasionally has sex with somebody else, and is willing to put up with it and turn a blind eye. The word is similar to polyamory, and is a portmanteau of the Latin words "tolerare" (to tolerate, to bear) and "amor" (love). Savage introduced this neologism on episode 900 of Savage Lovecast in January 2024.
