= Globophobia =

Globophobia may refer to:

- Fear or dislike of globalization
- Balloon phobia
