= Body inflation =

Sexual practice

Body inflation or inflation fetish is the practice of inflating or pretending to inflate a part of one's body, often for sexual gratification. It is commonly done by inserting items such as balloons, bouncy balls, or beach balls underneath clothes or a skin-tight suit and then inflating them.

Artwork depicting a female character whose body has been inflated

Some people online on small selling platforms have specially made inflatable suits, to make themselves bigger all over. Sometimes the body is actually inflated also, such as by enema or drinking large amounts of liquid. The entire concept of body inflation is heavily associated with the feeling of being bound to one spot, or usually due to a combination of a stomach fetish with many other fetish elements, as stated by research from scientists

Usually inflated people are inflated through the mouth or through their anal opening

== Examples ==
An illustration depicting blueberry inflation fetishism

Some inflation fantasies are inspired by non-sexual gags from popular culture. One such example is from the Roald Dahl novel Charlie and the Chocolate Factory and its film adaptations, wherein Violet Beauregarde is transfigured into an immobile blueberry-like entity after eating an experimental chewing gum. This scene inspired "blueberry porn", involving skin turning blue and bodies swelling with blueberry juice, with bodily fluids also turning blue and leaking out of erogenous zones.

Another example is Mr. Blowup, who appears in the Deviant Desires book. He wears air-inflated double-skinned latex suits and has made a number of TV appearances in the UK, including Eurotrash.

Other inflatable fetishists generate erotic stories, artwork, video, and audio files to indulge their fantasies. Sexual roleplay is also fairly common, either in person or via online conversation. The notion of the fantasy scenarios ending in popping or explosion is often a divisive topic in the community.

The first inflatable fetish community organized online in 1994, in the form of an e-mail list; as the popularity of online communication grew, so did the online community.

== Health risks ==
Medical case studies have documented patients' attempts to physically inflate the human body itself via injection of gases or liquids, resulting in injury in multiple cases. Instances of subcutaneous emphysema have been documented in patients engaging in autoerotic penis inflation. In another incident, a 42-year-old male's bladder ruptured after he injected pressurized water into his urethra and carbon dioxide under his skin, requiring surgery and hyperbaric oxygen therapy to repair the damage. Injecting air into the body can cause death, as in the case of a 38-year-old man who suffered a fatal air embolism after injecting air into his penis. In multiple cases, patients have suffered severe injury or death as a result of gastrointestinal perforations caused by injecting highly pressurized air into the anus.

== See also ==
- Balloon fetish
- Belly fetish
- Breast fetishism
- Fat fetishism
- Inflatable doll
- Pregnancy fetishism
- Vorarephilia
