= Savage Lovecast =

Podcast by Dan Savage

Savage Lovecast is a sex advice podcast hosted by Dan Savage and produced by Nancy Hartunian. The show began in 2006 as an extension of the Savage Love column in The Stranger.

== Background ==
The show is hosted by Dan Savage and produced by Nancy Hartunian. The podcast debuted in 2006 as an extension of the Savage Love column in The Stranger. The show uses a freemium model with advertising in free "micro" episodes and extra content behind a paywall. The free "micro" episodes are roughly 50 minutes long, while the paid "magnum" episodes are about 90 minutes in length.

== Format ==
In each episode, Savage answers voicemail messages from listeners seeking advice. For instance, in the October 13, 2015 episode, Savage answers a voicemail about jealousy of a partner's longterm relationship with someone of the opposite sex and discusses the Westermarck effect. Sometimes rather than answer a voicemail, Savage will have a guest on the show. The show opens with a short and upbeat theme song, which is followed by Savage delivering a monologue about the news or a personal experience. While earlier in the show's run, the monologue was often serious and political in tone, in more recent years the monologue has grown less serious and focuses on lighter subjects.

== Reception ==
According to The Guardian, the podcast had 200,000 weekly listeners in July 2014. According to Slate Magazine, the podcast had 300,000 monthly listeners in September 2021.

In Slate Magazine, Bryan Lowder chose episode 109 as one of the best podcast episodes ever. The Atlantic deemed the show one of the best podcasts of 2016. Time Magazine included the podcast on their list of the best podcasts of 2017. The Guardian considered the show one of the best podcasts of 2018.

Peter Wells wrote in The Sydney Morning Herald that "the Savage Lovecast is a podcasting institution" due to the show's longevity and reach. Lauren Passell wrote in LifeHacker that the podcast helped shape the sex and dating advice genre within the medium of podcasting.

== See also ==
- List of LGBTQ podcasts
