= Ashley Blue =

American pornographic film actress (born 1980/1981)

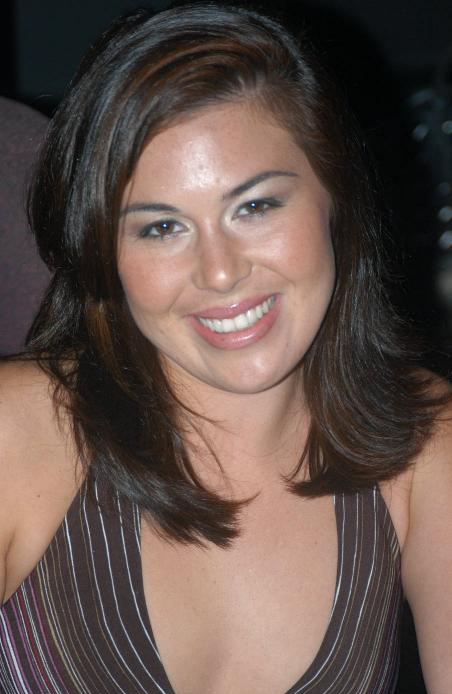
- Blue in 2005
- Born: Oriana Small; 1980 or 1981 (age 44–45)
- Other name: Oriana Small
- Occupation: Pornographic film actress

Oriana Small (born 1980 or 1981), known professionally as Ashley Blue, is an American pornographic film actress. She is a member of the AVN Hall of Fame, has hosted her own Vivid Radio show and written for Hustler magazine. In 2011, she published a memoir of her career in the adult entertainment industry, titled Girlvert: A Porno Memoir.

== Career ==
Blue has appeared in over 300 adult films and directed 17 adult film features. Her performances include the Girlvert series, in which she appeared while under contract with JM Productions. She ended her contract in 2007. Blue won the AVN Award for Female Performer of the Year in 2004 and the AVN Award for Best Supporting Actress in 2005.

She has co-hosted Playboy TV’s Night Calls Hotline, hosted her own Vivid Radio show, and written for Hustler magazine. She was featured in Inside the Porn Actors Studio: Ashley Blue (2006), an episode of Howard Stern's TV series Howard Stern on Demand. She also did voice acting for the cartoon Three Thug Mice. In 2011, Blue and other pornographic film actresses modeled for a series of paintings by Swedish artist Karl Backman. She was inducted into the AVN Hall of Fame in 2013 and the XRCO Hall of Fame in 2021.

Also in 2011, Blue published her memoir of nearly ten years working in the adult entertainment industry (using her JM Productions stage name "Girlvert"). Publishers Weekly called the book "fiercely honest," writing that Small "quickly became known for her gung-ho attitude and amazing endurance" and that despite pitfalls of the industry and "degradations too numerous to name", she "remains proud of her work, going so far as to call some of it 'performance art.'"

== Personal life ==
In 2003, Blue sued ex-boyfriend and fellow former adult film star Trent Tesoro on an episode of Judge Mathis. Blue was married to the photographer, Dave Naz.

== Publications ==
- Girlvert: A Porno Memoir. Los Angeles: A Barnacle Book. 2011. ISBN 978-0-9825056-3-2.
- Lee, Jiz (2015). Liabilities and My Mother. ThreeL Media. ISBN 978-0-9905571-6-6. (2015). In Lee, Jiz (ed.). Coming Out Like a Porn Star: Essays on Pornography, Protection, and Privacy. Berkeley, Calif.: ThreeL Media. pp. 260–269. ISBN 978-0-9905571-6-6.

== Awards ==
- 2003 XRCO Award for Cream Dream
- 2004 AVN Award for Female Performer of the Year
- 2004 AVN Award for Best All-Girl Sex Scene (Video) – The Violation of Jessica Darlin (with Jessica Darlin, Brandi Lyons, Lana Moore, Hollie Stevens, Crystal Ray, & Flick Shagwell)
- 2004 XRCO Award for Female Performer of the Year
- 2004 Adam Film World Guide Award for Best Actress (Video) – Girlvert 4
- 2005 AVN Award for Best Supporting Actress (Video) – Adore
- 2005 AVN Award for Best All-Girl Sex Scene (Video) – The Violation of Audrey Hollander (with Audrey Hollander, Gia Paloma, Tyla Wynn, Brodi, & Kelly Kline)
- 2005 XRCO Award for Best Girl/Girl Scene – The Violation of Audrey Hollander (with Audrey Hollander, Gia Paloma, Tyla Wynn, Brodi, & Kelly Kline)
- 2005 Adam Film World Guide Award for Female Performer of the Year
- 2007 AVN Award for Most Outrageous Sex Scene – Girlvert 11 (with Amber Wild & Steven French)
- 2013 AVN Hall of Fame
- 2021 XRCO Hall of Fame
