= Balloon fetish =

Sexual fascination with balloons

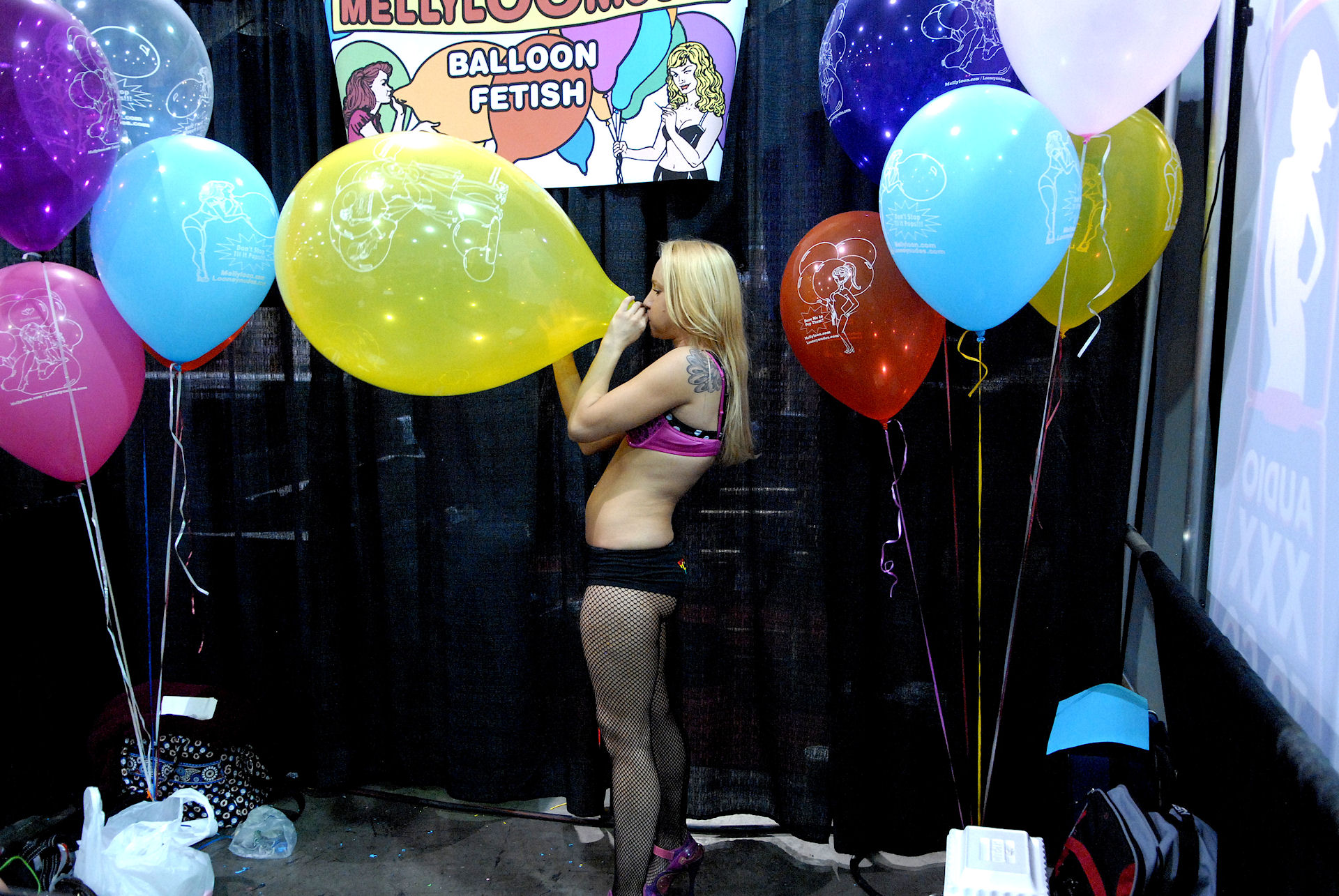
A woman inflating a balloon at an adult entertainment convention

Balloon fetish, also known as globophilia refers to a sexual interest in balloons. People with a balloon fetish are called looners. This fetish should not be confused with similar interests, such as body inflation (the imagined inflation of body parts), inflatable fetishism, or bubble gum fetishism.

While clinical research on this fetishism remains limited, communities of balloon fetishists have been documented across various online platforms, including social networks and dedicated forums. There is also a substantial amount of fetishistic and pornographic content, as well as other websites devoted to this interest.

Like other paraphilias, balloon fetishism is considered a non-pathological sexual preference, as long as it does not result in significant distress, interfere with daily life, or result in harm to oneself or others (otherwise, it would be considered a paraphilic disorder).

== Characteristics ==
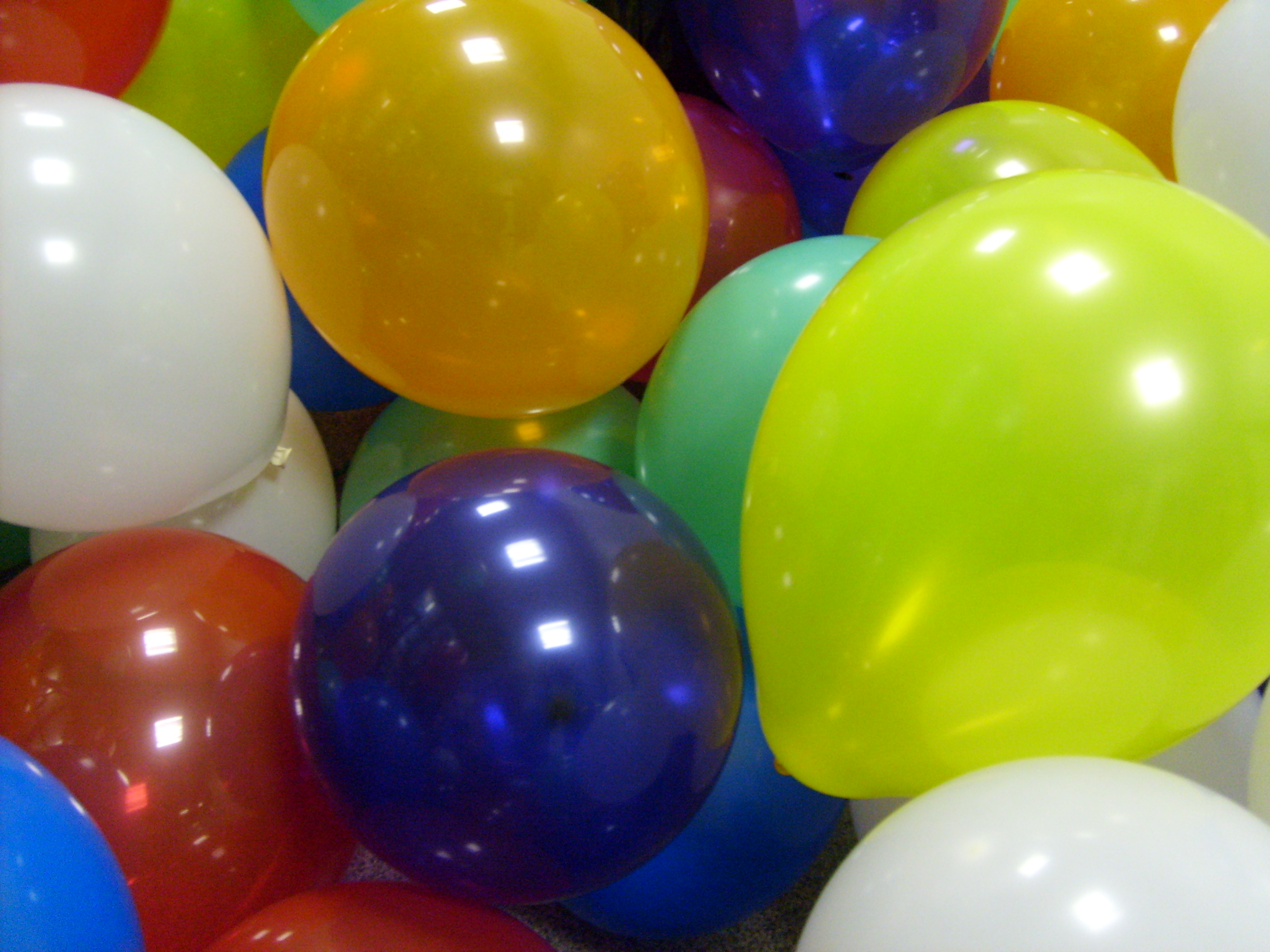
Balloons with different colors

Balloon fetishism occurs in both men and women, although like most paraphilias, it appears to be more common in men. However, reliable statistical data on its prevalence is limited.

Sexual arousal associated with this fetish can come from directly interacting with balloons or from watching a partner interact with them. In some cases, balloons are incorporated into erotic activities, such as masturbation or sexual intercourse, often through specific practices related to the fetish.

== Causes ==
As with other paraphilias, the exact cause of balloon fetish remains unclear. Many looners trace the origin of their fetish back to emotionally significant childhood or adolescent events involving balloons.

For some, the trigger may be a traumatic experience, such as a phobic reaction to a balloon popping. In other cases, the event might be linked to positive emotions, such as witnessing someone of the desired sexual gender interacting with or popping a balloon, or experiencing pleasure from interacting with or popping a balloon themselves.

In instances where the triggering event is traumatic, some individuals may develop a generalized phobia of balloons (globophobia) or their popping (phonophobia), which might later evolve into a fetish.

== Development ==
Regardless of whether the individual had a positive experience or trauma with balloons in the past, they often come to associate them (either consciously or unconsciously), with sexual arousal. The specific factor that triggers excitement in looners can vary, but for many, the predominant source of excitement is the tension and anxiety associated with the anticipation of the balloon bursting.

In addition to this core element, several other sensory and psychological factors are cited as source of arousal. For instance, the visual association of the balloon's increasing size with a corresponding buildup of sexual excitement, as well as the deep breathing when inflating a balloon by mouth (which may be related to breath control play). Other factors include the tactile feel of latex, the soft surface of balloons that may remind one of skin, their distinctive smell, the use of mouth during inflation (which may resemble fellatio), the sound of the balloon being inflated, and the squeaky noises produced when it's teased.

Emotionally, balloons may evoke a sense of nostalgia, bringing back memories of a carefree youth. In addition, the sense of power over a fragile object, especially one that could potentially pop, adds to the appeal. Some looners might also interpret the bursting of a balloon as a metaphor for orgasm or, conversely, as a metaphor for death, resembling Freudian concepts like libido (the sex drive) and destrudo (the drive toward destruction).

The exact combination and influence of these various factors can vary greatly from one individual to another. Most balloon fetishists prefer latex balloons that are larger than average.

In most cases, looners explore their interest privately, often choosing not to share it with others. Encounters with others who have the same interest are relatively rare, and some may fear that others might not understand or respect their preference, as balloons are generally not associated with eroticism in mainstream culture.

Due to the limited availability of information in the mainstream media, many individuals with a balloon fetish are unaware that other looners exist, often discovering this later in life through online communities. However, the first documented looner community was established in 1976, before the internet, as a pen-pal club.

== Categories ==
=== Non-popper ===
This group includes individuals who do not find enjoyment in the popping of balloons. Some may have a fear of popping, while others simply do not enjoy it, viewing it as the destruction of a "sex toy". Some non-poppers have also been noted to form close connections with their balloons, even anthropomorphizing them to a certain extent. Because of this, many non-poppers have been noted to react negatively to balloons being popped. Fetish content for poppers may sometimes include a “pop warning” because of these demographics. Non-poppers typically engage only in non-popping activities such as blowing up balloons, sitting or lying on them, deflating or playing with them.

=== Semi-popper ===
Individuals in this group typically avoid popping balloons, but may still find it thrilling under certain circumstances. For instance, they might experience excitement if a balloon pops unexpectedly or if their partner pops it intentionally to tease them.

=== Popper ===
People in this category have a strong preference for the popping of balloons, alongside other activities. Poppers may have a certain preference for how the balloon should be popped, whether that be via fingernails pressing down into the balloon, sitting on the balloon, using a sewing needle, by stomping on it with a foot or high heel, etc. Their fetish often develops from positive associations with popping, and some individuals who initially belonged to the other categories may transition to being poppers after overcoming a fear of balloons popping.

== In society ==
According to the fetish content website Clips4Sale, balloon fetishism was the most popular kink search from Utah, Switzerland and Estonia for 2024.

== Media depictions ==
- Looner, a 2007 documentary by filmmaker John Wilson.
- Break Up, a 1965 Italian black comedy film about a man obsessed with balloons.
- SexTV season 9 episode 23, 9 June 2007.
- Taboo, 2012 episode on National Geographic Channel.
- In 2019 the stylist Christopher Kane presented a collection inspired by looners. A tematic t-shirt and a sneaker were released.
- In Bob's Burgers season 3 episode 18 (It Snakes a Village), Linda's father tells Bob he has a balloon fetish.
- TLC aired an episode of My Strange Addiction that featured a man with a balloon fetish in season four episode seven, "In Love with Balloons / Face Mask Eater".
- In 2010, MTV UK aired a series of advertisements for its MTV Bang programming block; these commercials were explicitly inspired by the looner subculture and featured models flirtatiously bouncing on oversized balloons until they burst.

== See also ==
- Balloon phobia
- Body inflation
- Bubble dance
- Inflatable doll
- Coulrophilia
- Latex and PVC fetishism
