= Bubble dance =

Type of erotic dance

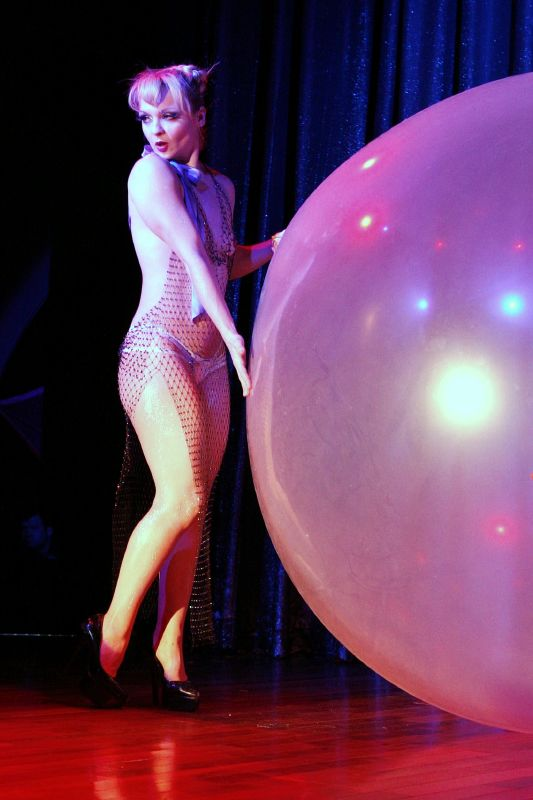
Julie Atlas Muz at the Miss Exotic World Pageant, 2006. Photo Michael Albov

The bubble dance is an erotic dance made famous by Sally Rand in the 1930s. The dancer, often being fully naked, dances with a huge bubble shaped like a balloon or ball placed between her body and the audience to make poses.

== In popular culture ==
In Tex Avery's cartoon Hollywood Steps Out (1941) which depicted various Hollywood celebrities, a rotoscoped Rand performs her famous bubble dance onstage to an appreciative crowd. A grinning Peter Lorre caricature in the front row comments, "I haven't seen such a beautiful bubble since I was a child." The routine continues until the bubble is suddenly popped by Harpo Marx with his slingshot, with a surprised Rand (her nudity covered by a well-placed wooden barrel) reacting with shock. Rand is referred to as "Sally Strand" here.

Sally Rand's bubble dance is featured in a short clip in the film Sunset Murder Case (1938).

== See also ==
- Balloon fetish
