= Coulrophilia =

Paraphilia towards clowns

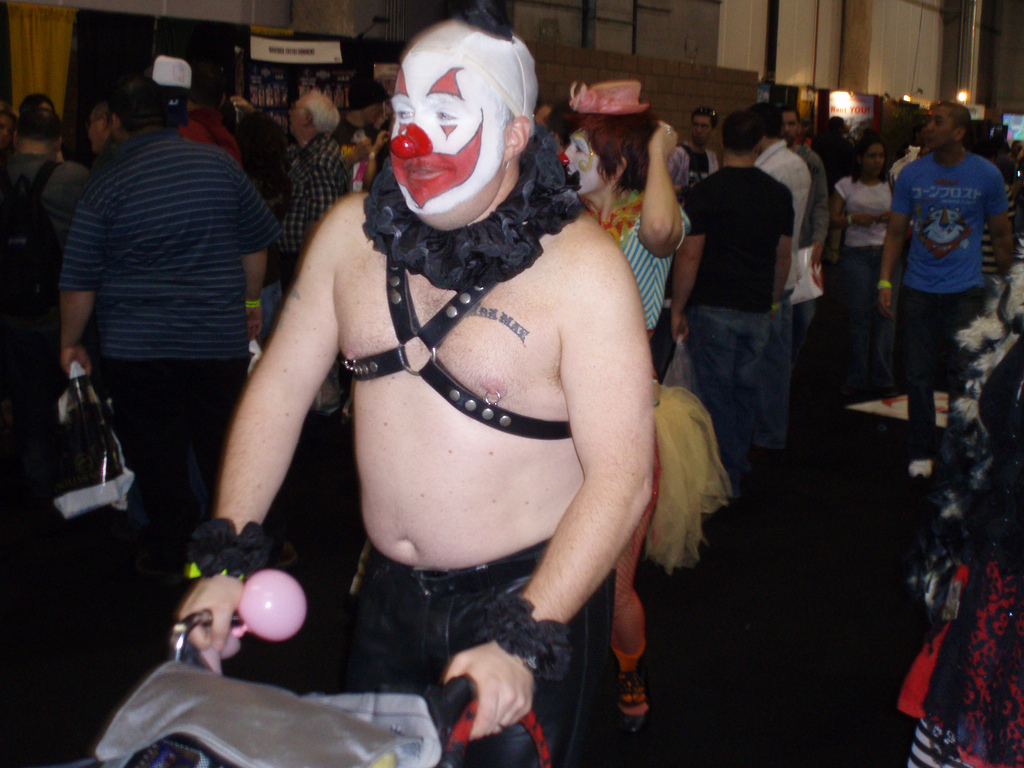
A clown in fetish fashion at AVN Adult Entertainment Expo in 2008

Coulrophilia is a paraphilia toward clowns. There is an associated subculture dedicated to it, and it may intersect with coulrophobia, the fear of clowns.

== Community ==
The coulrophilia community is related to the BDSM community, with both often using props and fetish fashion as a means for sexual arousal. Coulrophiliacs may consume pornography depicting people in clown costumes, or may use such costumes and clown personas in sex. Some self-described coulrophiliacs have cited the silliness and lack of seriousness displayed by clowns as a point of attraction, while others have stated that they enjoy erotic humiliation. Notable clown sex workers include Hollie Stevens, Miss Quin, and Sugar Weasel.

Members of the community may communicate online, using forums, websites, and subreddits. Since 2017, the term clussy (a portmanteau of the word clown with the -ussy suffix) has been used online by people attracted to clowns.

Coulrophilia may intersect with coulrophobia, with some members of the subculture being sexually aroused by their fear of clowns. Following the 2016 clown sightings, according to Pornhub, searches for clown pornography on its site increased by 213%, with women being 33% more likely to search for it than men. Similarly, the website XHamster reported that searches for clown pornography increased by 50 percent in the same time period. Around the same time, the film It was released, creating an online group of fans that were sexually attracted to the character Pennywise. Similarly, Geiru Toneido, a fictional homicidal clown from Phoenix Wright: Ace Attorney – Spirit of Justice, has developed notoriety online for her sex appeal.

== See also ==
- Balloon fetish
