= Rabbit punch =

Blow to the back of the head or base of the skull, considered illegal in combat sports

Rabbit Punch
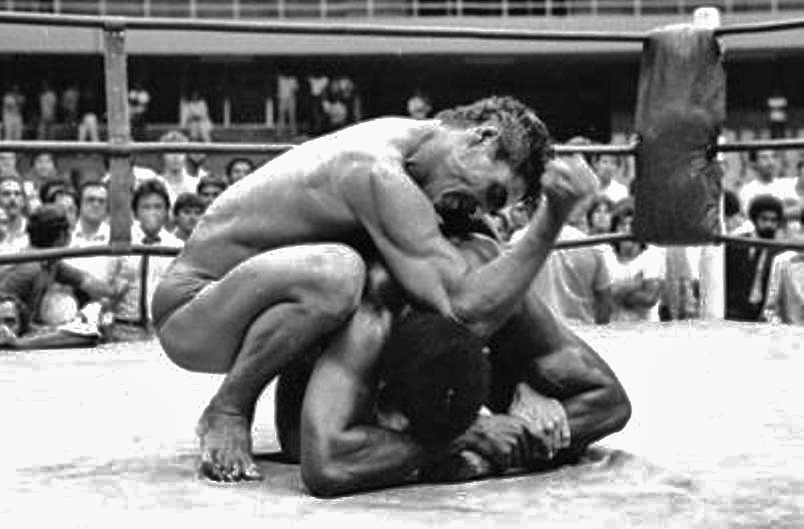
- A depiction of a rabbit punch, an illegal strike to the back of the head
- Martial art: Boxing, Mixed Martial Arts (MMA)

A rabbit punch is a blow delivered to the back of the head or to the base of the skull. Notorious for their potential to cause severe and irreversible injuries, including spinal cord injury or even instant death, rabbit punches are illegal across all major combat sports.

== Etymology ==
The term "rabbit punch" dates back to the early 20th century, which derives from a hunting technique where a quick, sharp strike to the back of a rabbit's head was used to ensure a swift kill without damaging the fur, considered a humane method for killing injured or trapped rabbits.

== Legality and risks ==
Rabbit punches are illegal across all major combat sports, including boxing, MMA, and other combat sports that involve striking due to the significant risk they pose to the spinal cord and brain stem. Such strikes can lead to catastrophic injuries, including paralysis, severe brain damage, or death, due to the vulnerability of the back of the head and neck area.

== Notable incidents ==
Several high-profile incidents have underscored the dangers of rabbit punches:

- On 17 October 2015, Prichard Colón, a well known boxer, was rabbit punched on the back of the head multiple times by his opponent, Terrel Williams, during a boxing match in the United States. During the match, Colón experienced dizziness as a result of the illegal punches. After the match ended, Colón began to tremble from his legs and started to vomit. He was rushed to the hospital where he was diagnosed with brain bleeding and underwent surgery. He was in a coma for 221 days (7 months, 1 week) until he was transferred to his mother's house. As a result of the injuries he sustained, Colón fell into a persistent vegetative state where he no longer could move or talk. Colón would later die on 13 August 2026.
- Francisco Leal died from severe brain and brain stem damage in 2013 after a match with Raul Hirales, where a rabbit punch was involved.
- On 29 June 2014, soccer referee John Bieniewicz was punched in the neck by Baseel Abdul Amir Saad, an upset player in an amateur match he was officiating in Livonia, Michigan, a suburb of Detroit. Bieniewicz died two days later of his injuries, and Saad was charged with second-degree murder. Bieniewicz's autopsy showed that the force of the impact on the left side of his neck just below the base of his skull had resulted in a rare injury with twisted and torn arteries around the base of his skull, knocking him out before he hit the ground. In 2015, Saad pleaded guilty to manslaughter and received a sentence of 8 to 15 years in prison.

== See also ==
- Donkey punch
- Liver punch
- Whiplash injury
