= Midwest Teen Sex Show =

Comedy podcast

- Opening title shot from the show
- Genre: Video podcast

Cast and voices
- Hosted by: Nikol Hasler

Publication
- Original release: June 6, 2007 – April 8, 2009

Midwest Teen Sex Show was a comedic, semi-educational video podcast featured monthly at their now defunct website with host Nikol Hasler, featuring comedian Britney Barber and produced and directed by Guy Clark.

== History ==
The podcast series was created by Guy Clark and Nikol Hasler. While Clark and Hasler attended Woodstock High School together, they had not been in contact for years until they reconnected at her birthday party in 2006. Clark asked her to host the show shortly afterwards. Barber didn't meet them until after responding to an ad on Craigslist.

Since the show's debut, it has been wildly popular. It has even had feature stories on The Morning Show with Mike and Juliet, CBS Evening News with Katie Couric, and Nightline.

== Overview ==
The show features tongue-in-cheek humor while providing basics on sex topics such as masturbation, homosexuality and dating older men. Working on a very low budget, episodes have been filmed at Hasler's former home in Waukesha, Wisconsin, Clark's mother's house in Woodstock, Illinois, as well as in Chicago.

The episodes are normally three to five minutes long. Hasler usually performs as the sarcastic host or interviewer, while Barber plays various comedic parts, often interacting with herself as the other character. Clark has also appeared in small parts in various episodes. In early 2008, two more regular performers were added, Neil Arsenty and Larissa Zageris, who also help write the show with the trio.

The theme song is by Gordon Tebo (who also went to high school with Clark and Hasler) and Britney Barber holds the Midwest Teen Sex Show sign in the farm field.

"Fetishes" is the first episode to be sponsored by KoldCast.tv. Late last year, they began adding additional videos to the site besides the podcast, including short webisodes and live shows.

== Episodes ==
The show does not have a regular release schedule.

Listed with release dates.

1. Female Masturbation - June 6, 2007
2. Abstinence - June 24, 2007
3. The Older Boyfriend - July 15, 2007
4. Birth Control - July 29, 2007
5. The First Time - August 30, 2007
6. Gym Class - September 8, 2007
7. Homosexuality, Part One - September 26, 2007
8. Beatin' It (Masturbation) - October 21, 2007
9. Syphilis - October 31, 2007
10. Dating - November 22, 2007
11. Backdoor Business (Anal Sex) - December 11, 2007
12. Parents - December 27, 2007
13. Porn - January 30, 2008
14. Oral Sex - March 10, 2008
15. Break-Ups - April 2, 2008
16. Sex, Drugs and Alcohol - May 14, 2008
17. The Penis - June 23, 2008
18. Fetishes - August 4, 2008
19. Orgasms - September 12, 2008
20. The Green Tongue of HPV - November 1, 2008
21. Boobies - December 1, 2008
22. Hook Ups - January 6, 2009
23. Vaginas - February 4, 2009
24. Condoms - March 4, 2009
25. Prom - April 8, 2009

"Fetishes" is the first episode to have a sponsor (Koldcast)

== Reception ==
In November 2007, more than 50,000 people were subscribing to the podcast through iTunes. By January 2008, that number was up to 60,000. By February, it was 70,000. Clark has stated the show averages 125,000 viewers an episode.

The show has had its share of controversy, particularly among sex-education teachers and therapists. While some praise it for tapping a hard-to-reach audience, others worry it's too racy for younger teens, and still others say the podcast focuses too much on humor and not enough on the facts kids need.

In "The Older Boyfriend" episode, when Hasler says, "If you're in junior high and you're dating someone who's out of high school, he's a pedophile. And pedophilia's a disease. Would you date someone with cancer? No." The sarcastic remark drew a large amount of angry responses on the program's website as well as emails. When the 'Morning Show' episode re-aired in January, complaints about the remark flared up again. More controversy came when they started selling a satirical T-shirt that stated "Homosexuality is a choice, like cancer." Reaction was so heated and split that the creators decided to discontinue the shirt after only a week.

The show's website had a disclaimer that "all advice given is simply opinion and should not be taken as fact."

== Television pilot ==
On May 14, 2009, Comedy Central released its 2009-10 programming slate, announcing "a TV version of the popular web series Midwest Teen Sex Show," in its pilot/presentation phase of development. Clark confirmed this news two days later on the website, stating, "We’ll be taking a break from producing new episodes of the podcast as we focus on creating the sexiest most Midwesternest pilot the world has ever seen." Hasler also stated that the cast and crew will generally be the same "though we will be looking for a few new faces." The show will be longer but the shooting and editing style will be "true to the web show, but with the longer format we’ll be able to add some exciting new elements." The pilot was filmed in August in Los Angeles. Hasler announced on Facebook that Comedy Central passed on the deal on November 25. At this time, no future plans for the show have been announced.
