= Donkey punch =

Sexual practice

Donkey punch is the sexual practice of inflicting blunt force trauma to the back of the head or lower back of the receiving partner, during anal or vaginal sex; as an attempt by the penetrating partner, to induce involuntary tightening of internal or external anal sphincter muscles or vaginal passage of the receiving partner. According to Jeffrey Bahr of the Medical College of Wisconsin, there is no reflex in humans that would cause such tensing in response to a blow on the head – and striking a partner on the back of the neck or head could cause severe, even lethal injury.

Jordan Tate, commenting in The Contemporary Dictionary of Sexual Euphemisms (2007) on the "almost purely theoretical nature" of the term, wrote,

The donkey punch originated in the late twentieth century sometime after the sexual revolution, when the empowerment of women was threatening the place of men in contemporary society. This shift in gender paradigms left men feeling threatened, and to reassert their authority, they created and popularized these theoretical and violent euphemisms. ... The secondary reward of the donkey punch is the creation, or reinforcement, of the ideal power structure, or solidifying existing gender roles.

== Act of Violence ==
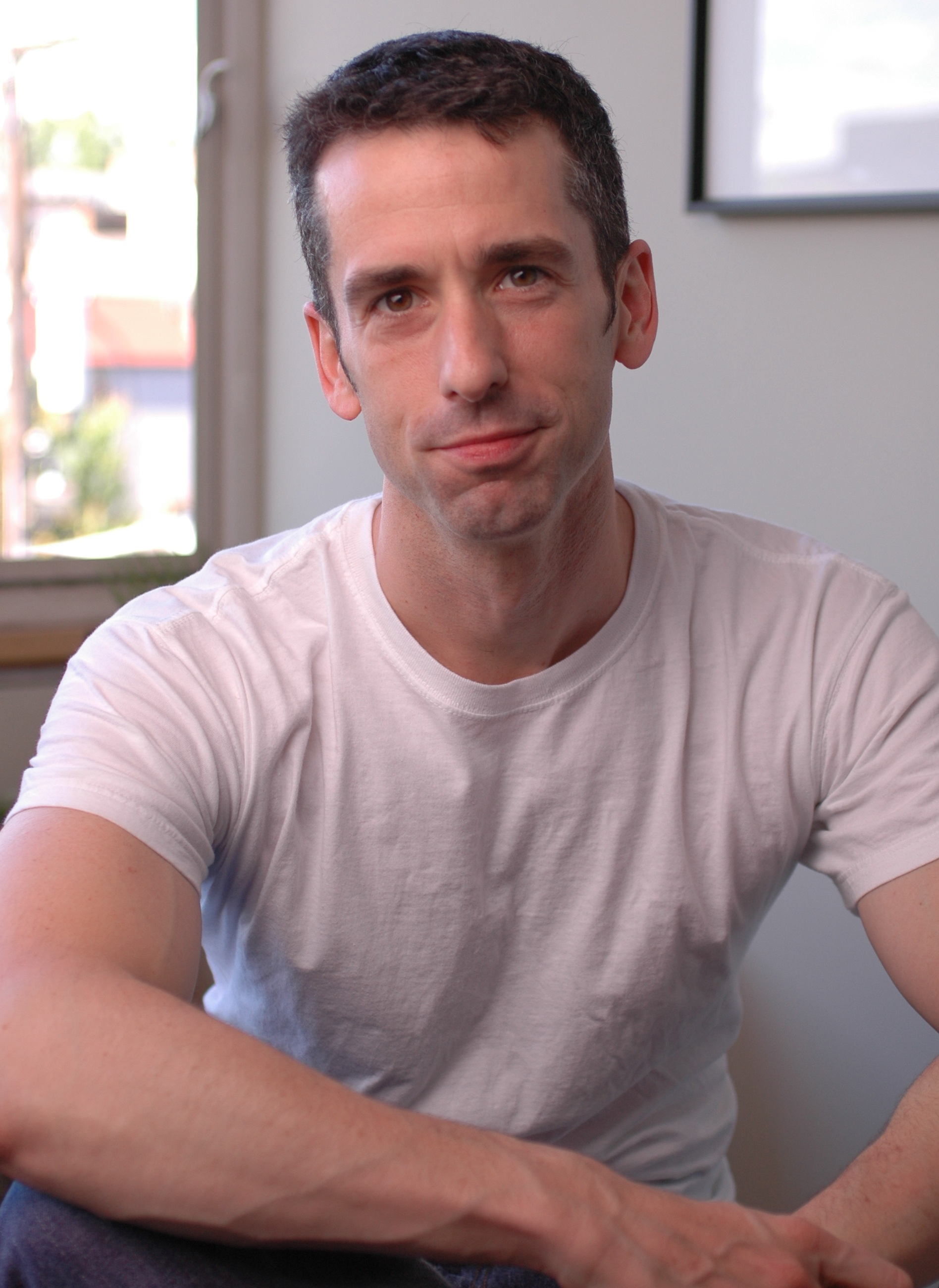
Dan Savage discussed the risks and false claims associated with the "donkey punch" in The Stranger.

Sex columnist Dan Savage has discussed the alleged practice on several occasions. In 2004, Savage referred to the donkey punch as "a sex act that exists only in the imaginations of adolescent boys," adding "no one has ever attempted 'the Pirate,' just as no one has ever performed a Hot Karl, delivered a Donkey Punch, or inserted an Icy Mike. They're all fictions." Responding to an enquiry from Wikipedia editors, he again discussed the donkey punch urban legend in his "Savage Love" column in 2006. He wrote, "attempting a Donkey Punch can lead to ... unpleasant outcomes," including "injury, death or incarceration"; he also pointed out that it "doesn't even work." He quoted Jeffrey Bahr, a faculty member at the Medical College of Wisconsin,

To the best of my knowledge, there is no definitive reflex in the human neurophysiology that induces involuntary tightening of the anal sphincter after receiving blunt force trauma to the occiput, or back of the head. ... Trauma to any part of the head can have serious ramifications. Pain, intracranial hemorrhage, memory loss, neck injury, and possibly some related sensory deficits in the arms and legs. A strong enough blow to the back of an unsuspecting person's head could result in a vertebral fracture, which, I hope most people know, could cause paralysis or even death.

== Pornography ==
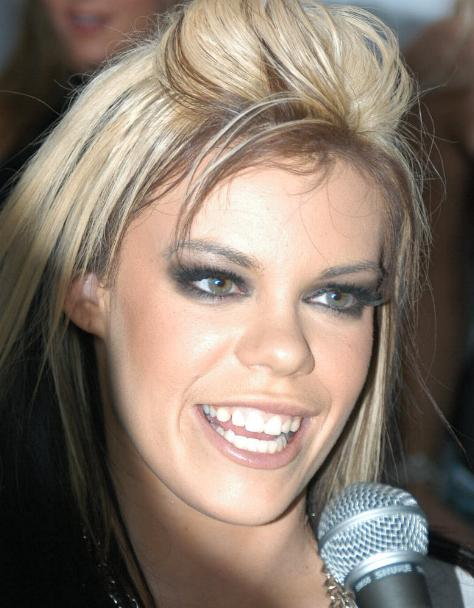
Gia Paloma is credited as the first victim of a donkey punch in a pornographic film.

The adult film star credited as the first known victim of a donkey punch is Gia Paloma, who had the act performed on her by Alex Sanders in the 2004 film Gutter Mouths 30.

Donkey Punch, a pornographic film premised around the act, was released by JM Productions in 2005. The film consists of four scenes in which the male actors engage in rough sex with their female co-stars, punching them repeatedly in the head and body throughout. In response to her experience on the set, performer Alex Devine allegedly stated "Donkey Punch was the most brutal, depressing, scary scene that I have ever done," and commented that "I actually stopped the scene while it was being filmed because I was in too much pain."

The viciousness of the film prompted Peter van Aarle of Cyberspace Adult Video Reviews to forgo covering any further releases from JM, while Zack Parsons of Something Awful (which awarded Donkey Punch a score of -49, where -50 is the worst score possible) wrote that the film was "one of the most morally repugnant pornographic movies I have seen" and "the sort of movie that the government would cite when trying to arrest pornographers and outlaw pornography."

== Enron scandal ==
"Donkey punch" was one of several slang terms used by Enron traders to refer to their price gouging methods. During investigations into the 2004 Enron scandal over manipulation of the electricity market in California, recordings of Enron traders were uncovered dating from 2000 and 2001. In the recordings, fraudulent accounting schemes were referred to using slang terms, including "Donkey Punch." The 2007 report by the Federal Energy Regulatory Commission was unable to identify the meaning that Enron had attached to the term "Donkey Punch." U.S. senator Maria Cantwell, in a 2004 press release about the Enron hearings, identified the Donkey Punch as "a crude pornographic term," one of many "lewd acts" that Enron employees used to describe their schemes. Cantwell asked the Federal Energy Regulatory Commission to take down the emails that were on its website due to the content.

== Jeopardy! ==
The term received extensive coverage online after it was given as an incorrect response on the January 16, 2012, broadcast of the American game show Jeopardy!. The prompt was "A blow to the back of the neck is the punch named for this animal"; the correct response was rabbit punch, a dangerous boxing move. The first contestant responded with "What is a donkey?" The subsequent contestant gave the correct response. A clip of the scene became a viral video.
