= Hollie Stevens =

American actress

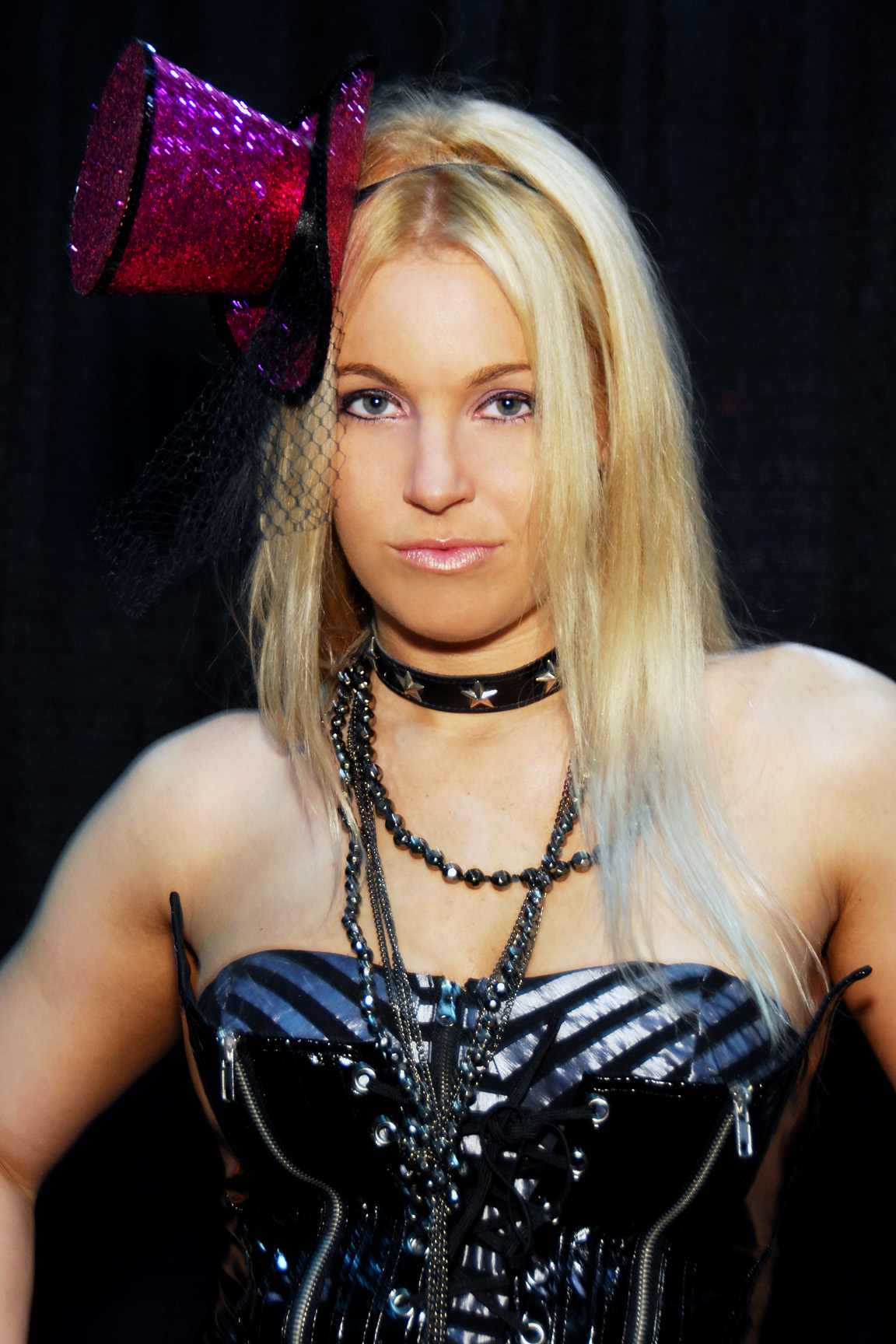
- Stevens in 2011
- Born: January 4, 1982; Kansas City, Missouri, U.S.
- Died: July 3, 2012 (aged 30); San Francisco, California, U.S.
- Occupations: Pornographic actress; wrestler; model; writer
- Height: 5 ft 9 in (1.75 m)
- Spouse: Eric Cash (m. 2012)

Hollie Stevens (January 4, 1982 – July 3, 2012) was an American pornographic actress, wrestler, model, and writer. She was considered a pioneer of the porn genre known as clown porn, which features actors in clown makeup.

She debuted in 2000 as a feature dancer under the name Holly Wood and entered the adult industry in 2003, appearing in over 180 titles. Her first scene was with Bridgette Kerkove and Joel Lawrence in Mirror Image for Sin City. She was a longtime writer and model for the magazine Girls & Corpses. She appeared in the independent horror film Noirland, directed by Ramzi Abed. Stevens also was a DJ, a live visual manipulator, a kickboxing athlete, a performance artist, and a painter.

In 2011, she was diagnosed with breast cancer, and in August 2011, underwent a mastectomy. In June 2012, she married her partner, comedian and actor Eric Cash; the same month it was revealed her cancer had metastasised to her brain. She died of cancer on July 3, 2012, in San Francisco.

== Awards ==
- 2004 AVN Award winner – Best All-Girl Sex Scene, Video - The Violation of Jessica Darlin
- 2004 AVN Award nominee – Best Group Sex Scene, Video - The Bachelor

== See also ==
- Coulrophilia
