= Donkey punch (cocktail) =

Cocktail with rum, fruit juices and ginger ale

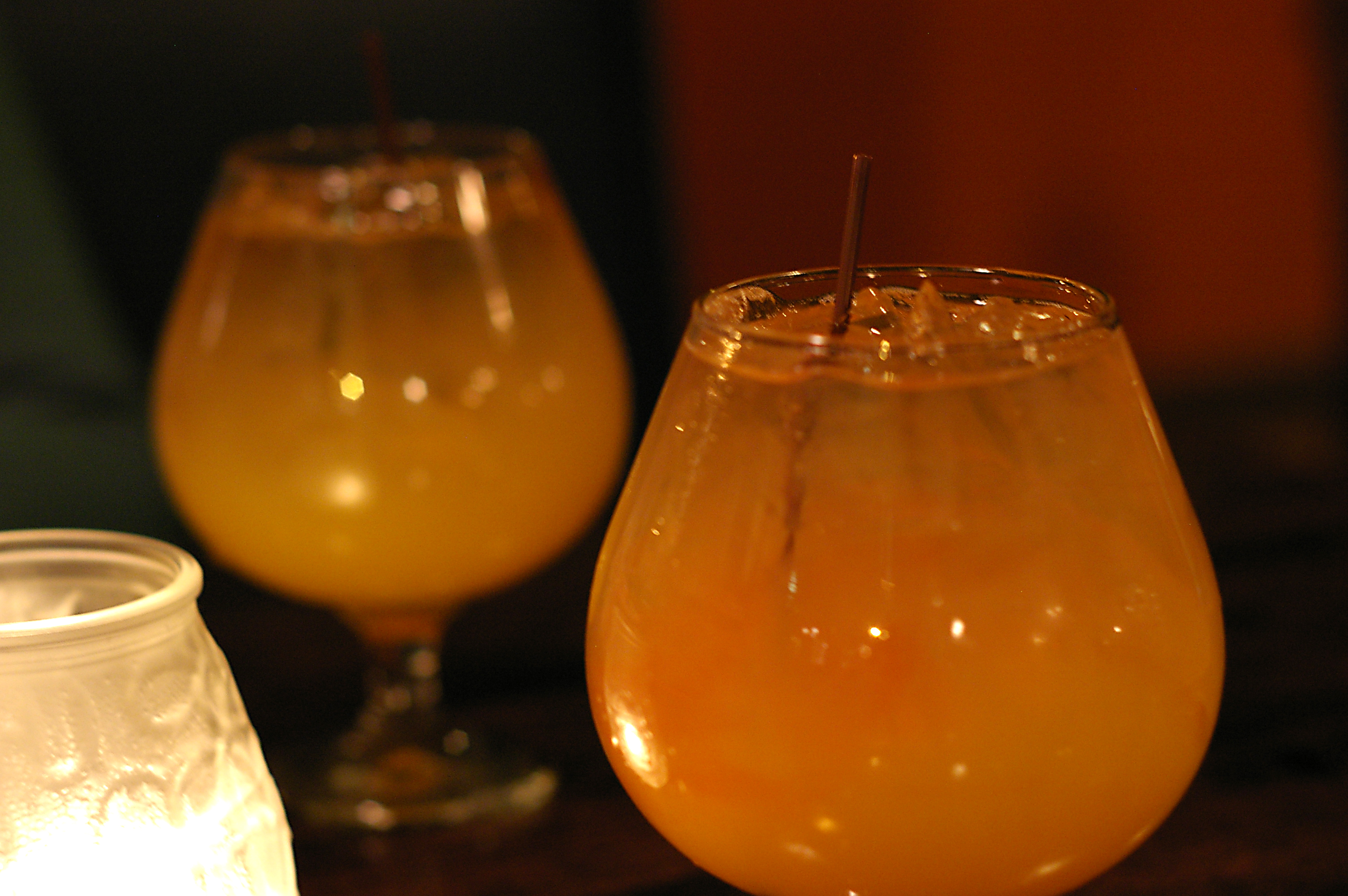
- A donkey punch (left) and a commie bastard (right)
- Type: Mixed drink
- Ingredients: 4.5 cl rum; 13.5 cl fresh orange juice; 9 cl fresh ginger ale; 4.5 cl fresh pineapple juice; 1 cl grenadine syrup
- Base spirit: Rum
- Standard drinkware: Highball glass
- Standard garnish: Orange slices
- Served: On the rocks: poured over ice
- Preparation: Pour all ingredients into shaker filled with ice. Shake well. Pour into large glass, filled with ice cubes. Garnish with orange slices.

Donkey punch is a punch or cocktail made of one part rum, three parts orange juice, two parts ginger ale, one part pineapple juice, and grenadine syrup. The ingredients are poured into shaker filled with ice and shaken well before being poured into a large glass filled with ice cubes. The ingredients can also be mixed together in a punch bowl and served with ice and orange slices floating on top.
