= Were You Raised By Wolves? =

Etiquette podcast

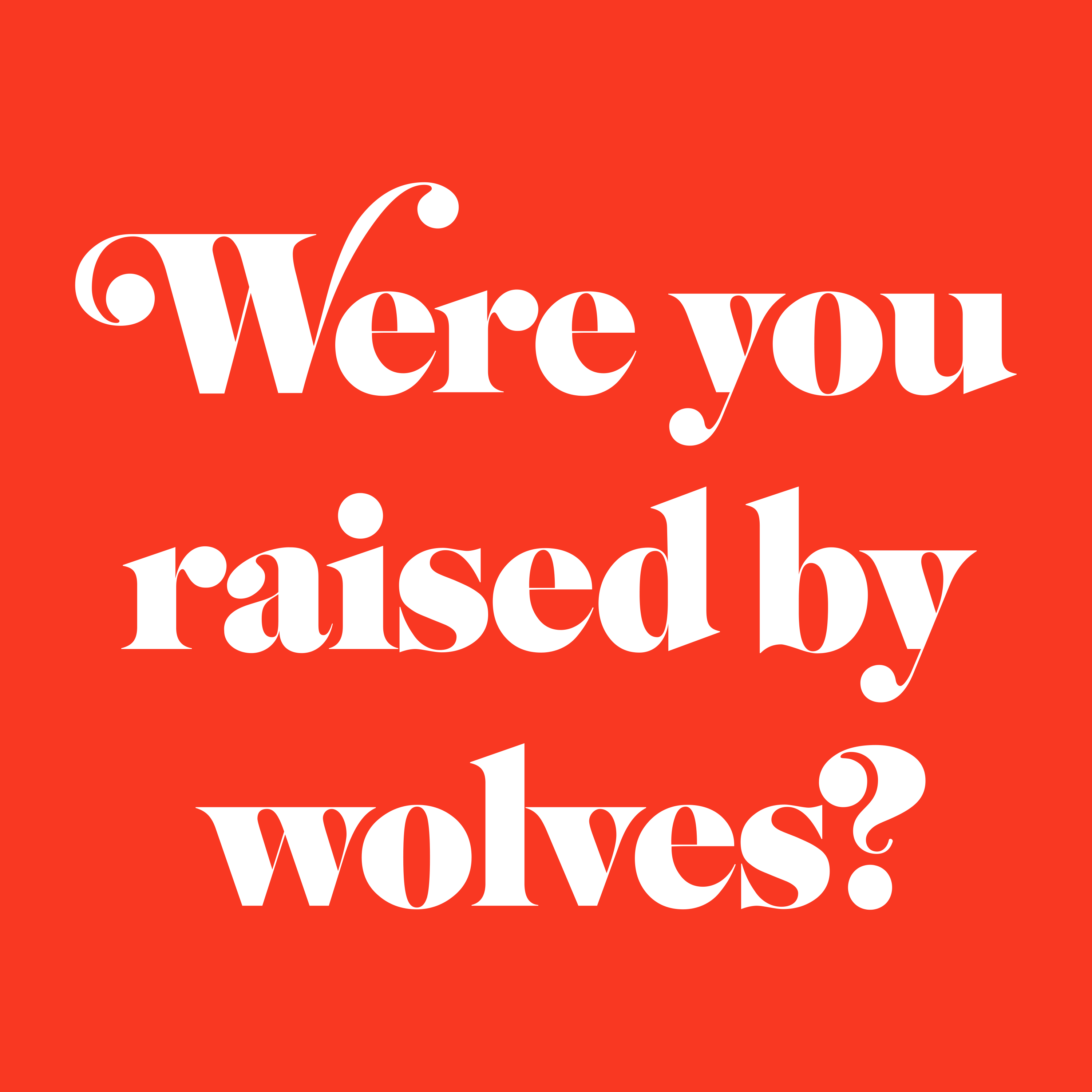
- Genre: Relationships
- Language: English

Cast and voices
- Hosted by: Nick Leighton and Leah Bonnema

Production
- Length: 25–40 minutes

Publication
- Original release: September 9, 2019
- Provider: Independent Show
- Updates: Weekly (Monday)

Reception
- Cited for: 2021 Webby Award Honoree, 2021 People's Choice Podcast Award Nominee, 2022 Webby Award Nominee

Were You Raised By Wolves? is an independent podcast about etiquette and manners hosted by Nick Leighton and Leah Bonnema, which debuted on September 9, 2019. The podcast features Leighton and Bonnema exploring various historical and contemporary etiquette topics and answering questions sent in by listeners.

== Content ==
The format of a typical episode involves six segments, each focusing on a different aspect of etiquette and manners: "Amuse-bouche" (a short explanation of a clear etiquette rule, such as "How to eat a croissant"), "A Question of Etiquette" (a longer discussion on a broader etiquette topic or theme, such as "Ghosting"), "Questions from the Wilderness" (listener-submitted questions), "Vent or Repent" (the hosts share personal anecdotes about etiquette in their own lives), "What Have We Learned?" (the hosts say one thing they've learned during the episode), and "Cordials of Kindness" (the hosts share something they're thankful for). With the exception of the first episode, the show does not include any guests or interviews.

== Reception ==
Nick Leighton has answered questions about etiquette on USA Today and The Washington Post. The podcast has been mentioned by The New York Times, The A.V. Club, and the New Zealand Herald.

== Awards ==
The show was a 2021 Webby Awards Honoree in the Arts & Culture category and a finalist for the 2021 Podcast Awards in the Society & Culture category. In 2022, the show is a Webby Awards Nominee in the "Podcasts - Best Co Hosts" and "Podcasts - Best Advice & How To" categories.

== Episodes ==
Episodes are released weekly, on Mondays. As of August 20, 2021, the podcast had aired 100 episodes.
