= Donkey Punch (2005 film) =

- Cover art of Donkey Punch
- Directed by: Grip Johnson
- Starring: Deja Dare; Rachel Luv; Alex Divine; Haley Scott
- Production company: Chatsworth Pictures
- Distributed by: JM Productions
- Release date: December 9, 2005 (United States)
- Running time: 118 minutes
- Country: United States
- Language: English

Donkey Punch is a 2005 American pornographic film directed by Grip Johnson and starring Deja Dare, Rachel Luv, Alex Divine, and Haley Scott.

== Synopsis ==
Donkey Punch is divided into four scenes that are each roughly thirty minutes in length and which consist of vaginal and anal intercourse, as well as acts such as irrumatio, cunnilingus, anilingus, and penetration with fingers and toes. Throughout each sequence, the male performers slap, punch, gag, kick, stomp, strangle, yell at, pull the hair of, and spit on their female co-stars. The segments conclude with the actor ejaculating into the actress's anus as he repeatedly strikes the back of the woman's head (the eponymous "donkey punches"). The exception to this is the third scene, which ends prematurely due to Alex Devine forcing Steven French (who she had repeatedly requested remove his ring, and to not punch "the wrong side" of her head) to stop. This leads to a short intermission (shot by French) in which directors Grip and Cram Johnson mock Devine, making statements like, "This fucking bitch, fucked up the most important part of the movie!" and "There's no wrong spot to hit a woman!" as they have Devine lick up French's semen.

== Scenes ==
- Deja Dare and Steven French
- Rachel Luv and Alex Sanders
- Alex Devine and Steven French. In response to her experience on the set, Alex Divine allegedly stated "Donkey Punch was the most brutal, depressing, scary scene that I have ever done." "I actually stopped the scene while it was being filmed because I was in too much pain."
- Haley Scott and Chris Mountain

== Reception ==
AVN's Steve Pone awarded Donkey Punch a 3½ out of 5, writing, "Rougher than most, but consenting cast is entertaining". A 4/5 was given by Rancho Carne, which stated, "If you want it rough, just come on over to JM/Chatsworth and get your fill. Slapping, choking, spitting, it's all here. ... After the punching, everything else is kind of plain". The viciousness of the film prompted Cyberspace Adult Video Reviews to forego covering any further releases from JM, while Zack Parsons of Something Awful (which awarded Donkey Punch a near-"perfect" score of -49) wrote that the film was "one of the most morally repugnant pornographic movies I have seen" and "is the sort of movie that the government would cite when trying to arrest pornographers and outlaw pornography".
