= Mürmur =

Comedy podcast

mürmur.
- Official cover art
- Genre: Comedy
- Language: English

Cast and voices
- Hosted by: Uluç Ülgen

Production
- Length: 75 minutes

Publication
- No. of episodes: 294
- Original release: December 23, 2014; 11 years ago

Related
- Website: www.murmurtalk.com

mürmur. is a New York City-based podcast hosted by Uluç Ülgen. The show revolves around impromptu conversations that take place between Ülgen and the various strangers who spontaneously show up to his apartment. In late 2016, the project began receiving international press, including articles in The New York Post, and The Paris Review.

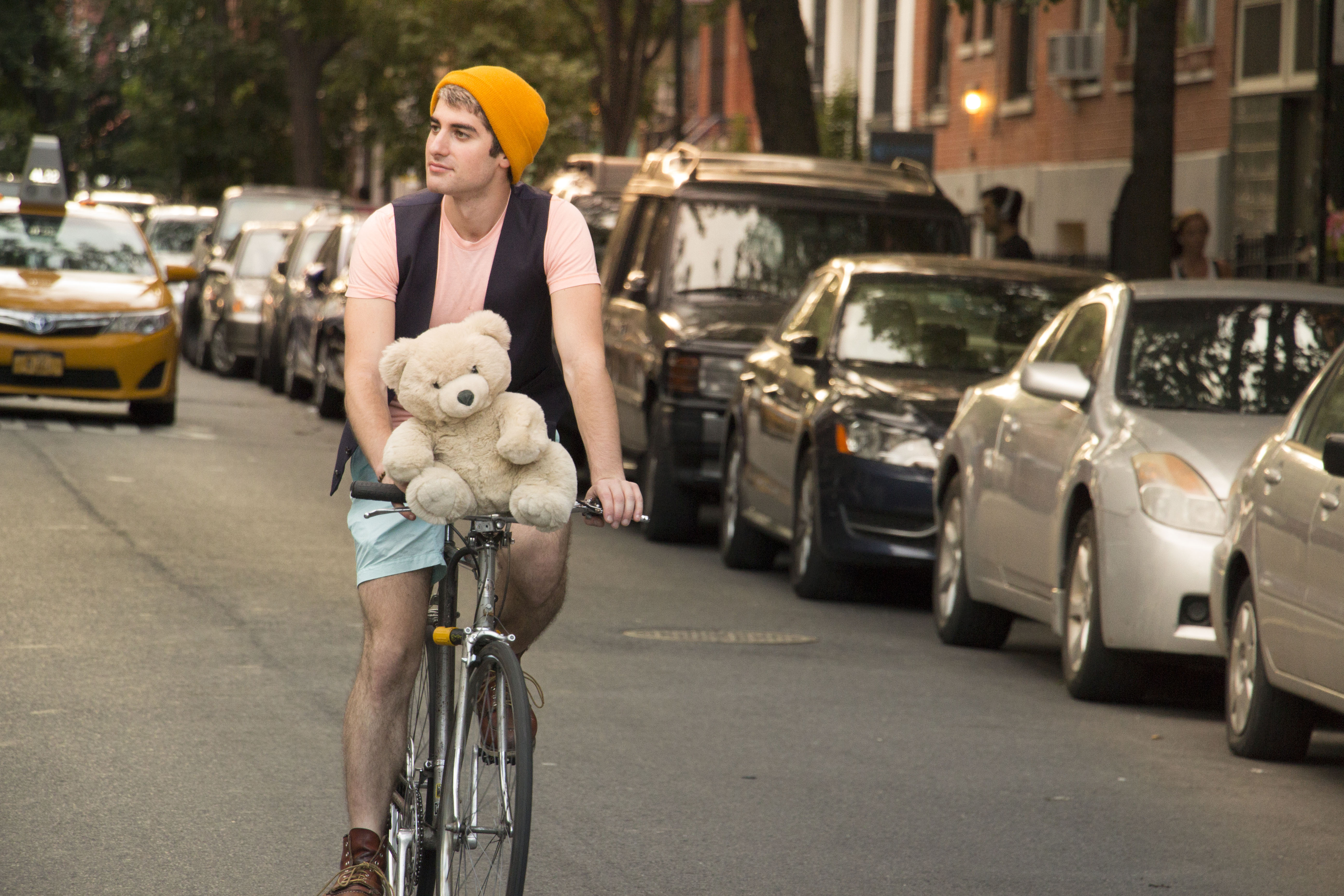
Uluç Ülgen and Yumosh in 2016

== Background ==
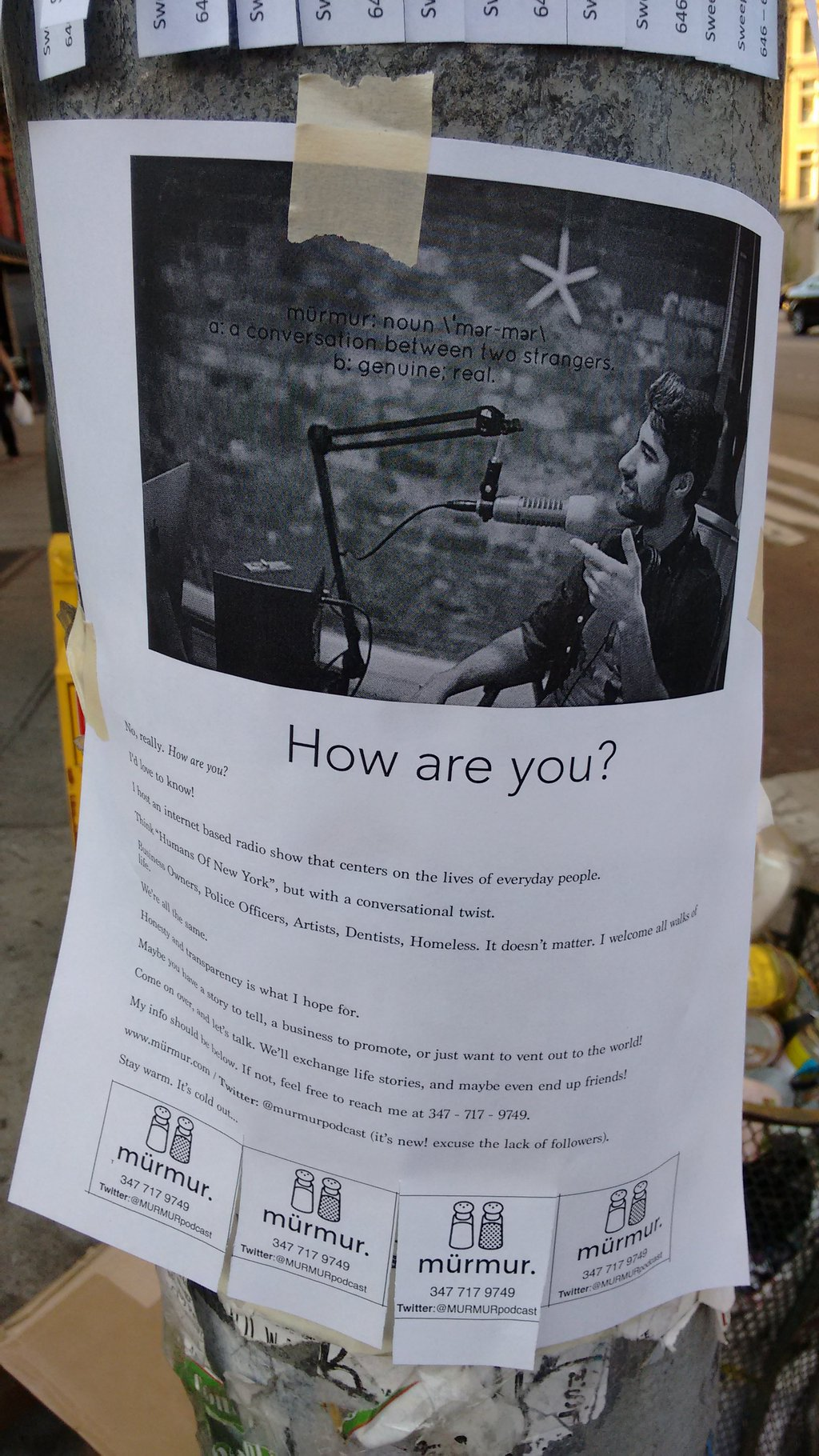
The Original mürmur. Flyer

mürmur. was launched in 2014 following a hitchhiking trip to the Middle East that Ülgen describes as rekindling his faith in humanity. After returning to New York City, he sold off his entire music gear in order to finance the space required for the project to help strangers through the medium of conversation.

Guests began discovering the podcast through the street flyers that Ülgen frequently posts in the Greenwich Village and East Village neighborhoods of Manhattan. Ülgen expresses that the abundance of strangers coming on the show, while overwhelming, has enabled him to dramatically improve his social skills. He now uses the experience harnessed on the podcast by giving advice to others who suffer from social anxiety and shyness.

In August 2017, the show's studio was forced to relocate after a liability dispute with the landlord of the building. As of October 2017, mürmur. operates from an undisclosed, private location in the East Village.

In November 2017, mürmur. was picked up for the Fall edition of Radio Free Brooklyn.

Ülgen often makes pleas in interviews to nab his idol Kid Rock for a mürmur at his apartment.

As of 2019, over 900 strangers have appeared on the podcast.
