= Pirate (sexual slang) =

Term use in sexual slang language

Pirate has multiple meanings in sexual slang. Several of them emerged in the 20th century and play off the tradition that pirates took whatever they wanted, including rape, which was "seen as a conquest."

== Usage ==
The most common usage is Australian slang for a man searching around for casual sex, as in "on the pirate" or the verb "to pirate".

It has also been used to describe a pimp who steals a prostitute from another pimp.

A more recent slang usage is a fictitious misogynistic act of violence called "the pirate" or "the angry pirate". Sex columnist Dan Savage fielded a question from a reader who asked about the act. The reader described it as "when you’re getting a blowjob from a girl, and when you cum, you ejaculate in her eye. Then you kick her in the shin. The result is the woman is squinting her eye and hopping up and down on one foot, holding her leg and screaming. Savage replied "no one has ever attempted "the Pirate," just as no one has ever performed a Hot Karl, delivered a donkey punch, or inserted an Icy Mike. They're all fictions."

== Compound words ==
The term is also used in compound words, including "tango pirate," popularized in the early 20th century to describe gigolos who sought out wealthy women at dances. The terms "butt pirate" or "ass pirate" or "poo pirate" have been used as sexual slurs for gay men. The term "Pamper pirate", in reference to the diaper brand Pampers, has been used to describe a child molester.
