= JM Productions =

American pornographic film studio

- Type: Private
- Industry: Pornography
- Founder: Jeff Steward
- Headquarters: Chatsworth, Los Angeles, California, US
- Area served: Worldwide
- Key people: Tony Malice (producer and publicist)
- Products: Pornographic films
- Owners: Jeff Steward and Mike Norton
- Website: www.jerkoffzone.com

JM "Jeff Mike" Productions is an independent hardcore pornographic film production and distribution company based in Chatsworth, California, US. The studio's content is controversial, with its films often featuring erotic humiliation and rough sex. JM has faced legal charges of obscenity in the US, and the studio has also won many adult industry awards.

== History ==
The company was founded by Jeff Steward. On May 21, 2001, the company's offices were raided by 20 officers from the LAPD. They confiscated several bukkake-themed videos. In response, Steward stated: "Some guy swims in feces on MTV, and that's OK? But for a girl to swallow eighty loads of cum is obscene? I don't think so." On the evening of the raid, Jim Powers was in North Hollywood shooting another bukkake film. In reference to what he considered the injustice of the raid, he announced to the men involved: "We're doing this for all of America".

On May 31, 2006, the company, Jeff Steward, Mike Norton, and distributor Five Star Video were indicted for distribution of obscenity by the Department of Justice. The defendants faced a maximum sentence of five years for each of the obscenity counts. Jeff Steward was defended by lawyer Al Gelbard, who also represented Evil Angel in its obscenity trial. In his opening arguments at the trial, the prosecutor cited "the sacred place of mothers in society", in reference to the treatment of the film's actresses. On October 16, 2007, all obscenity charges against JM and Jeff Steward were dropped due to lack of evidence that JM had sold the films to Five Star. Cast interviews demonstrating that actresses appearing in roles that simulated abuse or degradation did so willingly played a role in the acquittal. A Phoenix jury later found Five Star guilty of interstate transportation of obscene materials, due to it having posted Gag Factor 18 to an FBI agent in Virginia.

A bukkake shoot for JM Productions in Van Nuys was robbed at gunpoint on October 1, 2008 when an armed assailant, described as a mixed race man wearing a Los Angeles Dodgers jacket and a bulletproof vest, stole approximately $3,750 in cash – $75 to be paid to each performer – from production manager Johnny Thrust. Jim Powers offered a $1,000 reward for any information leading to the arrest of the suspect in the robbery, which the LAPD believe was an inside job.

JM is the distributor for Brandon Iron Productions, Khan Tusion's Pariah Pictures, Grip & Cram Johnson's Chatsworth Pictures, and FuckYouCash.com. In 2005, it signed a deal to make JM content available on HotMovies.com's pay-per-minute video-on-demand site. Its films are also available on Pornhub, Fyre TV and on AdultRental.com's pay-per-view service.

== Actresses ==
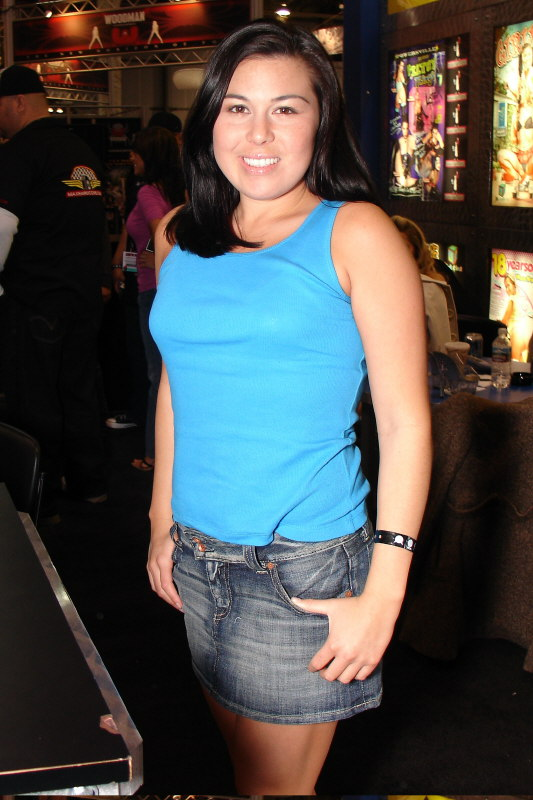
Former contract star Ashley Blue

In March 2004, Ashley Blue signed a three-year contract with JM, and she appeared in the Girlvert series. In 2005, the company bought her a Jaguar car after she extended her contract by a year. On February 14, 2007, she ended her contract, entering immediately into a one-year commitment with LA Direct Models. Hillary Scott appeared in American Bukkake 29, Swirlies 2, Irritable Bowel Syndrome 2, and Hillary Scott Cock Star. The 2004 production Guttermouths 30 featured the first pornographic scene enacting the urban legend of the donkey punch, showing Gia Paloma being punched on the back of her head by Alex Sanders.

== Criticism ==
Gag Factor 10 is discussed in a piece by Robert Jensen of the School of Journalism at the University of Texas. He includes it as an example of pornography which he alleges is dangerous and denigrates women, as the actresses appear to be in pain in the film.

The Tough Love series was criticized in an article in The Age as an example of pornography that contains sexual violence and "images that are gratuitous or offensive towards women". The Tough Love films feature, among other things, naked women having their heads flushed down a toilet bowl. Some of the film covers feature the slogan: "Love should leave marks."

In 2005, JM released Donkey Punch, which features actresses receiving a donkey punch. Actress Alex Divine reportedly posted on ExtremeGirlForum.com that "Donkey Punch was the most brutal, depressing, scary scene that I have ever done." Although she initially agreed to be hit on the head during the scene, she claimed to have misunderstood exactly how physical the scene would be.

JM producer Tony Malice has said it does not produce extreme content for extremity's sake, they produce it because there is a demand for this sort of content. Malice says consumer demand for extreme content has been driven by an excess of vanilla sex content, produced by more mainstream studios.

== Awards ==
The following is a selection of some of the major awards JM films have won:

- 1999 AVN Award - Best Continuing Video Series (White Trash Whore)
- 2000 AVN Award - Best All-Girl Series (The Violation Of...)
- 2000 AVN Award - Most Outrageous Sex Scene (Mila) with Herschel Savage & Dave Hardman in "Perverted Stories 22"
- 2000 AVN Award - Best Vignette Series (Perverted Stories)
- 2001 AVN Award - Best Vignette Series (Perverted Stories)
- 2001 AVN Award - Best All-Girl Series (The Violation Of...)
- 2002 AVN Award - Best All-Girl Series (The Violation Of...)
- 2002 AVN Award - Most Outrageous Sex Scene (Perverted Stories 31) with Kristen Kane, Herschel Savage & Rafe
- 2003 AVN Award - Best All-Girl Series (The Violation Of...)
- 2003 AVN Award - Best Oral-Themed Series (Gag Factor)
- 2004 AVN Award - Best Oral-Themed Series (Gag Factor)
- 2004 AVN Award - Best Continuing Video Series (Girlvert)
- 2004 AVN Award - Most Outrageous Sex Scene (Perverted Stories, The Movie) with Julie Night, Maggie Star & Mr. Pete
- 2005 AVN Award - Best All-Girl Series (The Violation Of...)
- 2005 AVN Award - Best Oral-Themed Feature (Francesca Le's Cum Swallowing Whores 3)
- 2005 AVN Award - Best Specialty Release - Big Bust (Francesca's Juggies)
- 2005 AVN Award - Best Continuing Video Series (Girlvert)
- 2006 AVN Award - Best Continuing Video Series (Girlvert)
- 2007 AVN Award - Most Outrageous Sex Scene (Girlvert 11) with Ashley Blue, Amber Wild & Steve French
- 2008 AVN Award - Most Outrageous Sex Scene (Ass Blasting Felching Anal Whores) with Cindy Crawford, Rick Masters & Audrey Hollander
- 2008 AVN Reuben Sturman Award - Jeff Steward of JM Productions
