= Nikol Hasler =

American screenwriter

- Nicole Songer
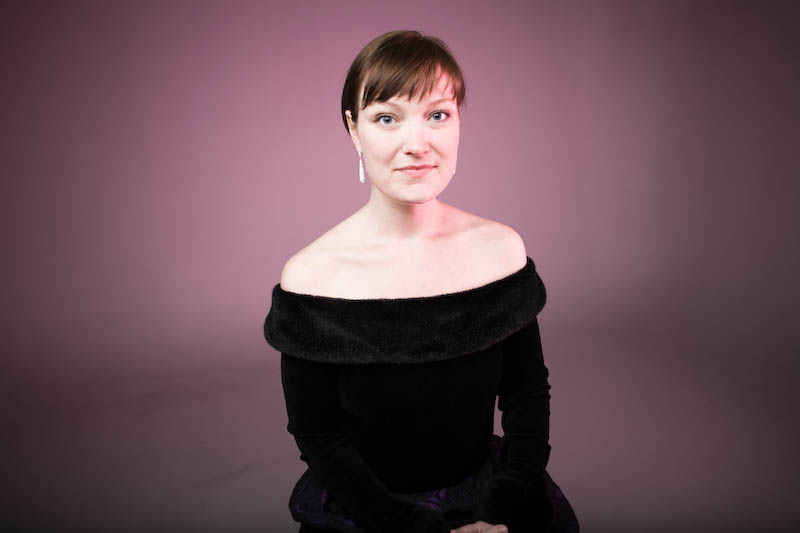
- Born: Nichole Dean Roach; March 15, 1979 (age 47); Wisconsin, U.S.A.
- Occupations: Writer, Producer, Director, Project Manager
- Employer: Public Media Group of Southern California
- Spouse(s): Mitchell Knapmiller, Ned (Edward) Hasler
- Children: Trast, Ayden, Blue, Pelham

Nikol Hasler (born 15 March 1979) is an American internet content creator, producer, writer, and filmmaker known best for her work on Midwest Teen Sex Show, and her frank, direct, dark humor.

== Biography ==
Nikol Hasler is a Wisconsin native who spent years in the foster care system.

Hasler gained attention in 2008 as the host of the video podcast Midwest Teen Sex Show, an informative comedy show known for frank discussions about teenage sexuality. The show's success prompted her to move to Los Angeles in June 2009 with her three children. During that summer, she produced and wrote a television pilot for Comedy Central based on the web series, and worked on a book about sex for teens. Comedy Central did not pick up the show as a series, but her book, Sex: A Book For Teens was released in June, 2010. Hasler remained in Los Angeles after the pilot was shot, stating on Crushable that "Even the d-bags out here who are stereotypical LA don’t bother me because they give me something to laugh at. The sunshine. The food. The hot people. Yeah. This place is cool."

== Works ==
On May 14, 2009, it was officially announced that Nikol's show The Midwest Teen Sex Show, a video podcast about teen sexuality, would be turned into a series for Comedy Central. However, in September 2009 Hasler announced that Comedy Central had not picked up the show for series. Beyond the Midwest Teen Sex Show, Hasler has contributed to projects for a number of publishing outlets, and in various media.

Real American Family, a show on PiC.tv, addresses issues important to many families—being a single parent, choosing healthy diet, preparing for the school year, etc. -- with Nikol's typical frankness and sense of humor. She and her team also created an online safety video for teens called Don't Be An Idiot Online; it was released by E-Spin.

In February 2010, she started an ongoing sex column for the newly launched Crushable called "Sex, Honestly". She wrote an advice column for Milwaukee Magazine called "Love, Sex, Etc.".

In May 2010, copies of Hasler's book, Sex: A Book For Teens, was published by Zest Publications in San Francisco. The book features back cover endorsements from former surgeon general Dr. Jocelyn Elders and feminist author Betty Dodson. In 2016 an updated version was released. In 2018 Zest was acquired by Learner Publishing. The book is often included in school library book bans.

In July 2009, Hasler accepted a position of a producer for the non-profit One Economy Corporation (of which PiC.tv is a subsidiary), immediately beginning production on a series about teen pregnancy, then revamping Real American Family with an entirely new cast and crew.

In March 2013, Hasler began working for PBS in Los Angeles.

== Press ==
- About's sexuality page
- Ypulse
- Search Engine World interview with Hasler, August 2008
- ABC News Interview with Hasler, January 2008
- Interview about MTSS
- NewTeeVee interview with Hasler
- Interview about Real American Family
- Interview with Violet Blue
- Hasler on CBS Early Show
- Hasler interview with Gawker
