= Donkey Punch (novel) =

Book by Ray Banks

- 2007 book cover
- Author: Ray Banks
- Original title: Donkey Punch
- Language: English
- Series: Cal Innes novels
- Subject: Crime
- Genre: Fiction
- Publisher: Birlinn Ltd
- Publication date: 1 April 2007
- Publication place: Scotland
- Media type: Paperback
- Pages: 248
- ISBN: 1-904598-85-4
- OCLC: 176777039
- LC Class: 2010293778
- Preceded by: Saturday's Child (2006)
- Followed by: No More Heroes (2008)

Donkey Punch (also referred to as Donkey Punch: A Cal Innes book and Sucker Punch) is a crime novel by Scottish author Ray Banks. It was first published in the United Kingdom by Edinburgh-based company Birlinn Ltd in 2007, and again by the same publisher in 2008. In the United States it was published by Houghton Mifflin Harcourt in 2009, titled Sucker Punch, and was reprinted in 2011.

Donkey Punch is part of a series following protagonist Cal Innes, a former convict and private investigator. Innes agrees to accompany a novice boxer from England to a fight in Los Angeles, California. While there, Innes must investigate the subsequent kidnapping of the boxer, while battling his own internal struggles and avoiding trouble with the Los Angeles Police Department.

The Skinny said, "Donkey Punch is as terse and macho as Saturday's Child, although his hardboiled writing style has become more poised and confident." Scotland on Sunday said, "Vivid and realistic, with an appealingly flawed hero and an interesting setting amid the underside of modern LA, this is a knockout." The Plain Dealer said, "Banks' tough-guy prose is irresistible." Associated Press said of the author's writing style, "Innes, for all his faults and problems, is an engaging character with a sharp sense of humor and a ton of turmoil in his life. And Banks, a member of the so-called 'Brit grit' movement, has an easy, breezy style that keeps you flipping the pages."

== Author ==
Ray Banks was born in Kirkcaldy, Scotland, and spent two years studying performance art and theatre at Warwick University. Banks said in an interview with the Newcastle Evening Chronicle that leaving Warwick University led him to become a published writer. Banks said, "If I'd stayed on, I probably would have gone down the acting route instead of writing. University isn't for everyone and I discovered that the other writers I know didn't finish their courses either. It was certainly the best thing that happened to me."

Banks' first novel was released in 2004, titled The Big Blind. The Big Blind was inspired by Banks' prior employment as a croupier. His work Saturday's Child was published in 2006 in the UK by Polygon, and in the US by Harcourt. Protagonist character, private investigator Callum Innes, first appeared in Saturday's Child, and was the focus of Donkey Punch. Subsequent books include No More Heroes (2008), Gun (2008), Beast of Burden (2009), California (2011), and Dead Money (2011). Banks has also contributed short stories for collected works and to a website called Noir Originals.

== Publication history ==
Donkey Punch was first published in Edinburgh by Polygon Books, an imprint of Birlinn Ltd which publishes fiction, in 2007, and again by Birlinn Ltd on 1 February 2008. It was published in the US under the title Sucker Punch by Houghton Mifflin Harcourt in 2009, and again by the same publisher in 2011.

== Plot ==
The book follows protagonist Cal Innes, a private investigator and former convict whose parole after being released from HM Prison Manchester is finished. He is employed as a caretaker of a boxing gym called the Lads' Club managed by Paulo Gray in Manchester. Innes has allegiance to an influential criminal figure named Morris Tiernan, also known as Uncle. Innes agrees to a request from Uncle to accompany a novice 17-year-old boxer named Liam Wooley to a significant boxing match in Los Angeles.

Once there, Innes becomes acquainted over drinks with a former boxer named Nelson Byrne. The job, originally intended to be looking after Wooley, becomes a sinister operation as Innes learns there may be impropriety related to the fight. Innes deals with his dependence on codeine and alcohol along with Wooley's anger management problems. Innes finds himself in a difficult situation in an unfamiliar city, suffers a gunshot wound and his charge Wooley is involuntarily subdued with medication and kidnapped. Innes becomes the suspect in a murder investigation by the Los Angeles Police Department, finds and rescues Wooley and learns that his supposed friend Byrne was the culprit. After being exonerated by the police, Innes escorts Wooley back to England.

== Reception ==
Reviewer Gareth K. Vile of The Skinny gave the book three out of five stars, and commented, "By transplanting his thuggish noir from Manchester to LA, Ray Banks' second Cal Innes novel has two sets of mean streets to pace. Not that his grasp of characterisation has gotten any stronger: Donkey Punch is as terse and macho as Saturday's Child, although his hardboiled writing style has become more poised and confident." Andrea Mullaney reviewed the book for Scotland on Sunday and wrote, "Vivid and realistic, with an appealingly flawed hero and an interesting setting amid the underside of modern LA, this is a knockout."

Les Roberts gave the book a favourable review for The Plain Dealer and wrote, "Much of Innes' narration is East London slang, generously laced with profanities and hard for Americans to grasp. But Banks' tough-guy prose is irresistible." Writing for Electric City, James Crane suggested readers read The Maltese Falcon before beginning Banks' book, and said the story is a step-down from Guy Noir and Sin City. Crane wrote, "I enjoy the hard-boiled style ... It certainly isn't a new formula, though Ray Banks does follow it well."

Chris Talbott gave Donkey Punch a mixed assessment for the Associated Press and wrote, "Innes, for all his faults and problems, is an engaging character with a sharp sense of humor and a ton of turmoil in his life. And Banks, a member of the so-called 'Brit grit' movement, has an easy, breezy style that keeps you flipping the pages." Talbott concluded, "Pretty standard stuff, but done with enough style and wit to make us pick up the next book in the series."

== See also ==
- Amateur boxing
- Boxing
- Crime comics
- Crime fiction
- Crime Writers' Association
- Detective fiction
- Hardboiled
- List of crime writers
- Mystery fiction
- Mystery film
- The Top 100 Crime Novels of All Time
- Whodunit
