= Balloon phobia =

Fear of balloons

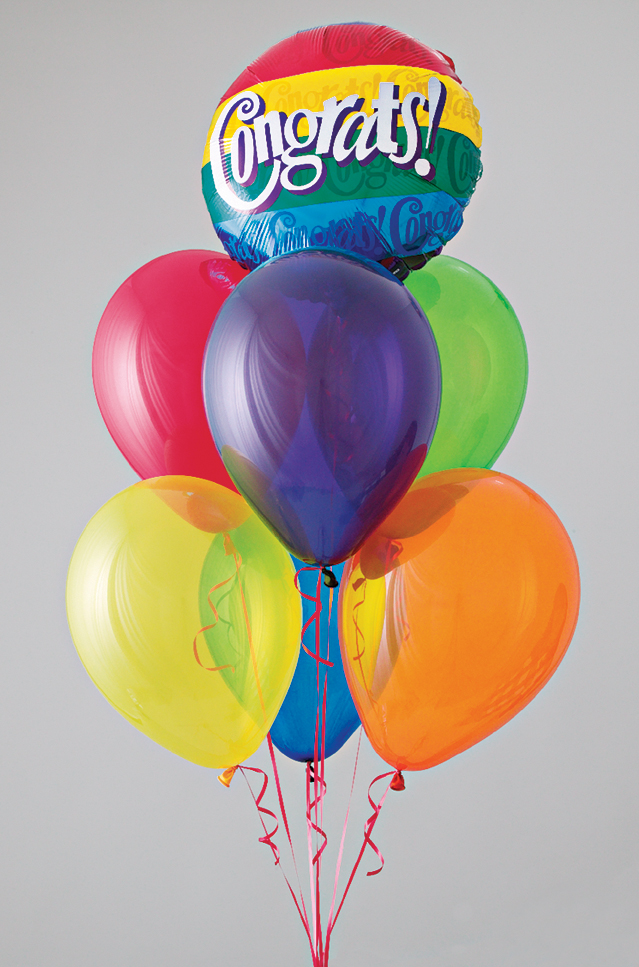
People with globophobia might avoid parties in fear of balloons being present.

Balloon phobia or globophobia is a fear of balloons. The most common source of fear is the sound of balloons popping (making it a form of phonophobia), but individuals can also be triggered by their texture and smell. Generally, people with globophobia will refuse to touch, feel, smell, or go near a balloon for fear it will burst.

== Etymology ==
Globophobia originates from the Latin word globus meaning sphere and the Greek word phóbos which translates to fear.

== Signs and symptoms ==
Indications that someone suffers from globophobia include:

- Feelings of intense fear and anxiety from balloons
- A fear of balloons that lasts a minimum of six months
- Engaging in avoidance behavior when in the presence of balloons
- A fear of balloons that interferes with day-to-day life

Globophobia has numerous symptoms, and most of them overlap with anxiety. Some symptoms of globophobia are:

- Rapid or shallow breathing
- Palpitations
- Shaking, trembling, sweating, and chills
- Gastrointestinal distress, including nausea, vomiting, or stomach pain
- Feeling dizzy or light-headed
- Difficulties swallowing or feeling like something is stuck in one's throat
- A prickling sensation, similar to pins and needles
- A dry or sticky mouth
- Feeling confused or disoriented
- Muscle tension
- Unusual or severe headaches
- Unusual flushing or paleness, particularly in one's face
- Feeling extremely hot or cold
- Fatigue or tiredness
- A lack of appetite
- Insomnia

== Causes ==
Globophobia can be the result of a negative or traumatic experience with balloons, negative depictions of balloons, or a traumatic event somehow connected to balloons. For example, a loud noise could sound similar to a balloon popping. These negative experiences usually occur during childhood, and globophobia is most prevalent among young children.

Other factors that can increase the likelihood of someone developing Globophobia include:

- Having a sensory processing disorder, like autism
- Having another related phobia, such as phonophobia or coulrophobia
- Having a history of anxiety, depression, or panic attacks
- Being a naturally more anxious or fearful person
- Having heightened stress levels

== Treatment ==
=== Response prevention therapy ===
Response prevention is a type of exposure therapy. When dealing with patients with globophobia, a doctor roughly handles a barely inflated balloon in the presence of a patient. The patient will eventually hold the balloon themself to understand that it is not full enough to pop. The balloon will then gradually become more inflated, and once it is filled enough to pop, squeaky noises should be intentionally produced by the balloon. The patients are expected to be frightened by this action, so they should stand a great distance from the balloon and gradually move closer once they feel more comfortable. The same process of patients moving closer to the balloon should be followed except the balloon will pop this time. This practice aims to assure people with globophobia that the noises balloons make are not harmful. Patients are expected to not be as tense and apprehensive around balloons and the sounds they produce following exposure therapy.

=== In vivo flooding ===
This form of exposure therapy was performed on a college-aged student with globophobia. Before the experiment, the unnamed male reports that he tries to avoid balloons at all costs due to the great amount of distress they place on him. He claims that he cannot be any less than four feet away from a balloon without feeling intense fear. The experiment is conducted over the course of three days and involves the subject being surrounded by hundreds of balloons that are simultaneously popping. The researchers found no clear signs of emotional distress of the man but noted him attempting to avoid the popping balloons. Following the experiment's conclusion, the subject states that he does not attempt to avoid situations that may involve balloons anymore. He has also reported that no additional balloon-related problems have intervened with his daily life.

=== Cognitive behavioral therapy ===
Cognitive behavioral therapy or CBT is a common practice used to treat phobias. It works "by deconstructing negative thought patterns surrounding balloons into smaller parts which will be focused on one at a time".

=== Clinical hypnotherapy ===
Hypnotherapy involves relaxation techniques that assist in reducing stress, fear, and anxiety responses. The objective of hypnotherapy sessions is to alter negative thoughts and memories surrounding balloons to generate a less fearful perception on them.

=== Neuro linguistic memory manipulations ===
Neuro linguistic memory manipulations or NLP manipulations entail "seeing yourself and your fears as if you are a third party" to detach yourself from the fear and to minimize the severity of distress balloons might produce.

=== Medication ===
Potential medications to use to treat globophobia include beta blockers, selective serotonin reuptake inhibitors (SSRIs), sedatives, and anti-anxiety relievers.

== Diagnosis ==
The Diagnostic and Statistical Manual, 5th edition (DMS-5) does not include every single phobia, so globophobia is not mentioned. Mental health professionals can instead diagnose patients with a "specific phobia", like globophobia which is "an umbrella term that describes any phobia of a specific object or situation".
