= 6th AVN Awards =

US adult industry award ceremony in 1989

- Date: January 9, 1989
- Site: Tropicana Hotel & Casino, Paradise, Nevada

Highlights
- Best Picture: Pretty Peaches II
- Most awards: Cat Woman (5)
- Most nominations: Amanda by Night II, Portrait of an Affair, Pretty Peaches II (tie, 10)

The 6th AVN Awards ceremony, organized by Adult Video News (AVN), took place on January 9, 1989, at the Tropicana Hotel and Casino in Paradise, Nevada. During the ceremony, AVN Awards were presented in 41 categories, plus several extra awards, honoring pornographic films released between January 1, 1988, and December 31, 1988.

Cat Woman, a shot-on-video feature, won the most awards, with five, while Best Film went to Pretty Peaches II, which won four awards.

== Winners and nominees ==
The nominees for the 6th AVN Awards were announced in the January 1989 issue of Adult Video News magazine. Three movies, Amanda by Night II, Portrait of an Affair and Pretty Peaches II, each had 10 nominations, the most for the year.

The winners were announced during the awards ceremony on January 9, 1989.

=== Awards ===
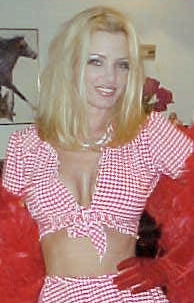
Aja, Best New Starlet winner

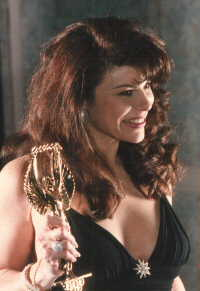
Ona Zee, Best Actress—Feature Film winner

Winners are listed first, highlighted in boldface, and indicated with a double dagger (‡).

Best Feature Film	Best Shot-on-Video Feature
**Pretty Peaches II**‡; Amanda by Night II; Deep Inside Trading; Miami Spice II; Portrait of an Affair	**Cat Woman**‡; Addicted to Love; Black Widow; Case of the Sensuous Sinners; The Final Taboo; Ghostess with the Mostess; Maxine; Raw Talent III; Sinners; Taboo VI
Best New Starlet	Best Actor—Gay Video
**Aja**‡; Kascha; Lynn LeMay; Charli St. Cyre; Amanda Tyler	**Kevin Glover, The Next Valentino**‡; Tom Brock, They Grow ‘Em Big; Randy Cochran, Making It Big; Steve Hammond, Touch Me; Jon Vincent, Heavenly
Best Actor—Feature Film	Best Actress—Feature Film
**Robert Bullock, Portrait of an Affair**‡; John Leslie, Miami Spice II; Herschel Savage, Amanda by Night II	**Ona Zee, Portrait of an Affair**‡; Siobhan Hunter, Pretty Peaches II; Krista Lane, Deep Inside Trading
Best Actor—Shot-on-Video Feature	Best Actress—Shot-on-Video Feature
**Jon Martin, Case of the Sensuous Sinners**‡; Buck Adams, Rockey X—The Final Round; Robert Bullock, Maxine; Jesse Eastern, Beverly Thrillbillies; John Leslie, Dy Nasty; John Leslie, Addicted to Love; Joey Silvera, Angel Puss; Randy Spears, Portrait of a Nymph; Paul Thomas, Sinners; Randy West, The Young and the Wrestling	**Barbara Dare, Naked Stranger**‡; Tracey Adams, Talk Dirty To Me, Part VI; Eva Allen, Ghostess with the Mostess; Champagne, Dreams in the Forbidden Zone; Nina Hartley, Taboo VI; Angel Kelly, Addicted to Love; Ariel Knight, Candy’s Little Sister Sugar; Porsche Lynn, Maxine; Shanna McCullough, Babylon Pink II; Laurie Smith, Sinners
Best Supporting Actor—Feature Film	Best Supporting Actress—Feature Film
**Jamie Gillis, Pretty Peaches II**‡; Robert Bullock, Amanda by Night II; Billy Dee, Amanda by Night II; Mike Horner, Portrait of an Affair; Peter North, Pretty Peaches II	**Nina Hartley, Portrait of an Affair**‡; Tracey Adams, Pretty Peaches II; Crystal Breeze, Head Waitress; Siobhan Hunter, Deep Inside Trading; Krista Lane, Portrait of an Affair
Best Supporting Actor—Shot-on-Video Feature	Best Supporting Actress—Shot-on-Video Feature
**Richard Pacheco, Sensual Escape**‡; Randy Paul, The Horneymooners; Rick Savage, Black Widow; Randy Spears, Case of the Sensuous Sinners; Ray Victory, Cat Woman	**Jacqueline Lorians, Beauty and the Beast**‡; Kimberly Carson, Sinners; Nina Hartley, Sensual Escape; Lynn LeMay, Power Blonde; Sharon Mitchell, Maxine; Alicia Monet, Goin’ Down Slow; Britt Morgan, Taboo VI; Ona Zee, Raw Talent III
Best Director—Feature Film	Best Director—Shot-on-Video Feature
**Alex de Renzy, Pretty Peaches II**‡; Jack Remy, Amanda by Night II; L. Vincent Revene, Deep Inside Trading; Anthony Spinelli, Portrait of an Affair; Svetlana, Miami Spice II	**John Leslie, Cat Woman**‡; Alex de Renzy, Ghostess with the Mostess; Scotty Fox, Case of the Sensuous Sinners; Cecil Howard, Sinners; Robert McCallum, Taboo VI; Henri Pachard, Talk Dirty to Me, Part VI; Jay Paul, Raw Talent III; Candida Royalle, Gloria Leonard, Per Sjostedt; Sensual Escape; Anthony Spinelli, The Last Condom; Paul Thomas, Addicted to Love
Best Director—Bisexual Video	Best Director—Gay Video
**Paul Norman, Bi and Beyond**‡; Richard Mailer, Switch Hitters III; Paul Norman, Bi and Beyond II	**Jim West, The Next Valentino**‡; Jean-Daniel Cadinot, Getting Even; Gunnar Hyde, Minute Man, Series 3; Scott Masters, Head of the Class; John Travis, They Grow ‘Em Big
Best All-Sex Video	Best Compilation Tape
**Angel Puss**‡; Black Fox; Caught from Behind 8; Dreams in the Forbidden Zone; Matched Pairs	**Only the Best of Men's and Women's Fantasies**‡; All My Best, Barbara; The Big Sleazy; Eroticism in Black; Forbidden Worlds; No Man’s Land; Only the Best of Breasts; Rachel Ryan
Best Foreign Release	Best Specialty Tape
**Devil in Mr. Holmes**‡; Bored Games; Cocktail Party; Insatiable Janine; Outrageous Games	**Loose Ends IV**‡; Anal Pleasures; Barbii Bound; Caught from Behind 8; Loose Ends V
Best Softcore Film	Best Made-for-Video Softcore Release
**Erotic Dreams**‡; The Big Bet; Infamous Daughter of Fanny Hill; A Man in Love; Takin' It All Off	**Playboy Playmate Calendar—1989**‡; Drive-in Matinee; Encounters III; Sheer Heaven; Sizzling Spring Break Girls
Best Bisexual Video	Best Gay Video
**Bi and Beyond**‡; Bi and Beyond II; Split Decision; Switch Hitters III	**Touch Me**‡; Minute Man, Series 3; The Next Valentino; Northwest Passage; Top Man
Best Featurette Tape (Series)	Best Selling/Renting Adult Tapes of the Year
**Star Director's Series—Sensual Escape**‡; Parliament Video Magazine Line; Teasers Home Video—First 6 Vol.	Plaques were awarded for Best Selling Adult Tape of the Year to **Miami Spice II**‡ and for Best Renting Adult Tapes of the Year to **Devil in Mr. Holmes**.‡
Best Non-Sexual Performance	Best Sex Scene—Feature Film
**Jose Duval, Pillowman**‡; Jack Baker, Debbie, Class of ’88; Scott Baker, Raw Talent III; Long Chainey, The Sex Life of Mata Hari; William Margold, Born to Burn	**Nina Hartley, Herschel Savage; Amanda by Night II**‡; Krista Lane, Mike Horner; Amanda by Night II; Candie Evans, Marc Wallice; Boiling Desires; Ona Zee, Nina Hartley; Portrait of an Affair; Janette Littledove, Buck Adams; Pretty Peaches II
Best Sex Scene—Shot-on-Video Feature (Couple)	Best Sex Scene—Shot-on-Video Feature (Group)
**Nina Hartley, Richard Pacheco; Sensual Escape**‡; Angel Kelly, Joey Silvera; Addicted to Love; Janette Littledove, Buck Adams; Amorous Adventures of Littledove; Kathleen Jentry, Joey Silvera; Bar scene, Cat Woman; Kathleen Jentry, John Stagliano; Dance Fire; Eva Allen, Tom Byron; Ghostess with the Mostess; Barbara Dare, Tom Byron; Naked Stranger; Alicia Monet, Joey Silvera; Suzie Superstar—The Search Continues; Nina Hartley, Joey Silvera; Taboo VI; Samantha Strong, Mike Horner; Watch Me Sparkle	**Aja, Dana Lynn, Lisa Bright, Blake Palmer, Joey Silvera; Seance/orgy scene, Ghostess with the Mostess**‡; Shanna McCullough, Peter North, Tom Byron, Joey Silvera; Angel Puss; Trinity Loren, Nina DePonca, Shane Hunter; Dream sequence, Dreams in the Forbidden Zone; Shanna McCullough, Ariel Knight, John Leslie; Dy Nasty; Stephanie Rage, Damien Cashmere, bikers; Heiress; Shanna McCullough, Mike Horner, Megan Leigh; Love Lies; Stephanie Rage, Ona Zee, Rick Savage; Raw Talent III; Jerry Butler, others; Subway sequence, Raw Talent III; Barbara Dare, Jennifer Miles, Stephen Ray; Sex in Dangerous Places; Aja, Peter North, Trinity Loren; Surfside Sex
Best Screenplay—Feature Film	Best Screenplay—Shot-on-video Feature
**Harold Lime, Amanda by Night II**‡; Marty Anderson, Mark Ubell; Deep Inside Trading; Phil Cara, Miami Spice II; Michael Ellis, Portrait of an Affair; Alex de Renzy, Pretty Peaches II	**Mark Weiss, John Leslie; Cat Woman**‡; Mark Cushman, Paul Thomas; Addicted to Love; Paul Thomas, Black Widow; Cash Markman, Chad Randolph; Case of the Sensuous Sinners; Michelle Stevens, The Final Taboo; John Leslie, Goin’ Down Slow; Guy Strangeways, Invasion of the Samurai Sluts from Hell; Michael Ellis, The Last Condom; Joyce Snyder, Raw Talent III; Anne Randall, Sinners
Best Art Direction	Best Musical Score
**Maxine**‡; Dreams in the Forbidden Zone; Miami Spice II; Pillowman; Sinners	**Taboo VI**‡; Cabaret Sin; Dreams in the Forbidden Zone; Hawaii Vice; Sensual Escape
Best Film Editing	Best Video Editing
**Alex de Renzy, Pretty Peaches II**‡; Lucas Tele Productions, Amanda by Night II; Giorgio Grande, Devil in Mr. Holmes; Leon Gucci, Head Waitress; David Marsh, Miami Spice	**John Leslie, Cat Woman**‡; Michael Cates, Addicted to Love; Gerard Damiano, Paula Damiano; Candy’s Little Sister Sugar; James MacReading, Dreams in the Forbidden Zone; Alex de Renzy, Ghostess with the Mostess; Marshall Dylan, Hard Core Cafe; Arthur King, Maxine; Adam Della, Pacific Intrigue; John Leslie, Pillowman; Gloria Leonard, James MacReading, Per Sjostedt; Sensual Escape
Best Cinematography	Best Videography
**Mr. Ed, Miami Spice II**‡; Jack Remy, Amanda by Night II; L. Vincent Revene, Deep Inside Trading; Jim Slater, Portrait of an Affair; Alex de Renzy, Pretty Peaches II	**Jack Remy, Cat Woman**‡; Michael Cates, Addicted to Love; Scotty Fox, Case of the Sensuous Sinners; Michael Cates, Conflict; Jane Waters, John Stagliano; Dance Fire; Pablo La Pel, Jane Waters; Dreams in the Forbidden Zone; Tom Hawaii, Pacific Intrigue; Jack Remy, Pillowman; Mot Rebrag, Sensual Escape; Robert McCallum, Taboo VI
Best Boxcover Concept	Best Overall Marketing Campaign
**Screwdriver, Coast to Coast Video**‡; Amateur Night, Coast to Coast Video; Broadway Brat, Vivid Video; Conflict, Vidco; Hawaii Vice, CDI Home Video; Heiress, Vivid Video; Last Temptations of Kristi, Moonlight Entertainment; Loose Ends V, 4-Play Video; Miami Spice II, Caballero Home Video; Where the Boys Aren’t, Vivid Video	**Hawaii Vice, CDI Home Video**‡; Angel’s Back, Intropics Video; Arrow Sell-Through Program, Arrow Films & Video; Caballero Sell-Through Program, Caballero Home Video; Conflict, Vidco; Devil in Mr. Holmes, Paradise Visuals; Good Morning Saigon, Zane Entertainment Group; Loose Ends V, 4-Play Video; VCA Sell-Through Program, VCA Pictures; Vidway's Debut, Vidway
Best Packaging	Best Packaging—Gay Vide
**Broadway Brat, Vivid Video**‡; Back to Rears, Vivid Video; Debbie 4 Hire, AVC; The Final Taboo, Caballero Home Video; Hawaii Vice, CDI Home Video; Heiress, Vivid Video; Jamie Loves Jeff, Vivid Video; Miami Spice II, Caballero Home Video; Screwdriver, Coast to Coast Video; Sex Lies, Fantasy Home Video	**In the Raw, In Hand Video**‡; In the Black, In Hand Video; Mannequin Man, Vivid Video; My Best Buddy, Catalina Video; Ranch Hand, In Hand Video; The Rites of Summer, Vivid Video; Streaks, In Hand Video; Stryker Force, Huge Video; Superhunks, Vivid Video; Taxi, In Hand Video

=== Honorary AVN Awards ===
==== Special Achievement Award ====
AVN Special Achievement Awards were given to three industry members for their legal battles:

- Marty Rothstein of Model Distributors
- Steve Touchin of Bijou Video
- Hal Freeman of Hollywood Video

==== Hall of Fame ====
AVN Hall of Fame inductees for 1989 were: Annette Haven, Tracey Adams, Nina Hartley, Sharon Mitchell, Amber Lynn, Paul Thomas, Alex de Renzy, Henri Pachard. They were all nominated by the readership of Adult Video News magazine.

=== Multiple nominations and awards ===
The following movies received the most nominations:

Nominations	Film
10	Amanda by Night II
10	Portrait of an Affair
10	Pretty Peaches II
9	Miami Spice II
8	Addicted to Love
8	Sensual Escape
7	Cat Woman
7	Dreams in the Forbidden Zone
7	Raw Talent III
7	Sinners
7	Taboo VI
6	Case of the Sensuous Sinners
6	Deep Inside Trading
6	Ghostess with the Mostess
6	Maxine
4	Hawaii Vice
4	Pillowman

The following nine movies received multiple awards:

Awards	Film
5	Cat Woman
4	Pretty Peaches II
3	Portrait of an Affair
3	Sensual Escape
2	Amanda by Night II
2	Bi and Beyond
2	Devil in Mr. Holmes
2	Miami Spice II
2	The Next Valentino

== Presenters and performers ==
The following individuals presented awards or performed musical numbers.

=== Presenters ===
Among those presenting awards were: Samantha Strong, Angel Kelly, Tom Steele, Megan Leigh and Jerry Butler.

=== Performers ===
Actor John Leslie opened the show by singing and playing harmonica. The Moonlight Entertainers were the live band during the show.

== Ceremony information ==
This was the fourth live AVN awards show (there was no show the first two years), and at the time, was the last show still known as the "AVNA Awards" show. It was also the first one that charged admission, with profits going to the Adult Video Association for a legal cause. The event ran 110 minutes.

Hustler magazine said, “The ceremony itself is every bit as tedious as these things have the potential to be.”

Plaques were awarded for Best Selling Adult Tape of the Year to Miami Spice II and for Best Renting Adult Tape of the Year to Devil in Mr. Holmes.

== See also ==
- AVN Award for Best Actress
- AVN Award for Best Supporting Actress
- AVN Award for Male Performer of the Year
- AVN Award for Male Performer of the Year
- AVN Award for Female Foreign Performer of the Year
- AVN Female Performer of the Year Award
- List of members of the AVN Hall of Fame

== Bibliography ==
- "Red-Hot Uncoverage of the Stars in Vegas!". Cinema Blue. United States. July 1989. p. 6.
- "Who Won What: The Adult Video News Awards". Erotic X-Film Guide. Vol. 7, no. 7. United States. July 1989. p. 15.
