= 9th AVN Awards =

US adult industry award ceremony in 1992

- The 9th Annual AVN Awards Show VHS box cover
- Date: January 1992
- Site: Bally’s Hotel and Casino, Paradise, Nevada
- Hosted by: Randy West; Angela Summers; Hyapatia Lee
- Produced by: Anthony Devon
- Directed by: Steven Austin

Highlights
- Best Picture: On Trial 1: In Defense of Savannah, Wild Goose Chase (tie, Best Film)
- Most awards: On Trial 1: In Defense of Savannah (5)

The 9th AVN Awards ceremony, presented by Adult Video News (AVN), honored pornographic films released in 1991 in the United States and took place in January 1992, at Bally's Hotel and Casino in Paradise, Nevada. During the ceremony, AVN presented AVN Awards in 59 categories. The ceremony was produced by Anthony Devon and directed by Steven Austin. Actor Randy West hosted the show for the first time, with actresses Angela Summers and Hyapatia Lee as co-hosts.

On Trial 1: In Defense of Savannah won the most awards with five, but tied for Best Film with Wild Goose Chase, which won four awards. Fetish was the gay movie with the most awards, also winning four.

== Winners and nominees ==
The winners were announced during the awards ceremony in January 1992.

=== Major awards ===
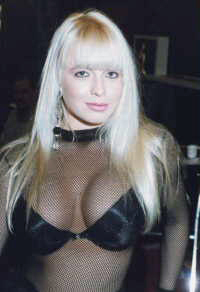
Savannah, Best New Starlet winner

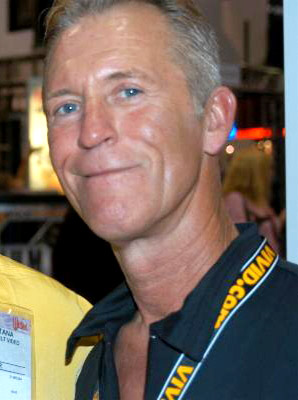
Buck Adams, Best Actor—Film winner

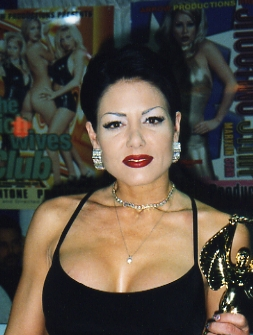
Jeanna Fine, Best Actress—Film winner

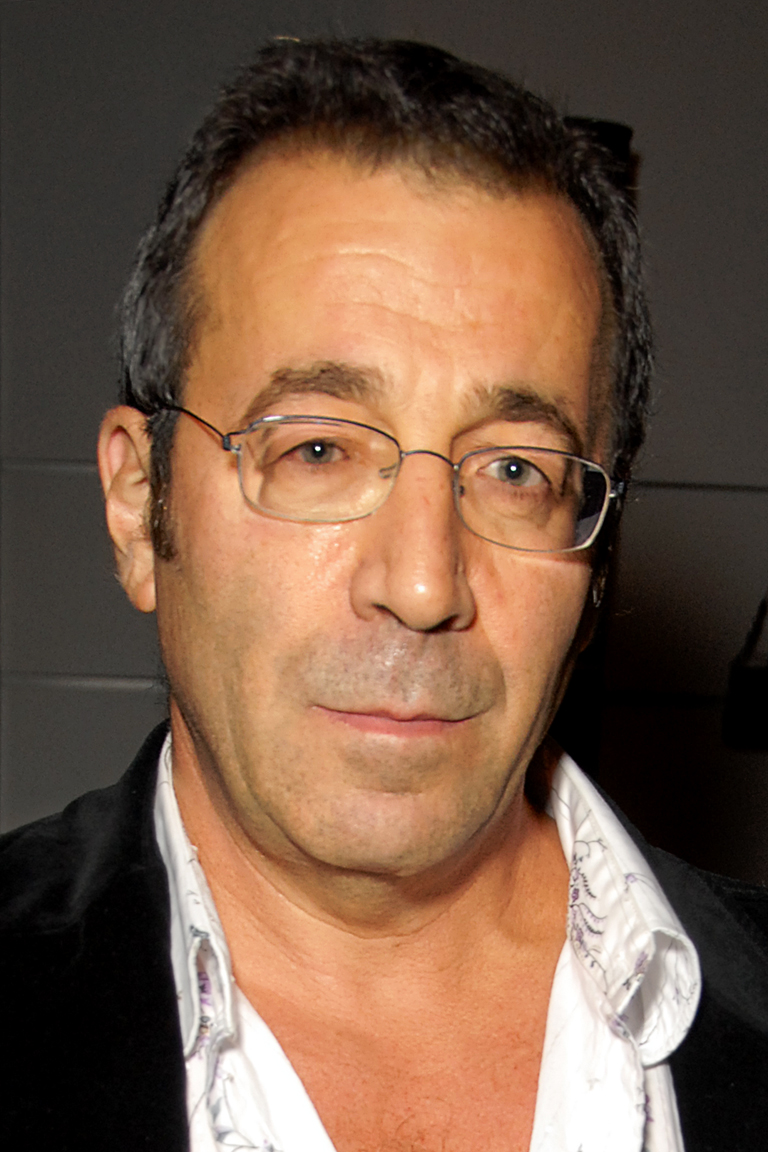
John Stagliano, Best Director—Film winner

Winners are listed first, highlighted in boldface, and indicated with a double dagger (‡).

Best Film	Best Shot-on-Video Feature
**On Trial 1: In Defense of Savannah**‡; **Wild Goose Chase** (tie)‡; Brandy and Alexander; Hothouse Rose Part 1; Imagine; Indian Summer; Lethal Passion; New Wave Hookers 2; Roxy; X Factor—The Next Generation	**Curse Of The Cat Woman**‡; An American Buttman in London; Buttman’s European Vacation; The Cockateer; Deep Inside Centerfold Girls; The Goddaughter; Hate To See You Go; Hunchback Of Notre Dame; Indiscretions; Maddams Family; Mirage; Only Game In Town?
Best New Starlet
**Savannah**‡; Angela Summers
Best Actor—Film	Best Actress—Film
**Buck Adams, Roxy**‡	**Jeanna Fine, Hothouse Rose Part 1**‡; Christy Canyon, Passages
Best Actor—Video	Best Actress—Video
**Tom Byron, Sizzle**‡; Joey Silvera, Indiscretions	**Ona Zee, The Starlet**‡
Best Supporting Actor—Film	Best Supporting Actress—Film
**Jon Dough, Brandy And Alexander**‡; T. T. Boy, Lethal Passion	**Britt Morgan, On Trial 1: In Defense of Savannah**‡
Best Supporting Actor—Video	Best Supporting Actress—Video
**Mike Horner, Bite**‡; Jon Dough, Maddams Family	**Selena Steele, Sirens**‡
Best Director—Film	Best Director—Video
**John Stagliano, Wild Goose Chase**‡; Buck Adams, Lethal Passion; Paul Thomas	**Scotty Fox, The Cockateer**‡
Best Screenplay—Video	Best Tease Performance
**Britt Morgan, Jace Rocker; Cheeks IV: A Backstreet Affair**‡; Cash Markman, Tracy Lynch Britton; Americans Most Wanted; Cash Markman, The Cockateer; Cash Markman, Maddams Family; Cash Markman, Sex Trek II; Killer	**Tianna, Indian Summer**‡; Kym Wilde, Bend Over Babes II
Best Specialty Tape—Big Bust	Best Specialty Tape—Bondage
**Duke of Knockers 1**‡	**Forbidden Fantasies**‡
Best Selling Tape—1991	Best Renting Tape—1991
**New Wave Hookers 2**‡	**The Masseuse**‡
Best Sex Scene, Film	Best Sex Scene, Video (Couple)
**Buck Adams, Raven Richards, Marc Wallice, Taylor Wane; X Factor—The Next Generation**‡ ^{1}	**Rocco Siffredi, Silver; Buttman's European Vacation**‡
Best Sex Scene, Video (Group)	Best All-Girl Sex Scene, Video
**Rocco Siffredi, Silver, Zara Whites; Buttman's European Vacation**‡	**Misty McCaine, Carrie Jones; An American Buttman In London**‡; Tianna, K. C. Williams, Heather Lere, Missy Warner; Buttwoman

=== Additional award winners ===
These awards were also announced at the awards show.

- Best Actor—Gay Video: Ryan Yeager, Jumper
- Best All-Girl Feature: Buttwoman
- Best All-Sex Feature: Buttman's European Vacation
- Best Alternative Adult Release: Love Scenes, Volume One
- Best Amateur Tape: The Hard Drive
- Best Anal-Themed Feature: Dr. Butts
- Best Art Direction—Video: Hunchback of Notre Dame
- Best Bisexual Video: Innocence Found
- Best Boxcover Concept: Derrier, Coast to Coast
- Best Boxcover Concept—Gay Video: Behind the Eight Ball, Vivid Video
- Best Cinematography: John Stagliano, Wild Goose Chase
- Best Compilation Tape: Best of Buttman
- Best Director—Bisexual Video: Paul Norman, Innocence Found
- Best Director—Gay Video: Jean-Daniel Cadinot, The Traveling Journeyman
- Best Editing—Film: On Trial 1: In Defense of Savannah
- Best Editing, Gay Video: Mark Tomas, Brad Braverman; Fetish
- Best Editing—Video: Curse Of The Cat Woman
- Best Featurette Tape: Scarlet Fantasy
- Best Gay Solo Tape: Men Who Work It Alone
- Best Gay Video Feature: Jumper
- Best Music: Wild Goose Chase
- Best Music, Gay Video: “Rude Boy”, Fetish
- Best Newcomer, Gay Video: Danny Sommers
- Best Non-Sexual Performance: Carl Esser, On Trial 1: In Defense of Savannah
- Best Non-Sexual Performance, Gay Video: Sharon Kane, Majestic Knights
- **Best Overall Marketing Campaign** (tie): Blow Out, Infinity Video; Mr. Peepers, the series; LBO Entertainment
- Best Packaging—Film: New Wave Hookers 2, VCA Platinum
- Best Packaging—Gay Video: Behind the Eight Ball, Vivid Video
- Best Packaging—Video: Obsession, CDI Home Video
- Best Pro-Amateur Tape: Mr. Peepers Volume 25
- Best Screenplay—Film: Carl Esser, On Trial 1: In Defense of Savannah
- Best Screenplay—Gay Video: Jim Steel, Prince Charming
- Best Sex Scene—Gay Video: Jason Ross, Ryan Yeager; Fetish
- Best Supporting Actor—Gay Video: Jason Ross, One Night Stands
- Best Videography: Curse of the Cat Woman
- Best Videography, Gay Video: Mark Tomas, Fetish

=== Honorary AVN awards ===
==== Hall of Fame ====
AVN Hall of Fame inductees for 1992 were: Ron Vogel, Rick Savage, Candida Royalle, Hyapatia Lee, Porsche Lynn, Michael Morrison, Mike Horner, Samantha Fox, Herschel Savage, Chris Cassidy, Britt Morgan

=== Multiple nominations and awards ===
The following twelve movies received multiple awards:

- 5 - On Trial 1: In Defense of Savannah
- 4 - Fetish, Wild Goose Chase
- 3 - Buttman's European Vacation, Curse Of The Cat Woman
- 2 - Behind The Eight Ball, Innocence Found, Jumper, Mr. Peepers Volume 25, New Wave Hookers 2

== Presenters and performers ==
The following individuals, in order of appearance, presented awards or performed musical numbers.

=== Presenters ===
Presenters

Name(s)	Role
Ed Powers; Holly Morgan	Presenters of the awards for Best Supporting Actor—Video and Best Supporting Actress—Video
Tonisha Mills; Cal Jammer; Nikki Wilde	Presenters of the awards for Best Supporting Actor—Film and Best Supporting Actress—Film
Raquel Darrian; Wayne Summers; Stacy Nichols	Presenters of the awards for Best Sex Scene in a Film and Best Video Sex Scene: Couple
Taylor Wane; Tianna Taylor; Domonique Simone	Presenters of the awards for Best Group Video Sex Scene, Best All-Girl Sex Scene and Best Tease Performance
Paul Fishbein; Randy West	Presenters of the awards for Best Selling Tape—1991 and Best Renting Tape—1991
Angela Summers; Ron Jeremy	Presenters of the award for Best Screenplay: Video
Hyapatia Lee; Randy West	Presenters of the award for Best Specialty Tape—Big Bust and Best Specialty Tape—Bondage
Shanna McCullough; Sharon Mitchell	Presenters of the award for Best New Starlet
Mike Horner; Ona Zee	Presenters of the award for Best Director—Film and Best Director—Shot-on-Video Feature
Victoria Paris; Sean Michaels; Lynn Lemay	Presenters of the awards for Best Actor—Film and Best Actress—Film
Lois Ayres; Marissa Malibu; Patricia Kennedy	Presenters of the awards for Best Actor—Video and Best Actress—Video
Ashlyn Gere	Presenter of the award for Best Film
Tom Byron; Jeanna Fine	Presenters of the award for Best Shot-on-Video Feature

=== Performers ===
Chi Chi LaRue and the Stingers performed a musical number during the show.

== Ceremony information ==
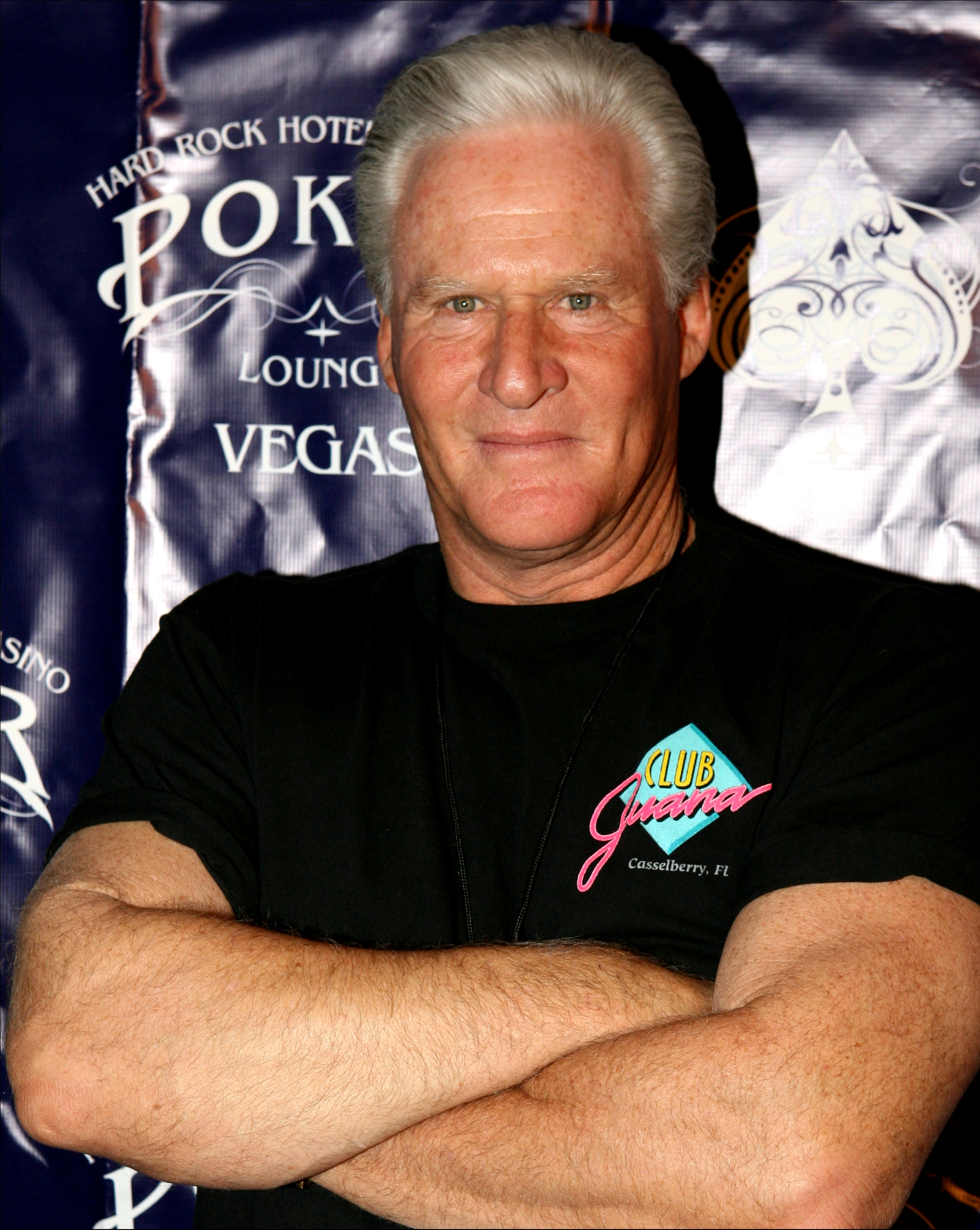
Randy West hosted the 9th AVN Awards

Actor Randy West hosted the show for the first time. His co-host for the first half of the show was Angela Summers while Hyapatia Lee co-hosted the last half. It was the seventh time the awards were presented live in Las Vegas and the first time they were held in the Grand Ballroom of Bally's Casino.

Several other people were involved with the production of the ceremony. The live show was produced by Gary Todd, Mark Stone and Paul Fishbein. A VHS videotape of the show was also published and sold by VCA Pictures, which was produced by Anthony Devon and directed by Steven Austin.

New Wave Hookers 2 was announced as the Best Selling Tape of 1991 while the Best Renting Tape of the year was The Masseuse.

=== Critical reviews ===
High Society magazine termed the awards banquet "awesome." Hot Videos Illustrated said, "As usual, the parade of stars attracted every hot body in Vegas, much to the approval of a horny audience."

== See also ==
- AVN Award for Best Actor
- AVN Award for Best Actress
- AVN Award for Best Supporting Actor
- AVN Award for Best Supporting Actress
- AVN Award for Male Performer of the Year
- AVN Award for Male Foreign Performer of the Year
- AVN Award for Female Foreign Performer of the Year
- List of members of the AVN Hall of Fame

== Notes ==
^1 Ashley Nicole was announced as one of the four winners of the Best Sex Scene—Film category, however, this was an error as she was not in the movie. The correct actress, Taylor Wane, was reported in Adult Video News and Hot Videos Illustrated magazines.

== Bibliography ==
- "Porn Awards! Premier Pussies On Parade". Cheri. United States. July 1992.
- "Porn Star Awards: Licking It In Las Vegas". Hawk. United States. June 1992.
- "Sin City Sex Awards: Porn Stars Cum Out To Play". Live. United States. July 1992.
