= 4th AVN Awards =

US adult industry award ceremony in 1987

- Date: January 9, 1987
- Site: Tropicana Hotel & Casino, Paradise, Nevada
- Hosted by: Paul Fishbein; Barry Rosenblatt

Highlights
- Best Picture: Devil in Miss Jones Part 3: A New Beginning
- Most awards: Blame It on Ginger; Star Angel (tie, 3)
- Most nominations: Devil in Miss Jones Part 3: A New Beginning (11)

The 4th AVN Awards ceremony, organized by Adult Video News (AVN), took place on January 9, 1987 at the Tropicana Hotel Grand Ballroom in Paradise, Nevada. During the ceremony, AVN Awards were presented in 32 categories honoring excellence in the world of adult movies released on videocassette between January 1 and December 31, 1986. The show was hosted by Adult Video News co-publishers Paul Fishbein and Barry Rosenblatt.

The Best Shot-on-Video Feature, Blame It on Ginger won the most awards, with three. Star Angel also won three, however, Devil in Miss Jones Part 3: A New Beginning won Best Picture.

== Winners and nominees ==
The nominees for the 4th AVN Awards were announced in the January 1987 issue of Adult Video News magazine. Devil in Miss Jones Part 3: A New Beginning led all nominees with 11.

The winners were announced during the awards ceremony on January 9, 1987.

=== Awards ===
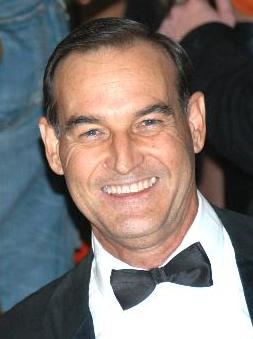
Mike Horner, Best Actor winner

Winners are listed first, highlighted in boldface, and indicated with a double dagger (‡).

Best Picture	Best Shot-on-Video Feature
**Devil in Miss Jones Part 3: A New Beginning**‡; Ecstasy Girls II; Irresistible II; Sexually Altered States; Star Angel	**Blame It on Ginger**‡; Club Exotica; Debbie Duz Dishes; Deep Inside Vanessa Del Rio; Ex Connection; Farmer’s Daughters; In All the Right Places; The Passion Within; Sweat; White Women
Best All-Sex Film	Best New Starlet
**Wild Things**‡; Caught From Behind 6; Wild Things II	**Barbara Dare**‡; Blondi; Careena Collins; Candie Evans; Porsche Lynn
Best Actor	Best Actress
**Mike Horner, Sexually Altered States**‡; Jack Baker, Devil in Miss Jones Part 3: A New Beginning; Jerry Butler, Star Angel; Ron Jeremy, Flesh and Fantasy; John Leslie, Blonde Heat	**Colleen Brennan, Getting Personal**‡; Kimberly Carson, Peeping Tom; Alexandria Greco, Irresistible II; Taija Rae, She’s So Fine; Sheri St. Clair, Voyeur
Best Actor—Shot-on-Video	Best Actress—Shot-on-Video
**Buck Adams, Rockey X**‡; Billy Dee, Flasher; Jamie Gillis, Sweet Revenge; John Leslie, The Passion Within; Harry Reems, Lucky In Love	**Nina Hartley, Debbie Duz Dishes**‡; Danielle, Unnatural Phenomenon II; Keisha, Seduction of Jennifer; Shanna McCullough, Ecstasy; Sheri St. Clair, Sweet Revenge
Best Supporting Actor	Best Supporting Actress
**Joey Silvera, She's So Fine**‡; Robert Bullock, Sexually Altered States; Jamie Gillis, Thought You’d Never Ask; Herschel Savage, If My Mother Only Knew; Paul Thomas, Ecstasy Girls II	**Colleen Brennan, Star Angel**‡; Sharon Kane, She’s So Fine; Taija Rae, Star Angel; Stevie Taylor, Ribald Tales of Canterbury; Tigr, Star Angel
Best Director	Best Shot-on-Video Director
**Cecil Howard, Star Angel**‡; Arthur Ben, Sexually Altered States; Gregory Dark, Devil in Miss Jones Part 3: A New Beginning; Alex de Renzy, Wild Things; Robert McCallum, Ecstasy Girls II	**Jerome Tanner, Club Exotica**‡; Stuart Canterbury, Ex Connection; Eric Edwards, In All the Right Places; Henri Pachard, Blame It on Ginger; Anthony Spinelli, Sweat
Best Gay Video	Best Director—Gay Video
**Powertool**‡; Below the Belt; Bigger than Life; Dynastud; Two Handfuls	**John Travis, Powertool**‡; Lancer Brooks, Nightcrawlers; David Hurles, I Rick; Christopher Rage, My Masters; Matt Sterling, Bigger Than Life
Best Bisexual Video	Best Foreign Film
**Bisexual Fantasies**‡; Passion by Fire: The Big Switch Part 2; Bi-Bi Love	**Comeback of Marilyn**‡; Sex Resort; Shared With Strangers
Best Shot-on-Video Featurette Tape	Best Specialty Tape
**Foxy Lady's Candid Camera**‡; Christine’s Secret; Midnight Zone	**Caught From Behind V**‡; Bizarre Encounters; White Bun Busters
Best Total Sexual Content	Best Total Sexual Content—Shot-on-Video
**Devil in Miss Jones Part 3: A New Beginning**‡; Ecstasy Girls II; Irresistible II; Star Angel; Wild Things	**Blame It on Ginger**‡; Club Exotica; Debbie Duz Dishes; Deep Inside Vanessa Del Rio; White Women
Best Sex Scene	Best Shot-on-Video Sex Scene
**John Leslie, Robin Cannes; Wild Things**‡; Amber Lynn, Peter North, Marc Wallice; Devil in Miss Jones Part 3: A New Beginning; Buck Adams, Nina Hartley; Peeping Tom; Jerry Butler, Sharon Mitchell; She’s So Fine; Taija Rae, Ron Jeremy; Star Angel	**Joey Silvera, Krista Lane; Blame It on Ginger**‡; Barbara Dare, Ginger Lynn, Peter North, Tom Byron; Orgy scene, Blame It on Ginger; John Leslie, Careena Collins, Candie Evans, Krista Lane; Farmer’s Daughters; Candie Evans, Tom Byron; In Search of the Golden Bone; Kari Fox, Peter North; Skin Games
Best Screenplay	Best Screenplay—Shot-on-Video
**Pamela Penn, Sexually Altered States**‡; Tim McDonald, Blonde Heat; Gregory Dark, Johnny Jump-Up; Devil in Miss Jones Part 3: A New Beginning; Harold Lime Jr., Ecstasy Girls II; June Moon, Irresistible II	**John Ferguson, Debbie Duz Dishes**‡; Clinton Darke, Farmer’s Daughters; Will Kelly, The Passion Within; Buck Adams, Pam Rhodes; Rockey X; Michael Ellis, Sweat
Best Cinematography	Best Art Direction
**Sandy Beach, Star Angel**‡; Jon Fontana, Behind the Green Door: the Sequel; Bob Vosse, Blonde Heat; Junior “Speedy” Bodder, Devil in Miss Jones Part 3: A New Beginning; Don Jones, Henning Schellarut; Lust on the Orient Xpress	**Lust on the Orient Xpress**‡; Behind the Green Door: the Sequel; Devil in Miss Jones Part 3: A New Beginning; Irresistible II; Ribald Tales of Canterbury
Best Editing	Best Editing—Shot-on-Video
**Pearl Diamond, Ribald Tales of Canterbury**‡; Lawrence Legume, Behind the Green Door: the Sequel; Tim McDonald, Blonde Heat; Kay Vic, Devil in Miss Jones Part 3: A New Beginning; Tim McDonald, Lust on the Orient Xpress	**Brian Blake, Club Exotica**‡; Jim Travis, Blame It on Ginger; Hal 9000, Debbie Duz Dishes; Alexander Craig, Deep Inside Vanessa Del Rio; Rodan, Sweat
Best Softcore Release	Best Overall Marketing Campaign
**Electric Blue—Campus Fever**‡; Electric Blue—Behind the Scenes with Marilyn Chambers; Screen Test	**Frequent Buyer's Program, Video X-Pix**‡; Caught From Behind 6, Hollywood Video; Club Ginger, Vivid Video; Devil in Miss Jones Part 3: A New Beginning, VCA Pictures; Rebate Program, Essex Video; Red Garter, Essex Video; Revenge of the Babes, L.A. Video
Best Packaging—Feature Film	Best Packaging—Shot-on-Video
**Lust on the Orient Xpress, Caballero Home Video**‡; Devil in Miss Jones Part 3: A New Beginning, VCA Pictures; Irresistible II, Essex Video; Blonde Heat, VCA Pictures; Red Garter, Essex Video	**Club Ginger, Vivid Video**‡; Blame It on Ginger, Vivid Video; Club Exotica, Western Visuals; Cheerleader Academy, Cinematrex Corp.; Farmer’s Daughters, Western Visuals; Girls of the Chorus Line, Classic Editions Video; Lucy Has a Ball, Moonlight Entertainment; Rears, Vivid Video

=== Honorary AVN Awards ===
==== Hall of Fame ====
AVN Hall of Fame inductees for 1987 were not announced at the awards ceremony, but rather were announced later in the June 1987 issue of Adult Video News magazine.

=== Multiple nominations and awards ===
The following movies received the most nominations:

Nominations	Film
11	Devil in Miss Jones Part 3: A New Beginning
9	Star Angel
7	Blame It on Ginger
6	Irresistible II
5	Blonde Heat
5	Club Exotica
5	Debbie Duz Dishes
5	Ecstasy Girls II
5	Sexually Altered States
4	Farmer's Daughters
4	Lust on the Orient Xpress
4	She's So Fine
4	Sweat
4	Wild Things
3	Behind the Green Door: the Sequel
3	Deep Inside Vanessa Del Rio
3	The Passion Within
3	Ribald Tales of Canterbury

The following nine movies received multiple awards:

Awards	Film
3	Blame It on Ginger
3	Star Angel
2	Club Exotica
2	Debbie Duz Dishes
2	Devil in Miss Jones Part 3: A New Beginning
2	Lust on the Orient Xpress
2	Powertool
2	Sexually Altered States
2	Wild Things

== Presenters ==
The following individuals were among those who presented awards: Amber Lynn, Sharon Mitchell, Bionca.

== See also ==
- AVN Award for Best Actress
- AVN Award for Best Supporting Actress
- AVN Award for Male Performer of the Year
- AVN Award for Male Foreign Performer of the Year
- AVN Award for Female Foreign Performer of the Year
- AVN Female Performer of the Year Award
- List of members of the AVN Hall of Fame

== Bibliography ==
- "The AVN Hall Of Fame—A Poll". Adult Video News. Vol. 2, no. 4. Philadelphia, Pennsylvania: Adult Video News, Inc. June 1987. p. 70. ISSN 0883-7090.
