= 7th AVN Awards =

Adult industry award ceremony in 1990

- Date: January 8, 1990
- Site: Tropicana Hotel & Casino, Paradise, Nevada
- Hosted by: Rick Savage

Highlights
- Best Picture: Night Trips
- Most awards: The Nicole Stanton Story (5)

The 7th AVN Awards ceremony, organized by Adult Video News (AVN), took place on January 8, 1990, at the Tropicana Hotel & Casino in Paradise, Nevada. During the ceremony, AVN Awards were presented in 44 categories honoring pornographic films released the previous year. Actor Rick Savage hosted the show with segment co-hosts Christy Canyon, Barbara Dare and Nina Hartley. Portions of the show were taped for a segment on Entertainment Tonight.

The Nicole Stanton Story won five awards, the most of any feature, however Best Film went to Night Trips, which took three trophies, as did Voodoo Lust. Two awards went to each of Bi and Beyond III, True Love and Undercover.

== Winners and nominees ==
The winners were announced during the awards ceremony on January 8, 1990. The first AVN Awards tie occurred as Victoria Paris and Tori Welles were named co-winners of the Best New Starlet category. Jon Martin won Best Actor for the second consecutive year.

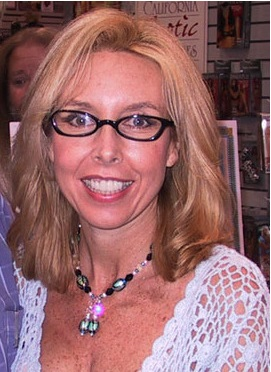
Victoria Paris, Best New Starlet co-winner

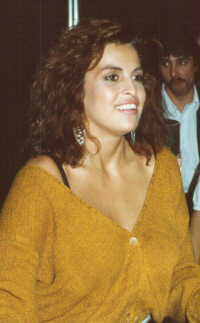
Tori Welles, Best New Starlet co-winner

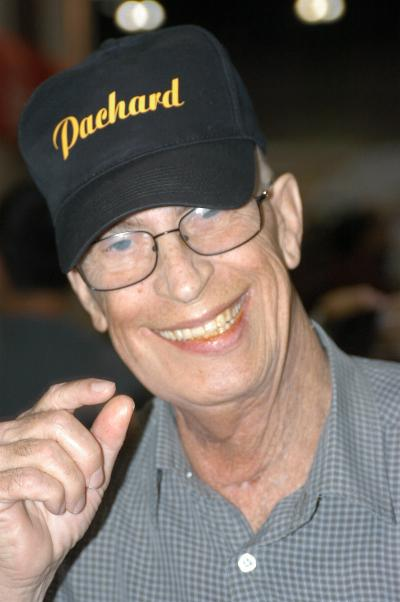
Henri Pachard, Best Director—Film winner

- Best Actor: Jon Martin, Cool Sheets
- Best Actor—Gay Video: Tim Lowe, Fratrimony
- Best Actress: Sharon Kane, Bodies in Heat—The Sequel
- Best All-Girl Feature: Where The Boys Aren't
- Best All-Girl Sex Scene: Barbara Dare, April West; True Love
- Best All-Sex Feature: Hello Molly
- Best Amateur Tape: Bus Stop Tales, Vol. 1
- Best Anal-Themed Feature: Splendor In The Ass
- Best Art Direction—Film or Video: Voodoo Lust
- Best Bisexual Video: Bi and Beyond III
- Best Box Cover Concept: Rain Woman, Coast to Coast Video
- Best Box Cover Concept—Gay Video: Buddy System II
- Best Cinematography: Andrew Blake, Night Trips
- Best Compilation Tape: Only The Best 2
- Best Director—Bisexual Video: Paul Norman, Bi and Beyond III
- Best Director—Feature Film: Henri Pachard, The Nicole Stanton Story I & II
- Best Director—Gay Video: John Travis, Undercover
- Best Director—Shot-on-Video Feature: Jean-Pierre Ferrand, Peter Davy; Voodoo Lust
- Best Editing—Film: The Nicole Stanton Story
- Best Editing—Video: Andrew Blake, Night Trips ^{1}
- Best Gay Video Feature: Undercover
- Best Music: My Bare Lady
- Best Newcomer—Gay Video: Brian Yeager, Buddy System
- Best New Starlet: Victoria Paris, Tori Welles (tie)
- Best Non-Sex Role: Nick Random, True Love
- Best Overall Marketing Campaign: Australian Erotica, Parliament Video
- Best Packaging: twentysomething, Episode 3; Vivid Video
- Best Packaging—Gay Video: Davey and the Cruisers
- Best Picture: Night Trips
- Best Screenplay—Feature Film: Rick Marx, The Nicole Stanton Story
- Best Screenplay—Video Feature: Jace Rocker; Cheeks 2: The Bitter End
- Best Sex Scene—Feature Film: Eric Edwards, Sharon Kane; Firestorm 3
- Best Sex Scene—Gay Video: Lon Flexxe, Bill Marlowe; Heat in the Night
- Best Sex Scene—Group: Marc Wallice, Blake Palmer, Randy West, Jesse Eastern, Debi Diamond; Gang Bangs II
- Best Sex Scene—Video Feature: Tom Byron, Debi Diamond; The Chameleon
- Best Shot-on-Video Feature: Mad Love
- Best Softcore Release: Party Favors
- Best Specialty Tape: Wild Thing
- Best Supporting Actor (Film & Video): Rick Savage, The Erotic Adventures of Bedman & Throbbin
- Best Supporting Actress (Film & Video): Viper, Mystery of the Golden Lotus
- Best Tease Performance: Tracey Adams, The Adventures of Buttman
- Best Videography: Voodoo Lust
- Top Renting Release of the Year: The Nicole Stanton Story
- Top Selling Release of the Year: The Nicole Stanton Story

=== Honorary AVN Awards ===
==== Hall of Fame ====
AVN Hall of Fame inductees for 1990 were: Lesllie Bovee, Jamie Gillis, Ron Jeremy, Gloria Leonard, Bruce Seven, Joey Silvera. The six were all nominated by the readership of Adult Video News.

=== Multiple nominations and awards ===
The following six movies received multiple awards:

- 5 - The Nicole Stanton Story I & II
- 3 - Night Trips, Voodoo Lust
- 2 - Bi and Beyond III, True Love, Undercover

== Presenters and performers ==
=== Performers ===
The Moonlight Entertainers provided the music, while comics Bill Hicks, Frank Barnett and Scott Schwartz provided comedy segments and Chi Chi LaRue sang “Wild Thing”.

== Ceremony information ==
Actor Rick Savage hosted the show. He had three co-hosts for different portions of the awards show: Christy Canyon, Barbara Dare and Nina Hartley.

New categories added this year included: Best Amateur Tape and Best Tease Performance.

The Nicole Stanton Story was named top renting release of the year and also top selling release of the year.

== See also ==
- AVN Award for Best Actress
- AVN Award for Best Supporting Actress
- AVN Award for Male Performer of the Year
- AVN Award for Male Foreign Performer of the Year
- AVN Award for Female Foreign Performer of the Year
- AVN Female Performer of the Year Award
- List of members of the AVN Hall of Fame

== Notes ==
^1 Night Trips, a film, was edited on video.
