= AVN Award for Best Actor =

Pornographic film award presented annually by AVN

- AVN award for contributions of actors to pornography
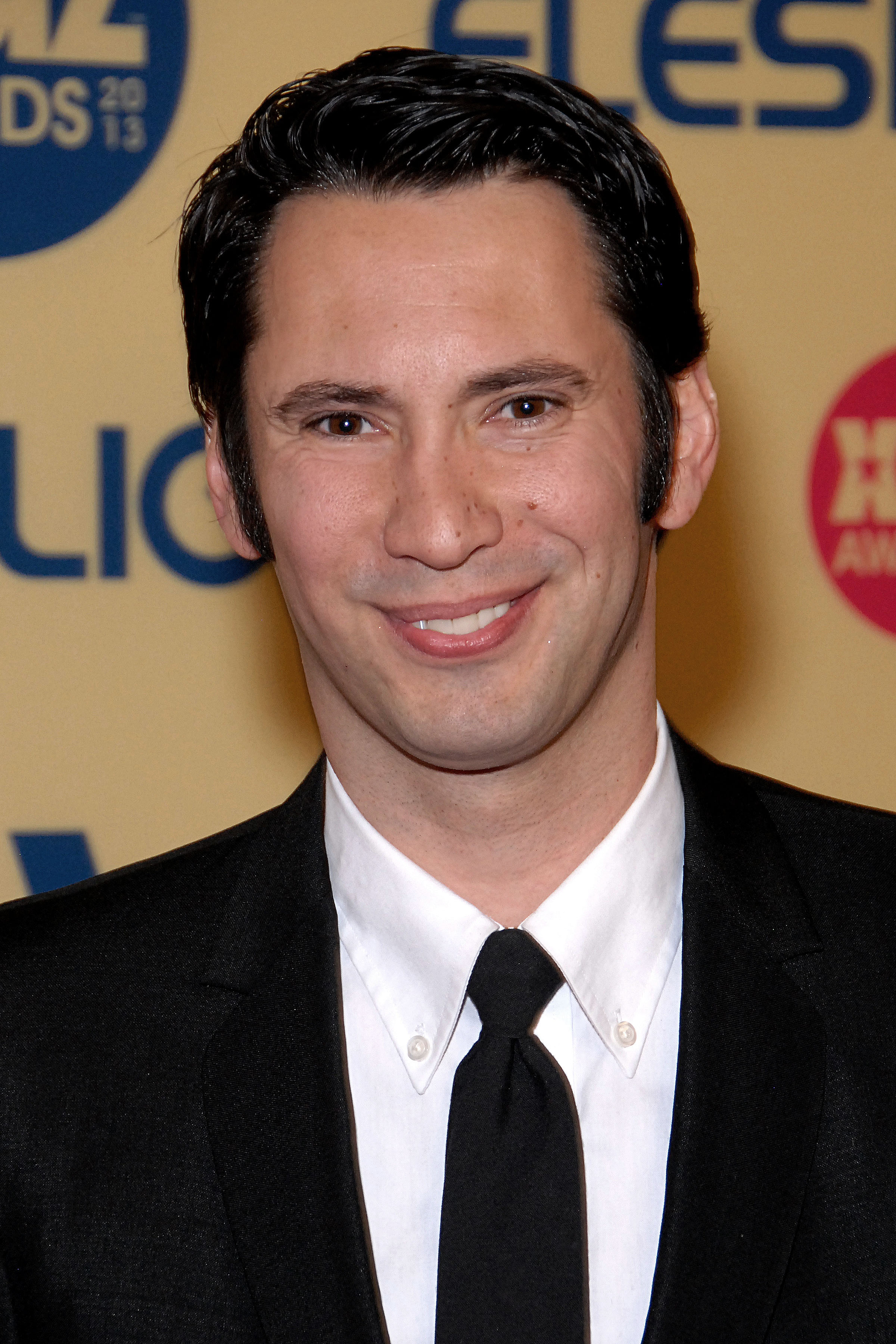
- The 2026 recipient: Tommy Pistol
- Awarded for: Best Performance by an Actor in a Leading Role
- Sponsored by: AVN
- Location: Las Vegas
- Country: USA
- Presented by: AVN Media Network
- First award: 1984; 42 years ago
- Final award: 2026
- Most recent winner: Tommy Pistol; Strip (2026)

Highlights
- Most wins: Tommy Pistol (6 awards)
- Total awarded: 65 (42–for films, 23–for videos)
- First winner: Richard Pacheco; Irresistible (1984)
- Website: avnawards.avn.com

The AVN Award for Best Actor is an award that has been given annually by sex industry company AVN since the award's inception in 1984. Until 2008, the award was awarded annually for two different categories–film and video. From 2009, it is awarded annually for a single category. First recipient of the award was Richard Pacheco, who was awarded at the 1st AVN Awards in 1984 for his performance in Irresistible. As of January 2026, Tommy Pistol is the most honored pornographic actor with six awards followed by Mike Horner, Randy Spears, Evan Stone with five awards, Steven St. Croix, Tom Byron and Seth Gamble with four awards, Buck Adams and Eric Edwards with three awards while six pornographic actors–Jon Dough, Dale DaBone, Brad Armstrong, Robert Bullock, Jon Martin and James Bonn–have won the award two times. Jamie Gillis is the oldest recipient of the award at the age of 53 for his performance in Bobby Sox (1997) and Steven St. Croix is the youngest recipient of the award at the age of 26 for his performance in Chinatown (1995). Two pornographic actors, Mike Horner and Tom Byron, have each won in the most decades–three. The most recent recipient is Tommy Pistol, who was honored at the 43rd AVN Awards in 2026 for his performance in Strip.

== Winners and nominees ==
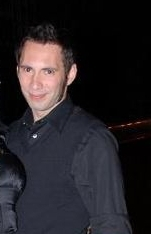
Tommy Pistol has been the most frequent winner of the award (six times).
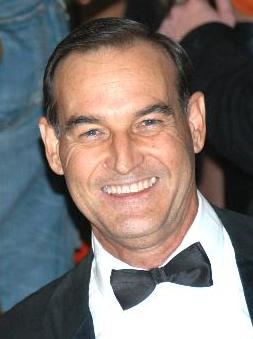
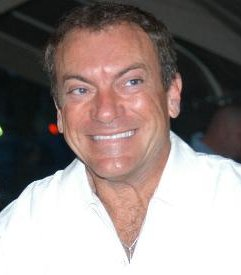
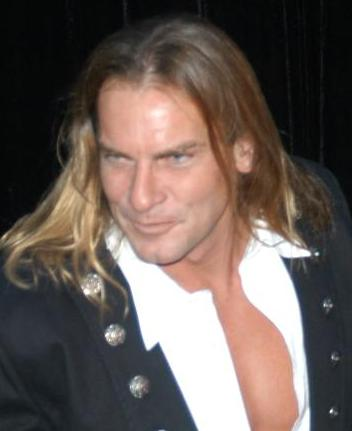
From top to bottom: Mike Horner, Randy Spears and Evan Stone have won the award five times each.

As of 2026, this honor has been awarded 65 times. Until 2009, the awards made a distinction between the film and video categories with exceptions in the years 1984, 1985 and 1990 when only a film or a video category was recognized but not both. Only the film category was retained starting 2009.

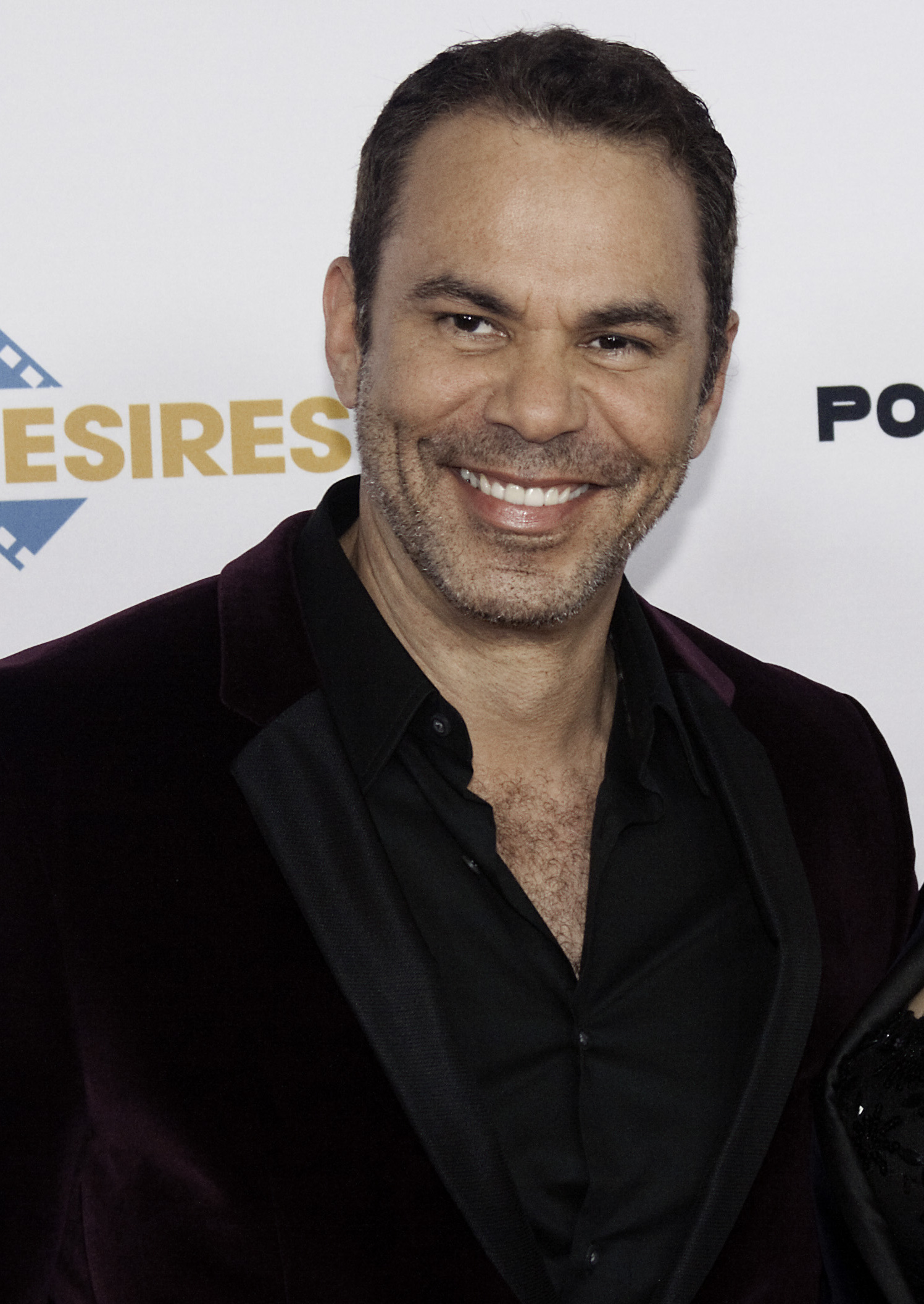
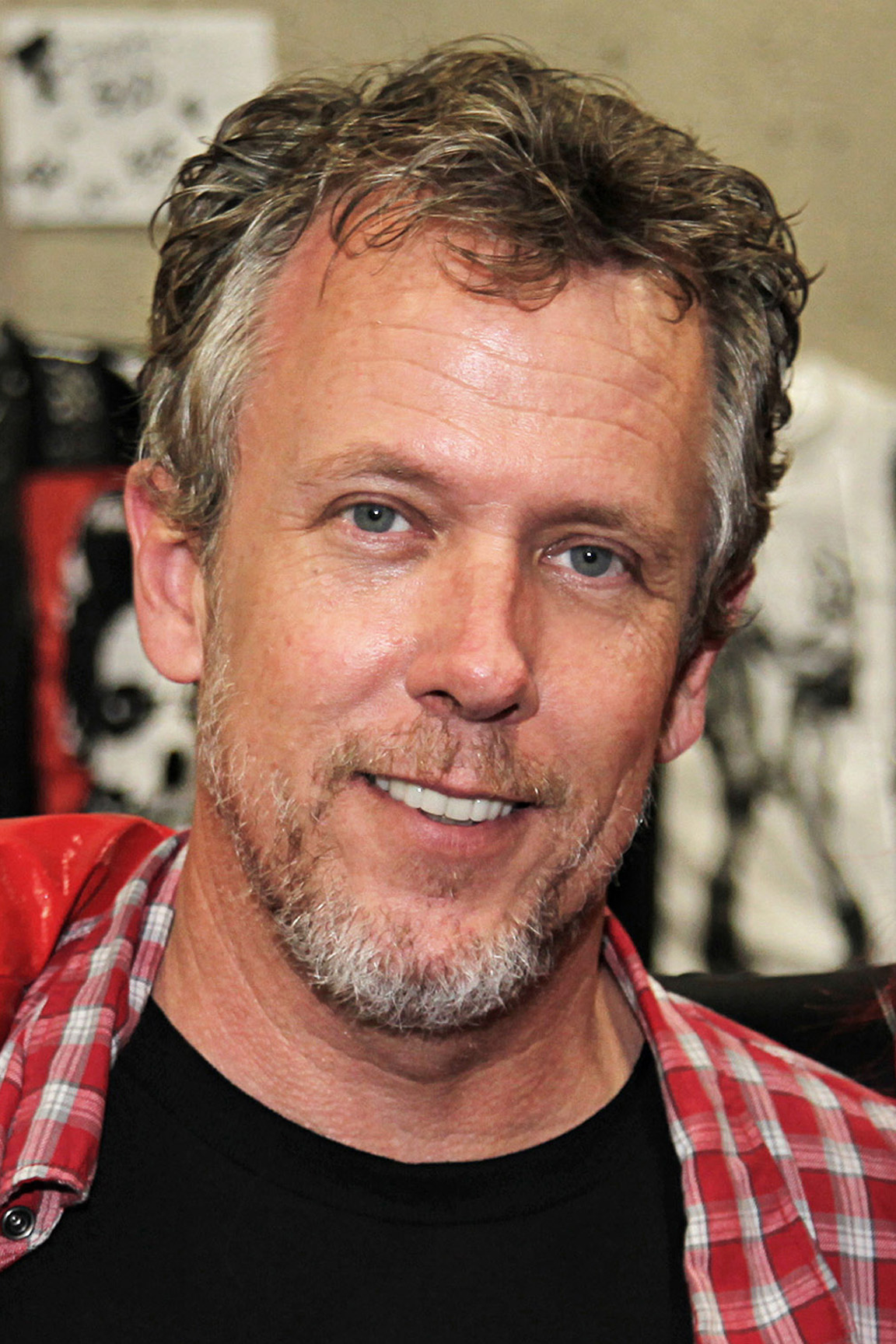
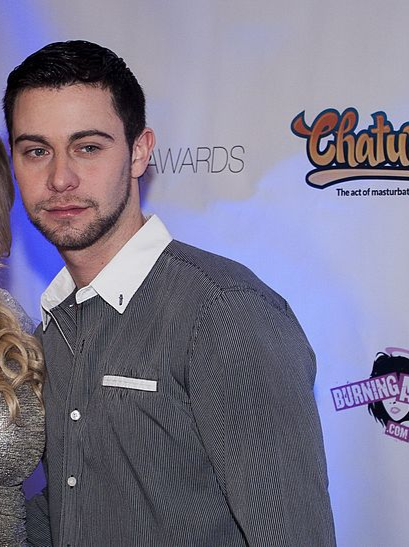
From top to bottom: Steven St. Croix, Tom Byron and Seth Gamble have won the award four times each.
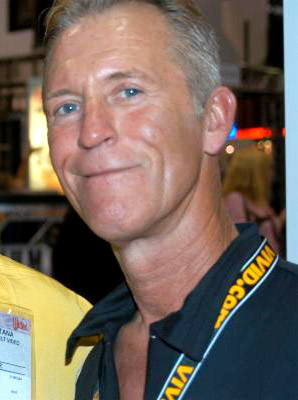
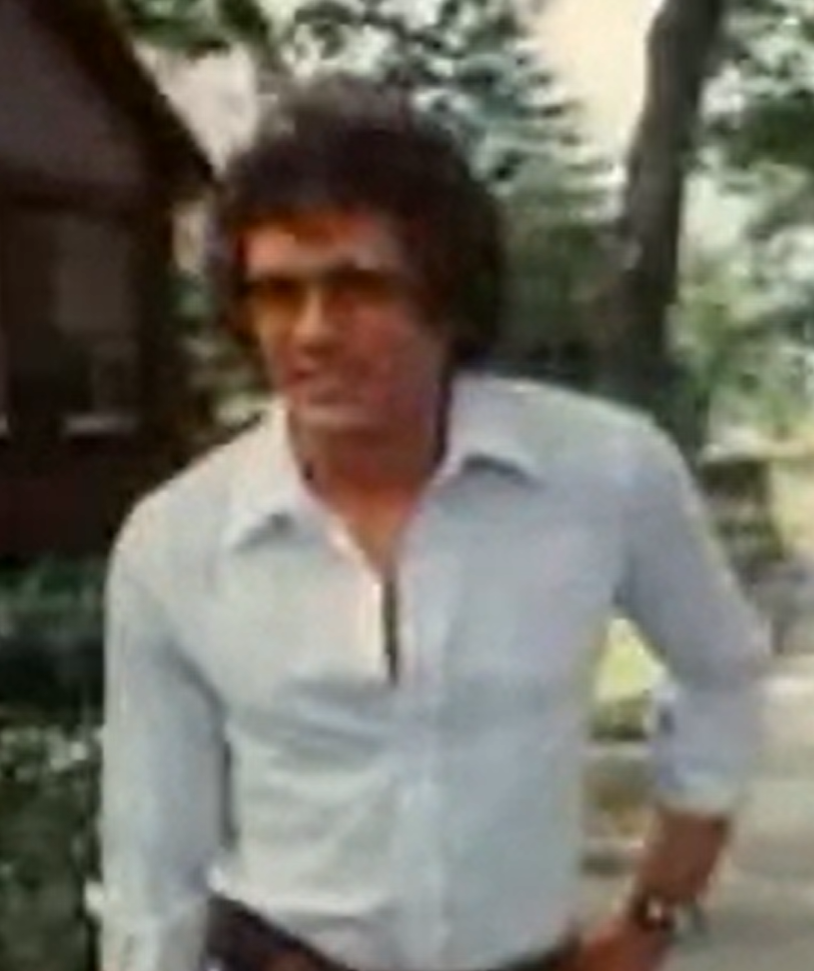
Buck Adams and Eric Edwards has won the award three times.
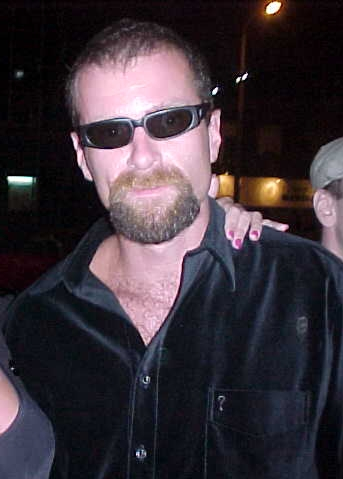
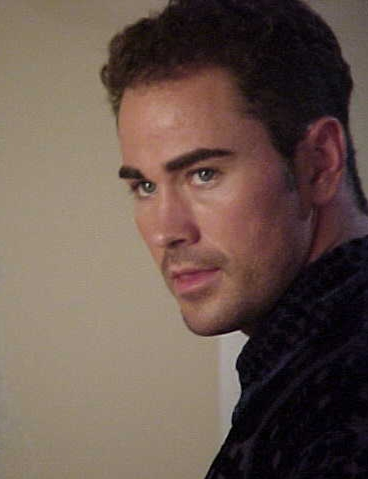
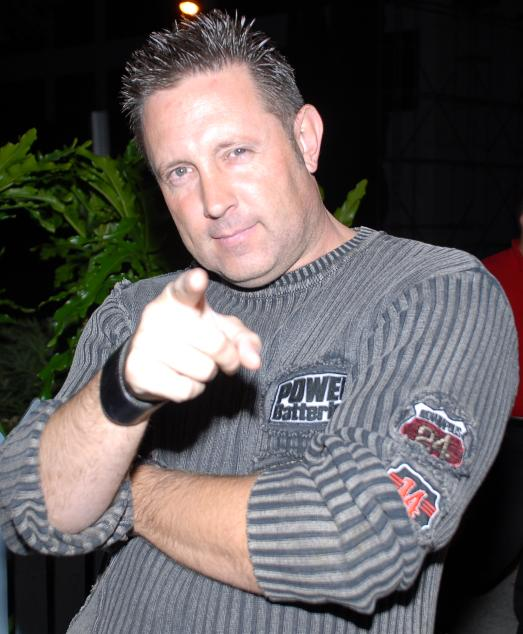
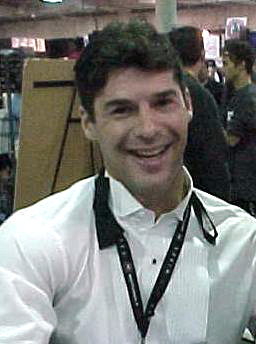
From top to bottom: Jon Dough, Dale DaBone, Brad Armstrong and James Bonn have won the award two times each.

=== 1980s ===
Year	Photo	Winner	Film/Video	Nominees	Ref(s)
1984 (1st)		Richard Pacheco	Irresistible (f)	–	
1985 (2nd)		Eric Edwards	X Factor (f)	–	
1986 (3rd)		Harry Reems	Trashy Lady (f)	–	
1986 (3rd)		Eric Edwards	Dangerous Stuff (v)	–	
1987 (4th)		Mike Horner	Sexually Altered States (f)	Jack Baker, Devil in Miss Jones Part 3: A New Beginning; Jerry Butler, Star Angel; Ron Jeremy, Flesh and Fantasy; John Leslie, Blonde Heat	
1987 (4th)		Buck Adams	Rockey X (v)	Billy Dee, Flasher; Jamie Gillis, Sweet Revenge; John Leslie, The Passion Within; Harry Reems, Lucky In Love	
1988 (5th)		John Leslie	Firestorm II (f)	–	
1988 (5th)		Robert Bullock	Romeo and Juliet (v)	–	
1989 (6th)		Robert Bullock	Portrait of an Affair (f)	John Leslie, Miami Spice II; Herschel Savage, Amanda by Night II	
1989 (6th)		Jon Martin	Case of the Sensuous Sinners (v)	Buck Adams, Rockey X—The Final Round; Robert Bullock, Maxine; Jesse Eastern, Beverly Thrillbillies; John Leslie, Dy Nasty; John Leslie, Addicted to Love; Joey Silvera, Angel Puss; Randy Spears, Portrait of a Nymph; Paul Thomas, Sinners; Randy West, The Young and the Wrestling	

=== 1990s ===
Year	Photo	Winner	Film/Video	Nominee(s)	Ref(s)
1990 (7th)		Jon Martin	Cool Sheets (v)	–	
1991 (8th)		Randy Spears	The Masseuse (f)	Jerry Butler, The Swap; Rick Savage, A Portrait of Christy; Wayne Summers, Radioactive; Randy West, Torrid Without a Cause 2	
1991 (8th)		Eric Edwards	The Last X-Rated Movie, Part 1 (v)	–	
1992 (9th)		Buck Adams	Roxy (f)	–	
1992 (9th)		Tom Byron	Sizzle (v)	Joey Silvera, Indiscretions	
1993 (10th)		Mike Horner	The Seduction of Mary (f)	Rocco Siffredi, Face Dance, Parts 1 & 2	
1993 (10th)		Joey Silvera	The Party (v)	Tony Tedeschi, The Buttsizer	
1994 (11th)		Mike Horner	Justine: Noting To Hide 2 (f)	Jon Dough, New Wave Hookers 3; Steve Drake, Anonymous; Mike Horner, Sex; Randy Spears, New Lovers; Marc Wallice, Endlessly; Marc Wallice, If These Walls Could Talk 1 & 2	
1994 (11th)		Jonathan Morgan	The Creasemaster (v)	T. T. Boy, Neutron Man; Jerry Butler, Puppy Love; Jon Dough, Endangered; Steve Drake, Guilty By Seduction; Mike Horner, Blinded By Love; Jonathan Morgan, Just My Imagination; Steven St. Croix, Arabian Nights; Rocco Siffredi, Frat Girls of Double Double D; Joey Silvera, County Line	
1995 (12th)		Buck Adams	No Motive (f)	Buck Adams, Climax 2000; Buck Adams, Hustlers; Jon Dough, Affairs of the Heart; Jon Dough, The Swap Part 2; Jonathan Morgan, Who Killed Holly Hollywood?; Gerry Pike, Sex; Steven St. Croix, Dog Walker; Marc Wallice, The Swap Part 2	
1995 (12th)		Steven St. Croix	Chinatown (v)	Buck Adams, Gemini; Randy Spears, Bad Habits; Tony Tedeschi, Babe Magnet; Randy West, Fantasy Exchange; Jon Dough, The Face; Sean Michaels, In the Bush; Mike Horner, three different movies	
1996 (13th)		Mike Horner	Lessons in Love (f)	Jon Dough, Heartbeat; Jonathan Morgan, On Her Back; Steven St. Croix, Cinesex; Steven St. Croix, Blue Movie; Tony Tedeschi, Skin Hunger; Randy West, Companion: Aroused 2	
1996 (13th)		Jon Dough	Latex (v)	Mike Horner, Butt Detective; Jonathan Morgan, Risque Burlesque; Alex Sanders, Strip Poker; Joey Silvera, Fresh Meat; Steven St. Croix, The Romeo Syndrome; Steven St. Croix, Generally Horny Hospital; Tony Tedeschi, Anal Intruder 9: The Butt from Another Planet; Marc Wallice, Candy Factory	
1997 (14th)		Jamie Gillis	Bobby Sox (f)	Buck Adams, Sexual Healing; Christoph Clark, Hamlet; Mark Davis, Oral Addiction; Mike Horner, Lust and Desire; Steven St. Croix, Gangland Bangers; Steven St. Croix, The Show; Tony Tedeschi, Party House; Randy West, Expose Me Again	
1997 (14th)		Jon Dough	Shock (v)	Tom Byron, Gregory Dark's Flesh; Jonathan Morgan, Silver Screen Confidential; Alex Sanders, Stacked Deck; Carter Stone, Whackers; Tony Tedeschi, Heinie's Heroes; Tony Tedeschi, Sue; Vince Vouyer, Hard Evidence; T. T. Boy, NYDP Blue	
1998 (15th)		Steven St. Croix	Bad Wives (f)	Buck Adams, Filth; Mickey G., The Zone; Mike Horner, Africa Rising; Mike Horner, Smoke & Mirrors; Mike Horner, Tight Spot; Jonathan Morgan, Sleaze; Tony Tedeschi, The Heist; Vince Vouyer, Control	
1998 (15th)		Tom Byron	Indigo Delta (v)	Mickey G., Surrender; Dave Hardman, A Pervert Walks Among Us; Mike Horner, Crazed; Mike Horner, Swinging in the Rain; Jonathan Morgan, Makin' Whoopee; Jonathan Morgan, Texas Dildo Masquerade; Wilde Oscar, Moondance; Tony Tedeschi, Blue Dahlia; Valentino, Drop Sex: Wipe the Floor	
1999 (16th)		James Bonn	Models (f)	Tom Byron, Carnal Instincts; Jon Dough, Shipwreck; Mickey G., Love's Passion; Jonathan Morgan, Prey; Wilde Oscar, Eros Instinct; Herschel Savage, Phoenix Rising; Alex Sanders, Appassionata; Kyle Stone, The Kiss; Vince Vouyer, Mobster's Wife	
1999 (16th)		Michael J. Cox	L.A. Uncovered (v)	Tom Byron, Carnal Instincts; Jon Dough, Shipwreck; Mickey G., Love's Passion; Jonathan Morgan, Prey; Wilde Oscar, Eros Instinct; Herschel Savage, Phoenix Rising; Alex Sanders, Appassionata; Kyle Stone, The Kiss; Vince Vouyer, Mobster's Wife	

=== 2000s ===
Year	Photo	Winner	Film/Video	Nominees	Ref(s)
2000 (17th)		James Bonn	Chloe (f)	John Decker, The Trophy; Mickey G., Taxi Dancer; Mike Horner, In the Flesh; Herschel Savage, Nothing to Hide 3 & 4; Randy Spears, Poseur; Bobby Vitale, Talent Scout	
2000 (17th)		Randy Spears	Double Feature! (v)	Brad Armstrong, Knockout; Tyce Buné, Revenge; Tom Byron, Archer's Last Day; Mickey G., Eyes of Desire 2; Mike Horner, Sexplicity; Michael Raven, Mindfuck; Tony Tedeschi, Taboo 18	
2001 (18th)		Evan Stone	Adrenaline (f)	Tyce Bune, True Blue; Dillion Day, Watchers; John Decker, Secret Party; Mike Foster, Jekyll and Hyde; Joel Lawrence, Les Vampyres; Herschel Savage, Dream Quest; Randy Spears, Façade; Bobby Vitale, Façade	
2001 (18th)		Joel Lawrence	Raw (v)	Tyce Bune, Wages of Sin; Dillion Day, Dark Angels; Mike Horner, Prisoner of Sex; Jonathan Morgan, Becoming Wet; Herschel Savage, Spellbound; Randy Spears, Partners Forever; Lexington Steele, West Side; Evan Stone, Paradise Hole; Tony Tedeschi, She Town	
2002 (19th)		Anthony Crane	Beast (f)	Dale DaBone, Fade To Black; Dillion Day, Underworld; Mickey G., Free Sex On Earth; Herschel Savage, Mafioso; Randy Spears, Bad Wives 2; Evan Stone, Taken	
2002 (19th)		Mike Horner	Euphoria (v)	Anthony Crane, Porn-o-Matic 2001; Joel Lawrence, The Hole Truth; Eric Masterson, The Black Room; Randy Spears, Shocking Truth; Steven St. Croix, Planet of the Babes; Valentino, Pimped By An Angel 2; Nacho Vidal, Face Dance Obsession	
2003 (20th)		Brad Armstrong	Falling From Grace (f)	John Decker, Love Games; Dillon Day, Poison Angel; Joel Lawrence, Les Vampyres 2; Rocco Siffredi, The Fashionistas; Steven St. Croix, Paradise Lost	
2003 (20th)		Dale DaBone	Betrayed By Beauty (v)	Brad Armstrong, Heroin; Steve Austin, Pleasureville 2: Shagnet; Baz, The Ozporns; Steve Holmes, Funky Fetish Horror Show; Julian, Naked Eye; Kris Knight, The Ass Collector; Joel Lawrence, Karma; Toni Ribas, The Private Gladiator; Randy Spears, Sex World 2002; Steven St. Croix, Colorblind; Evan Stone, Breathless	
2004 (21st)		Randy Spears	Heart of Darkness (f)	Dale DaBone, Sordid; Joel Lawrence, Mirror Image; Kurt Lockwood, Compulsion; Rafe, Snakeskin; Steven St. Croix, Heaven; Tony Tedeschi, So I Married a Porn Star	
2004 (21st)		Evan Stone	Space Nuts (v)	Brad Armstrong, Not a Romance; Barrett Blade, No Limits; Tyce Bune, The Arrangement; Dillon Day, Phoenix Rising 2; Eric Masterson, Perfection; Herschel Savage, Roommate From Hell; Dick Smothers, Jr., Bad Influence; Randy Spears, The Assignment; Steven St. Croix, Improper Conduct	
2005 (22nd)		Justin Sterling	The Masseuse (f)	Eric Masterson, The 8th Sin; Evan Stone, Dual Identity; Tony Tedeschi, The 8th Sin	
2005 (22nd)		Barrett Blade	Loaded (v)	Brad Armstrong, Fluff and Fold; Joel Lawrence, Erotic Focus; Mr. Marcus, Blue Rain; Eric Masterson, Loaded; Herschel Savage, Love and Bullets; Randy Spears, Misty Beethoven: The Musical; Evan Stone, Faraway; Tony Tedeschi, Chasey’s Back	
2006 (23rd)		Randy Spears	Eternity (f)	Chris Cannon, Scorpio Rising; Nick Manning, Les Bitches; Alec Metro, Les Bitches; Herschel Savage, Dark Side	
2006 (23rd)		Evan Stone	Pirates (v)	Otto Bauer, Catherine; Barrett Blade, Dark Angels 2: Bloodline; Dillon Day, Dark Angels 2: Bloodline; Tommy Gunn, AGP: All Girl Protection; Dean James, Killing Courtney Luv; Dick Smothers, Jr., Dark Deception; Randy Spears, One Man’s Obsession; Steven St. Croix, Undertow; George Uhl, Robinson Crusoe on Sin Island	
2007 (24th)		Randy Spears	Manhunters (f)	Buck Adams, Uninhibited; Tommy Gunn, To Die For; Julian, Janine’s Been Black Maled; Rocco Siffredi, Emperor	
2007 (24th)		Evan Stone	Sex Pix (v)	Brad Armstrong, Women on Top; Van Damage, Intimate Strangers; Manuel Ferrara, Bustful of Dollars; Mike Horner, The New Neighbors; Spyder Jonez, Desperate; Kurt Lockwood, Illicit; Nick Manning, Sacred Sin; Eric Masterson, 3 Wishes; Tommy Pistol, Joanna's Angels 2: Alt Throttle; Reda Semlahen, Sex City; Rocco Siffredi, Fashionistas Safado: The Challenge; Dick Smothers, Jr., Get Luckier!; Randy Spears, Just Like That; Steven St. Croix, Wonderland	
2008 (25th)		Tom Byron	Layout (f)	Rod Fontana, Sex & Violins; Marcos Leon, Layout; Marty Romano, Flasher; Steven St. Croix, Sex & Violins	
2008 (25th)		Brad Armstrong	Coming Home (v)	Barrett Blade, Nowhere Angels; Chris Cannon, Dolores of My Heart; Tony De Sergio, Black Worm; Mike Horner, Not the Bradys XXX; Nick Manning, Spunk'd the Movie; Derrick Pierce, Upload; Tony Pounds, American Dream; Herschel Savage, Delilah; Rocco Siffredi, Fashionistas Safado: Berlin; Justin Slayer, Merc; Randy Spears, Black Widow; Steven St. Croix, Operation: Desert Stormy; Evan Stone, Pulp Friction; Voodoo, Insertz	
2009 (26th)		Evan Stone	Pirates II: Stagnetti's Revenge	Brad Armstrong, Fallen; Barrett Blade, The Wicked; Dino Bravo, Get Smartass; James Deen, The Chauffeur's Daughter; Manuel Ferrara, Pipe Dreams; Mike Horner, Not Bewitched XXX; Tyler Knight, Ransom; Tommy Gunn, Hearts and Minds II: Modern Warfare; Marcus London, Two; Mr. Marcus, Cry Wolf; Tommy Pistol, Horat; Randy Spears, The Last Rose; Justin Sterling, Burn; Lee Stone, This Ain't the Munsters XXX	

=== 2010s ===
Year	Photo	Winner	Film	Nominees	Ref(s)
2010 (27th)		Eric Swiss	Not Married With Children XXX	Ace, The Jeffersons: A XXX Parody; Keni Styles, Pure; Otto Bauer, Everybody Loves Lucy; James Deen, Scrubs: A XXX Parody; Guy DiSIlva, Barrack's Big Stimulus Package; Tommy Gunn, Heaven; Eric Masterson, Hush; Sean Michaels, L.A. Pink; Anthony Rosano, The Sex Files: A Dark XXX Parody; Herschel Savage, 30 Rock: A XXX Parody; Randy Spears, Educating Alli; Evan Stone, Pussy a Go Go; Voodoo, The Cougar Hunter; Frankie Young, Jon & Kate Fuck Eight	
2011 (28th)		Tom Byron	The Big Lebowski: A XXX Parody	Brad Armstrong, 4Some; Paul Chaplin, BatfXXX: Dark Night Parody; Cheyne Collins, The Vampire Sex Diaries; Dane Cross, 3 Days in June; Dale DaBone, Batman XXX: A Porn Parody; Chad Diamond, This Ain't Glee XXX; Ben English, The Condemned; Tommy Gunn, Rawhide 2: Dirty Deeds; Jack Lawrence, Reno 911: A XXX Parody; Mr. Marcus, Savanna's Been Blackmaled 2; Tommy Pistol, Joanna's Angels 3; Rock: The Icon, Fatally Obsessed	
2012 (29th)		Dale DaBone	Elvis XXX: A Porn Parody	James Bartholet, Saw: A Hardcore Parody; Barrett Blade, Killer Bodies; Tom Byron, Runaway; Xander Corvus, Lost and Found; Ryan Driller, Superman XXX: A Porn Parody; Ben English, Official The Silence of the Lambs Parody; Seth Gamble, Saturday Night Fever XXX: An Exquisite Films Parody; Jack Lawrence, Anchorman: A XXX Parody; Ryan McLane, Official Psycho Parody; Tommy Pistol, Taxi Driver: A XXX Parody; Anthony Rosano, Rocky XXX: A Parody Thriller!; Randy Spears, The Orgasm; Evan Stone, This Ain’t Ghostbusters XXX 3D; Mac Turner, The Rocki Whore Picture Show: A Hardcore Parody	
2013 (30th)		Steven St. Croix	Torn	Richie Calhoun, Diary of Love; Xander Corvus, Immortal Love; Dane Cross, A Mother's Love; Richie Deville, My Mother's Best Friend 6; Giovanni Francesco, The Dark Knight XXX: A Porn Parody; Seth Gamble, Star Wars XXX: A Porn Parody; Marcus London, Spartacus MMXII: The Beginning; Eric Masterson, Dallas XXX: A Parody; Brendon Miller, Happy Endings; Tommy Pistol, Pee-Wee's XXX Adventure: A Porn Parody; Anthony Rosano, The Friend Zone; Randy Spears, Men in Black: A Hardcore Parody; Evan Stone, Mork & Mindy: A DreamZone Parody; Jack Vegas, Blow	
2014 (31st)		Tommy Pistol	Evil Head	Richie Calhoun, The Submission of Emma Marx; Dale DaBone, Iron Man XXX: An Axel Braun Parody; Mark Davis, Nobody’s Daughter; James Deen, Watch Over Me; Ryan Driller, Man of Steel XXX: An Axel Braun Parody; Seth Gamble, Just In Beaver Fever; Alec Knight, Breaking Bad XXX: A Sweet Mess Films Parody; Keiran Lee, To Live and Fuck in L.A.; Kurt Lockwood, What Do You Want Me to Say?; Brendon Miller, Divorcees; Kris Slater, Unfaithful; Steven St. Croix, Truth Be Told; Evan Stone, Adventures in Eden; Michael Vegas, Rebound	
2015 (32nd)		Steven St. Croix	Wetwork	Seth Gamble, Cinderella XXX: An Axel Braun Parody; Billy Glide, Silhouette; Tommy Gunn, American Hustle XXX Porn Parody; Kurt Lockwood, 24 XXX: An Axel Braun Parody; Brendon Miller, Thor XXX: An Axel Braun Parody; Tyler Nixon, Aftermath; Logan Pierce, Shades of Kink 2; Tommy Pistol, Austin Powers XXX: A Porn Parody; Alan Stafford, These Things We Do; Jeremy Steele, The Manson Family XXX; Kyle Stone, Owner Gets Clipped; Michael Vegas, Switch	
2016 (33rd)		Tommy Pistol	Stryker	Richie Calhoun, The Submission of Emma Marx: Boundaries; Danny D, The Doctor; James Deen, Stockholm Syndrome; Ryan Driller, Marriage 2.0; Erik Everhard, Broken Vows; Giovanni Francesco, Batman v Superman XXX: An Axel Braun Parody; Seth Gamble, Brothers & Sisters; Danny Mountain, Lock and Load; Tyler Nixon, Housemates 2; Derrick Pierce, Magic Mike XXXL: A Hardcore Parody; Toni Ribas, Bullet to the Top; Ryan Ryder, Peter Pan XXX: An Axel Braun Parody; Michael Vegas, Shades of Kink 4; Chad White, Waiting on Love	
2017 (34th)		Xander Corvus	The Preacher's Daughter	Richie Calhoun, The Submission of Emma Marx: Exposed; Danny D, Sherlock: A XXX Parody; Ryan Driller, True Detective: A XXX Parody; Steve Holmes, The One I Lust; Marcus London, Devil Inside; Ryan McLane, Win a Date With Sophia Blake; Tyler Nixon, This Ain’t Fallout XXX; Tommy Pistol, Suicide Squad XXX: An Axel Braun Parody; Ryan Ryder, Storm of Kings: XXX Parody; Steven St. Croix, Color Blind; Evan Stone, The Donald; Nacho Vidal, Outland: Beyond the Far West; Chad White, The Marine; Aaron Wilcoxxx, Fragment of Love	
2018 (35th)		Tommy Pistol	Ingenue	Brad Armstrong, Takers; Danny D, Bulldogs; Charles Dera, Half His Age: A Teenage Tragedy; Damon Dice, From the First Moment; Ryan Driller, An Inconvenient Mistress; Seth Gamble, Karma; Tyler Knight, Interracial Family Needs; Marcus London, Unbridled; Derrick Pierce, Indirect Relations; Logan Pierce, The Voyeur; Toni Ribas, Blood Sisters; Ryan Ryder, The Altar of Aphrodite; Nacho Vidal, Outland 2: Looking for Freedom; Chad White, Laura	
2019 (36th)		Seth Gamble	Deadpool XXX: An Axel Braun Parody	Brad Armstrong, The Cursed XXX; Johnny Castle, The Finisher: A DP XXX Parody; Xander Corvus, Xander's World Tour; Danny D, NeverMore; James Deen, Starfucked; Ryan Driller, The Seduction of Heidi; Robby Echo, Hand Solo: A DP XXX Parody; Small Hands, A Trailer Park Taboo; Steve Holmes, Dirty Grandpa; Ryan McLane, Cursed; Derrick Pierce, Second First Date; Logan Pierce, Love in the Digital Age; Tommy Pistol, Anne: A Taboo Parody; Michael Vegas, How I Fucked Your Mother: A XXX Parody	

=== 2020s ===
Year	Photo	Winner	Film	Nominees	Ref(s)
2020 (37th)		Seth Gamble	Perspective	Danny D, Uninvited; Damon Dice, My Husband’s Boss: The Power Position; Tommy Gunn, What We Do for Money; Small Hands, Love Song; Keiran Lee, A Night of Reckoning; Ryan Mclane, Upon Further Reflection; Tyler Nixon, Honeymoon; Michael Vegas, Forbidden Affairs 10: My Fiancée’s Brother; Zac Wild, The Gentleman	
2021 (38th)		Seth Gamble	A Killer on the Loose	Nathan Bronson, My Sinful Valentine; Danny D, No Mercy for Mankind; Quinton James, The Seductress; Ryan Mclane, Pushing Boundaries; Tyler Nixon, Don't Say a Word; Derrick Pierce, Primary; Tommy Pistol, iLove; Michael Vegas, Out With a Bang; Chad White, Who's Your Daddy?	
2022 (39th)		Tommy Pistol	Under the Veil	Mick Blue, Tell Her; Dante Colle, Casey: A True Story; Xander Corvus, Survive the Night; Duke Daybreak, Ink Motel 3; Quinton James, Toxic; Seth Gamble, Gods & Sinners; Small Hands, Succubus; Scott Nails, Kill Code 87; Derrick Pierce, Primary Season 2	
2023 (40th)		Seth Gamble	Going Up	Mike Chapman, Introspection; Dante Colle, One Night in Los Angeles; Charles Dera, Duplicity; Lucky Fate, Grinders; Quinton James, Obsessed 2; Isiah Maxwell, I Love You; Ryan Mclane, The Hitman: Love Is Deadly; Tommy Pistol, The Voyeur 5; Nicky Rebel, Shoot Your Shot	
2024 (41st)		Tommy Pistol	Feed Me	Barrett Blade, Redemption; Dante Colle, The Wedding; Xander Corvus, Space Junk; Lucky Fate, Privilege; Seth Gamble, Reckless; Jonte, Ashford Manor; Isiah Maxwell, Sally Mae: The Revenge of the Twin Dragons; Ryan Mclane, Platonic; Derrick Pierce, Primary 3	
2025 (42nd)		Chad Alva	Alive	Robby Apples So Extra!; Nathan Bronson, Amuse Bouche; Danny D, Scandalous; Charles Dera, Iris; Seth Gamble, Birth; Alex Jones, Sweethearts; Ryan Mclane, Side Hustle; Scott Nails, Gold Diggers; Codey Steele, My Best Friend’s Girl 2	
2026 (43rd)		Tommy Pistol	Strip	Parker Ambrose Once Upon a Time in the Valley; Robby Apples, Her Secret; Xander Corvus, Mind Games; Oliver Davis, Simulation; Max Fills, The Secrets We Share; Seth Gamble, Breadcrumbs; Isiah Maxwell, Wanted; Ryan Mclane, Bucket List; Scott Nails, The Holdup	

== Superlatives ==
Superlative	Actor	Record
Actor(s) with most awards	Tommy Pistol	6
Actor with most consecutive wins	Seth Gamble (2019-21)	3
Oldest winner	Jamie Gillis	53
Youngest winner	Steven St. Croix	26
Winner of the most decades	Mike Horner (1980s, 1990s, 2000s)	3
Winner of the most decades	Tom Byron (1990s, 2000s, 2010s)	3

== Multiple winners ==
Wins	Actor	Years
6	Tommy Pistol	2014, 2016, 2018, 2022, 2024, 2026
5	Mike Horner	1987, 1993, 1994, 1996, 2002
5	Randy Spears	1991, 2000, 2004, 2006, 2007
5	Evan Stone	2001, 2004, 2006, 2007, 2009
4	Steven St. Croix	1995, 1998, 2013, 2015
4	Tom Byron	1992, 1998, 2008, 2011
4	Seth Gamble	2019, 2020, 2021, 2023
3	Buck Adams	1987, 1992, 1995
3	Eric Edwards	1985, 1986, 1991
2	Jon Dough	1996, 1997
2	Dale DaBone	2003, 2012
2	Brad Armstrong	2003, 2008
2	Robert Bullock	1988, 1989
2	James Bonn	1999, 2000
2	Jon Martin	1989, 1990

== See also ==
- AVN Award for Best Supporting Actor
- AVN Award for Male Performer of the Year
- AVN Award for Male Foreign Performer of the Year
- AVN Award for Best Actress
