= Dillon Day =

American pornographic actor (born 1970)

- Born: August 18, 1970 (age 55); Ohio, United States
- Height: 5 ft 9 in (1.75 m)

Dillon Day (born August 18, 1970, in Ohio, United States) is a pornographic actor and a director. Muscular and with a bad boy look, Dillon played alpha male characters such as jocks, cops, among others.

== Biography ==
Day was married to Dasha but is now married to fellow pornographic actress Victoria Rush. He initially pursued a career in Hollywood and appeared in Bio-Dome and the 1994 film Widow's Kiss. In 2002, his father decided to enter the adult film industry as well, making his debut in Sin City's Island Rain and using the stage name Poppa Wad.

== Awards and nominations ==
List of accolades received by Dillon Day
Awards and nominations
Award	Won	Nominated
AVN Awards	0	25
XRCO Awards	1	2
NightMoves Awards	1	0
- Total number of wins and nominations
Totals	2	27

Year	Ceremony	Result	Category	Work
2001	AVN Award	Nominated	Male Performer of the Year	—
2001	AVN Award	Nominated	Best Actor - Film	Watchers
2001	AVN Award	Nominated	Best Actor - Video	Dark Angels
2001	AVN Award	Nominated	Best Supporting Actor - Film	Adrenaline
2001	AVN Award	Nominated	Best Supporting Actor - Video	West Side
2001	AVN Award	Nominated	Best Couples Sex Scene - Video (with Lola)	Chica Boom 3
2001	AVN Award	Nominated	Best Couples Sex Scene - Video (with Midori)	West Side
2001	AVN Award	Nominated	Best Couples Sex Scene - Film (with Dasha)	Shakespeare Revealed
2001	NightMoves Award	Won	Best Actor/Male Performer (Editor's Choice)	—
2001	XRCO Award	Won	Best New Stud	—
2002	AVN Award	Nominated	Male Performer of the Year	—
2002	AVN Award	Nominated	Best Actor - Film	Underworld
2002	AVN Award	Nominated	Best Couples Sex Scene - Video (with TJ Hart)	Fast Cars & Tiki Bars
2003	AVN Award	Nominated	Male Performer of the Year	—
2003	AVN Award	Nominated	Best Actor – Film	Poison Angel
2003	AVN Award	Nominated	Best Anal Sex Scene - Video (with Jewels Jade)	Wildlife Anal Contest 2002
2003	AVN Award	Nominated	Best Sex Scene Coupling – Video (with Hannah Harper)	Role Models 2
2003	AVN Award	Nominated	Best Group Sex Scene – Film (with Dasha & Sharon Wild)	Take 5
2003	AVN Award	Nominated	Best Group Sex Scene – Film (with Dasha, Danny & Pat Myne)	Vision
2003	AVN Award	Nominated	Best Group Sex Scene – Video (with April, Violet Blue, Avy Scott & Randy Spears)	Heroin
2003	XRCO Award	Nominated	Best Group Scene (with April, Violet Blue, Avy Scott & Randy Spears)	Heroin
2004	AVN Award	Nominated	Best Actor – Video	Phoenix Rising 2
2004	AVN Award	Nominated	Best Supporting Actor – Film	Perfect
2004	AVN Award	Nominated	Best Group Sex Scene – Film (with Aurora Snow & John West)	Heaven
2006	AVN Award	Nominated	Male Foreign Performer of the Year	—
2006	AVN Award	Nominated	Best Actor – Video	Dark Angels 2: Bloodline
2006	AVN Award	Nominated	Best Sex Scene Coupling – Video (with Dasha)	Suck, Fuck, Swallow
2006	XRCO Award	Nominated	Best Single Performance - Actor	Dark Angels 2
2007	AVN Award	Nominated	Best POV Sex Scene (with Stacy Silver)	Chew on My Spew 3
