= Megan Leigh =

American pornographic actress and dancer (1964–1990)

- Born: Michelle Marie Schei; March 2, 1964; Castro Valley, California, U.S.
- Died: June 16, 1990 (aged 26); Solano County, California, U.S.
- Other names: Caroline Chambers; Heather Newman; Caitlyn Lewiss
- Occupations: Stripteaser; pornographic actress
- Years active: 1982–1990
- Height: 1.73 m (5 ft 8.11 in)

Megan Leigh (March 2, 1964 – June 16, 1990) was an American stripteaser and pornographic actress.

== Early life ==
Megan Leigh (née Michelle Marie Schei) was born in California. She ran away from home for the first time at age 14; by age 16, she was working at a massage parlor in Guam.

== Death ==
Leigh's body was discovered on June 16, 1990, at her home in Solano County, California. The 26-year-old had died of a self-inflicted gunshot wound to the head. She left behind a note alluding to long-running personal problems that she could no longer cope with.
