= Amber Lynn =

American pornographic actress

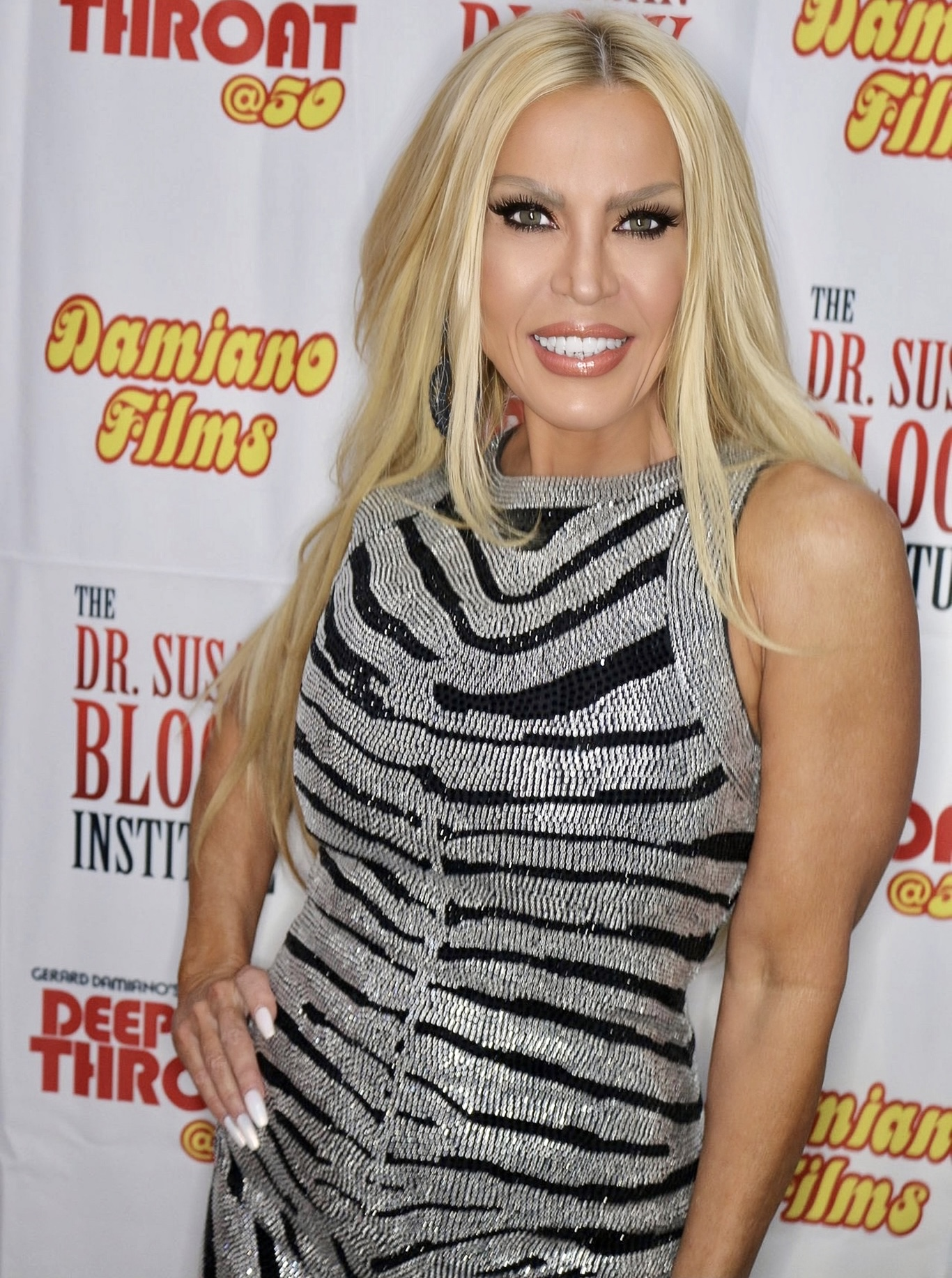
- Amber Lynn at the 50th anniversary screening of "Deep Throat".
- Born: Laura Lynn Allen; September 3, 1964 (age 62); Orange, California, United States
- Occupations: Pornographic film actress; mainstream actress; radio host; model; exotic dancer; advocate; humanitarian
- Height: 5 ft 7 in (1.70 m)
- Website: www.amberlynnxxx.com

Amber Lynn (born Laura Lynn Allen; September 3, 1964) is an American pornographic film actress and mainstream actress, radio host, model, exotic dancer, advocate and humanitarian.

== Early life ==
Amber Lynn was born Laura Lynn Allen on September 3, 1964, in Orange, California, the youngest daughter of a retired Air Force officer. She has four brothers and an older sister who died at the age of two from an undetected heart defect. One of her brothers was the late porn actor Buck Adams. When Lynn was three, her parents divorced after it was discovered her father had a family with another woman. Shortly after, Lynn's mother suffered a nervous breakdown, and Lynn was placed in foster care, where she was physically abused. She was reunited with her mother when she was seven. Shortly after, the two of them were involved in a car accident on the interstate; Lynn was thrown clear of the car and her mother died at the scene.

Lynn and her brothers were placed with her father and his new family; in total there were eight boys and Lynn in the house. When Lynn was eleven, her father died of alcoholism and heart failure. As a teenager, Lynn described her change as going from "pudgy, kind of buck-toothed" tomboy to having a "rockin' little body". She started doing fitness modeling, bikini modeling, and hot body contests. She eventually relocated to Hollywood and became a regular at the clubs on the Sunset Strip.

== Career ==
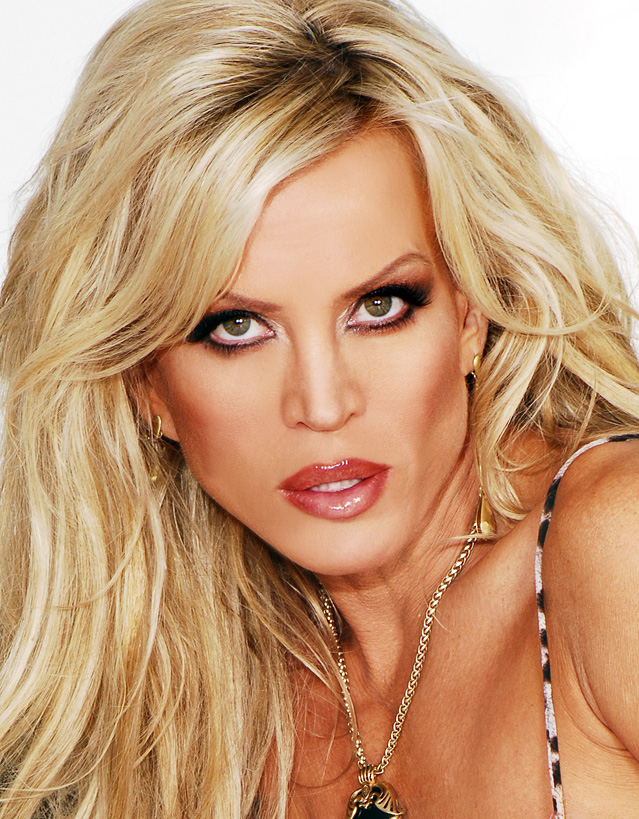
An undated photo (2008 or earlier) of Amber Lynn

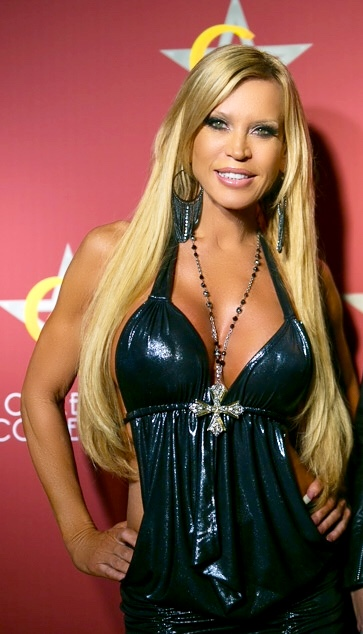
Lynn in 2014

Lynn was a bikini and figure model in Los Angeles in the early 1980s; following this she was featured in nude magazine photo spreads for Penthouse, Hustler, Chic, High Society and Club magazines. Lynn made the transition from nude modeling to pornographic films with an appearance in Bobby Hollander's 1983 feature Personal Touch 3 in a scene with Craig Roberts, and in the video "Vixens In Heat" release date December 1983, she was the first adult actress to use the surname "Lynn" as her professional screen name. In 1983, shortly after her photo spread appeared in Penthouse magazine, she went to an audition for a movie where the director was a well-known porn veteran. There, in an effort to calm her nervousness, the director offered Lynn a pipe with some freebase cocaine. It was her first encounter with the drug; she later described the feeling of being as "It's as if the birds are singing. The light is brighter. All of a sudden I'm no longer this gangly nervous teenager. I'm sitting there going 'Oh wow!'". She has been clean and sober since 2000 and works in the detox of addicts and alcoholics at times.

Lynn was the first female performer to open the door for adult film stars to be featured in dance touring, being recognized for this accomplishment throughout the United States and Canada. Lynn was the highest paid female performer on the strip club circuit, making $32,000 a week. Lynn was paid $20,000 to appear Sin City Entertainment's 1995 Baywatch Parody "Babewatch" 3 & 4, 10 times more than Pamela Anderson's own claim she only made $1,500 per day for NBC's Baywatch television series, Ms. Lynn's marketability was thus strong. IMDb

2026 Lynn continues her reoccurring role as the iconic Mother In Law,Jetta in the episodic series The Naughty Nanny. Lynn appears for The Hollywood Show for the second year in a row May 29-30 2026 . In July 2025 Xbiz media announces Lynn had just wrapped a guest starring appearance in the big budget remake of "The Naughty Nanny" based on the television series slated November release. On October 17-19 2025 Amber Lynn appeared at The Taboo Naughty and Nice Sex Show Expo in Toronto, Canada marking her first Canadian appearance in many years. Lynn has had roles in non-adult films such as Evils of the Night (1985) and 52 Pick-Up (1986), as well as the television program The Man Show. Lynn was referenced on the NBC television series Seinfeld in Season 3, Episode 10: The Stranded during a shot of the Show World Center's Marquee in Times Square, N.Y., and guest starred as herself in Lionsgate's Who's Jenna...? (2018). Most recently, she was featured as Michael Douglas' character's "Fantasy Lady" in The Kominsky Method (2019), and appeared in the documentary Larry Flynt for President (2021). She had a tribute mention in the final episode of HBO's The Deuce (2019) IMDb. For her 28th birthday in 1992, Lynn hosted a benefit birthday party at the Bel Age hotel in Beverly Hills. The benefit was in honor of The Youth AIDS Foundation of Los Angeles, an organization providing housing and assistance for helping runaways get off the streets and for teenagers with HIV, which was about to go under. An August 1992 issue of the Los Angeles Times quoted her statement on page two: "Let's give them food, clothing and shelter and we'll worry about role models later", alongside a shot of her dressed in a formal gown, holding an infant girl. This was a breakthrough moment for how the adult industry was viewed by the mainstream concerning its crossover involvement in children's organizations, as never before had a children's organization knowingly accepted support from the adult entertainment industry.

November 20, 2025 Lynn appears in a grand stage entrance as cohost with AVN CEO Tony Rios at 2026 AVN Awards Nominations at Avalon Nightclub in Hollywood, California.

Lynn has opposed the Los Angeles "Safer Sex in the Adult-Film Industry" initiative, which mandates that actors in adult films shot in Los Angeles County use condoms. She has been involved in the first charity to accept contributions from the adult film industry, Youth AIDS Foundation of Los Angeles, since 1992. She has served as the Sergeant at Arms for APAG Union The Adult Performance Actors Guild a federally recognized union serving artists, and talent in the industry since 2016. She also helps other charities such as Rock Against MS, ACLU, CHLA Children's Hospital Los Angeles, Childhood Cancer Awareness, The Southern California Toy Run and Janie's Fund, Steven Tyler's new organization.

Lynn hosts a weekly TV media podcast talk show called Rock'N'SeXXXy UnCensored on United Broadcasting Network, rock-n-sexxxy-uncensored.com, formerly LATalkRadio.com and Stitcher.com., she was interviewed on CBS – "Adult film performers say the state of mental health in the industry needs more attention[15]", December 2019. She is a member of the Adult Video News (AVN) Hall of Fame, and XRCO XRated Critics Organization Hall of Fame and was awarded a Lifetime Achievement Award from the Free Speech Coalition, and Hot d'Or – Lifetime Achievement Award at The Cannes Film Festival, France. She continues to perform as an adult actress, and in mainstream films and television appearances she is represented exclusively by Roger Paul Inc. Talent Agency New York IMDb.

Lynn has registered her professional name, Amber Lynn, as a trade mark, numbered 5040826.

== Personal life ==
Lynn met porn actor Jamie Gillis on the set of her second-ever pornographic film, and the two began a long-term relationship.

Lynn had her first experience with cocaine on a porn set very early in her career. She eventually became addicted to cocaine, a drug addiction that lasted for nearly two decades. She once said, "I started out drinking Ketel One and slicing off crystals of Peruvian rock. I wound up broken down, drinking Kamchatka vodka out of a half-pint stashed in the bottom of my purse, with my crack pipe stuffed in the lining of my jacket". She completed full rehabilitation and has been clean and sober since April 2000, and occasionally works as a personal recovery assistant, helping addicts to detox. She also works in mainstream acting roles, as a webcam model exclusively on Streamate one of the largest cam sites online, and as a real estate agent specializing in luxury homes.

Amber Lynn was one of a handful of female performers to work with fellow adult film star, John Holmes, (unknowingly) after he knew he'd been diagnosed with the HIV virus (see The Rise and Fall of The Roman Empire starring John Holmes, Amber Lynn and Ciccolina, shot on location in Rome, Italy). After testing, she was given a clean bill of health and continues to work in the adult industry.

== Notable TV guest appearances ==
- The Man Show – "Hypnotist" (episode 2.20) February 4, 2001
- Frontline – "Death of a Porn Queen", June 1987

== Awards ==
Amber Lynn attending industry award ceremonies

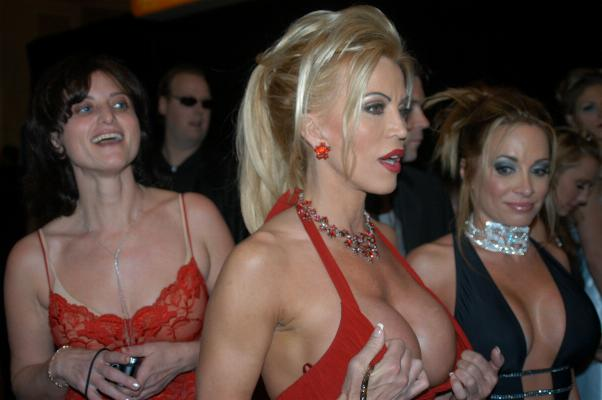
Lynn (center) at the 2005 AEE Awards

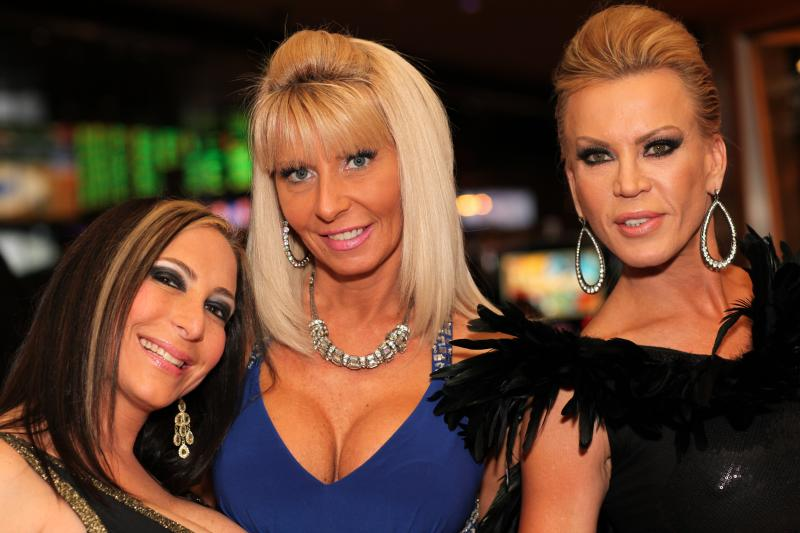
Lynn (right) at the 2013 AVN Awards with fellow porn actresses Savannah Jane (left) and Kasey Storm (middle)

- 1986 AVN Award – Best Couples Sex Scene - Film – Ten Little Maidens
- 1986 XRCO Award – Starlet of the Year
- 1986 XRCO Award – Orgasmic Oral Scene – Love Bites
- 1988 XRCO Award – Best Supporting Actress – Taboo 5
- 1993 Hot d'Or – Lifetime Achievement Award
- AVN Hall of Fame inductee
- 1996 XRCO Hall of Fame inductee
- 2003 Free Speech Coalition – Lifetime Achievement Award
- 2007 Adam Film World Guide – Lifetime Achievement Award
- 2018 Nollywood Film – Humanitarian Achievement Award
