= Jon Dough =

American pornographic actor (1962–2006)

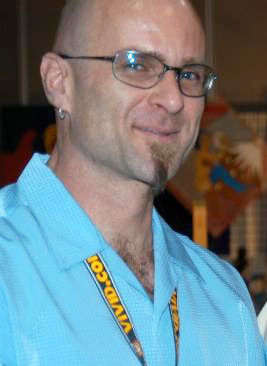
- Dough at the AVN Adult Entertainment Expo, January 2005
- Born: Chester Joseph Anuszak; November 12, 1962; Lancaster, Pennsylvania, U.S.
- Died: August 27, 2006 (aged 43); Chatsworth, California, U.S.
- Other names: Chuck Long, John Doe, Chad Sanders, Jan Sanders, Rock Taylor, Chet Sanders, Chet Anuszak, John Doc, Jon Doc, Sam Snatch, The Jester from Leicester
- Spouses: Deidre Holland (m. 1989–1994) Monique DeMoan (m. 1994)

Jon Dough (born Chester "Chet" Joseph Anuszak; November 12, 1962 – August 27, 2006) was an American pornographic actor active between 1985 and 2006.

== Early life ==
Dough was born Chester Joseph Anuszak and grew up in Lancaster, Pennsylvania. When he was eight years old, his mother's boyfriend began sexually abusing him and his younger brother. At age 15, Dough was sent to live with his uncle. At the age of 18, Dough enrolled at Albright College in Reading, Pennsylvania. Four years later, he graduated with a degree in biology.

== Career ==
Dough moved to Los Angeles, where he initially intended to seek work as a soap opera actor. However, a photoshoot with adult magazine Hustler quickly resulted in steady work in the adult industry.

His first film was a short loop he made for Lance Kinkaid in 1985. In 1999, Vivian Valentine received a black eye after being hit by Dough during the filming of Anabolic Video's Rough Sex; however, she has said: "I have no regrets or bad feelings about it".

Dough was a veteran of over 1,400 adult videos as a performer and 71 as a director, according to the IAFD. One of his most noteworthy achievements was participating in a gangbang with 101 women, as well as appearing in the first DVD produced by the porn publisher Hustler.

He appeared in an episode of Louis Theroux's Weird Weekends devoted to the San Fernando Valley's pornographic film industry, granting BBC Two presenter Louis Theroux several interviews on- and off-set.

== Personal life ==
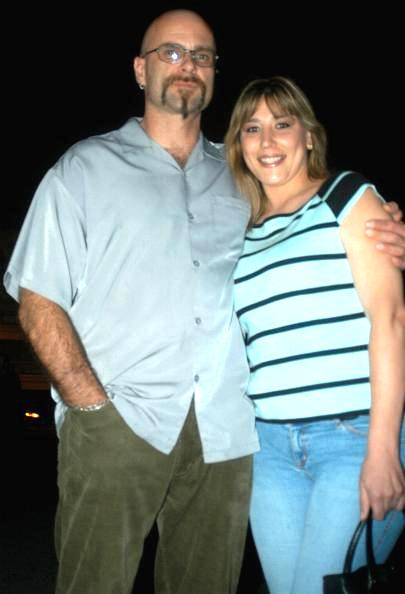
Dough with his second wife, Monique DeMoan

Dough's first marriage was to Deidre Holland, a pornographic actress, whom he later divorced. He married pornographic actress Monique DeMoan, with whom he had a daughter in August 2002.

== Death and aftermath ==
Dough died on August 27, 2006, in Chatsworth, California in a suicide by hanging. He was 43 years old. DeMoan discovered Dough's body hanging inside a closet of their home. Dough had survived another suicide attempt a month prior when he was rushed to the hospital and saved. DeMoan subsequently retired from the porn industry. In a 2012 interview with Louis Theroux, she cited Dough's ongoing struggles with drugs and alcohol and growing disillusionment with a porn industry decimated by internet sites as a catalyst for his worsening depression and eventual suicide.

On the day Dough died, DeMoan was napping while Dough was in the living room and their daughter was next door visiting a friend. Upon waking up, DeMoan left the house for a short time to buy drugs, and became concerned when Dough could still not be found after she returned home. She soon began calling friends and searching the neighborhood. After two hours of searching, she found his body in a dark walk-in closet in their home. While Dough was someone who typically kept his thoughts to himself, DeMoan says he did begin mentioning suicide in the weeks before his death.

In the aftermath of Dough's death, DeMoan lamented that he had been "a hunk of a man – he's got everything going for him. Nothing seems to faze him," but drug and alcohol abuse eventually got the best of him. She said that even at the height of his struggles, he was always a dedicated father to his young daughter.

Dough was best friends with fellow adult performer Randy Spears, who were next-door neighbours at one point. According to Spears, "We surfed together, rode motorcycles together, cooked out together, drank beer together, fooled around in our garages. We borrowed money from each other. We laughed, we cried. We talked each other into joy, and we talked each other down from emotional fences. I can't believe he's gone." Spears has described Dough as being "like a brother" to him. Following Dough's death, he set up a memorial fund on MySpace to raise funds for the funeral costs.

== Awards ==
- 1991 XRCO Award – Best Actor (Brandy & Alexander)
- 1992 AVN Award – Best Supporting Actor, Film (Brandy & Alexander)
- 1993 XRCO Award – Best Actor, Single Performance (New Wave Hookers 3)
- 1994 XRCO Award – Male Performer of the Year
- 1995 AVN Award – Male Performer of the Year
- 1995 AVN Award – Best Supporting Actor, Film (Sex)
- 1995 XRCO Award – Best Actor, Single Performance (Latex)
- 1996 AVN Award – Best Actor, Video (Latex)
- 1997 AVN Award – Best Actor, Video (Shock)
- AVN Hall of Fame inductee
- XRCO Hall of Fame inductee
