= The Masseuse =

1990 pornographic film

The Masseuse is a pornographic film made in 1990 and starring Randy Spears and Hyapatia Lee.

== Sequels and remakes ==
A sequel, Masseuse 2 was released in 1994 and also won awards.

Another sequel, Masseuse 3 was released in 1998 and also won awards including two at the 16th AVN Awards: Best Supporting Actress—Film for Chloe and Best Group Sex Scene—Film for Taylor Hayes, Mr. Marcus and Billy Glide.

The original movie was remade with the same plot in 2004 by Vivid Entertainment with Jenna Jameson and Justin Sterling in the starring roles. Both films were directed by Paul Thomas.

== Awards ==
- 1991 AVN Awards - Best Actor (Randy Spears), Best Actress (Hyapatia Lee) & Best Screenplay - Film.
- 2004 XRCO Award - Best Film
- 2005 AVN Award - Best Film
- 2006 AVN Award - Top Renting Release of the Year
