= Sharon Kane =

American bondage model and pornographic film actress

- Occupations: Bondage model; pornographic film actress

Sharon Kane is an American former bondage model and pornographic film actress. She has appeared in many adult magazines and pornographic films, in both dominant and submissive roles.

After leaving her home state of Ohio to move to San Francisco, she began working at porn director Alex De Renzy's theater before making her feature film debut in his film Pretty Peaches (1978).

She is a member of both the AVN and XRCO Halls of Fame.

Recently, Kane works behind the camera as a director, production manager, art director and film composer. She wrote the scores for 1997's The Hills Have Bi's and Chi Chi La Rue's Idol in the Sky. She directed and starred in Stairway to Paradise, the movie featured in the book Coming Attractions: The Making of an X-Rated Movie. After retiring as a performer, for a time she worked as a production assistant for Naughty America's gay site Suite 703.

== Awards ==
AVN

- Hall of Fame Inductee
- 1990 Best Actress – Video for Bodies in Heat – The Sequel
- 1990 Best Couples Sex Scene – Film for Firestorm 3

Free Speech Coalition

- 1989 Lifetime Achievement Award

GayVN

- 2010 Trailblazer Award

XRCO

- Hall of Fame Inductee
- 1985 Best Supporting Actress for Throat: 12 Years After
- 1990 Best Actress for Bodies in Heat – The Sequel
