= Scotty Fox (director) =

- Occupation: Pornographic film director
- Notable work: The Cockateer

Scott Fox is a pornographic film director who is a member of the AVN Hall of Fame.

== Awards ==
- 1992 AVN Award – Best Director, Video (The Cockateer)
- 1995 AVN Hall of Fame inductee
