= Pretty Peaches =

1978 film by Alex de Renzy

- Theatrical release poster
- Directed by: Alex de Renzy
- Starring: Desireé Cousteau; John Leslie; Paul Thomas; Juliet Anderson
- Production company: Blu-Pix
- Release date: November 23, 1978 (USA)
- Running time: 91 minutes
- Country: United States
- Language: English

Pretty Peaches is a 1978 American pornographic comedy film directed by Alex de Renzy and released during the Golden Age of Porn. The film stars Desireé Cousteau as Peaches, described as "a daffy carefree female who cheerfully plunges through life without any worries." In the film, she has a car accident after attending the wedding of her father (John Leslie) and is rendered unconscious. She is found by two men who take advantage of her, before offering to help her when it becomes apparent that she has amnesia.

Pretty Peaches was likely influenced by Terry Southern and Mason Hoffenberg's Candy, itself often perceived as a homage to Voltaire's Candide.

While the film features sexual violence, including lesbian rape and a forced enema in a public rest-room – a sequence that was excised from most video releases – the film's tongue-in-cheek attitude keeps it up-beat. The Astronics/Telecine, Ltd. VHS release of the film is un-cut with the forced enema scene intact. Cousteau received the Adult Film Association of America Best Actress award in 1978 for her performance in the movie.

The success of the film spawned two sequels, both directed by de Renzy: Pretty Peaches 2 (1988) and Pretty Peaches and the Quest (1991) with Siobhan Hunter and Keisha in the title role of the 1988 and 1991 films, respectively.
