= Ona Zee =

American pornographic actress

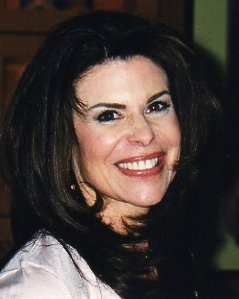
- Zee in 2000
- Born: Los Angeles, California, U.S.
- Occupations: Pornographic actress; director; producer
- Spouse: Frank Zee (divorced)

Ona Zee is an American pornographic actress, director, and producer of pornographic films.

== Career ==
Zee starred or appeared in over 300 adult movies since entering the industry in 1986. She was about 35 years old when she began, an age when many adult performers have already retired.

For 67 videos she served as director, writer, and producer. In 1990, she formed her own production company, Ona Zee Pictures. The company initially focused on bondage titles, but later moved on to other genres as well, such as feature and girl-girl movies.

During the 1990s, she formed a pornographic performers' union, but it ultimately collapsed due to lack of political and legal support.

== Awards ==
- 1989 AVN Award – Best Actress (film) (Portrait of an Affair)
- 1992 AVN Award – Best Actress, video (Starlet)
- 1993 AVN Award – Best Supporting Actress (film) (Secret Garden 1 and 2)
- 2000 Hot d'Or – Hot d'Or d'Honneur
- AVN Hall of Fame

== Personal life ==
Zee was born in Los Angeles, California. According to the TV series HBO Real Sex, Ona Zee was the spouse of Frank Zee, a Vietnam-era combat jet pilot. They were still married by the 1990s.
