= Randy West (actor) =

American pornographic actor (1947–2024)

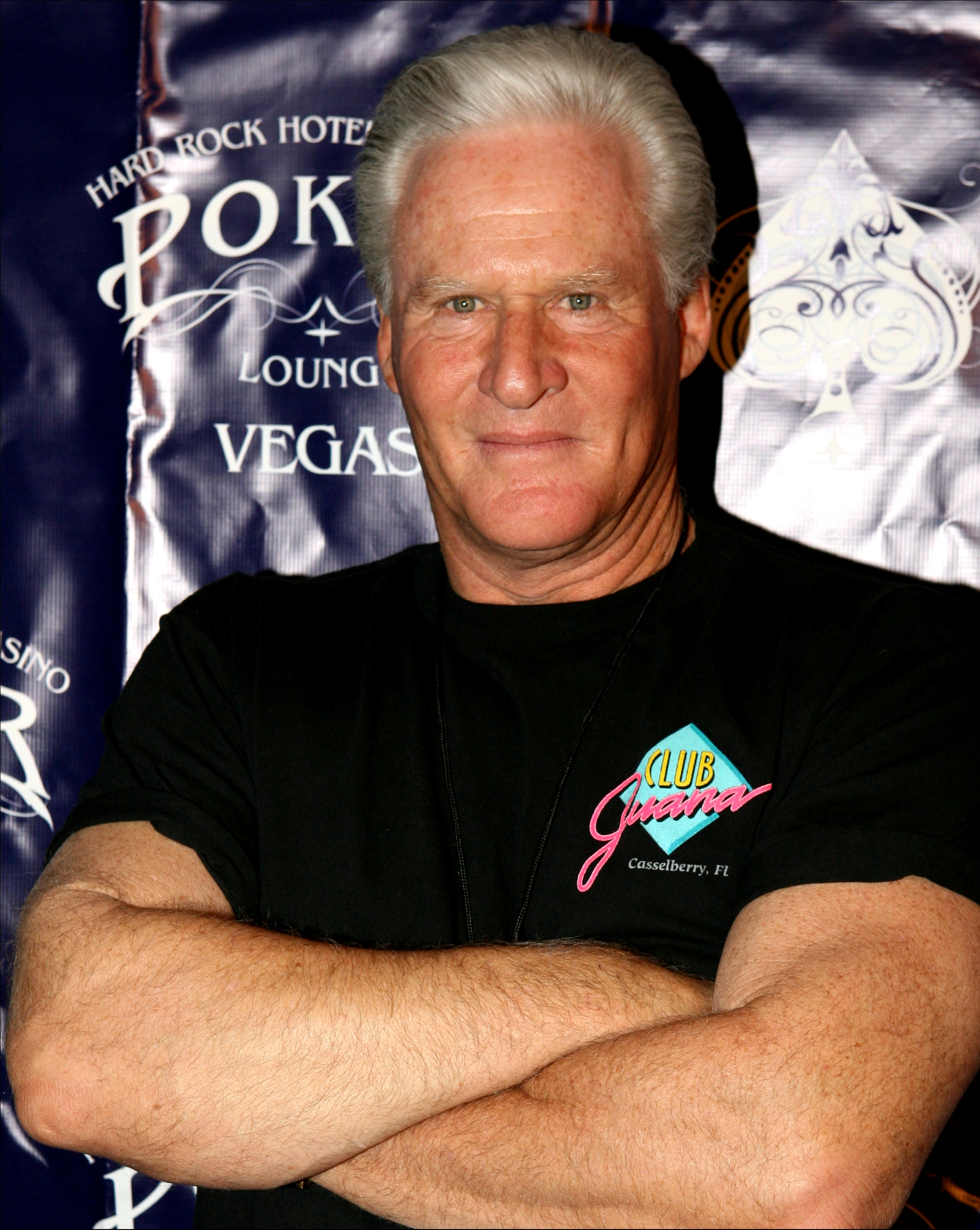
- West in 2009
- Born: Andrew Jay Abrams; October 12, 1947; New York City, New York, U.S.
- Died: September 20, 2024 (aged 76); Las Vegas, Nevada, U.S.
- Other names: Andy Deer, Johny West, Randy Abrams
- Occupation: pornographic actor
- Height: 1.83 m (6 ft 0 in)
- Website: http://www.randywest.com/

Andrew Jay Abrams (October 12, 1947 – September 20, 2024), known professionally as Randy West, was an American pornographic actor.

== Early life and pre-porn career ==
West grew up in New York City and moved to South Florida in the late 1960s. He originally aspired to play professional baseball and attended the University of Miami on a baseball scholarship. He then changed directions and decided to pursue a career in music, performing in several unsuccessful rock bands over the next decade. West also worked as a nude art model during this period. He then moved to California in 1979 and became a Chippendales dancer, stripping for private events between 1980 and 1992.

== Acting career ==
West first appeared in a non-sexual role in Emanuelle Around the World in 1977. A year later, he appeared in the pornography film Mystique while still living in Florida. In August 1980, he garnered attention when he became the first model to appear in the centerfold of Playgirl magazine with an erection. Later in his career he was cast as Robert Redford's body double in the 1993 Paramount Pictures film Indecent Proposal. He performed with numerous porn actresses early on in their careers, including Seka, Jenna Jameson, and Tera Patrick. For this reason, West was given credit for bringing future superstars Jameson and Patrick into the adult business. Additionally, he was the first male performer to work with future stars Victoria Paris and Ashlyn Gere.

West's on-screen sexual performance has been referred to by observers as being like that of a "human pile driver". He has appeared as a performer in over 1,300 pornographic films, alongside an estimated 2,500 female co-stars.

West appeared in the 2012 documentary film After Porn Ends, in which his life after retiring as a porn performer is discussed.

== Producer ==
West became involved in the more lucrative production side of the porn industry in 1993, as producer of adult films such as the Up and Cummers series which showcased new performers. With this and other series like I Love Lesbians, Real Female Masturbation and others, West's videos focused on "Real people having real sex – what a novel idea!" In one final video he stated that one of his greatest pleasures was watching his female partners have orgasms. Episodes had a fairly standard format: A short interview with the female performer to establish some background facts. Whether these were somewhat fictionalized or not, the chat established the young lady as an individual. Then came a succession of sex acts, each with the female performer an avid participant, including in almost every case, her orgasm. Randy filmed Jenna Jameson's first ever scenes for Up and Cummers 10 and 11. All of West's productions are distributed by Evil Angel. He was the CEO of Randy West Productions.

== Personal life ==
West's father and grandfather died from heart attacks. He suffered a heart attack on June 2, 2009, while working out in the gym, and underwent emergency surgery to correct an occlusion in the anterior interventricular branch of his left coronary artery, commonly known as the widowmaker. He received a good prognosis for recovery.

West never married or fathered children, which he blamed on his career for making it hard for him to form "normal relationships." As of 2011, West was living in Las Vegas. He said he retired from the industry due to no longer wanting to live in Southern California, the base of the U.S. adult film sector. As of 2013, he spent his time competing in celebrity golf tournaments for charity.

West died from heart and kidney failure in Las Vegas on September 20, 2024, at the age of 76.

== Awards ==
- 1993 – Lifetime Achievement Award from the Free Speech Coalition
- FOXE Award for Fan Favourite (Male) in '94, '95, '96 and '97
- XRCO 1994 – Best Pro-Am Series, Up and Cummers
- XRCO 1995 – Best Pro-Am Series, Up and Cummers
- AVN 1995 – Best Pro-Am Tape, Up and Cummers 7
- AVN 1997 – Best Pro-Am Tape, Up and Cummers 33
- AVN 1999 – Best Ethnic-Themed Series, Up and Cummers
- AVN 1999 – Best Pro-Am or Amateur Series, Up and Cummers
- AVN 2001 – Best Pro-Am or Amateur Series, Up and Cummers
- AVN 2002 – Best Pro-Am or Amateur Series, Up and Cummers
- AVN 2008 – Silverback of the Porn Industry, "He eats first"
- Listed at number 29 on the "List of Top 50 Porn Stars of All Time" by Adult Video News.
- Member of the AVN, FOXE and XRCO Halls of Fame
- Nominated in the AVN 'Best Actor' category 15 times
