= Paul Thomas (director) =

American film director (1949–2025)

- Born: Philip Charles Toubus; April 17, 1949; Winnetka, Illinois, U.S.
- Died: June 10, 2025 (aged 76)
- Other names: Phil Toubes, Phil Tobias, Phil Tobus, Phil Thomas, Paul Tanner, Paul Thobias, Judy Blue, Cleo Edwards, Cloe Edwards, Bo Edwards
- Occupations: Pornographic film actor and director 650 as actor 374 as director (per IAFD)

Philip Charles Toubus (April 17, 1949 – June 10, 2025), known professionally as Paul Thomas, was an American pornographic film actor and director. He was a member of the AVN Hall of Fame and the XRCO Hall of Fame.

== Life and career ==
Thomas was born in Winnetka, Illinois, to an upper-middle-class family in 1949. His father was of Greek-Jewish descent and his mother of Russian-Jewish descent. His family moved to the nearby Village of Glencoe, Illinois where he attended Glencoe's Central School, played on the school's basketball team and graduated 8th grade in 1963. He then attended New Trier Township High School and graduated in 1967.

Although he claimed to have attended the University of Wisconsin at Madison on a basketball scholarship and studied political science, he turned to acting as a career. He was the nephew of businesswoman Sara Lee Lubin.

He began his acting career in the play Hair in both Chicago and New York. Then he appeared in the stage version of Jesus Christ Superstar on Broadway and in a touring production, where he played all the male roles except Peter. After completing the touring production, Norman Jewison cast him as Peter in his film version of Jesus Christ Superstar. He also performed in the long-running play Beach Blanket Babylon in San Francisco.

He signed with the William Morris Agency and went to Hollywood, where he appeared in a few television shows. At this point, he appeared ready to start a career in mainstream television and movie work, but instead he turned to the career for which he would become more famous.

Thomas started working in pornography in 1974. He met the porn producers the Mitchell Brothers while playing in a musical in San Francisco. He performed in several porn loops for them and, in 1976, appeared in his first porn feature, The Autobiography of a Flea.

Thomas performed mostly using the stage name "Paul Thomas", but he also appeared under several other names. In 1982, Thomas was arrested for smuggling cocaine into the United States from South America. Convicted, he served one year in jail. Following his release from prison, Thomas resumed his career and, in 1983, won the Adult Film Association of America Award for Best Actor in Virginia. He had a starring role in the 1985 film series Taboo American Style.

Thomas started directing porn films in 1985, and directed for Vivid Entertainment from 1986. As of 2007, Thomas acted in over 500 films and directed nearly 300 films, winning seven Adult Video News Awards and two X-Rated Critics Organization Awards for best director. He was inducted into the X-Rated Critics Organization Hall of Fame in 1986.

Thomas was a member of the Adult Video News Hall of Fame. He was a personal friend of Jennifer Ketcham, who recounts Thomas' directing style as relying heavily on aesthetics with "one-hundred-page scripts" and "deftly placed lighting" in order to create shadow effects on his performers' bodies. She also stated that Thomas would require more acting from his performers than many other directors in the industry. He died on June 10, 2025, at the age of 76.

== Partial filmography ==
=== As actor ===
- Jesus Christ Superstar (1973)
- The Autobiography of a Flea (1976)
- Babyface (1977)
- Candy Stripers (1978)
- Pretty Peaches (1978)
- Dracula Sucks (1978)
- The Ecstasy Girls (1979)
- Virginia (1983)
- Private Teacher (1983)
- Taboo American Style 1: The Ruthless Beginning (1985)
- It's My Body (1985)
- Backside to the Future (1986)
- Debbie Does Dallas Again (2007)

=== As director ===
- Justine (1984)
- Beauty and the Beast (1988)
- Beauty and the Beast: Part II (1990)
- Passages 1–4 (1991)
- Twisted (1991)
- Borderline (1995)
- Bad Wives (1997)
- Bobby Sox (1997)
- Fade to Black (2002)
- Heart of Darkness (2004)
- Key Party (2005)
- The Masseuse (2005)
- The New Devil in Miss Jones (2005)

== Awards ==
- 1983 AFAA Award for Best Actor – Virginia
- 1991 AVN Award for Best Director – Video – Beauty & the Beast 2
- 1992 AVN Award – Reuben Sturman Memorial Award For Loyalty to the Adult Film Genre
- 1993 XRCO Award for Best Director
- 1994 AVN Award for Best Director, Film – Justine
- 1997 AVN Award for Best Director, Film – Bobby Sox
- 1999 XRCO Award for Best Director
- 2002 AVN Award for Best Non-Sex Performance – Fade to Black
- 2002 AVN Award for Best Director, Film – Fade to Black
- 2004 AVN Award for Best Director, Film – Heart of Darkness
- 2005 AVN Award for Best Director, Film – The Masseuse
- 2006 AVN Award for Best Director, Film – The New Devil in Miss Jones
- 2008 AVN Award for Best Director, Film – Layout
- 2008 XBIZ Award – Outstanding Achievement in Movie Production
- 2013 XBIZ Award Nomination – 'Director of the Year – Feature Release' for Friends With Benefits
- Porn Block of Fame

== Literature ==
- Nicolas Barbano: Verdens 25 hotteste pornostjerner (Rosinante, Denmark 1999); ISBN 87-7357-961-0: Features a chapter on him.
