= Buck Adams =

American pornographic actor (1955–2008)

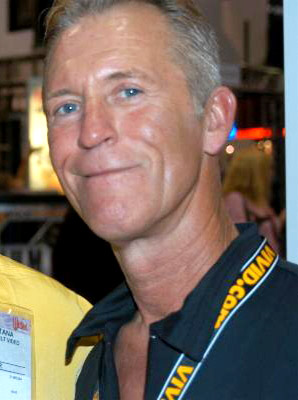
- Buck Adams in 2007
- Born: Charles Stephen Allen; November 15, 1955; United States
- Died: October 28, 2008 (aged 52); Northridge, California, U.S.
- Other names: Chuck Majors, Buick Adams, D.A. Adams, Claymore Rush, Brick Adams
- Height: 1.80 m (5 ft 11 in)
- Relatives: Amber Lynn

Buck Adams (born Charles Stephen Allen; November 11, 1955 – October 28, 2008) was an American pornographic film actor and director.

== Career ==
Adams was a boxer and bouncer before entering the pornographic film industry in the early 1980s, shortly after his sister Amber Lynn began her adult film career. He made his directorial debut with the 1988 movie Squirt. He performed in over 700 movies and directed about 80.

== Death ==
Adams died on October 28, 2008, due to complications from heart failure. He died at Northridge Hospital Medical Center, Los Angeles, with his daughter Christa, his sister Amber Lynn, and his close friend Harold Jenkins at his side. Adams had survived several heart attacks during the 1990s. Just before his death, he built a studio where he intended to produce Internet videos.

== Awards ==
- 1987 AVN Award – Best Actor (Video) – Rockey X
- 1990 XRCO Award – Best Sex Scene – The Chameleon (with Tori Welles)
- 1992 AVN Award – Best Actor (Film) – Roxy
- 1995 AVN Award – Best Actor (Film) – No Motive
- 1995 XRCO Hall of Fame inductee
- AVN Hall of Fame inductee
- 2003 Free Speech Coalition – Lifetime Achievement Award
