= Joey Silvera =

American pornographic actor and director (born 1951)

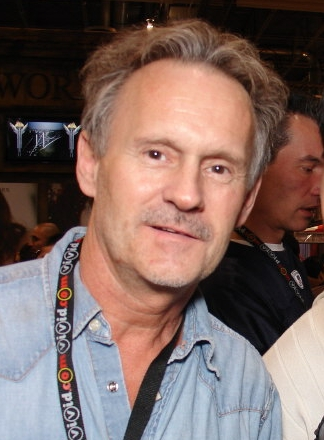
- Silvera in 2007
- Born: December 20, 1951 (age 74); New York City, New York, U.S.
- Other names: Joey Siverno, Joey N., Joey Sivera, Joey Severa, Joey Civera, Joey Cevera, Joey Savera, Joey Long, Joe Masseria, Joseph Nassi, Eric Marin, Joey Short, Joe Arnold, Joe Skeg, John Smith
- Occupations: Pornographic actor, director
- Height: 6 ft 2 in (1.88 m)
- Website: www.joeysilvera.com

Joey Silvera (born December 20, 1951) is an American pornographic film director and former actor.

He has been involved in the pornographic industry since the early 1970s. A native of upstate New York, he first started performing in San Francisco in 1974, and went on to appear in more than 1,000 films and videos. In the early 1990s, Silvera went on to direct videos for his own company. His movies were first distributed by Devil's Film, and he later was invited to join John Stagliano's Evil Angel.

== Career ==
He is a member of the AVN and XRCO Halls of Fame.

== Awards ==
As a performer:

- 1984 XRCO Best Supporting Actor for Public Affairs
- 1985 XRCO Best Supporting Actor for She's So Fine
- 1987 AVN Best Supporting Actor – Video for She's So Fine
- 1987 AVN Best Couples Sex Scene – Video for Blame it on Ginger
- 1988 AVN Best Couples Sex Scene – Video for Made in Germany
- 1993 AVN Best Supporting Actor – Film for Facedance 1 and 2
- 1993 AVN Best Actor – Video for The Party
- 1993 AVN Best Couples Sex Scene – Video for The Party
- 1994 XRCO Best Group Scene for Buttman's British Moderately Bit Tit Adventure

As a director:

- 1996 XRCO Best Series for Joey Silvera's Butt Row
- 1997 AVN Best Gonzo Series for Butt Row
- 1999 AVN Best Transsexual Release for The Big-Ass She-Male Adventure
- 1999 XRCO Best Gonzo Series for Please!
- 2000 AVN Best Transsexual Release for Rogue Adventures 3: Big-Ass She-Male Adventure
- 2000 XRCO Best Gonzo Series for Please!
- 2001 AVN Best Gonzo Release for Please! 12
- 2001 AVN Best Gonzo Series for Please!
- 2001 AVN Best Transsexual Release for Rogue Adventures 3: Big-Ass She-Male Adventure 7
- 2001 XRCO Best Gonzo Series for Service Animals
- 2002 AVN Best Transsexual Release for Rogue Adventures 13
- 2003 AVN Best Transsexual Release for Rogue Adventures 15
- 2004 AVN Best Gonzo Release for Service Animals
- 2004 XRCO Best Gonzo Series for Service Animals
- 2005 XRCO Best Gonzo Series for Service Animals
- 2006 AVN Best Transsexual Release for Rogue Adventures 24
- 2006 XRCO Best Gonzo Series for Service Animals
- 2007 AVN Best Transsexual Release for Rogue Adventures 27
- 2012 XBIZ Award – Transsexual Release of the Year for She-Male Police 2
- 2012 XBIZ Award – Transsexual Director of the Year
- 2014 XBIZ Award – Transsexual Director of the Year
- 2015 XBIZ Award – Transsexual Release of the Year for Big Tit She-Male X 2
- 2015 XBIZ Award – Transsexual Director of the Year
