= AVN (magazine) =

American magazine covering adult entertainment

Adult Video News

- Cover of the March 2012 issue
- Categories: Trade magazine
- Frequency: Monthly
- Publisher: Tony Rios
- Total circulation: 40,000 (2006)
- Founded: 1983; 43 years ago
- Country: United States
- Based in: Chatsworth, California, U.S.
- Language: English
- ISSN: 0883-7090

Adult Video News (also called AVN or AVN Magazine) is an American trade magazine that covers the adult video industry. The New York Times notes that AVN is to pornographic films what Billboard is to records. AVN sponsors an annual convention, called the Adult Entertainment Expo or AEE, in Las Vegas, Nevada, along with the AVN Awards, an award show for the adult industry modeled after the Academy Awards.

AVN rates adult films and tracks news developments in the industry. An AVN issue can feature over 500 movie reviews. The magazine is about 80% ads and is targeted at adult-video retailers. Author David Foster Wallace has described AVN articles to be more like infomercials than articles, but he also described the AVN magazine as "sort of the Variety of the US porn industry."

== History ==
Paul Fishbein, Irv Slifkin, and Barry Rosenblatt founded AVN in 1983 in Philadelphia, Pennsylvania. Slifkin left in 1984; having lost interest in reviewing adult movies due to the industry's transition from film to videos. Rosenblatt and Fishbein had a falling out in 1987. Eventually, Fishbein moved the magazine to the San Fernando Valley where it operates to this day. Fishbein sold the company in 2010. Theo Sapoutzis became chairman and CEO of AVN. Tony Rios became owner and CEO of AVN in August 2015.

AVN is widely quoted for various figures about the adult industry and its revenues. AVN estimated that the sales and rentals of adult videos topped four billion dollars in 2000 and 2002. Forbes has called this figure "baseless and wildly inflated". When Forbes asked AVN how it arrived at this figure, Mike Ramone the managing editor at the time responded, "I don't know the exact methodology ... It's a pie chart." When asked to separate the figures for sales versus rentals, a standard practice among those who cover the video industry, the editor did not think those figures were available. Adams Media Research noted that no one tracked the adult video business with rigor or precision and that the most generous estimate of sales and rentals combined was $1.8 billion. AVN estimated that adult industry revenue in 2005 was $12.6 billion with $2.5 billion of that coming from the Internet. However, ABC News reported that this figure could not be independently verified. According to Michael Goodman of the Yankee Group, it is difficult to estimate for an industry where few companies are public and new providers continually appear. By 2018, Dan Miller, AVN's managing editor said, "The safe estimate is to say it's worth billions, but I don't know exactly how many billion, and no one does."

=== Notable alumni ===
- Eli Cross (as Mark Logan): former managing editor
- Anthony Lovett: publisher and editor-in-chief (2005–2010).

== Adult Entertainment Expo ==
AVN sponsors an annual convention, the AVN Adult Entertainment Expo (AEE), held each January in Las Vegas.

== Award Shows ==
=== AVN Awards ===
AVN also an award show for the adult industry modeled after the Oscars. The awards feature over 100 categories and has an attendance of over 3500 people. David Foster Wallace skeptically noted that AVN, in 1997, reviewed over 4,000 new releases in every category in comparison to the 375 films that the Academy Awards were required to see for the Oscars. This number increased to 8,000 for the 2008 Awards and Paul Fishbein comments that it is "a very long, horrible process". The New York Times noted that the "precise criteria for winning an AVN are not, well, explicit". Awards often go to consistent advertisers in AVN.

Sports columnist Bill Simmons commented that the Awards were "the most secretly captivating telecasts on TV" alongside the National Spelling Bee and Westminster Kennel Club Dog Show. Violet Blue, the sex writer, describes the Awards as "big backslapping event where the same companies and same names win year after year... To think of the 'porn Oscars' as a true representation of porn's very best is like having sex with a Jenna Jameson love doll and telling your friends you had sex with the porn star". Even Tyla Winn, an award winner, had trouble remembering one of her sex scenes that was nominated.

=== GayVN Awards ===
AVN also sponsors the GayVN Awards which are presented annually to honor work done in the gay pornography industry. Awards for gay adult video were a part of the AVN awards from 1988 to 1998. In 1999, AVN decided to separately host the GayVN Awards.

== See also ==
- AVN Adult Entertainment Expo
- AVN Awards
- XBIZ
