= 12th AVN Awards =

US adult industry award ceremony in 1995

- The 12th Annual AVN Awards Show VHS box cover
- Date: January 7, 1995
- Site: Bally's Hotel and Casino, Paradise, Nevada
- Hosted by: Steven St. Croix; Dyanna Lauren; Tera Heart
- Produced by: Gary Miller
- Directed by: Mark Stone

Highlights
- Best Picture: Sex (Best Film)
- Most awards: Sex (9)
- Most nominations: Dog Walker (14); Sex (14, tie)

The 12th AVN Awards ceremony, organized by Adult Video News (AVN) took place on January 7, 1995, at Bally's Hotel and Casino, Paradise, Nevada beginning at 7:45 p.m. PST / 10:45 p.m. EST. During the ceremony, AVN presented AVN Awards (commonly referred to as the Oscars of porn) in 89 categories honoring the movies released during the period December 1, 1993 to November 30, 1994. The ceremony was produced by Gary Miller, Mark Stone and Marco Polo. Actor Steven St. Croix hosted the show for the first time, with co-hosts Dyanna Lauren and Tera Heart.

Michael Ninn's Sex won nine awards, including Best Film. Other winners included Dog Walker and Shame with five each. Flashpoint and Idol Country were the top gay movies with four trophies apiece.

== Winners and nominees ==
The nominees for the 12th AVN Awards were announced at the AVN nominations luncheon 30 days prior to the awards ceremony. Dog Walker and Michael Ninn's Sex earned the most nominations with fourteen. They were the most nominated movies since the awards began in 1984. Shame, an avant-garde western, earned ten nominations while Body & Soul and The Dinner Party had nine apiece.

The winners were announced during the awards ceremony on January 7, 1995. John Leslie won best director in both the film and the video categories, the first time that had happened. He joined previous winners Cecil Howard and Henri Pachard as the only people to have won three best director awards. Ashlyn Gere won Best Actress in both the film and the video categories, just as she had done two years earlier. Asia Carrera became the first person to win the AVN Award for Female Performer of the Year in her first year in the industry. Kylie Ireland was crowned Starlet of the Year.

=== Major awards ===
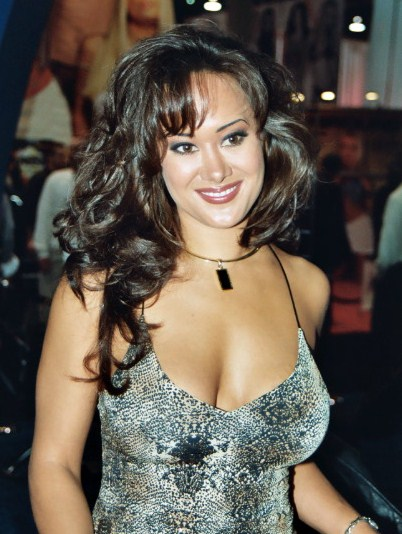
Asia Carrera, Female Performer of the Year winner

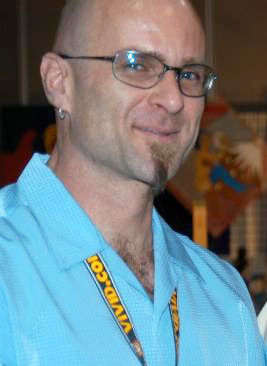
Jon Dough, Male Performer of the Year winner

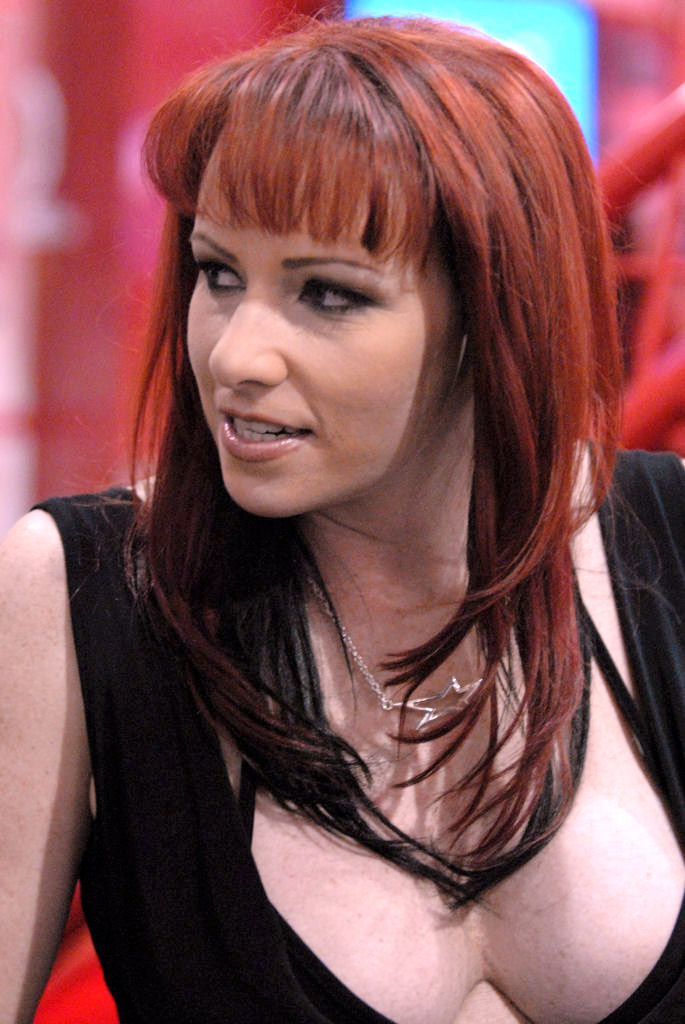
Kylie Ireland, Best New Starlet winner

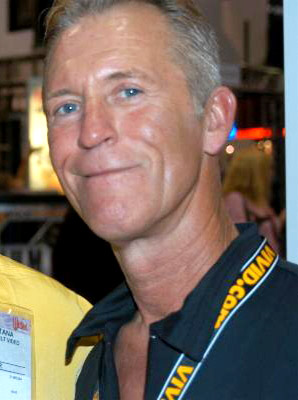
Buck Adams, Best Actor—Film winner

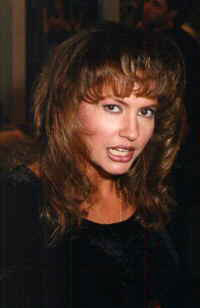
Ashlyn Gere, Best Actress—Film winner

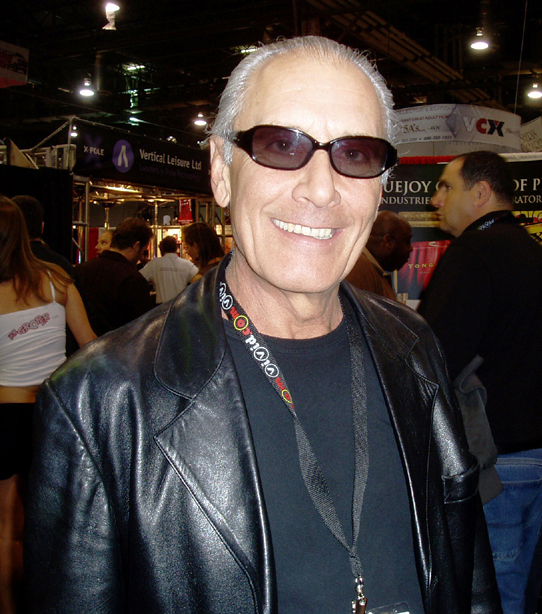
John Leslie, Best Director—Film, Best Director—Video and Best Screenplay winner

Winners are listed first, highlighted in boldface, and indicated with a double dagger (‡).

Best Film	Best Shot-on-Video Feature
**Sex**‡; Bonny & Clyde 3 & 4; Climax 2000; Dog Walker; Erotika; Hustlers; Masseuse 2; No Motive; Steamy Windows; The Swap, Part 2; Up and Cummers the Movie; Who Killed Holly Hollywood?	**Shame**‡; Babewatch; Bad Girls 1 & 2; Bad Habits; Body and Soul; Blondage; The Face; Flesh for Fantasy; Jailhouse Cock; Pleasure Dome; R&R; Tommyknockers; Western Nights
Female Performer of the Year
**Asia Carrera**‡; Tammi Ann; Kaitlyn Ashley; Misty Rain; Shane; Ashlyn Gere; Sarah Jane Hamilton; Kylie Ireland; Leena; Tyffany Million; Brittany O'Connell
Male Performer of the Year	Best New Starlet
**Jon Dough**‡; Sean Michaels; Alex Sanders	**Kylie Ireland**‡; Chasey Lain
Best Actor—Film	Best Actress—Film
**Buck Adams, No Motive**‡; Buck Adams, Climax 2000; Buck Adams, Hustlers; Jon Dough, Affairs of the Heart; Jon Dough, The Swap Part 2; Jonathan Morgan, Who Killed Holly Hollywood?; Gerry Pike, Sex; Steven St. Croix, Dog Walker; Marc Wallice, The Swap Part 2	**Ashlyn Gere, Masseuse 2**‡; Christina Angel, Dog Walker; Racquel Darrian, Bonnie and Clyde 3 & 4; Nikki Dial, Hardcore; Ashlyn Gere, Steamy Windows; Lené Hefner, The Swap Part 2; Tyffany Million, Climax 2000; Samantha Strong, Erotika; Rebecca Wild, No Motive
Best Actor—Video	Best Actress—Video
**Steven St. Croix, Chinatown**‡; Buck Adams, Gemini; Randy Spears, Bad Habits; Tony Tedeschi, Babe Magnet; Randy West, Fantasy Exchange; Jon Dough, The Face; Sean Michaels, In the Bush; Mike Horner, three different movies	**Ashlyn Gere, Body and Soul**‡; Diedre Holland, Bad Habits; Leena, Pussyman 5; Kelly Royce, In the Bush; Nikki Sinn, Sex Circus
Best Supporting Actor—Film	Best Supporting Actress—Film
**Jon Dough, Sex**‡; Buck Adams, Bonny & Clyde 3 & 4; Jon Dough, Dog Walker; Tony Tedeschi, Hardcore; Marc Wallice, Who Killed Holly Hollywood?; Randy West, Masseuse 2	**Tyffany Million, Sex**‡; Kaitlyn Ashley, American Blonde; Asia Carrera, Masseuse 2; Leena, Masseuse 2; Leena, The Swap, Part 2; Brittany O'Connell, Affairs of the Heart
Best Supporting Actor—Video	Best Supporting Actress—Video
**Jonathan Morgan, The Face**‡; Mark Davis, Bad Habits; Nick East, Jailhouse Cock; Mike Horner, Body of Love; Jake Williams, Wendy Whoppers is the... Ninja CPA; Steven St. Croix	**Kaitlyn Ashley, Shame**‡; Kylie Ireland, Western Nights; Jasper, Paging Betty; Alex Jordan, Body and Soul; Tina Tyler, Big Town; Kelly Royce, The Face; Kelly Royce, The Girl in Room 69
Best Director—Film	Best Director—Video
**John Leslie, Dog Walker**‡; Buck Adams, No Motive; John T. Bone, Who Killed Holly Hollywood?; Cameron Grant, The Dinner Party; Robert McCallum, Erotika; Paul Thomas, Masseuse 2	**John Leslie, Bad Habits**‡; Stuart Canterbury, Pleasure Dome; Frank Marino, The Reel World; Anthony Spinelli, The Face; Mitchell Spinelli, Witness for the Penetration; Frank Zee, Ona Zee; Fantasy Booth; Michael Craig, Body and Soul; Anthony Spinelli, The Face; Jim Enright
Best All-Sex Film	Best All-Sex Video
**The Dinner Party**‡	**Takin' it to the Limit 1 & 2**‡; Anal Diary of Misty Rain; Beauties in Paradise; Pussyman 5 & 6; Virgin Treasures 1 & 2
Best Selling Tape of the Year	Best Renting Tape of the Year
**John Wayne Bobbitt Uncut**‡; Blondage; Dog Walker; Sex; Up and Cummers the Movie	**John Wayne Bobbitt Uncut**‡
Best European Release (Hot Vidéo Award)	Best Continuing Video Series
**Le parfum de Mathilde (Mathilde's Perfume), France**‡; Il Guardaspalle (Rocco Is The Bodyguard), Italy	**Private Video Magazine**‡; Breastman; Buttman; Pussyman; Sleaze Pleaze; Sodomania; Strap-on Sally; The Wonderful World of Wendy Whoppers
Best Couples Sex Scene—Film	Best Couples Sex Scene—Video
**Christina Angel, Steven St. Croix; Dog Walker**‡; Kaitlyn Ashley, Mike Horner; Climax 2000; Zara Whites, Marc Wallice; Desire; Lené Hefner, Marc Wallice; The Swap Part 2; Tanya Summers, Darrien Hart; Virtual Sex; Sunset Thomas, Gerry Pike; Sex; Samantha Strong, Vince Vouyer; Erotika	**Ashlyn Gere, Mike Horner; Body and Soul**‡; Rebecca Wild, Buck Adams; Babewatch; Alex Jordan, Mike Horner; Body and Soul; Mike Horner, Kaitlyn Ashley; Shame; Krista, Mark Davis; Up and Cummers 3; T. T. Boy, Lana; Seymore and Shane: On the Loose
Most Outrageous Sex Scene
**Bionca, Debi Diamond, Tammi Ann; the 'motor oil' scene, Depraved Fantasies**‡; Annabel Chong, Marc Wallice, Ron Jeremy, Tom Byron, one more guy; quadruple penetration scene, Annabel Chong Anal Queen; Angela Summers, Bionca, Debi Diamond, Kaylan Nicole, Shayla LaVeaux, Summer Knight, Tiffany Mynx; the ass tasting contest, Stripper Nurses; Alexis Payne, Sydney Dance, Tom Byron; Tom Byron taking it anally, Takin' It to the Limit; Toilets on parade scene, Up and Cummers the Movie
Best Group Sex Scene—Video	Best All-Girl Sex Scene—Video
**Lacy Rose, Leena, Alex Sanders, Tony Martino, Gerry Pike; Pussyman 5: Captive Audience**‡; Janine Lindemulder, Debi Diamond, Asia Carrera, Tony Tedeschi, Alex Sanders; Bad Girls: Lockdown; Sara, Jessica, Gladys, Felipe, Rocco Siffredi; Bend Over Brazilian Babes 2; Nikki Sinn, Nick East, London Tomlin; Strippers Inc.; Brittania, Erika Bella, Kathy Kash, Kitty Yung, Sidonie Lamour, Alberto Rey, David Perry, Frank Gun; the closing orgy, Virgin Treasures; Krysti Lynn, Sheena, Guy DiSilva, Tim Lake; Buttman's Inferno	**Felecia, Debi Diamond, Bionca, Tammi Ann; Buttslammers 4**‡ ^{1}; Janine Lindemulder, Debi Diamond, Bad Girls: Lockdown; Leena, Krysti Lynn, Kaitlyn Ashley, Rebecca Bardoux; Pussyman 6; Felecia, Misty Rain, Radical Affairs 8

=== Additional award winners ===
These awards were also announced at the awards show, in two winners-only segments read by T. T. Boy, Dyanna Lauren and Tera Heart. Some of the gay awards were announced by Gender and Chris Green.

- Best All-Girl Feature: Creme de Femme
- Best All-Girl Sex Scene, Film: Celeste, Debi Diamond, Misty Rain; The Dinner Party
- Best Alternative Adult Video/Film Featurette: Sex On The Strip
- Best Alternative Feature Film: Killer Looks
- Best Alternative Specialty Tape: Labor Day Wet T&A 1994
- Best Amateur Series: Video Virgins
- Best Amateur Tape: Homegrown Video 432
- Best Anal Sex Scene: Sara, Jessica, Felipe, Rocco Siffredi; Bend Over Brazilian Babes 2
- Best Anal-Themed Feature: Butt-Banged Bicycle Babes
- Best Art Direction—Film: Sex
- Best Art Direction—Video: Shame
- Best Box Cover Concept: Film Buff
- Best Cinematography: Jack Remy, Dog Walker
- Best Compilation Tape: Sodo-Mania: The Baddest Of The Bad
- Best Editing—Film: B. Dennis Wood, Sex
- Best Editing—Video: Phillip Christian, Shame
- Best Ethnic-Themed Video: My Baby Got Back 3
- Best Explicit Series: Infinity 2-Hour Series
- Best Foreign Release: Virgin Treasures 1 & 2
- Best Gang Bang Tape: Starbangers 6
- Best Gonzo Video: Dick & Jane Do Northridge
- Best Group Sex Scene, Film: Gerry Pike, Debi Diamond, Diva, Misty Rain; Sex
- Best Music: Dino Ninn, Sex
- Best Non-Sexual Performance: E. Z. Ryder, Erotika
- Best Original CD-ROM: Nightwatch II
- Best Overall Marketing Campaign: John Wayne Bobbitt: Uncut
- Best Packaging—Film: Sex
- Best Packaging—Video: Blondage
- Best Packaging—Specialty: The Domination of Summer 2
- Best Pro-Am/Gonzo Series: Radical Affairs
- Best Pro-Am Tape: Up 'n' Cummers 7
- Best Screenplay, Film: John Leslie, Dog Walker
- Best Screenplay, Video: Mitchell Spinelli, The Face
- Best Special Effects: Virtual Sex
- Best Specialty Tape—Big Bust: Double D Housewives
- Best Specialty Tape—Bondage: Strictly For Pleasure
- Best Specialty Tape—Other Genre: The Lovers' Guide: Better Orgasms
- Best Specialty Tape—Spanking: Painful Cheeks—Shades of Red
- Best Tease Performance: Christina Angel, Dog Walker
- Best Trailer: Sex
- Best Videography: Phillip Christian Shame

GAY AWARDS:

- Best Bisexual Video: Revenge of the Bi Dolls
- Best Box Cover Concept—Gay Video: Slave Auction
- Best Director—Bisexual Video: Josh Eliot, Revenge of the Bi Dolls
- Best Director—Gay Video: John Rutherford, Flashpoint
- Best Editing—Gay Video: Tab Lloyd, Boot Black
- Best Gay Alternative Video Release: A Gay Man's Guide to Safe Sex
- Best Gay Solo Video: Jeff Stryker, The Tease; Rob Lee's Private Moments (tie)
- Best Gay Specialty Release: The New Pledgemaster
- Best Gay Video: Flashpoint
- Best Music—Gay Video: Sharon Kane, Chris Green; Revenge of the Bi Dolls
- Best Newcomer—Gay Video: Steven Marks
- Best Non-Sexual Role—Gay Video: Sharon Kane, Conflict of Interest
- Best Packaging—Gay Video: Idol Country
- Best Performance in a Gay Video: Ryan Idol, Idol Country
- Best Sex Scene—Gay Video: Trent Reed, Bryce Colby; the cone scene, Flashpoint
- Best Screenplay—Gay Video: Gender, Idol Country
- Best Supporting Performer—Gay Video: Scott Baldwin, Flashpoint
- Best Transsexual Video: Beverly She-Billies
- Best Videography—Gay Video: Kathy Mack, Bruce Cam; Idol Country
- Gay Performer of the Year: Joey Stefano

=== Honorary AVN Awards ===
==== Special Achievement Award ====
- Mark Carriere of Leisure Time Entertainment
- John Stagliano of Evil Angel Productions

==== Hall of Fame ====
AVN Hall of Fame inductees for 1995 were: Robert Bullock, Karen Dior, Chi Chi LaRue, Scotty Fox, Ryan Idol, Sean Michaels, Kelly Nichols, Nikki Randall, Jim South, Sheri St. Clair, Samantha Strong

=== Multiple nominations and awards ===
The following five movies received the most nominations:

Nominations	Movie
14	Dog Walker
14	Sex
10	Shame
9	Body & Soul
9	The Dinner Party

The following ten movies received multiple awards:

Awards	Film
9	Sex
5	Dog Walker
5	Shame
4	Flashpoint
4	Idol Country
3	John Wayne Bobbitt: Uncut
3	Revenge of the Bi Dolls
2	Body & Soul
2	The Dinner Party
2	The Face

== Presenters and performers ==
The following individuals, in order of appearance, presented awards or performed musical numbers or magical acts. The show's trophy girls were Lexus Locklear and Lisa Ann.

=== Presenters ===
Presenters

Name(s)	Role
Marc Wallice; Asia Carrera; Ashlyn Gere; Colt Steele	Presenters of the award for Best Supporting Actress—Video
Steven St. Croix; Dyanna Lauren	Presenters of the award for Best Supporting Actor—Video
Kylie Ireland; Mark Davis; Alex Sanders; Krysti Lynn	Presenters of the awards for Best Supporting Actress—Film and Best Supporting Actor—Film
Kaitlyn Ashley; Ian Daniels; Shelby Stevens; Rebecca Wild; Alicia Rio	Presenters of the awards for Best Group Sex Scene—Video and Best All-Girl Sex Scene—Video
T. T. Boy; Dyanna Lauren	Announced first winners-only segment
Chris Green; Gender	Presenters of the award for Best Supporting Actor—Gay Video
Gene Ross; Wendy Whoppers; Lisa Lipps; Tonisha Mills; Chasey Lain; Sindee Cox	Presenters of the awards for Best Selling Tape, Best Renting Tape and the first Special Achievement Award
Kelly O'Dell; Persia; Lana Sands	Presenters of the awards for Best Couples Sex Scene—Film, Best Couples Sex Scene—Video and Most Outrageous Sex Scene
Veronica Hart; Paul Thomas	Announced the Hall of Fame inductees
David Chryso; Rebecca Lord; N'J De Bahia	Presenters of the Hot Vidéo Award for Best European Release
Mark Kernes; Chanel; VixXxen; Brittany O'Connell	Presenters of the award for Best Continuing Video Series
Steve Drake; Yvonne; Crystal Gold; Jeanna Fine	Presenters of the awards for Male Performer of the Year and Female Performer of the Year
Paul Fishbein	Presenter of the second Special Achievement Award
Tera Heart	Announced second winners-only segment
Shayla LaVeaux	Presenter of the award for Best New Starlet
Steven St. Croix; Tera Heart	Presenters of the award for Best Director—Video
David Christopher; Lilli Xene; Ariana	Presenters of the award for Best Director—Film
Ed Powers; Julia Ann; Janine Lindemulder	Presenters of the awards for Best Actor—Film and Best Actress—Film
Tiffany Mynx; Kaylan Nicole; Sunset Thomas; J. R. Carrington	Presenters of the awards for Best Actor—Video and Best Actress—Video
Seymore Butts; Shane; Jake Williams; Celeste; Sarah Jane Hamilton	Presenters of the awards for Best All-Sex Video and Best All-Sex Film
Jon Dough; Nina Hartley; Shanna McCullough; Juli Ashton; Lacy Rose	Presenters of the award for Best Shot-on-Video Feature
Steven St. Croix; Tera Heart	Presenters of the award for Best Film

=== Performers ===
Performers

Name(s)	Role	Performed
Chi Chi LaRue; Déjà Vu Dreamgirls; La Raf; The Stingers	Performers	Opening number: "The Show Must Go Off"
Randy West and dozens more	Performers	"Great Moments in Adult History" video montage
La Raf	Performers	Magic act
Randy West; Dyanna Lauren; The Stingers	Performers	Closing number: "Nasty"

== Ceremony information ==
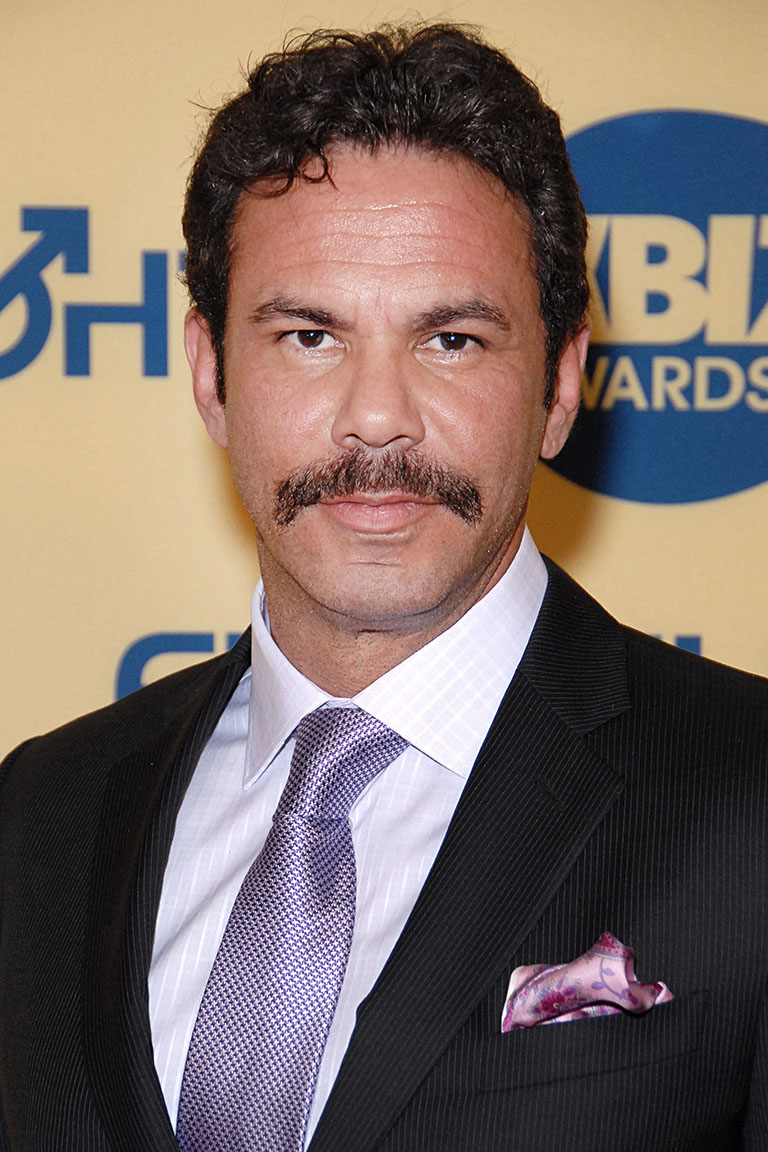
Steven St. Croix hosted the 12th AVN Awards

Actor Steven St. Croix hosted the show for the first time following a three-year stint by actor Randy West. His co-host for the first half of the show was Dyanna Lauren while Tera Heart co-hosted the last half of the show.

Midway through the show, AVN executive editor Gene Ross introduced a montage of scenes of humorous moments from a variety of movies, "Great Moments in Adult Video History", featuring actor Randy West and dozens of others.

Several other people were involved with the production of the ceremony. Gary Miller and Mark Stone served as producer and director for the show while Marco Polo served as director of the broadcast. Stone also served as musical director.

There were several new categories for this year's awards show, including: Best Ethnic-Themed Video, Best Special Effects, the Hot Vidéo Award (Best European Release), Most Outrageous Sex Scene and a couple more awards in gay categories.

John Wayne Bobbitt: Uncut was announced as the movie with the most sales and also the most rentals over the 12 months.

A VHS videotape of the show was also published and sold by VCA Pictures, which had hardcore clips of the winning movies interspersed with the awards presentations. A softcore version was made available on VHS for promotional purposes by NightVision.

=== Critical reception ===
The show received a mixed reception from media publications. Erotic X-Film Guide called the show "a gala, star-studded event equal in glitz and glamor to any mainstream film awards show". However, Oui magazine and Adult Cinema Review said the video montage didn't work and some of the other entertainment was long, boring and tedious.

== In Memoriam ==
AVN publisher Paul Fishbein shared a moment of remembrance for industry performers who died over the past 12 months:

- Jack Baker
- Moana Pozzi
- Michel Ricaud
- Savannah
- Joey Stefano

== See also ==
- AVN Award for Best Actress
- AVN Award for Best Supporting Actress
- AVN Award for Male Performer of the Year
- AVN Award for Male Foreign Performer of the Year
- AVN Award for Female Foreign Performer of the Year
- AVN Female Performer of the Year Award
- List of members of the AVN Hall of Fame

== Notes ==
^1 The wrong winner was announced at the show. Adult Video News magazine corrected the mistake: "A program misprint and the fact that Tammi Ann's name was inadvertently dropped, might have caused some confusion in this category. Buttslammers 3 was announced from the program dais, however Buttslammers 4 is the official winner."

== Bibliography ==
- "CES & AVNA Event Report". Dick magazine (in Japanese). Japan. April 1995.
- "Adult Video News Awards Event Report". Up! U magazine (in Japanese). Japan. April 1995.
