= 11th AVN Awards =

US adult industry award ceremony in 1994

- The 1994 AVN Awards Show Official Program
- Date: January 8, 1994
- Site: Bally’s Hotel and Casino, Paradise, Nevada
- Hosted by: Randy West; Janine Lindemulder; Summer Knight
- Produced by: Gary Miller
- Directed by: S. Marco Di Mercurio

Highlights
- Best Picture: Justine: Nothing To Hide 2 (Best Film)
- Most awards: Justine: Nothing To Hide 2 (8)
- Most nominations: Justine: Nothing To Hide 2 (13)

The 11th AVN Awards ceremony, organized by Adult Video News (AVN), honored pornographic films released in 1993 and took place on January 8, 1994, at Bally's Hotel and Casino in Paradise, Nevada beginning at 7:45 p.m. PST / 10:45 p.m. EST. During the ceremony, AVN presented AVN Awards in 78 categories. The ceremony was produced by Gary Miller. Actor Randy West hosted the show for the third time; his co-hosts were actresses Summer Knight and Janine Lindemulder.

Justine: Nothing to Hide 2 won eight awards, including Best Film and Best Director for Paul Thomas and Best Actress-Film for Roxanne Blaze. A comedy, Haunted Nights, took six awards, while Hidden Obsessions and a gay movie, Romeo & Julian, each won four.

== Winners and nominees ==
Justine: Nothing to Hide 2 led all nominees with thirteen nominations; Whispered Lies had twelve.

The winners were announced during the awards ceremony on January 8, 1994. Jonathan Morgan took home four statuettes, the best showing ever for a male performer. Mike Horner’s award for Best Actor—Film tied him with Eric Edwards as the only other three-time best actor winner. Newcomer Roxanne Blaze, just 19 years old, won the Best Actress award for film for Justine: Nothing To Hide 2."

=== Major awards ===
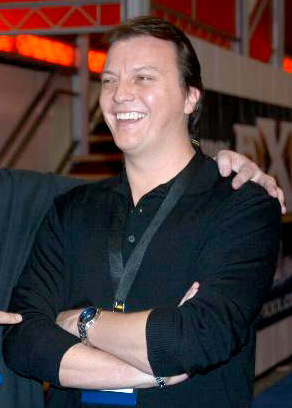
Jonathan Morgan, Male Performer of the Year winner

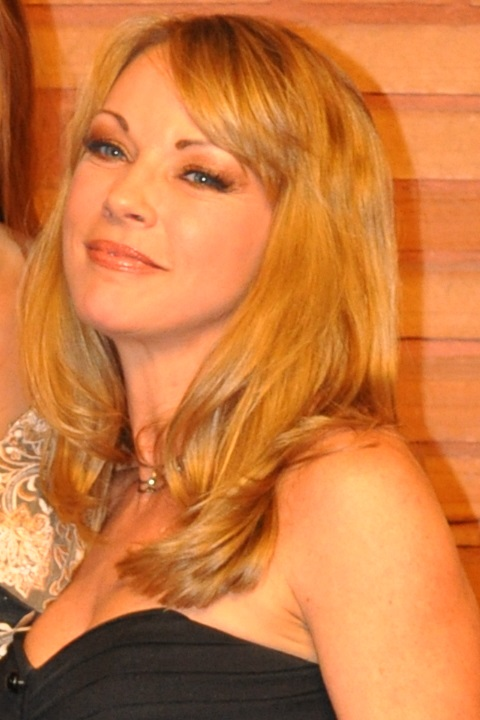
Shayla LaVeaux, Best New Starlet winner

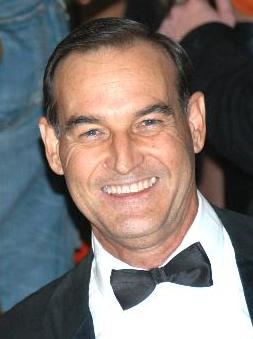
Mike Horner, Best Actor—Film winner

Winners are listed first, highlighted in boldface, and indicated with a double dagger (‡).

Best Film	Best Shot-on-Video Feature
**Justine: Nothing To Hide 2**‡; American Garter; Black Orchid; Blonde Justice 1 & 2; Hidden Obsessions; New Wave Hookers 3; Sex 1 & 2; Sorority Sex Kittens 1 & 2; Things Change; Whispered Lies	**Haunted Nights**‡; Arabian Nights; Cheerleader Nurses; County Line; The Creasemaster's Wife; Guilty By Seduction; Hungry, Part 1; Night and Day; The Rehearsal; Slave to Love
Male Performer of the Year	Female Performer of the Year
**Jonathan Morgan**‡; T. T. Boy; Jon Dough; Steve Drake; Mike Horner; Sean Michaels; Rocco Siffredi; Joey Silvera; Max Steiner; Marc Wallice	**Debi Diamond**‡; Rebecca Bardoux; Celeste; Ashlyn Gere; Shayla LaVeaux; Leena; Tiffany Mynx; P. J. Sparxx; Crystal Wilder; Ona Zee
Best New Starlet	Best Performer, Gay Video
**Shayla LaVeaux**‡; Celeste; Sarah Jane Hamilton; Janine; Dyanna Lauren; Roxanne Blaze; Brittany O’Connell; Lacy Rose; Sunset Thomas; Crystal Wilder	**Johnny Rey, Romeo & Julian**‡; Chuck Barron, Honorable Discharge; Derek Cruise, A Few Fresh Men; Adam Hart, The Voyeur; Tom Katt, Body Search; Grant Larson, Romeo & Julian; Chris McKenzie, Honorable Discharge; Steve Regis, Sunsex Boulevard; Greg Ross, Total Corruption; Danny Sommers, Crossroads
Best Actor—Film	Best Actress—Film
**Mike Horner, Justine: Nothing To Hide 2**‡; Jon Dough, New Wave Hookers 3; Steve Drake, Anonymous; Mike Horner, Sex; Randy Spears, New Lovers; Marc Wallice, Endlessly; Marc Wallice, If These Walls Could Talk 1 & 2	**Roxanne Blaze, Justine: Nothing To Hide 2**‡; Nikki Dial, Things Change 1 & 2; Ashlyn Gere, New Lovers; Deidre Holland, Things Change 1 & 2; Leena, Whispered Lies; Melanie Moore, If These Walls Could Talk 1 & 2; Crystal Wilder, New Wave Hookers 3; Ona Zee, Careless
Best Actor—Video	Best Actress—Video
**Jonathan Morgan, The Creasemaster**‡; T. T. Boy, Neutron Man; Jerry Butler, Puppy Love; Jon Dough, Endangered; Steve Drake, Guilty By Seduction; Mike Horner, Blinded By Love; Jonathan Morgan, Just My Imagination; Steven St. Croix, Arabian Nights; Rocco Siffredi, Frat Girls of Double Double D; Joey Silvera, County Line	**Leena, Blinded By Love**‡; Debi Diamond, Nothing Personal; Dior, Songbird; Deidre Holland, Night and Day; Tiffany Million, The Creasemaster's Wife; Sierra, Slave To Love; P. J. Sparxx, Single White Nympho; Samantha Strong, Hungry, Part 1; Crystal Wilder, Wilder At Heart; Ona Zee, A Portrait of Dorian
Best Supporting Actor—Film	Best Supporting Actress—Film
**Steve Drake, Whispered Lies**‡; T. T. Boy, Sorority Sex Kittens 1 & 2; Nick East, Justine: Nothing to Hide 2; Steven St. Croix, Blind Spot; Rocco Siffredi, New Wave Hookers 3; Randy Spears, Centerfold	**Tianna, Justine: Nothing To Hide 2**‡; Alex Jordan, Blonde Justice 1 & 2; Porsche Lynn, Centerfold; Tiffany Million, New Wave Hookers 3; Brittany O’Connell, If These Walls Could Talk; P. J. Sparxx, Sex 2; Tina Tyler, Careless
Best Supporting Actor—Video	Best Supporting Actress— Video
**Randy Spears, Haunted Nights**‡; Jamie Gillis, Slave to Love; Mike Horner, Surrogate Lover; Ron Jeremy, Puppy Love; Woody Long, Hungry, Parts 1 & 2; Rocco Siffredi, County Line; Joey Silvera, Cheerleader Nurses; Joey Silvera, Frat Girls of Double Double D; Terry Thomas, You Bet Your Buns; Marc Wallice, Guilty By Seduction	**Porsche Lynn, Servin' It Up**‡; Alexis DeVell, Hungry; Alex Jordan, Bare Market; Alex Jordan, Mindshadows 2; Lynn LeMay, The Smart Ass Delinquent; Melanie Rowan, Anal Manor; Lana Sands, Carnal College 2; Devon Shire, The Creasemaster's Wife; Nikki Sinn, Eclipse; Tina Tyler, Juranal Park
Best Director—Film	Best Director—Video
**Paul Thomas, Justine: Nothing To Hide 2**‡; Andrew Blake, Hidden Obsessions; Michael Craig, Jim Holliday; Sorority Sex Kittens 1 & 2; Gregory Dark, New Wave Hookers 3; Jean-Pierre Ferrand, Peter Davy; Whispered Lies; Michael Ninn, Black Orchid; Anthony Spinelli, Careless; Paul Thomas, Things Change	**Jim Enright, Haunted Nights**‡; Michael Craig, Blinded By Love; Michael Craig, Guilty By Seduction; Gregory Dark, The Creasemaster's Wife; Alex de Renzy, Slave To Love; Wesley Emerson, Night and Day; Jim Enright, Jace Rocker; Arabian Nights; John Leslie, The Rehearsal; Frank Marino, Plan 69 From Outer Space; Paul Norman, Hungry, Part 1; Anthony Spinelli, County Line
Best All-Sex Feature	Best Gay Video Feature
**The Bottom Dweller**‡; Bend Over Brazilian Babes; Bikini Beach; Boobarella; Deep Cheeks 4; Pussyman 2; Sodo-Mania 2: More Tails; Sodo-Mania 3; Sodo-Mania 5; Sodo-Mania 6	**Abduction 2 & 3**; A Few Fresh Men; Crossroads; Hey Tony, What's The Story?; Honorable Discharge; Night Heat, Studio 2000; Romeo & Julian; The Roommate; Sex Crimes; Total Corruption
Top Selling Tape of the Year	Top Renting Tape of the Year
**Hidden Obsessions**‡; Blonde Justice, Part 1; Face Dance 1 & 2; New Wave Hookers 3; Sensual Exposure	**New Wave Hookers 3**‡; Blonde Justice, Part 1; Face Dance, Parts 1 & 2; Hidden Obsessions; Pussyman: The Search
Best Sex Scene, Film (Couple)	Best Sex Scene, Video (Couple)
**Mike Horner, Roxanne Blaze; Justine: Nothing To Hide 2**‡; Jonathan Morgan, Lacy Rose; Black Orchid; Nikki Dial, Marc Wallice; Endlessly; Brittany O’Connell, Marc Wallice; If These Walls Could Talk; Roxanne Blaze, Nick East; Justine: Nothing To Hide 2; Julia Ann, Aaron Colt; Les Femmes Erotique; Ashlyn Gere, Randy Spears; the closing scene, New Lovers; Debi Diamond, Marc Wallice; Sensual Exposure; P. J. Sparxx, Rocco Siffredi; Sex 2; Leena, Steve Drake, Melanie Moore; Leena morphing into Melanie Moore scene, Whispered Lies	**T. T. Boy, Sierra; Bikini Beach, Part 1**‡; Leena, Mike Horner; Blinded By Love; Tanya Summers, Steve Drake; Breastman Does the Himalayas; Rocco Siffredi, Rossa; Deep Cheeks 4; Debi Diamond, Jonathan Morgan; The Fury; Celeste, Woody Long; Haunted Nights; Jon Dough, Deidre Holland; Night and Day; Cody O’Connor, Rocco Siffredi; The Rehearsal; Brittany O’Connell, Randy Spears; Slave To Love
Best Sex Scene, Video (Group)	Best All-Girl Sex Scene, Video
**Roxanne Blaze, Steven St. Croix, Crystal Wilder; A Blaze Of Glory**‡; Lacy Rose, Sean Michaels, Jake Steed; double penetration scene, Anus and Andy; Carole Nash, the French Shoe Salesmen (Jamie Gillis and 5 others), Gangbang Girl 9; Sunset Thomas, Peter North, Marc Wallice; Jezebel; 15-Person Orgy, Mindshadows 2; Tabatha Cash, Anisa, Rocco Siffredi; New Ends 1; Betty Gabor, Enny, Belakrouf Mirouane, Jan Hedin; pool table orgy scene, Private Video Magazine #2; Beatrice Valle, Brittany O'Connell, Cash, Jalynn, Kitty Yung, Sierra, Peter North, Randy Spears, Sean Michaels, T. T. Boy, Marc Wallice, 1 more person; 12-Person Orgy, Slave To Love; Sierra, Cody O’Connor, Rocco Siffredi; Sodo-Mania 2: More Tails	**Felecia, Tianna, Sydney St. James, Lia Baren, Celeste; flashlight orgy scene, Buttslammers 2**‡; Summer Knight, Tawny; The Bottom Dweller; Bionca, Lacy Rose, Rebecca Bardoux; Buttslammers; Alex Jordan, Crystal Wilder; Cheerleader Nurses; Bionca, Sarah Jane Hamilton; Indecent Offer; Melanie Moore, Rebecca Bardoux; Seven Good Women; Brittany O’Connell, Carmel St. Clair; Sodo-Mania 4; Alicia Rio, Bionca, Debi Diamond, Sarah Jane Hamilton; girls’ oil orgy scene, Steam; Kiss, Tanya Foxx; Tails From The Zipper; Francesca Lé, Sierra; Waves of Passion

=== Additional award winners ===
These awards were also announced at the awards show, in two winners-only segments read by Angela Summers and Summer Knight.

- Best All-Girl Video: (All The Girls Are) Buttslammers
- Best All-Girl Sex Scene, Film: Janine, Julia Ann; the ice dildo scene, Hidden Obsessions
- Best Alternative Feature Film: Beach Babes From Beyond
- Best Alternative Film Featurette or Specialty Tape: Satin and Lace 2
- Best Alternative Video: Sex on the Beach
- Best Amateur Tape: New Faces, Hot Bodies 6: The Exchange Student, Part One—Favors
- Best Amateur Series: Amorous Amateurs
- Best Anal Scene: Tiffany Mynx, Randy West, Kitty Yung; Sodo-Mania 5
- Best Anal-Themed Tape: Anal Siege
- **Best Art Direction, Film** (tie): Hidden Obsessions, Immortal Desire
- Best Art Direction, Video: Haunted Nights
- Best Boxcover Concept: Rocket Girls
- Best Cinematography: Andrew Blake, Hidden Obsessions
- Best Compilation Tape: Buttwoman's Favorite Endings
- Best Editing, Film: Philip Christian, Immortal Desire
- Best Editing, Video: Kunga Sludge, The Creasemaster's Wife
- Best Explicit Series: Kink-O-Rama
- Best Foreign Release: Private Video Magazine, Volume 1
- Best Gonzo Tape: Seymore Butts In Paradise
- Best Music: Let's Play Music, Les Femmes Erotique
- Best New Director, Film: Flavio Paris, Butt-O-Rama
- Best New Director, Video: Dale Lavi, Perpetual Tuesdays
- Best Non-Sex Performance, Film or Video: Jonathan Morgan, Haunted Nights
- Best Overall Marketing Campaign: American Garter, VCA Platinum
- Best Packaging, Film: Whispered Lies
- Best Packaging, Specialty: Dude Looks Like A Lady
- Best Packaging, Video (tie): Hungry, Part 1; Pussyman: The Search
- Best Pro-Am Tape: More Dirty Debutantes 22
- Best Pro-Am Series: More Dirty Debutantes
- Best Screenplay, Film: Raven Touchstone, Justine: Nothing to Hide 2
- Best Screenplay, Video: Jace Rocker, Jonathan Morgan; Haunted Nights
- Best Sex Scene, Film (Group): Rocco Siffredi, Tiffany Million, Jon Dough, Lacy Rose, Crystal Wilder, Francesca Lé; New Wave Hookers 3
- Best Specialty Tape, Big Bust: Boobarella
- Best Specialty Tape, Bondage: Kym Wilde's Ocean View
- Best Specialty Tape, Other Genre: A Scent Of Leather
- Best Specialty Tape, Spanking: Defiance: Spanking and Beyond
- Best Tease Performance: Tianna, Justine: Nothing To Hide 2
- Best Videography: Kathy Mack, Joe Rock, Frank Marino; Pussyman 2

**GAY VIDEO AWARDS**

- Best Bisexual Video: Valley of the Bi Dolls
- Best Boxcover Concept, Gay Video: Hologram
- Best Director, Bisexual Video: Josh Eliot, Valley of the Bi Dolls
- Best Director, Gay Video: Sam Abdul, Romeo & Julian
- Best Editing, Gay Video: Tab Lloyd, Total Corruption
- Best Gay Alternative Specialty Video: Male Genital Massage
- Best Gay Alternative Video Release: Chi Chi LaRue's Hardbody Video Magazine
- Best Gay Solo Video: Pumping Fever
- Best Music, Gay Video: Michael Anton, Tom Alex, Sharon Kane; Romeo & Julian
- Best Newcomer, Gay Video: Zak Spears
- Best Non-Sex Performance, Gay Video: Gino Colbert, Honorable Discharge
- Best Packaging, Gay Video: Hologram
- Best Screenplay, Gay Video: Jerry Douglas, Honorable Discharge
- Best Sex Scene, Gay Video: Johnny Rey, Grant Larson, Romeo & Julian
- Best Supporting Performer, Gay Video: Zak Spears, Total Corruption
- Best Videography, Gay Video: Todd Montgomery, Abduction 2 & 3

=== Honorary AVN Awards ===
==== Special Achievement Award ====
- Bob Best, of Bon-Vue
- Howie Wasserman, Paul Wisner, Bruce Walker, Ron Wasserman; Gourmet Video
- Susan Colvin, Don Browning, Christian Mann; Video Team/CPLC
- Michael Warner, Ron Zdeb; Great Western Litho
- Russell Hampshire, of VCA Pictures
- Marty Feig, of Las Vegas Video
- Sidney Niekerk, Jack Gallagher; Cal Vista Video

==== Hall of Fame ====
AVN Hall of Fame inductees for 1994 were: Buck Adams, Juliet Anderson, Bionca, Tiffany Clark, Lisa De Leeuw, Steve Drake, Harold Lime, Robert McCallum, Ed Powers, Janus Rainer, Mitchell Spinelli, Raven Touchstone

=== Multiple nominations and awards ===
Among the movies receiving the most nominations were: Justine: Nothing to Hide 2 with 13, Whispered Lies with 12 and Haunted Nights with nine.

The following thirteen movies received multiple awards:

- 8 - Justine: Nothing To Hide 2
- 6 - Haunted Nights
- 4 - Hidden Obsessions, Romeo & Julian
- 2 - Abduction 2 & 3, Hologram, Honorable Discharge, Immortal Desire, New Wave Hookers 3, Total Corruption, Valley of the Bi Dolls, Whispered Lies, More Dirty Debutantes 22

== Presenters and performers ==
The following individuals, in order of appearance, presented awards or performed musical numbers. The show's trophy girls were Christina Angel and Felecia.

=== Presenters ===
Presenters

Name(s)	Role
Julia Ann; Celeste; Alex Sanders	Presenters of the awards for Best Supporting Actor—Video and Best Supporting Actress—Video
Lacy Rose; Chasey Lain; Woody Long	Presenters of the awards for Best Supporting Actress—Film and Best Supporting Actor—Film
Jon Dough; Tara Monroe; Tami Monroe; Shayla LaVeaux; Brittany O'Connell	Presenters of the award for Best Group Sex Scene—Video
Seymore Butts; Shane	Presenters of the award for Best All-Girl Sex Scene—Video
Angela Summers; Dyanna Lauren	Announced first winners-only segment
Paul Fishbein	Presenter of the Special Achievement Awards
Nina Hartley; Tom Byron	Introduction of the AVN Hall of Fame inductees
Tiffany Mynx; Tiffany Towers; Tiffany Million; Tony Tedeschi	Presenters of the awards for Best Couples Sex Scene—Film and Best Couples Sex Scene—Video
Ron Jeremy; Sahara Sands; Champagne	Presenters of the awards for Male Performer of the Year and Female Performer of the Year
Lisa Lipps; Wendy Whoppers; Domonique; Rebecca Wild	Presenters of the awards for Top Selling Tape of the Year and Top Renting Tape of the Year
Summer Knight	Announced second winners-only segment
Alex Jordan	Presenter of the award for Best New Starlet
Ashlyn Gere; Porsche Lynn; Alexis DeVell; Lexus Locklear	Presenters of the awards for Best Director—Film and Best Director—Video
Steven St. Croix; Julian St. Jox; Serenity	Presenters of the awards for Best Actor—Film and Best Actress—Film
Debi Diamond; Steffi; Lené Hefner; Misty Rain; Joey Verducci	Presenters of the awards for Best Actor—Video and Best Actress—Video
Ona Zee; Leena; Jonathan Morgan; Deidre Holland	Presenters of the awards for Best All-Sex Feature and Best Shot-on-Video Feature
Randy West; Summer Knight	Presenters of the award for Best Film

=== Performers ===
Performers

Name(s)	Role	Performed
Randy West; The Stingers	Performers	Opening number: “What Do You Call A Movie?”
Dyanna Lauren; The Stingers	Performers	Musical number: “I'll Make You Feel Like a Man”
Chi Chi LaRue; The Stingers	Performers	Closing number: “Love Doll”

== Ceremony information ==
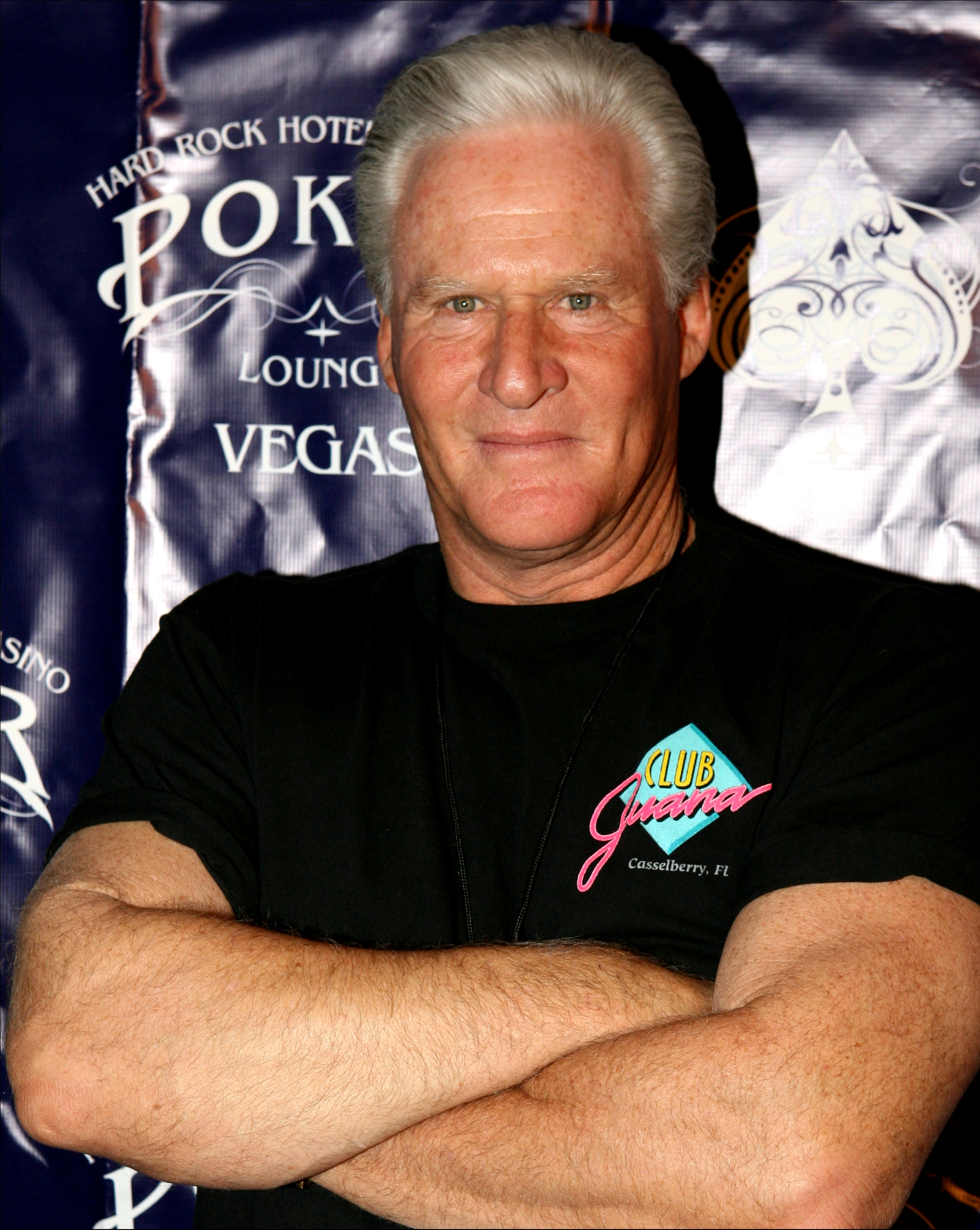
Randy West hosted the 11th AVN Awards

Actor Randy West hosted the show for the third consecutive year. His co-host for the first half of the show was Janine Lindemulder while Summer Knight co-hosted the last half. Randy West opened the show with a song, “What Do You Call a Movie?”, the lyrics of which contained titles of about 40 movies from the past year.

Several other people were involved with the production of the ceremony. The live show was produced by Gary Miller while musical direction was undertaken by Mark J. Miller. A VHS videotape of the show was also published and sold by VCA Pictures, which was produced and directed by S. Marco Di Mercurio.

Just prior to presentation of the award for Best All-Girl Sex Scene—Video, Shane pulled out an engagement ring at the podium and proposed marriage to her co-presenter Seymore Butts. A surprised Seymore Butts then pulled an engagement ring out of his pocket and said he had also intended to propose to Shane that evening, then promptly went down on his knees to do so.

There were several new categories this year, or categories now split in two between film and video: Best Sex Scene—Film (Group), Best Sex Scene—Film (Couple), Best Sex Scene—Film (All-Girl), Best Sex Scene—Video (Group), Best Sex Scene—Video (Couple), Best Sex Scene—Video (All-Girl), Best Anal Sex Scene, Best Art Direction—Film, Best Art Direction—Video, Best Explicit Series, Best Foreign Release, Best Amateur Series, Best Pro-Am Series, Best Alternative Release—Video, Best Alternative Release—Film, Best Gay Alternative Video Release, Best Gay Alternative Specialty Video.

Hidden Obsessions was announced as the top selling movie of the year, while New Wave Hookers 3 was announced as the top renting tape of the year.

== See also ==
- AVN Award for Best Actress
- AVN Award for Best Supporting Actress
- AVN Award for Male Performer of the Year
- AVN Award for Male Foreign Performer of the Year
- AVN Award for Female Foreign Performer of the Year
- AVN Female Performer of the Year Award
- List of members of the AVN Hall of Fame

== Bibliography ==
- "EFG on Location: Night of the X-Stars". Erotic X-Film Guide. United States. December 1994. p. 14.
- "Sex on the Strip: Las Vegas Porn Awards' Premiere Pussy". High Society. United States. July 1994. p. 72.
