= 13th AVN Awards =

US adult industry award ceremony in 1996

- The 1996 AVN Awards Show VHS box cover
- Date: January 7, 1996
- Site: Aladdin Theatre for the Performing Arts, Paradise, Nevada
- Hosted by: Bobby Slayton; Jenna Jameson; Julia Ann
- Produced by: Gary Miller
- Directed by: Mark Stone

Highlights
- Best Picture: Blue Movie (Best Film)
- Most awards: Latex (11)

Television coverage
- Network: Spice Networks

The 13th AVN Awards ceremony, organized by Adult Video News (AVN) honored the best pornographic films of 1995 and took place on January 7, 1996 at the Aladdin Theatre for the Performing Arts in Paradise, Nevada, beginning at 8:15 p.m. PST / 11:15 p.m. EST. During the ceremony, AVN presented AVN Awards in 97 categories. The ceremony, taped for broadcast in the United States by Spice Networks, was produced and directed by Gary Miller and Mark Stone. Comedian Bobby Slayton hosted the show for the first time, alongside actress co-hosts Jenna Jameson and Julia Ann. Hall of Fame inductees were honored at a gala held a month earlier.

Latex won the most statuettes, taking 11. Other winners included Blue Movie with four awards and gay video The Renegade with three.

== Winners and nominees ==
The winners were announced during the awards ceremony on January 7, 1996. Latex won 11 of the 14 categories in which it was nominated. Rocco Siffredi became the first two-time winner of the Male Performer of the Year award. Jenna Jameson was the first Best New Starlet award winner to also take home a Best Actress award. Mike Horner won his fourth Best Actor—Film award.

=== Major awards ===
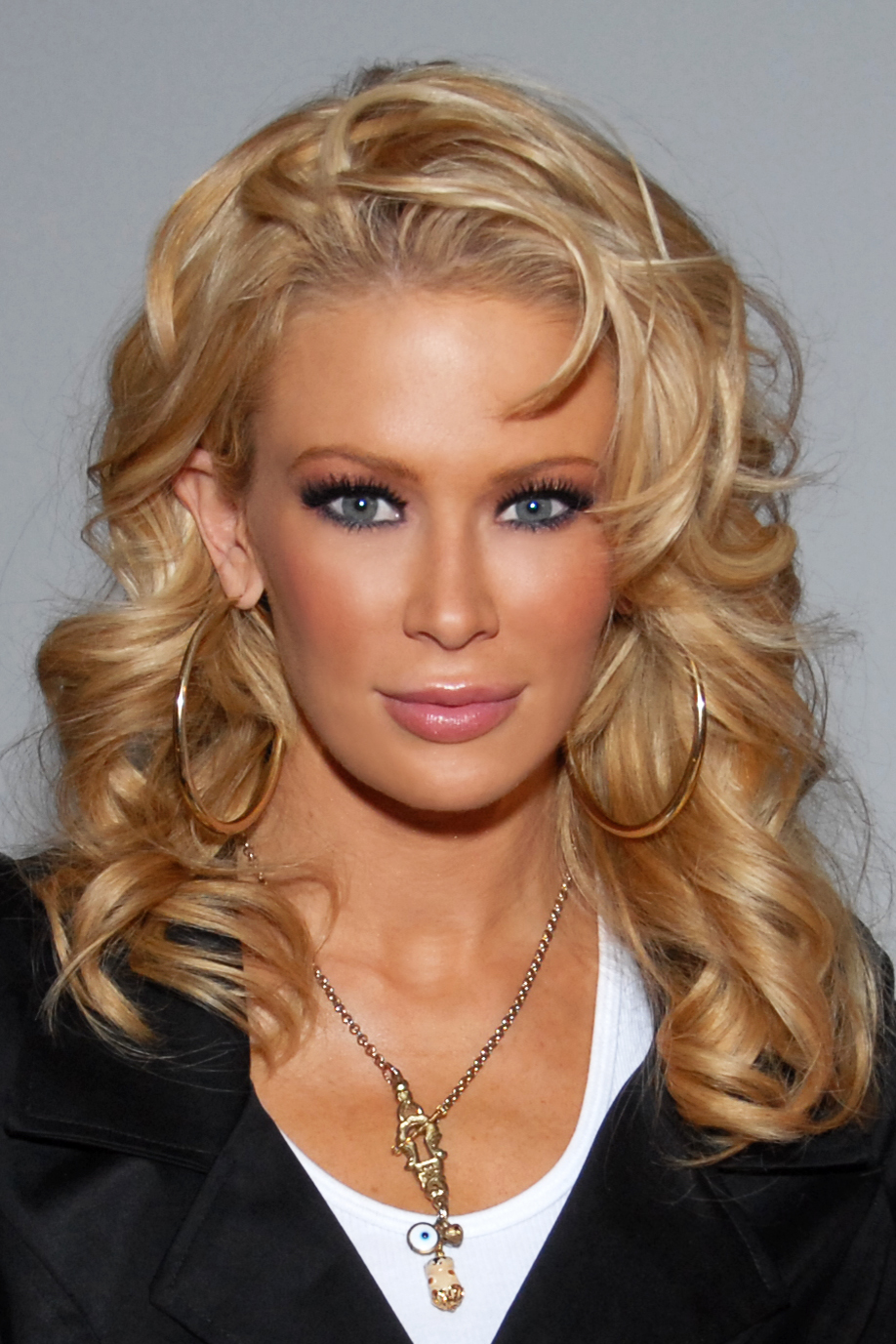
Jenna Jameson, Best New Starlet winner

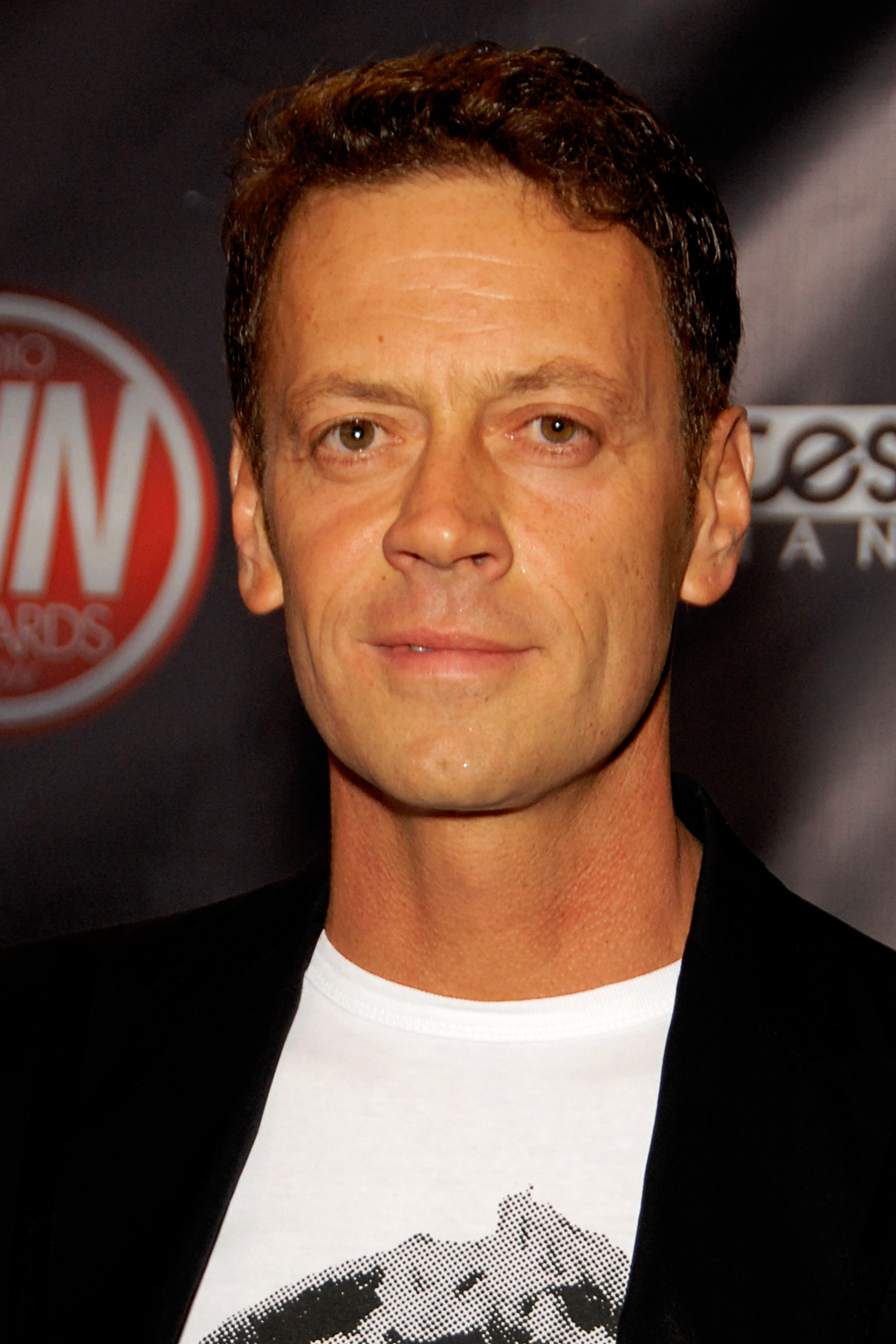
Rocco Siffredi, Male Performer of the Year winner

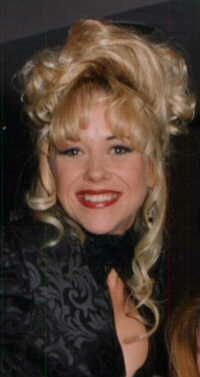
Kaitlyn Ashley, Female Performer of the Year winner

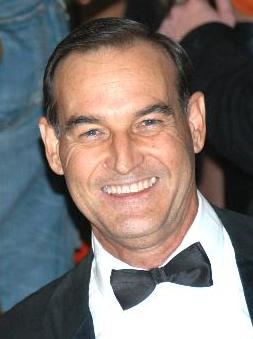
Mike Horner, Best Actor—Film winner

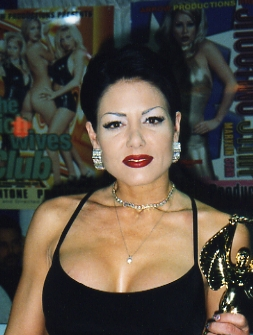
Jeanna Fine, Best Actress—Film winner

Winners are listed first, highlighted in boldface, and indicated with a double dagger (‡).

Best Film	Best Shot-on-Video Feature
**Blue Movie**‡; Borderline; Cinesex 1 & 2; A Clockwork Orgy; Comeback; Exstasy; The Girl With the Heart-Shaped Tattoo; Heartbeat; Lessons in Love; Marquis de Sade; The Passion; Russian Roulette; Sex 2; Skin Hunger	**Latex**‡; Compulsive Behaviour; Devil in Miss Jones 5; Every Woman Has a Fantasy 3; Gigolo 1 & 2; Lingerie; New Wave Hookers 4; The Razor's Edge; The Tower 1, 2 & 3
Best New Starlet
**Jenna Jameson**‡; Davia Ardell; Juli Ashton; J. R. Carrington; Sid Deuce; Melissa Hill; Jill Kelly; Rachel Love; Lovette; Marilyn Star; Nici Sterling; Jenteal
Male Performer of the Year	Female Performer of the Year
**Rocco Siffredi**‡; T. T. Boy; Jon Dough; Steve Hatcher; Steven St. Croix; Alex Sanders; Tony Tedeschi	**Kaitlyn Ashley**‡; Tammi Ann; Juli Ashton; Celeste; Careena Collins; Jeanna Fine; Tera Heart; Melissa Hill; Jenna Jameson; Lana Sands; Nici Sterling
Best Actor—Film	Best Actress—Film
**Mike Horner, Lessons in Love**‡; Jon Dough, Heartbeat; Jonathan Morgan, On Her Back; Steven St. Croix, Cinesex; Steven St. Croix, Blue Movie; Tony Tedeschi, Skin Hunger; Randy West, Companion: Aroused 2	**Jeanna Fine, Skin Hunger**‡; Christy Canyon, Comeback; Celeste, Borderline; Jeanna Fine, Blue Movie; Melissa Hill, Girl with the Heart-Shaped Tattoo; Kylie Ireland, The Passion; Dyanna Lauren, Night Play; Leena, Cinesex 1 & 2; Tiffany Million, Silk Stockings; Tiffany Million, Exstasy
Best Actor—Video	Best Supporting Actress—Film
**Jon Dough, Latex**‡; Mike Horner, Butt Detective; Jonathan Morgan, Risque Burlesque; Alex Sanders, Strip Poker; Joey Silvera, Fresh Meat; Steven St. Croix, The Romeo Syndrome; Steven St. Croix, Generally Horny Hospital; Tony Tedeschi, Anal Intruder 9: The Butt from Another Planet; Marc Wallice, Candy Factory	**Ariana, Desert Moon**‡; Lisa Ann, Skin Hunger; Asia Carrera, Comeback; Nina Hartley, Night Play; Jenna Jameson, Blue Movie; Tiffany Million, Sex 2; Tina Tyler, Forever Young
Best Supporting Actor—Video	Best Supporting Actress—Video
**Alex Sanders, Dear Diary**‡; Ron Jeremy, Fresh Meat; Jonathan Morgan, Sex Lives of Clowns; Joey Silvera, Sorority Stewardesses; Tony Tedeschi, Renegades; Tony Tedeschi, Risque Burlesque; Marc Wallice, Sloppy Seconds	**Jeanna Fine, Dear Diary**‡; Ariana, Black Flava; Celeste, Bad Girls 6; Melissa Hill, Arrowhead; Jordan Lee, The Artist; Ona Zee, Razor's Edge
Best Director—Film	Best Director—Video
**Michael Zen, Blue Movie**‡; Nic Cramer, A Clockwork Orgy; Toni English, Girl With the Heart-Shaped Tattoo; Jean-Pierre Ferrand, Russian Roulette; Robert McCallum, Exstasy; Michael Ninn, Sex 2; Phil M. Noir, The Passion; O, Lessons in Love; Mitch Spinelli, Heartbeat; Paul Thomas, Borderline; Paul Thomas, Comeback; Michael Zen, Cinesex 1 & 2	**Michael Ninn, Latex**‡; Stuart Canterbury, Natural Born Thrillers; Gregory Dark, Devil in Miss Jones 5; Teri Diver and Tom Elliot, Compulsive Behaviour; Edwin Durrell, Every Woman Has a Fantasy 3; Jim Enright, Risque Burlesque; Jim Holliday, Sorority Stewardesses; John Leslie, Fresh Meat; Mark Stone, Sex Trek 4 & 5; Mondo Tundra, The Butt Detective; Pierre Woodman, Gigolo 1 & 2; Ona Zee and Frank Zee, Razor's Edge
Best Sex Comedy	Best All-Sex Video
**Risque Burlesque**‡; The Butt Detective; Generally Horny Hospital; On Her Back; Pubic Access; Sex Trek IV & V; Sorority Stewardesses; Spirit Guide; The XXX Files: Lust in Space	**Bottom Dweller 33 1/3**‡; Buttman's European Vacation; The Coming of Nikita; Dirty Tricks; Fazano's Student Bodies; Kink; Pussyman 8: The Squirt Queens; Rocco Goes to Prague; Sluts ’n Angels in Budapest; Stretchin’ the Rear; Sodomania 12; Takin’ it to the Limit 6
Best Selling Tape of the Year	Best Renting Tape of the Year
**Latex**‡	**Latex**‡
Best Couples Sex Scene—Film	Best Couples Sex Scene—Video
**T. T. Boy, Jenna Jameson, Blue Movie**; Tony Tedeschi, Christy Canyon, Comeback; Debi Diamond, T. T. Boy, Girl with the Heart-Shaped Tattoo; Kaitlyn Ashley, Joey Silvera; Heartbeat; Rocco Siffredi, Rosa Caracciolo, first scene; Jungle Heat; Rocco Siffredi, Rosa Caracciolo; Marquis de Sade; Rocco Siffredi, Celeste; Nylon; Kaitlyn Ashley, T. T. Boy; Reality and Fantasy; Gerry Pike, Shayla LaVeaux; Sex 2; Lisa Ann, Steven St. Croix; Skin Hunger	**Debbie Dee, Rocco Siffredi, Buttman's Big Tit Adventure 3**; Ben Dover, Nici Sterling, Wilde Oscar; Ben Dover's British Butt Search; Kirsty Waay, Jon Dough; Fresh Meat; Amber Woods, Nick East; Generally Horny Hospital; Brittany O’Connell, Mike Horner; Intersextion; Jon Dough, Sid Deuce; Jon Dough's Dirty Stories; Sindee Coxx, Tom Byron; Natural Born Thrillers; Alex Sanders, Sid Deuce; Pool Party at Seymore's 1; Rocco Siffredi, Sandy; Sandy Insatiable; Seymore Butts, Kylie Ireland; Seymore and Shane Do Ireland; Christoph Clark, Cristina Valenti; Sluts ’n Angels in Budapest; Melissa Hill, Jon Dough, Ashlyn Gere, Sean Michaels; Visions 2
Most Outrageous Sex Scene	Best All-Girl Sex Scene—Video
**Channone, David Perry, Jean-Yves Le Castel, Sex under the Eiffel Tower, Private Video Magazine 20**; Debi Diamond, food group masturbation scene, Coming Attractions; Shonna Lynn, the ghoul scene, Depraved Fantasies 4; Teri Weigel, Marc Wallice, Vince Vouyer, double vaginal, Encore; Corral scene, Kink 2; Domonique Simone and Sean Michaels in a helicopter, The Passion; Gaping anus scene, Marquis de Sade; Alex Sanders, Nicole Lace, Nici Sterling, Jon Dough, infantilism scene; Sodomania 12; Fallon, Ron Jeremy, Dave Hardman, Dick Nasty, 3 other guys, Head on a silver platter, Stuff Your Face Again; Annabel Chong, Trapeze gang bang, What's a Nice Girl Like You Doing in an Anal Movie?; Kimberly Kyle, Blowup doll scene, Wicked Ways 2; Coralie, Mark Davis, Sean Michaels, Threeway on a Paris metro, World Sex Tour	**Felecia, Careena Collins, Jill Kelly, Misty Rain, Traci Allen; Takin’ It to the Limit 6**; Assmania 2; Babes of the Bay 2; The Butt Detective; Candy Factory; Every Woman Has a Fantasy 3; Life's a Beach; Pussyman 9; Sorority Stewardesses; Stretchin’ the Rear; The Voyeur 5; Whispered Secrets of the Call Girls

=== Additional award winners ===
These awards were also announced at the awards show, most in a winners-only segment for technical achievements read by Dyanna Lauren or a second winners-only segment read by Julia Ann.

- Best Actress, Video: Jenna Jameson, Wicked One
- Best All-Girl Feature: Buttslammers 10
- Best All-Girl Sex Scene, Film: Felecia, Misty Rain, Jenteal; Fantasy Chamber
- Best All-Sex Film: The Player
- Best Alternative Adult Feature Film: Under Lock & Key
- Best Alternative Adult Film Featurette or Specialty Tape: The Best of Pamela Anderson
- Best Alternative Adult Video: Buttman at Nudes a Poppin' 2
- Best Amateur Tape: New Faces, Hot Bodies 17
- Best Amateur Series: Mike Hott Video
- Best Anal Sex Scene, Film: Gaping anus scene; Marquis de Sade
- Best Anal Sex Scene, Video: Careena Collins & Jake Steed—blindfold anal; Bottom Dweller 33 1/3
- Best Anal-Themed Feature: Anal Intruder 9: The Butt from Another Planet
- Best Art Direction, Film: Cinesex 1 & 2
- Best Art Direction, Video: Latex
- Best Bisexual Video: Remembering Times Gone Bi
- Best Box Cover Concept: Strip Tease
- Best Box Cover Concept—Gay Video: Courting Libido
- Best CD-ROM Graphics/Art Direction: Virtual Valerie 2
- Best CD-ROM Photo Disk: Visions of Erotica
- Best Cinematography: Bill Smith, Sex 2
- Best Compilation Tape: Pussyman 11: Prime Cuts
- Best Continuing Video Series: Takin' It to the Limit
- Best Director, Bisexual Video: James C. Stark, Remembering Times Gone Bi
- Best Director, Gay Video: John Rutherford, The Renegade
- Best Editing for a Film: Michael Zen, Blue Movie
- Best Editing—Gay Video: Josh Eliot, Jawbreaker
- Best Ethnic-Themed Video: My Baby Got Back 6
- Best European Release (The Hot Vidéo Award): Hamlet: For the Love of Ophelia (Italy)
- Best Explicit Series: Vivid 4-Hour Series
- Best Featurette Tape: Sodomania 12
- Best Foreign Feature: The Tower 1, 2 & 3
- Best Foreign Featurette Tape: Private Video Magazine 20
- Best Gang Bang Tape: 30 Men for Sandy
- Best Gay Alternative Video Release: Siberian Heat
- Best Gay Solo Video: Rex Chandler: One on One
- Best Gay Specialty Release: Pissed
- Best Gay Video: The Renegade
- Best Gonzo Video: Pool Party at Seymore's 1 & 2
- Best Gonzo Series: The Voyeur
- Best Group Sex Scene, Film: Orgy Finale; Borderline
- Best Group Sex Scene, Video: Stephanie Sartori, Erika Bella, Mark Davis, Sean Michaels; World Sex Tour, Vol. 1
- Best Interactive CD-ROM: Space Sirens 2
- Best Interactive CD-ROM Game: Adventures of Seymore Butts II: In Pursuit of Pleasure
- Best Music: Dino Ninn, Latex
- Best Music, Gay Video: Sharon Kane & Casey Jordan, Johnny Rey's Sex Series 2: Score of Sex
- Best Newcomer, Gay Video: Ken Ryker
- Best Non-Sex Performance, Film or Video: Veronica Hart, Nylon
- Best Non-Sexual Performance—Gay, Bi, Trans Video: Lana Luster, Driven Home
- Best Original CD-ROM Concept: Virtual Sex Shoot
- Best Overall Marketing Campaign: Virtual Max 3-D System
- Best Packaging, Film: Borderline
- Best Packaging—Gay Video: An Officer and His Gentleman
- Best Packaging, Specialty: The Journal of O
- Best Packaging, Video: Style 2
- Best Performer—Gay Video: Ken Ryker, The Renegade
- Best Pro-Am Series: Up and Cummers
- Best Pro-Am Tape: More Dirty Debutantes 38
- Best Screenplay, Film: Raven Touchstone, Cinesex 1 & 2
- Best Screenplay, Gay Video: Jerry Douglas, The Diamond Stud
- Best Screenplay, Video: Jace Rocker, Risque Burlesque
- Best Sex Scene, Gay Video: Daryl Brock, Chip Daniels, Rod Majors, Ty Russell, Scott Russell; Jawbreaker
- Best Special Effects: Latex
- Best Specialty Tape, Bondage: Kym Wilde's On the Edge 23
- Best Specialty Tape, Big Bust: Tits
- Best Specialty Tape, Other Genre: Leg Tease
- Best Specialty Tape, Spanking: Blistered Your Buns
- Best Supporting Actor, Film: Steven St. Croix, Forever Young
- Best Supporting Performer, Gay Video: Johnny Rahm, All About Steve
- Best Tease Performance: Christy Canyon, Comeback
- Best Trailer: Latex
- Best Transsexual Video: A Real Man
- Best Video Editing: D3, Latex
- Best Videography: Barry Harley, Latex
- Best Videography—Gay Video: Todd Montgomery, Big River
- Gay Video Performer of the Year: J. T. Sloan

=== Honorary AVN Awards ===
==== Special Achievement Award ====
- Ed Powers, 4-Play Video

==== Hall of Fame ====
AVN Hall of Fame inductees for 1996, announced at a gala a month prior to the AVN Awards show, were: Andrew Blake, Gino Colbert, The Dark Brothers, Ashlyn Gere, Savannah, Matt Sterling, Jennifer Welles, Tori Welles

=== Multiple nominations and awards ===
Latex won the most statuettes, taking 11 of the 14 categories in which it was nominated. Other winners included Blue Movie with four awards and gay video The Renegade with three. Two statuettes went to each of Borderline, Bottom Dweller 33 1/3, Cinesex 1 & 2, Dear Diary, Jawbreaker, Private Video Magazine 20, Remembering Times Gone Bi and Risque Burlesque.

== Presenters and performers ==
The following individuals, in order of appearance, presented awards or performed musical numbers or comedy. The show's trophy girls were Houston and Tracy Love.

=== Presenters ===
Presenters

Name(s)	Role
Tabitha Stevens; Sahara Sands; Sindee Cox; Celeste; Alex Sanders	Presenters of the awards for Best All-Girl Sex Scene—Video and Best Group Sex Scene—Video
Melissa Hill; Jenteal; Colt Steel; Alicia Rio	Presenters of the awards for Best Supporting Actor—Film and Best Supporting Actress—Film
Tiffany Million; Marylin Star; Mark Davis; Micki Lynn	Presenters of the Awards for Best Supporting Actor—Video and Best Supporting Actress—Video
Dyanna Lauren	Announced the winners in various technical achievement categories
Gene Ross	Presenter of the Special Achievement Award
Tawny Peaks; Otto & George; Troupe; Crystal Storm; Lori Wagner; Rocki Roads	Presenters of the award for Most Outrageous Sex Scene
Misty Rain; Jeanna Fine; Steve Hatcher; Dave Nelson	Presenters of the awards for Best Couples Sex Scene—Film and Best Couples Sex Scene—Video
Chad Connors; Ty; Sonny Markham; Crystal Crawford; Chip Daniels	Presenters of the awards for Best Director—Gay Video and Gay Video Performer of the Year
David Chryso; Coralie; Delilah	Presenters of the Hot Vidéo Award (Best European Release)
	Abbreviated Hall of Fame sequence, which announced inductees previously honored at a gala
Christy Canyon; Randy West; Sid Deuce; Kia; Shanna McCullough; Nina Hartley	Presenters of the awards for Male Performer of the Year and Female Performer of the Year
Paul Fishbein	Presenter of the awards for Best Selling Tape and Best Renting Tape
Julia Ann	Announced winners in the second winners-only segment
Kylie Ireland	Presenter of the award for Best New Starlet
Nikki Tyler; Jon Dough; Rosa Caracciolo; Rocco Siffredi	Presenters of the awards for Best Director—Video and Best Director—Film
Careena Collins; Tom Byron; Chasey Lain; Melissa Monet	Presenters of the awards for Best Actor—Video and Best Actress—Video
Lisa Ann; Ice-T; Shane; Juli Ashton; Peter North; Kaitlyn Ashley; Tammi Ann	Presenters of the awards for Best Actor—Film and Best Actress—Film
Karen Dior; Dino Phillips; Johnny Rey; Jordan Young	Presenters of the award for Best Gay Video
Rebecca Lord; Rebecca Wild; Steven St. Croix; Kaylan Nicole; Janine	Presenters of the awards for Best All-Sex Video and Best Sex Comedy
Shyla Foxx; Jasmine St. Clair; Nici Sterling; T. T. Boy; Jonathan Morgan	Presenters of the awards for Best Shot-on-Video Feature and Best Film

=== Performers ===
Performers

Name(s)	Role	Performed
Dyanna Lauren; Serenity and Her Dancers; The Stingers	Performer	Opening number: "Give Me Liberty"
Bobby Slayton	Host	Standup comedy
Otto & George	Performer	Ventriloquist comedy act
Al Goldstein	Performer	Introduces video segment in which Ron Jeremy gets killed
Bobby Slayton	Host	Introduces "a statement-making video meditation on Hollywood hypocrisy"
Chi Chi LaRue; The Lollypop Girls; The Stingers	Performer	Musical number: "The Lollypop Song"

== Ceremony information ==
The 13th AVN Awards Show marked the first time the awards show was open to the public. In addition, Bobby Slayton was the show's first host who was not affiliated with the adult film industry. The theme of the show was "Give me liberty."

Several other people and elements were also involved with the production of the ceremony. Gary Miller and Mark Stone served as producer and director for the show while Marco Polo served as director of the broadcast. Mark Stone served as musical director for the ceremony. Choreographer Serenity supervised the performances of the dance numbers. Ventriloquist act Otto & George performed standup comedy during the proceedings.

Best Sex Comedy was a new category at this year's show.

Latex was announced as both the top selling movie and the top renting movie of the year.

Adult PC Guide magazine noted the show was videotaped for broadcast on Spice Networks and featured "a huge set, motion-controlled cameras and a production that would have rivaled the Oscars." A VHS videotape of the show was also published and sold by VCA Pictures.

=== Critical reviews ===
High Society magazine said, "Nothing that happened at the Oscars could possibly top this evening for excitement." Adult Cinema Review called the show "dazzling." It noted serving food in an auditorium gave way to chaos and "thousands of jabbering people made it hard to accomplish anything but light conversation," however, "there were no real complaints."

== In Memoriam ==
Paul Fishbein "memorialized three performers in the industry who passed away this year:" Alex Jordan, Cal Jammer and Kristi Lynn.

== Bibliography ==
- "Porn Video Award Show: World's Rudest & Raunchiest Pussy Party: Your Backstage Pass!". Cheri Magazine. July 1996.
- "Awards in the "X"". Hot Vidéo magazine (in French). France. 1996.
- "1996 AVN Awards Show". Bachelor magazine (in Japanese). Japan. April 1996.
