= New Wave Hookers =

1984 film

- Directed by: Gregory Dark
- Written by: Gregory Dark; Platinum Fire
- Produced by: Gregory Dark; Walter Dark
- Cinematography: Junior "Speedy" Bodden
- Edited by: Jane Waters
- Music by: The Plugz; The Sockets
- Distributed by: VCA Pictures
- Release date: 1985
- Running time: 75 minutes (abridged version)
- Language: English

New Wave Hookers is a 1985 pornographic film that established the alt porn genre. It featured a cast of established performers from the era and was followed by a number of sequels and a remake. The movie starred Ginger Lynn, Desiree Lane, Kristara Barrington, Kimberly Carson, Brooke Fields, Gina Carrera, Jamie Gillis, Jack Baker, Tom Byron, Steve Powers, Peter North, Rick Cassidy, Greg Rome, and Steve Drake. Traci Lords appeared in the original version dressed in all-red lingerie and portrayed "the Devil."

The film was produced by the Dark Brothers, who featured the slogan "Purveyors of Fine Filth." Walter Dark was the executive producer, and Gregory Dark produced, directed, and co-wrote with Platinum Fire.

== Plot ==
The story begins with Jack Baker and Jamie Gillis telling jokes as they watch porn and talk about women. They fantasize how their lives would be better if they were pimps with women working for them. They discuss opening an escort service featuring "new wave bitches" who would become aroused after they hear new wave music. They fall asleep to TV static, and much of the remainder of the film depicts the two men dreaming about different sexual encounters with women who become sexually receptive after listening to new wave.

== Premiere ==
As shown in the documentary Fallen Angels, New Wave Hookers had its world premiere at the Los Angeles Pussycat Theater in 1985. Members of the cast arrived in white limousines. Those in attendance included Gregory Dark, Walter Dark, Kristara Barrington and Traci Lords.

== Controversy ==
The original version was removed from distribution in the United States in 1986 when news broke that Traci Lords was under 18 when the film was made. The movie was subsequently re-edited and reissued with the Lords-Cassidy scene excised and the box cover photo of Lords replaced with co-star Ginger Lynn's image. This altered version is the one that is (legally) available in the United States today.

== Awards ==
The movie won AFAA Erotica Awards in 1986 for Best Erotic Scene, Best Musical Score and Best Trailer. The soundtrack includes the song "Electrify Me" by The Plugz, which won for Best Song. It was also nominated for Best Art and Set Decoration, Best Cinematography, Best Costume Design and Best Advertising Campaign. Also in 1986, New Wave Hookers won the Adam Film World Guide Award for Best Movie and the AVN Award for Best Packaging - Film. New Wave Hookers went on to be included in the XRCO Hall of Fame. In 2001, Adult Video News placed it 17th on its list of the 101 greatest adult videos of all time.

== Sequels ==
- New Wave Hookers 2 won the 1992 AVN Award for "Top Selling Release of the Year."
- New Wave Hookers 3 won the 1993 XRCO Award for "Best Couples Scene" (Crystal Wilder and Rocco Siffredi) and the 1994 AVN Award for "Top Renting Release of the Year" and "Best Group Sex Scene - Film" (Tiffany Million, Lacy Rose, Crystal Wilder, Francesca Le, Rocco Siffredi and John Dough)
- New Wave Hookers 5 won three AVN Awards in 1998 for "Best Art Direction, Video," "Best Special Effects," and "Top Renting Release of the Year."
- New Wave Hookers 6 (2000)
- New Wave Hookers 7 won the 2004 AVN Award for "Best Editing, Video."
- The remake Neu Wave Hookers won the 2007 AVN Award for "Best All Sex Release."

== Scene Breakdown ==
Scene 1	Desiree Lane, Jamie Gillis, Steve Powers
Scene 2	Brooke Fields, Kimberly Carson, Peter North
Scene 3	Ginger Lynn, Steve Powers, Tom Byron
Scene 4	Kristara Barrington, Jack Baker, Steve Powers
Scene 5	Traci Lords, Rick Cassidy
Scene 6	Kristara Barrington, Jamie Gillis, Steve Powers
Scene 7	Desiree Lane, Gina Carrera, Kristara Barrington, Greg Rome, Jack Baker, Jamie Gillis, Steve Drake
