= Adam Film World =

American magazines about pornographic films

- Adam Film World Vol. 6 No. 6, dated August 1977
- Editor: Tim Connelly (as Jeremy Stone)
- Former editors: Edward S. Sullivan, John Zeus
- Categories: Men's magazines
- Frequency: Monthly
- Founded: 1966 (as The Adam Film Quarterly)
- Final issue Number: 1998; Vol. 17 No. 1
- Company: Knight Publishing Corp.
- Country: United States
- Based in: Los Angeles
- Language: English

Adam Film World Guide
- Adam Film World Guide Vol. 21 No. 5, dated July 2008
- Editor-in-Chief: Anthony Petkovich
- Former editors: Tim Connelly (as Jeremy Stone), Edward S. Sullivan
- Categories: Men's magazines
- Frequency: Monthly
- Founded: 1950s
- First issue: May 1981
- Final issue Number: August 2008; Vol. 21, No. 6
- Company: Knight Publishing Corp.
- Country: United States
- Based in: Los Angeles
- Language: English
- ISSN: 0743-6335
- OCLC: 10621205

Adam Film World (AFW) and Adam Film World Guide (AFWG) were American magazines about pornographic film, starting in 1966 as The Adam Film Quarterly.

== History ==
Knight Publishing Corp. had launched Adam magazine in 1956 as an attempt to follow Playboy's success. Adam Film Quarterly was spun off from that magazine by William Rotsler in 1966 to cover the sexploitation film industry. The first issue's cover price was US$1 and the cover story was about The Notorious Daughter of Fanny Hill, an erotic movie directed by Peter Stootsberry and produced by Bradford Hallworth.

Originally, like Playboy, the publication also covered mainstream films and included feature stories on stars such as Orson Welles or Judy Garland. However, by 1969 it was renamed Adam Film World and issued monthly.

The Internet Adult Film Database owes its start to Peter Van Aarle, who began keeping notes on index cards on adult movies he had seen or were reviewed in Adam Film World starting in 1982.

Adam Film World was called "one of the industry's leading trade publications" in 1994 by the Associated Press.

In his 2001 book Pornography and Sexual Representation, Joseph Slade states, "Extremely valuable are the reports, reviews and gossip of Adam Film World and Adult Video Guide, the oldest American monthly devoted to explicit cinema and generally more reliable than similar magazines, though the information on actors and actresses should be approached with caution. Best described as a fan magazine, Adam Film World hypes the careers of performers for a credulous audience, but partly for that reason it is unparalleled as a guide to the mores and customs of the porn subculture." Slade pointed out that the magazine's interviews with performers were, to an extent, similar to celebrity interviews in popular mainstream magazines: "Actors and actresses usually begin by talking about their parents, their adolescence, their own children, lovers, the importance of grooming, then move on to discussions of augmented breasts, relative penis sizes, favorite costars and directors, referred techniques of oral, vaginal, or anal sex, striptease dancing on tour as a sideline and—most important—their fan clubs or their 900-telephone numbers."

The publication is also notable for having issued the first movie awards for excellence in pornographic film, first with the X-Caliber Awards in 1975, then replacing them with the AFWG awards starting in 1981 when its sister publication, Adam Film World Guide, was launched. Today the role of adult film awards has been mostly supplanted by Adult Video News, with its AVN Awards, which launched a decade later.

Adam Film World Guide, in turn, spawned an annual Directory of Adult Films starting in 1984. The annuals were "important directories of...hard-core films and videos of the previous eighteen months, with lists of notable films of the past, capsule reviews that rate eroticism from 'warm' to 'volcanic,' addresses of distributors and retail outlets, brief biographies of actors, directors, and producers and indexes by theme, director, and performer."

Edward S. Sullivan was the first editor of Adam Film World, followed briefly in 1984 by John Zeus, while former pornographic film actor Tim Connelly was editor, under the name Jeremy Stone, from 1985 to 2003. Connelly, as Stone, was inducted into the X-Rated Critics Organization Hall of Fame in the Fifth Estate category in 1998.

Knight Publishing eventually expanded to add several other magazine titles such as Adam Black Video Illustrated, Adam Gay Video, and Cinema X Monthly and several others, but Adam Film World remained the flagship of the group until it was discontinued in the late 1990s in favour of Adam Film World Guide. By 2008, owner Bentley Morriss put the company up for sale. When a buyer was not found, the magazine empire folded.

== X-Caliber Awards ==
The Adam Film World annual X-Caliber Awards based their selection of winners "largely on the votes of readers who are members of the audiences of the adult theaters." although after the popular vote is counted, "an editorial panel makes the final selections". The winners were announced annually starting with the August 1976 issue for films released the previous year. By the second year, the Z-Caliber Awards, for the worst movies, were also introduced.

	1976	1977	1978
Best Sex-Rated Full-Length Feature Film	Private Afternoons of Pamela Mann	The Opening of Misty Beethoven	Desires Within Young Girls
Best Foreign Sexplicit Film	Sensations (Dutch)	Diversions (British)	Butterflies (German-American)
Best Performance by an Adult Film Actress (The Pornelope Award)	Annette Haven for China Girl	Constance Money for The Opening of Misty Beethoven	Jennifer Welles for Little Orphan Sammy
Best Performance by an Adult Film Actor (The Lucky Pierre Award)	John C. Holmes for All Night Long	Jamie Gillis for The Opening of Misty Beethoven	John C. Holmes for Eruption
Best Supporting Actress (The Knockers-Up Award)	Sharon Thorpe for Tapestry of Passion	Vicki Lyon (actually co-starred) for Portrait of Seduction	Jewell Bright for China De Sade
Best Supporting Actor (The Gung-Ho Award)	Harry Reems for Spikey's Magic Wand	Jeffrey Stern (aka Jon Martin) for Portrait of Seduction	Seth Wagner for Foxy Lady
Best Miscegenation (Interracial) Sex Scene (The Zebra Award)	Brigitte Maier for Tongue	Kristine DeBell for Alice in Wonderland	Valerie Driskill and Seth Wagner for Foxy Lady
Best Adult Film Screenplay (The Fantasia Award)	The staff of Newsday for Naked Came the Stranger	Jake Barnes for The Opening of Misty Beethoven	John Ashley for Eruption
Best Directed Adult Film (The Canvas Chair Award)	Alan Bruce Colberg for All Night Long	Henry Paris for The Opening of Misty Beethoven	Lin Chao for Oriental Blue
Best Sinamatography (The Crotch Zoom Award)	Franklin de Ceco for All Night Long	Joe Bardo for Alice in Wonderland	Robert Michael for V—The Hot One
Best Sexaphonic Soundtrack (The Pussy Platter Award)	The Moog synthesizer for Spikey's Magic Wand	Bucky Searles for Alice in Wonderland	Gino Franconi, composer and conductor, for Sex Wish
Biggest Penis on Sex Screen^{1} (The Hunga Din Award)	Dr. Infinity in Every Inch a Lady for autofellatio	John C. Holmes for The Autobiography of a Flea	John C. Holmes for Eruption
Most Hirsute Vagina on the Adult Film Scene^{1} (The Bearded Clam Award)	Terri Hall in The Story of Joanna	Annette Haven in The Autobiography of a Flea	Mimi Zuber in The Jade Pussycat (Special extra award to Jennifer Welles for use of hair dye in Little Orphan Sammy)
The Dirtiest Old Man Who Can Still Get It Up (The Altekocker Award)	Lord Wetherby in Sensations	Robert Cole in Portrait of Seduction	William Paulson in The Other Side of Julie
Best Female Orgasm Scene (The Juicy Lucy Award)	Nina Fause in Sexual Ecstasy of the Macumba	Amber Hunt in Cry for Cindy	Annette Haven for V—The Hot One
Most Cum-Shots in One Film (The Jisming Jerry Award)	Marc Stevens for Every Inch a Lady	Zepedy Colt for Sex Wish	John C. Holmes for Eruption
Largest Breasts on the Sex Screen^{1}	Uschi Digart in The Last Days of Pompeii	Rene Bond in Do You Wanna Be Loved?	Liz Renay in Deep Roots
Best Fellator on the Screen^{1} (The Living Doll Award)	Georgina Spelvin in Sleepyhead	Jennifer Welles in Blonde Velvet	Lesllie Bovee in Eruption
Greatest Contribution to Sexplicit Flicks (The Ovid Award)	Vince Miranda, president of Pussycat Theaters and founder of the Adult Film Association of America, for promoting and legitimizing adult films	Linda Lovelace, actress, for pioneering adult films with Deep Throat	Ann Myers Perry for promoting and improving adult films as president of the AFAA; Jimmy Johnson, executive vice-president of Pussycat Theaters, for legal efforts and; Joel Sussman, for production-still photography.

=== Z-Caliber Awards ===
	1976	1977	1978
Worst All-Around Sexplicit Film^{1}	Not awarded	Playtime Productions for Judgement Day	Desperate Living, produced and directed by John Waters
Worst Direction (The Empty Director's Chair Award)	Not awarded	Not announced^{2}	David Stefans for Strangers When They Mate
Worst Adult Screenplay (The Empty Pen Award)	Not awarded	Stanley Woods for Portrait of Seduction ("for one badly written line only")	Lou Campa for Jailbait
Worst Sexplicit Sinematography (The Glued-on Lenscap Award)	Not awarded	Judgement Day^{2}	Cadillac Named Desire
Worst Performance (The Burned-Out Projection Bulb Award)	Not awarded	Mary Monroe in Teenage Hustler	Ronnie Fray in The Velvet Hustle

== Adam Film World Guide Awards ==
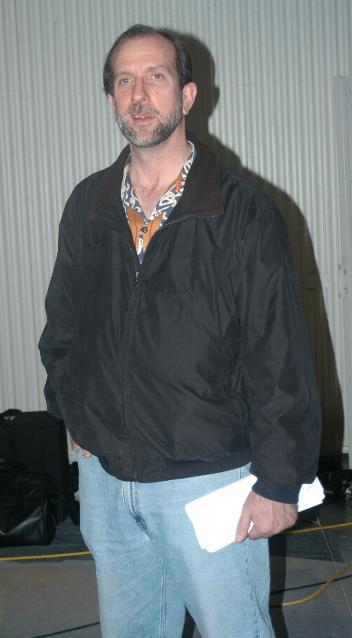
Anthony Petkovich, Editor-in-Chief of Adam Film World Guide on the set of Da Vinci Load from Hustler Video in 2005

In 1981, Adam Film World revived its awards with a new name, the Adam Film World Guide Awards, to coincide with the launch of a sister magazine, Adam Film World Guide. Rather than giving single awards in several categories, AFWG had only a few categories — top films, top videos, top sex scenes, best male and female performers and best director — but named the top five or top 10 of each. Then, until 2003, in the annual AFWG Directory of Adult Films it ranked the top three movies of the year, a combination of movies shot on film and those shot on videotape:

	Year's Best	1st Runner-Up	2nd Runner-Up
1981	Insatiable	Prisoner of Paradise	Talk Dirty to Me
1982	Nothing To Hide	Nightdreams	Blonde Ambition
1983	Society Affairs	Café Flesh	Body Magic
1984	Suzie Superstar	The Young Like It Hot	The Devil In Miss Jones Part II
1985	New Wave Hookers	Every Woman Has a Fantasy	Firestorm
1986	Desperate Women	She's So Fine	Girls on Fire
1987	The Devil in Miss Jones Part III-IV	The Ecstasy Girls Part II	Every Woman Has a Fantasy Part 2
1988	Baby Face 2	Amanda By Night II	Let's Get It On With Amber Lynn
1989	The Nicole Stanton Story Part I	Portrait of an Affair	The Catwoman
1990	Night Trips	The Big Thrill	The Chameleon
1991	Pretty Peaches 3	Buttman's Ultimate Workout	Nightdreams 2
1992	Wild Goose Chase	Buttman's European Vacation	New Wave Hookers 2
1993	Hidden Obsessions	Buttman vs. Buttwoman	Anything That Moves
1994	Face Dance 1&2	Justine: Nothing to Hide 2	Slave to Love
1995	Michael Ninn's Sex	Dog Walker	Takin' It to the Limit
1996	Borderline	Latex	Kink
1997	Sex Freaks	Buttman in the Crack	Shocking Truth
1998	Bad Wives	Red Vibe Diaries	The Psychosexuals
1999	Mobster's Wife	The Masseuse 3	Café Flesh 2
2000	The Awakening	Seven Deadly Sins	Nothing to Hide 3&4
2001	Les Vampyres	Jekyll & Hyde	In the Days of Whore
2002	Fade to Black	Euphoria^{3}	Taboo 2001^{3}
2003	The Fashionistas	The Ass Collector	Big Bottom Sadie

Starting with the 2002 awards, Adam Film World Guide changed the focus of the annual awards. Rather than naming the top 10 films and top 10 videos (which the Directory then condensed into a list of the year's top three movies), AFWG just named one top film, one top video and 51 other awards to movies and individuals for a wide range of categories such as Best Asian Starlet, Best Fetish Vignette Movie, Best Couples Movie, Best Gonzo Comedy, Best Music, Best Box Cover Art and Best All-Girl Orgy Series.

With movies shot on film and videotape giving way to digital, the Best Films and Best Videos categories were eventually combined into Best Movie, and so in 2005, Adam Film World Guide Directory stopped naming the previous year's top three movies, thereafter just reprinting the entire list of AFWG individual awards. The final awards, for movies released in 2007, were published in the July 2008 issue of Adam Film World Guide.

=== 2002–08 ===
	Best Movie	Best Director	Best Actor	Best Actress	Best Screenplay
2002	Fade To Black (Vivid Entertainment) (Best Film); Euphoria (Wicked Pictures) (Best Video)	Paul Thomas, Fade To Black (Film); Brad Armstrong, Euphoria (Video)	Randy Spears, Bad Wives 2 (Vivid) (Film); Steven St. Croix, Planet Of The Babes (Sterling Pictures) (Video)	Taylor Hayes, Fade To Black (Film); Sydnee Steele, Euphoria (Video)	Michael Raven & David Aaron Clark, Beast (Sin City Films) (Film); David Aaron Clark & Brad Armstrong, Euphoria (Video)
2003	The Fashionistas (Evil Angel) (Best Film); The Ass Collector (Evil Angel) (Best Video)	John Stagliano, The Fashionistas (Film); Michael Ninn, Perfect (Private Media) (Video)	Brad Armstrong, Falling From Grace (Wicked Pictures) (Film); Kris Knight, The Ass Collector (Video)	Taylor St. Claire, The Fashionistas (Film); Ashlyn Gere, Crime & Passion (VCA Pictures) (Video)	Daniel Metcalf & Brad Armstrong, Falling From Grace (Film); Patrick Collins and Parker Schurman, Big Bottom Sadie (Elegant Angel) (Video)
2004	Compulsion (Elegant Angel) (Best Film); New Wave Hookers 7 (VCA) (Best Video)	Axel Braun, Compulsion (Film); Thomas Zupko, Opera (Elegant Angel) (Video)	Kurt Lockwood, Compulsion (Film); Tyce Bune, Acid Dreams (Private) (Video)	Ashley Long, Compulsion (Film); Ashley Blue, Girlvert 4 (JM Productions) (Video)	Axel Braun, Compulsion (Film); Thomas Zupko, Opera (Elegant Angel) (Video)
2005	Café Flesh 3 (VCA)	Antonio Passolini, Café Flesh 3	Justin Sterling, The Masseuse (Vivid)	Jenna Jameson, The Masseuse	Brad Armstrong, The Collector (Wicked)
2006	Pirates (Adam & Eve/Digital Playground)	Paul Thomas, The New Devil In Miss Jones (Vivid)	Steven St. Croix, The Prisoner (Metro)	Penny Flame, Darkside (Red Light District Video)	James Avalon, Darkside
2007	Corruption (SexZ Pictures)	Eli Cross, Corruption	Steven St. Croix, Wonderland (Metro)	Sunny Lane, Sex Pix (Red Light District)	Eli Cross & Alvin Edwards, Corruption
2008	Upload (Sex-Z Pictures)	Eli Cross, Upload	Randy Spears, Black Widow (Wicked)	Stormy Daniels, Operation Desert Stormy (Wicked)	Brad Armstrong, Coming Home (Wicked)

== Adam Black Video Top 25 ==
Adam Black Video Directory was an annual publication produced from 1998 to 2007, which grew out of Adam Black Video Illustrated.

In the late 1990s Adam Black Video Directory decided the time had come to honor a list of the best black and interracial movies of all time, because there had been few awards given for them in the past. Adding a few new ones each year, by 2000 the list had grown to a top 25, with a tie for 6th place (shown with year of release in brackets): 1. Black Throat (1985), 2. Maverdick (1995), 3. Let Me Tell Ya 'bout White Chicks (1984), 4. Nasty Video Magazine 5 (1999), 5. Friend to the Black Man (1998), 6. Harlem Candy (1987), 6. N.B.A. (Nuttin' But Ass) (1996), 7. The Look 2000 (1997), 8. The Legend of Reggie D (1989), 9. The Adventures of Dick Black the Black Dick (1987), 10. Pussyman 7 (1994), 11. Starbangers 2 (1994), 12. Escape to Pleasure Island (1998), 13. My Black Ass (1997), 14. Booty Bitch (1995), 15. African Angels (1996), 16. Hot Rod Honeyz, 17. Black Butt Jungle (1998), 18. Kink World (1993), 19. Mac' In 2 (1996), 20. Centerfold (1997), 21. Dear John (1993), 22. Buttman Back in Rio 4, 23. The Dream Team (1996), 24. Isis Blublue filme (1998) and 25. Bomb Ass Pussy (1998).

== Adam Gay Video "Dave" Awards ==
Originated in 1989 by Adam Gay Video Directory editor Dave Kinnick, The "Dave" Awards were originally announced in Kinnick's monthly "Video Review" column in Advocate Men Magazine. They moved to Adam Gay Video 1996 Directory after the column ceased in December 1994.

== Notes ==
^1Some of the terminology used by Adam Film World for some of the awards was deleted or replaced by something less vulgar in these instances.

^2In announcing the Z-Caliber Awards in 1977, Adam Film World did not give Worst Direction or Worst Sinematography Awards, saying "We had a couple more Z-Calibers in mind but have deleted them just to be nice—also the contenders were running neck-and-neck." In announcing the 1978 awards, the previous year's awards were also noted and this time a Worst Sinematography Award for 1977 was named, but the Worst Direction for that year was "withheld by request".

^3The 2002 Adam Film World Guide Directory listed Marissa as first runner-up and Beast as second runner-up, however, this was changed to Euphoria and Taboo 2001 in subsequent directories. It is likely Marissa and Beast were the incorrect entries because Euphoria was named best video that year and since all four movies were shot-on-video productions, it would be the most likely to make the top three movies list overall.
