= Black Throat =

1985 film

- DVD cover
- Directed by: Gregory Dark
- Written by: Johnny Jump-Up
- Produced by: Gregory Dark; Walter Dark
- Cinematography: Junior "Speedy" Bodden
- Edited by: Alex Craig
- Distributed by: VCA Pictures
- Release date: 1985
- Running time: 66 minutes (original uncut length)

Black Throat is a 1985 interracial pornographic film directed by one-half of the Dark Brothers "purveyors of fine filth" team, Gregory Dark. It stars Peter North, Christy Canyon, Sahara, Craig Roberts, Purple Passion, Tony Martino, Kevin James, Erica Boyer, Marc Wallice, Lady Stephanie, and Steve Drake. Jack Baker stars in a non-sex role.

Traci Lords had the original "starring" credit in Black Throat, but her two scenes were removed when investigators discovered that she was underage at time of filming. Although her scenes were removed, her name remains in the theme music used at the start and end of the film.

Black Throat was recognized as XRCO Best Video of the Year in 1985. In 2005, it was inducted into the XRCO Hall of Fame.

== Plot ==
The story begins with Tony Martino looking for food in the garbage. He talks to his friend Mr. Bob, a character representing a rat. He finds a card, which confuses Tony as he does not know what fellatio is. The rat calls for Debbie to show him. This is the scene where Traci Lords would normally come in. Instead, in the new version of the movie the search for Madame Mambo begins with the help of the pimp Jack Baker. He believes that Madam Mambo can help Tony. In their quest they are visiting various venues and watching people engaging in sexual intercourse, who are not always helpful. After watching Dominatrix Christy Canyon having an intense sex scene with slave Peter North, they finally manage to find Sahara, who is Madame Mambo and carries out intercourse with several people.

== Scene breakdown ==
Scene 1	Traci Lords, Tony Martino
Scene 2	Lady Stephanie, Purple Passion, Kevin James
Scene 3	Erica Boyer, Marc Wallice, Steve Powers
Scene 4	Traci Lords, Craig Roberts, Kevin James
Scene 5	Christy Canyon, Peter North
Scene 6	Sahara, Marc Wallice, Steve Powers, Tony Martino
Scene 7	Peter North
Scene 8	Jack Baker
