= Tawny Peaks =

American erotic dancer and adult model (born 1970)

- Born: May 10, 1970 (age 56); New York, New York, U.S.
- Occupation: Pornographic actress
- Height: 5 ft 0 in (1.52 m)

Tawny Peaks (born May 10, 1970) is a retired pornographic actress.

In 1998, Peaks won an arbitrated case against a Florida physical therapist who had sued her, claiming he suffered from whiplash because she swung her breasts (the size of which was variously reported at the time as 60HHH and 69HH) into his face while dancing at a club his friends had taken him to for his bachelor party. The case went on television to The People's Court where former New York City Mayor Ed Koch was the arbiter. After having Peaks appraised by a female bailiff, Koch ruled in favor of Peaks, saying that the breasts were not dangerous.

She retired in 1999, and subsequently had her implants removed, auctioning them on eBay. One of the implants was bought by the Internet casino company GoldenPalace.com for $16,766US.

== Filmography ==
- Big Busted Goddesses of Las Vegas (2000) (V) with Colt 45, Brittany Love, Tawny Peaks, Sierra, Stormy Waters, Echo Valley
- Let's Talk About Sex (1998)
- Voluptuous Vixens II (1998)
- On Location in Fantasy Island (1997)
- Adult Video News Awards 1996 (1996)
- Tit to Tit 5 (1996)
- Breasts (1996) Documentary. Plot Summary: Twenty-two women (ranging in age from 11 to 84), with 41 breasts, talk about their breasts; most are topless as they speak ...
- Girls Around the World 27 (1995)
- Girls Around the World 28 (1995)
- Boob Cruise '94 (1994)
- Big Busty 47 (1992)
