= Brittany O'Connell =

American actress

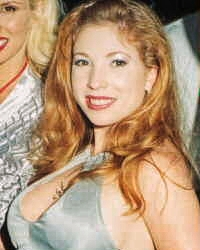
- Born: December 6, 1972 (age 53); Panorama City, California, U.S.
- Occupation: Pornographic actress
- Years active: 1992–2011
- Height: 5 ft 4 in (1.63 m)

Brittany O'Connell (born December 6, 1972) is an American former pornographic actress.

== Career ==
She debuted in adult movies in 1992. She retired from doing adult films at the end of the 1990s and came back again in 2008. In between her stints in adult movies, she produced VHS movies for "Brittany O’Connell Productions", moved to Phoenix in 2001, did cam shows for her own website, and got new breast implants. Her first comeback performance was in the movie Dirty Rotten Motherfuckers 2 in July 2008. O'Connell also has had a bit part on the FX TV show Sons of Anarchy. O'Connell co-authored and appeared in a comic book, published by Carnal Comics, that was part autobiography.

O'Connell created her own website (brittanyoconnell.com) in November 1997, which was licensed to Brittany O'Connell Enterprizes, where she offered online live shows, exclusive movies, and photos with other adult film actresses such as Alyssa Raven & Rachel Warren and other amateur actresses. She closed her website in April 2010.

== Awards and nominations (partial listing) ==
- 2009 XRCO Award nominee - Best Cumback
- 2010 XBIZ Award nominee – Acting Performance of the Year, Female (Not Married With Children XXX - X-Play/LFP)
- 2010 AVN Award nominee – Best Oral Sex Scene (Face Full of Diesel 6 - Digital Sin)
- 2010 AVN Award nominee – Best Supporting Actress (Not Married With Children XXX - X-Play/LFP)
