= Steven St. Croix =

American pornographic actor (born 1968)

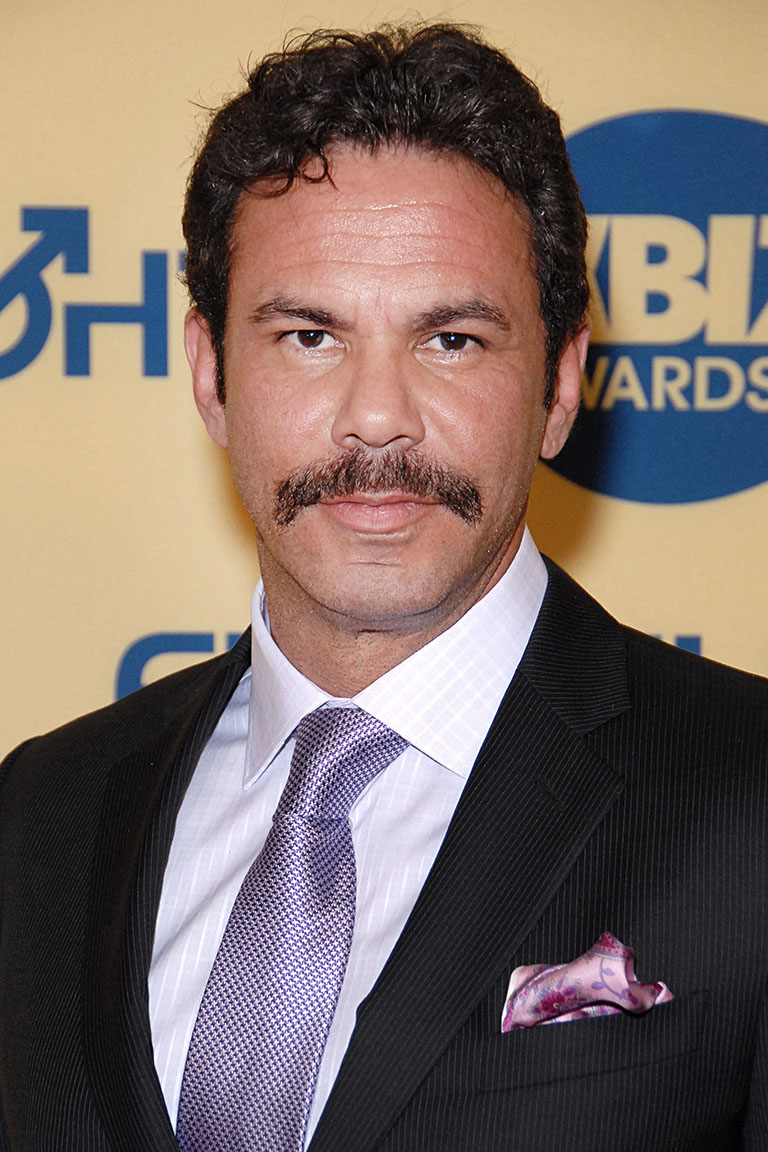
- St. Croix at the 2013 XBIZ Awards
- Born: Ben Banks; February 24, 1968 (age 58); Ames, Iowa, United States
- Years active: 1991-2022
- Height: 6 ft 3 in (1.91 m)
- Political party: Libertarian

Steven St. Croix (born Ben Banks; February 24, 1968) is an American pornographic actor and director. In 2013, he received a NightMoves Lifetime Achievement Award. St. Croix has made several mainstream appearances, including a music video for Gloria Estefan and the 2004 film The Girl Next Door.

== Early life ==
St. Croix was born in Connecticut. Raised as a Jehovah's Witness, he grew up in a "very religious, strict" household. At 18, he had his first sexual experience. St. Croix attended vocational school to become a mason. He also worked in telemarketing and adult video sales prior to his porn career.

== Career ==
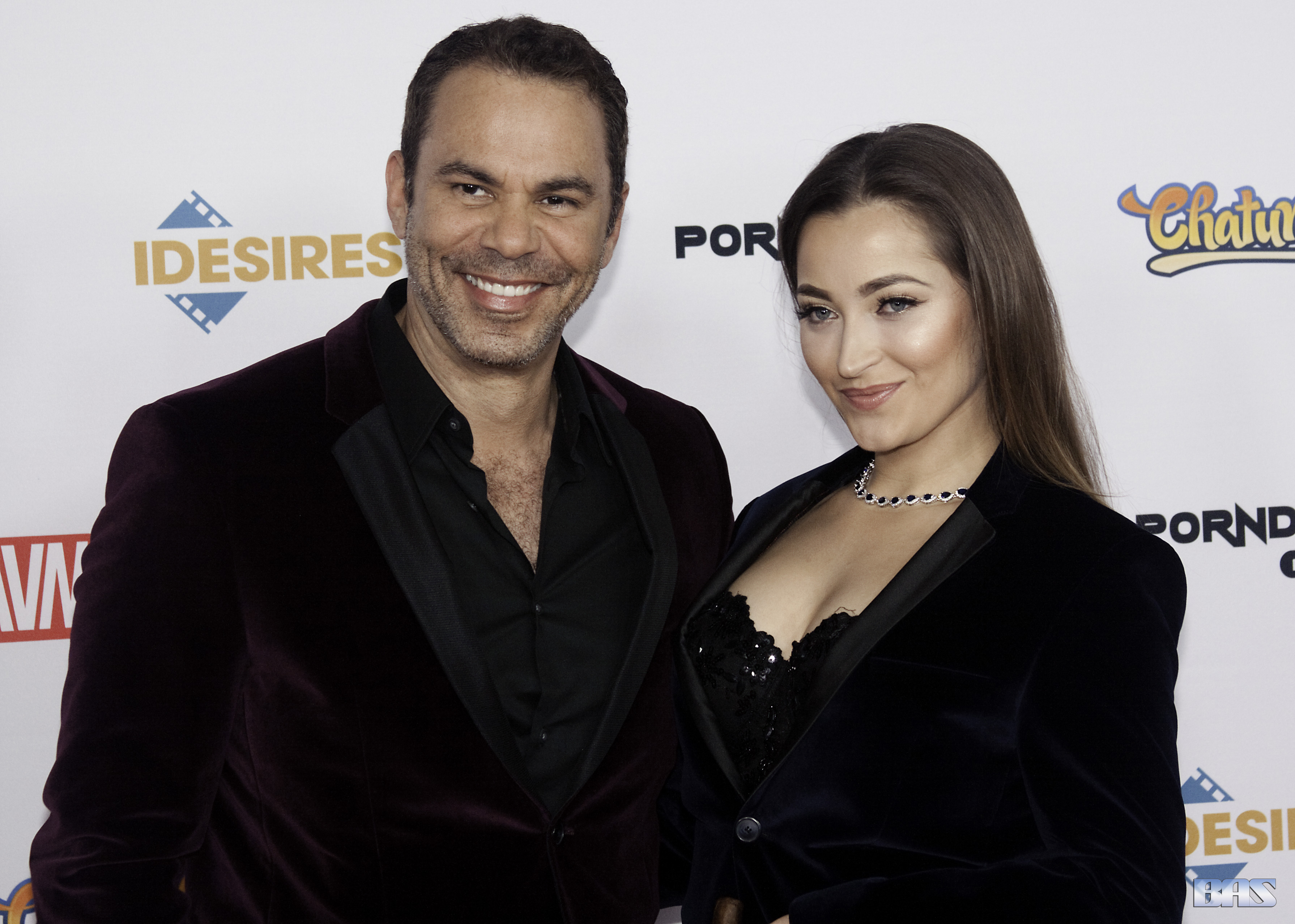
St. Croix with Dani Daniels at the 2016 AVN Awards

St. Croix entered the adult film industry as a production assistant in December 1992. While working on the film Deep Throat 6, he performed in his first scene after an actor failed to show up. In 1995, St. Croix became the first male performer to sign an exclusive contract with Los Angeles–based studio Vivid Entertainment.

St. Croix first left the industry in the late 1990s to pursue mainstream acting. During this time, he took classes under an acting coach and learned improv from the comedy troupe Groundlings. He also body doubled for Brian Bosworth, was an extra on Baywatch, and danced in music videos for Gloria Estefan and Jon Secada. After struggling to pay his bills, he returned to acting in pornographic films.

In 2005, he was inducted into the AVN Hall of Fame. St. Croix left the adult film industry again in late 2010, only to return in early 2012. In February 2013, he published an e-book titled Porn Star: Everything You Want to Know and Are Embarrassed to Ask.

=== Advocacy ===
St. Croix has spoken out against Measure B, a law that requires the use of condoms in all vaginal and anal scenes filmed in Los Angeles County. He urged his fans to spread his NoToMeasureB public service announcements on social media on October 16, 2012. Later that month, he received the Positive Image Award from the Free Speech Coalition for his work to "dispel the myths and misconceptions of the adult entertainment industry." In April 2013, St. Croix appeared alongside former pornographic actor Danny Wylde on a HuffPost Live panel to debate Measure B.

== Personal life ==
While away from the adult film industry, St. Croix lived in Cannes, France, and ran a small art gallery. He is an avid painter, primarily creating large-format acrylics. His work is heavily inspired by the expressionist movement. St. Croix describes his political views as "Libertarian with Republican business leanings."

== Select performances ==
Year	Title	Role	Notes	Ref.
1997	Ed & Red's Night Party	Himself	1 episode	
2001	Moby Presents: Alien Sex Party	Santa	Cameo	
2004	The Girl Next Door	Karate Guy in Porn Film	Credited as Benjamin Banks	
2005	Pirates	Marco		
2008	Pirates II: Stagnetti's Revenge	Marco		
2015	Wanted	Sheriff Clayton		

== Awards ==
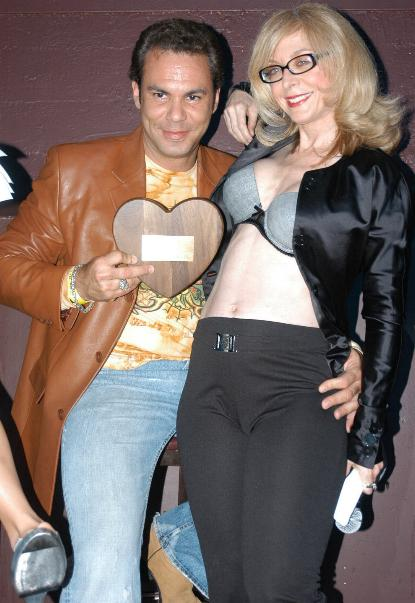
St. Croix with Nina Hartley at the 2007 XRCO Awards

List of accolades received by Steven St. Croix
Awards and honors
Award	Won	Honored
AVN Awards	12	1
NightMoves Awards	3	1
XBIZ Awards	4	0
XRCO Awards	4	1
FSC Awards	1	0
Adam Film World Guide Awards	3	0
XCritic Awards	1	0
- Total number of wins and honors
Totals	28	3

AVN Awards
Year	Result	Category	Nominated work
1994	Won	Best Group Sex Scene, Video	A Blaze of Glory
1995	Won	Best Actor, Video	Chinatown
1995	Won	Best Couples Sex Scene, Film	Dog Walker
1996	Won	Best Supporting Actor, Film	Forever Young
1997	Won	Best Group Sex Scene, Film	The Show
1998	Won	Best Actor, Film	Bad Wives
1998	Won	Best Anal Sex Scene, Film	Bad Wives
2004	Won	Best Supporting Actor, Film	Looking In
2004	Won	Best Group Sex Scene, Film	Looking In
2005	Honored	AVN Hall of Fame Inductee	—N/a
2013	Won	Best Actor	Torn
2015	Won	Best Actor	Wetwork
2016	Won	Best Supporting Actor	Peter Pan XXX - An Axel Braun Parody

XRCO Awards
Year	Result	Category	Nominated work
1994	Won	Best Actor, Single Performance	Dog Walker
2007	Honored	XRCO Hall of Fame Inductee	—N/a
2013	Won	Best Actor	Torn
2013	Won	Best Cumback	—N/a
2015	Won	Best Actor	Wetwork

NightMoves Awards
Year	Result	Category
1995	Won	Best Actor
2004	Won	Best Actor (Editor's Choice)
2013	Honored	NightMoves Lifetime Achievement Award
2015	Won	Best Male Performer (Editor's Choice)

FSC Awards
Year	Result	Category
2012	Won	Positive Image Award

Adam Film World Guide Awards
Year	Result	Category	Nominated work
2002	Won	Best Actor	Planet of the Babes
2006	Won	Actor of the Year	The Prisoner
2007	Won	Actor of the Year	Wonderland

XCritic Awards
Year	Result	Category	Nominated work
2015	Won	Best Actor, Feature Movie	Wetwork

XBIZ Awards
Year	Result	Category	Nominated work
2013	Won	Performer Comeback of the Year	—N/a
2013	Won	Best Actor, Feature Movie	Torn
2015	Won	Best Actor, Feature Movie	Wetwork
2016	Won	Best Actor	Wanted

== Bibliography ==
- Porn Star: Everything You Want To Know And Are Embarrassed To Ask. Self-published, 2014
- The New Century Man: Reclaim Your Life and Live Your Freedom. Self-published, 2016
