= Vince Vouyer =

American pornographic actor

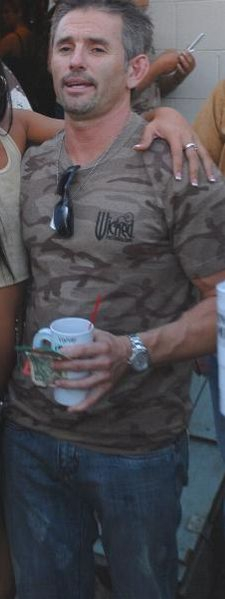
- Vouyer at a Wicked Pictures party, September 2007
- Born: John Albert Laforme; June 1, 1966 (age 59); Lowell, Massachusetts, U.S.
- Height: 5 ft 7 1/2 in (1.71 m)
- Website: Official website

Vince Vouyer is a pornographic film actor and director. He is sometimes credited as Vince, Vince Voyeur, Vince Voyer, or Vince Voyuer.

Breakin' 'Em In #9, in which Vouyer starred, won the AVN Award for Best Pro-Am Release at the 24th Annual AVN Awards Show, hosted by Jessica Drake at the Mandalay Bay Events Center in Las Vegas. The movie also earned Best Anal Sex Scene, Video for Vouyer and Amy Ried.

== Awards and nominations ==
- 1997 AVN Awards – Best Couples Sex Scene (Conquest) with Jenna Jameson
- 1997 AVN Awards – Male Performer of the Year
- 1997 AVN Awards – Best Actor (Video)
- 1997 Hot d'Or Award winner – American Best Actor
- 1997 AVN Award – Most Outrageous Sex Scene (Shock) with Shayla LaVeaux & T.T. Boy
- 1997 AVN Award – Best Group Sex Scene (The Show) with Christy Canyon, Tony Tedeschi & Steven St. Croix
- 2007 AVN Award winner – Best Anal Sex Scene, Video (Breakin’ ‘Em In 9 – Vouyer Media) with Amy Ried

== TV guest appearances ==
- The Tera Patrick Show as himself (March 13, 2001)
