= Johnny Rey =

American actor and model (1963–2006)

- Born: Rhett Elliot Pamer; November 13, 1963; Riverside County, California, U.S.
- Died: January 18, 2006 (aged 42); Pomona, California, U.S.
- Other names: Johnny Ray; The Ed Wood of Gay Porn
- Occupations: Actor; Model; Director; Columnist
- Years active: 1990–2006
- Agent: Falcon Studios

Johnny Rey (November 13, 1963 – January 18, 2006), born Rhett Elliott Palmer, was an American adult film actor, director, columnist, and early internet entrepreneur. He was a prominent and highly influential figure in the gay adult entertainment industry during the 1990s. Celebrated for his distinct aesthetics and camp cinematic style, he earned the industry nickname "The Ed Wood of Gay Porn". Beyond his filmmaking, Rey was an early pioneer of adult web-cam streaming and a dedicated HIV/AIDS activist within the West Hollywood LGBTQ+ community.

== Early life and modeling career ==
Rhett Elliott Palmer was born on November 13, 1963, in Riverside County, California. His early childhood was marked by severe instability; his biological mother chose not to raise him and placed him into the foster care system. He did not meet his biological father until the age of nine, after which he suffered severe physical abuse.

As a young adult, Palmer relocated to Palm Springs, California, where he found stability working professionally as a hairdresser. Blessed with a striking physical appearance—characterized by his blond hair, hazel eyes, and a lean, muscular "swimmer's build"—he began taking on print modeling work. During the late 1980s and early 1990s, he appeared frequently in mainstream gay lifestyle magazines and adult erotic publications, establishing a recognizable public profile before transitioning into film.

== Adult film career ==
=== On-screen debut (1993) ===
While living in Palm Springs, a close friend suggested Palmer pursue a career in adult cinema. Shortly after expressing open interest in the field, legendary adult film director Chi Chi LaRue reached out to him. LaRue was in Palm Springs filming her iconic 1993 feature Mirage and cast Palmer on the spot, handing him his debut under the stage name Johnny Rey.

Rey quickly became a highly sought-after performer due to his physical appeal and natural screen presence. Over his acting career, he accumulated roughly 40 to 42 acting credits across major adult studios of the era, including Falcon Studios, Catalina Video, VCA Pictures, HIS Video, Odyssey, and Jocks Studio. His performance in the 1993 adult film Romeo & Julian: A Love Story cemented his star status, earning him critical acclaim within the adult entertainment press.

=== Directing and "The Ed Wood of Gay Porn" ===
Rey's true passion lay behind the camera. Within three years of his debut, he transitioned from acting to full-time directing. As a filmmaker, Rey rejected standard, formulaic adult productions in favor of high-concept, theatrical, and low-budget spectacles. He specialized in grand parodies, sci-fi epics, and historical themes, utilizing highly stylized costumes, elaborate sets, and over-the-top camp humor.

Because of his relentless creative ambition contrasted against low-budget production realities, peers and critics dubbed him "The Ed Wood of Gay Porn"—a title Rey proudly embraced. His directorial efforts included Score of Sex (1995), The Island of Dr. Porneaux (1996), and the Babes Ballin' Boys series (1998). The visual ambition of his features was credited by adult trade publications with influencing the creation of dedicated "Best Art Direction" categories at adult award ceremonies.

=== Technological innovations ===
Rey was an aggressive early adopter of internet technology for adult performers. In the mid-to-late 1990s, he became one of the first adult stars to launch a dedicated, personal subscription website. He pioneered the use of home webcams for live interactive streaming, setting a baseline model for performer self-promotion and digital independence that would later define the modern adult web industry.

=== Media, community, and activism ===
Rey was a central pillar of the Southern California gay community and adult industry social circles. He penned a popular monthly advice and media gossip column titled "Ask Johnny" for the regional LGBTQ+ publication Urge magazine.

He leveraged his celebrity status to champion HIV/AIDS fundraising and community support during the height of the crisis. He was the original creator and host of Cocktails With the Stars at the prominent West Hollywood nightclub Micky's, a regular event that brought mainstream fans and adult performers together to raise money for charity. Additionally, Rey regularly organized and played in community Porn Star Baseball Games and hosted numerous regional benefits.

== Illness and death ==
In late 2005, Rey admitted himself to a hospital after experiencing a rapid, severe deterioration of his eyesight. Comprehensive medical screenings revealed that he was suffering from brain lesions and advanced testicular cancer. The clinical workup also revealed that he was HIV-positive, a diagnosis he had been completely unaware of prior to his hospitalization.

Rey died from medical complications related to cancer and AIDS on January 18, 2006, in Pomona, California, at the age of 42. He died at home surrounded by his mother, Marla Hoffman, and his sister, Shelli Rosa. In March 2006, Adult Video News (AVN) published a major appreciation article honoring his legacy as an irreplaceable innovator, flamboyant icon, and community advocate.

== Filmography ==
=== Film ===
Year	Title	Role	Notes
1993	Mirage	Johnny Rey	Debut
1993	Cut vs Uncut: A Competition	Johnny Rey	
1993	Romeo & Julian: A Love Story	Julian	
1993	Cool Moon	Johnny Rey	
1993	Hung Hotel	Johnny Rey	
1993	Men of Color	Johnny Rey	
1993	Pumped	Johnny Rey	
1993	The Hunk Connection	Johnny Rey	
1993	Just You and Me	Johnny Rey	
1993	Fever	Johnny Rey	
1993	Portholes	Johnny Rey	
1994	Midnight Run	Johnny Rey	
1994	Beat Off Frenzy 1	Johnny Rey	
1994	Night Watch 1	Johnny Rey	
1994	Inside Karl Thomas	Johnny Rey	
1994	Bed & Breakfast	Johnny Rey	
1994	Posing Strap	Johnny Rey	
1994	Toilet Tramps	Johnny Rey	
1994	The Male Triangle	Johnny Rey	
1994	Party Line	Johnny Rey	
1994	Scott Randsome is Wanted	Johnny Rey	
1994	G.I. Jocks: Out of the Ranks	Johnny Rey	
1994	Masquerade	Johnny Rey	
1994	Country Buddies 1	Johnny Rey	
1994	Slam Bam, Thank You Man	Johnny Rey	
1994	Hot Reunion	Johnny Rey	
1994	The Big Pick-Up	Johnny Rey	
1994	Bedroom Eyes	Johnny Rey	
1994	Twin Exposure	Johnny Rey	
1994	Frat Bottom Boys 2	Johnny Rey	
1994	At Your Service	Johnny Rey	
1994	Big Sticks	Johnny Rey	
1994	Roundup	Johnny Rey	
1994	Men of Forum 1: Forum Video Magazine	Johnny Rey	
1995	More Than Friends	Johnny Rey	
1995	Never Say Never	Johnny Rey	
1995	Risky Sex	Johnny Rey	
1995	Sex Is in the Air	Johnny Rey	
1995	Gay & Kinky 2	Johnny Rey	
1995	Sex on the Job	Johnny Rey	
1995	Cruising Grounds	Johnny Rey	
1995	While I Was Sleeping	Johnny Rey	
1995	Man Time Stories	Johnny Rey	
1995	Orgy Boys 1	Johnny Rey	
1995	Streets of L.A. 1	Johnny Rey	
1995	A Score of Sex: Johnny Rey's Sex Series 2	Johnny Rey	
1995	Nymphomania	Johnny Rey	
1995	The Matinee Idol	Party Guest	
1995	Streets of L.A. 2	Johnny Rey	
1996	The Island of Dr. Porneaux	Johnny Rey	
1996	Boys from Bel-Air	Neighbor	
1996	Blueline	Johnny Rey	
1996	Ask Johnny Rey	Johnny Rey	
1996	Orgy Boys 2	Johnny Rey	
1996	The Insiders	Johnny Rey	
1996	The Best of Scott Randsome	Johnny Rey	
1996	Met on the Net	Johnny Rey	
1996	Naughty Boys	Johnny Rey	
1996	Lover Boys	Johnny Rey	
1996	Blue Nights	Johnny Rey	
1996	Cum Stories to Tell	Johnny Rey	
1996	Hot Cops 2: This Time the Law's Gone Too Far	Johnny Rey	
1997	Sexcuses	Johnny Rey	
1997	Men 4 Men: On the Net	Johnny Rey	
1997	The Wall 3	Johnny Rey	
1997	Gay Athletes	Johnny Rey	
1997	Unique Gay Positions	Johnny Rey	
1997	Bad Boys	Johnny Rey	
1997	Threesomes	Johnny Rey	
1997	I'm Your Man	Johnny Rey	
1997	Male Practice	Johnny Rey	
1997	Beverly Hills Bondage Club 1	Johnny Rey	
1998	Outdoor Men	Johnny Rey	
1998	Full Release	Johnny Rey	
1998	"O" Is for Orgy	Johnny Rey	
1998	Sticky Buns	Johnny Rey	
1998	Babes Ballin' Boys series	Johnny Rey	
1999	Nude Science	Johnny Rey	
1999	Toilet Tricks: Glory Holes 11	Johnny Rey	
1999	Peep Show 13	Johnny Rey	
1999	Knob Polishers	Johnny Rey	
2000	Hot Blond Bottoms: Glory Holes 22	Johnny Rey	
2000	Bi Now Pay Later	Johnny Rey	
2000	Babes Ballin' Boys 5	Johnny Rey	
2000	Peters	Johnny Rey	
2003	All By Myself	Johnny Rey	
2003	Open Wide	Johnny Rey	
2003	Mail Men	Johnny Rey	
2004	Blonde & Buff	Johnny Rey	
2004	Classic Men Pre-Condom 3	Johnny Rey	
2005	Nordic Dick 2	Johnny Rey	
2006	Smack My Crack	Johnny Rey	
2006	Thank You for Pole Smoking	Johnny Rey	
2006	Your Ass or Mine 3	Johnny Rey	
2006	Face Fuckers 1	Johnny Rey	
2006	Mancandy 3	Johnny Rey	
2008	Best of the 1980s 1	Johnny Rey	Posthumous release
2008	Great Dane Gold Collector's Edition 2	Johnny Rey	Posthumous release

== Awards and nominations ==
Year	Award	Work	Category	Result	Ref
1993	GayVN Awards	Romeo & Julian: A Love Story	Best Actor	Won	
1993	GayVN Awards	Romeo & Julian: A Love Story	Best Sex Scene	Won	
1996	Men in Video Awards	Boys from Bel-Air	Hottest Cocksucker	Won	
