= Mitchell Spinelli =

American pornographic film director and producer

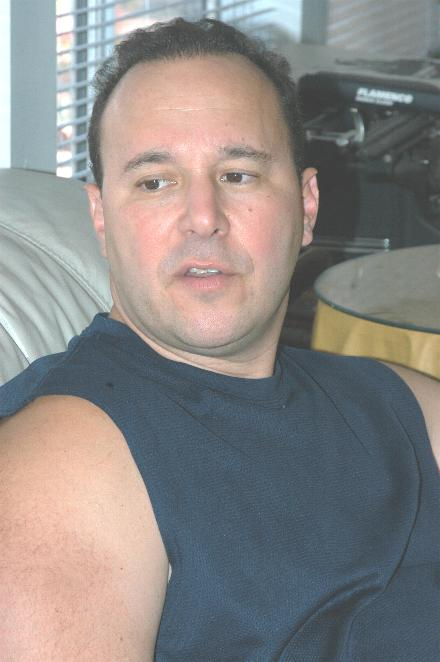
- Spinelli in 2004
- Other name: Mitch Spinelli

Mitchell Spinelli is an American pornographic film director and producer. Son of porn director Anthony Spinelli, he has directed films in series such as White Panty Chronicles, All Natural, and Taped College Confessions.

In 1995, he won the AVN Award for Best Screenplay, Video for The Face. In 2003, he founded the film company Acid Rain Productions, which specializes in gonzo pornography. He has previously owned the company Plum Productions. He is a member of the AVN Hall of Fame.
