= Shayla LaVeaux =

American pornographic actress (born 1969)

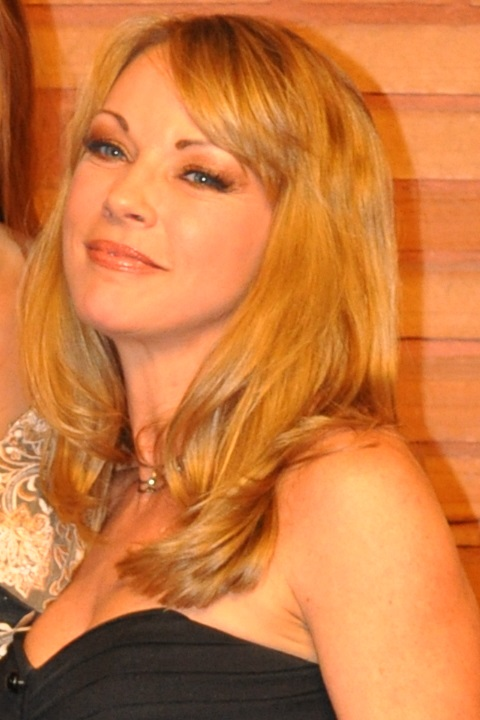
- Shayla LaVeaux at the 2011 AVN Awards show
- Born: December 27, 1969 (age 56); Golden, Colorado, U.S.
- Other names: Shayla La Veaux; Shayla Lavoux; Shayla Le Veaux; Shayla Levaux; Shayla; Shayla Lawrence
- Occupations: Pornographic actress; exotic dancer
- Years active: 1992–2018
- Height: 5 ft 1 in (1.55 m)
- Website: shayla.com

Shayla LaVeaux (born December 27, 1969) is a former American pornographic actress and exotic dancer.

== Early life ==
LaVeaux was born in Golden, Colorado. She graduated from Wheat Ridge High School.

== Career ==
At 18 years old, LaVeaux began stripping at Shotgun Willie's, a topless bar in Glendale, Colorado. She later began dancing at bachelor parties. She started modeling in men's magazines, such as Playboy, Penthouse, and Hustler, in order to build her brand. She began performing in adult films in 1992. Her first scene was with her friend Alexis DeVell, who she had accompanied to the shoot with initially no intention of performing in the scene, but she was asked if she wanted to replace another performer who didn't show up for work. She was a contract performer for director Paul Norman in 1993. She was once under a one-year contract with the studio VCA Pictures as well. LaVeaux has also done voice acting for hentai cartoons.

== Awards ==
- 1994 Adam Film World Award – New Starlet
- 1994 AVN Award – Best New Starlet
- 1994 XRCO Award – New Starlet
- 1997 AVN Award – Most Outrageous Sex Scene – Shock (with T. T. Boy & Vince Vouyer)
- 2001 AVN Hall of Fame
- 2001 Free Speech Coalition Positive Image Award
- 2008 XRCO Hall of Fame
