= Kaitlyn Ashley =

American pornographic film actress

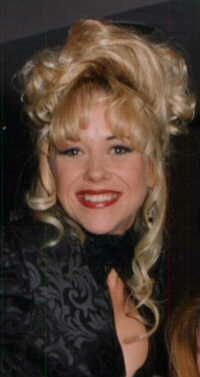
- Occupation: Pornographic film actress
- Years active: 1993–1997
- Spouse: Jay Ashley (?–1997; divorced)

Kaitlyn Ashley is an American former pornographic film actress.

== Career and personal life ==
Ashley was active in adult films from 1993 until her retirement in 1997.

Ashley was married to pornographic film actor Jay Ashley until 1997, when they divorced.

Author Jacob Held argued that Ashley, along with Jill Kelly and Jenna Jameson, is considered to be one of the most iconic adult stars of the 1990s.

== Awards ==
- 1995 AVN Award – Best Supporting Actress—Video (Shame - Vivid)
- 1996 AVN Award – Female Performer of the Year
- 2001 AVN Hall of Fame inductee
