= Debi Diamond =

American adult actress and nude model

- Born: Debbie Lester; May 1, 1965 (age 61); San Fernando Valley, California, U.S.
- Other names: Miss D. D.; Debi; Debbie Diamond; Debbi Diamond; Deborah Diamond; Debi Dymond; Josi Emerson; Debi Hanson; Kaviar; Debbie Lester; Debi Lester; Shelly Rae; Shelley Ray; Shelly Ray; Shelly Rey
- Occupations: Adult actress; nude model
- Height: 5 ft 11 in (1.80 m)
- Children: 3

Debi Diamond (born May 1, 1965) is an American adult actress and nude model.

== Biography ==
She appeared in her first pornographic film in 1983 under the alias of Shelly Rey. The high point of her career was arguably in the early 1990s, when she worked virtually non-stop and her performances garnered many industry awards, including induction into the XRCO and the AVN Halls of Fame.

Debi resurfaced in 2007 on Myspace after nearly 12 years out of the spotlight. In an interview with porn journalist Gene Ross, she said during her absence she had married (but had since divorced) and had three children. She stated she was considering performing in front of the camera again, is launching her own website and will be making her first public appearance since leaving the porn industry at the 2008 AEE Convention signing for PAW/Arrow.

Diamond returned to making porn in December 2008. In early 2009, she began to perform in adult films again according to the website of the model agency representing her, run by fellow porn star Lisa Ann. In 2010, she formed her company called Debi Diamond Films which focuses on femdom content.

== Awards ==
AVN Awards

- 1990 Best Group Sex Scene - Video for Gang Bangs 2
- 1990 Best Couples Sex Scene - Video for The Chameleon
- Hall of Fame
- 1994 Female Performer of the Year
- 1995 Best All-Girl Sex Scene - Film for The Dinner Party
- 1995 Best All-Girl Sex Scene - Video for Buttslammers 4
- 1995 Most Outrageous Sex Scene for Depraved Fantasies
- 1995 Best Group Sex Scene - Film for Sex

F.O.X.E.

- 1995 Female Fan Favorite

XRCO Awards

- 1990 Best Group Sex Scene for Gang Bangs 2
- 1993 Unsung Siren
- 1994 Female Performer of the Year
- 1994 Hall of Fame
- 1995 Best Girl-Girl Sex Scene for The Dinner Party
