= Ashlyn Gere =

American pornographic and TV actress

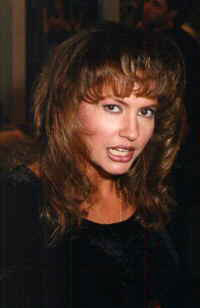
- Gere in 2006
- Education: University of Nevada, Las Vegas
- Occupation: Pornographic film actress

Ashlyn Gere is an American pornographic film actress who has also performed in mainstream film and television, including appearances on the science fiction television series The X-Files and Space: Above and Beyond along with Willard (2003). Gere is an inductee into the AVN and XRCO Halls of Fame.

== Early life ==
Gere graduated from the University of Nevada, Las Vegas with a degree in Theatre Arts and Communications.

== Career ==
In the 1980s, Gere was billed as Kim McKamy in several B movie appearances such as Evil Laugh (1986) and Creepozoids (1987). She also worked as a body double in the films Basic Instinct (1992) and Indecent Proposal (1993).

As a pornographic film actress, Gere was one of the most popular stars of the 1990s, according to Complex. She was nominated for and won several major adult industry awards such as the FOXE, XRCO, and AVN Awards. In the latter half of the 90s, she slowed down on her adult video work and mainly toured as an exotic dancer.

== Awards ==
AVN

- 1993 Best Actress – Film for Chameleons
- 1993 Best Actress – Video for Two Women
- 1993 Best All-Girl Sex Scene – Film for Chameleons (with Deidre Holland)
- 1993 Best Group Scene – Video for Realities 2 (with Marc Wallice and T. T. Boy)
- 1993 Female Performer of the Year
- 1995 Best Actress – Film for The Masseuse 2
- 1995 Best Actress – Video for Body & Soul
- 1995 Best Couples Sex Scene – Video for Body & Soul (with Mike Horner)
- AVN Hall of Fame

FOXE

- 1992 Female Fan Favorite
- 1993 Female Fan Favorite
- 1994 Female Fan Favorite

Hot d'Or Award

- 1995 Best American Actress for The Masseuse 2

XRCO

- 1991 Starlet of the Year
- 1992 Best Actress (Single Performance) for Chameleons: Not the Sequel
- 1992 Best Couples Sex Scene for Chameleons: Not the Sequel (with Rocco Siffredi)
- 1992 Best Girl-Girl Scene for Chameleons: Not the Sequel (with Deidre Holland)
- 1992 Female Performer of the Year
- XRCO Hall of Fame

AFWG

- 2003 Best Actress – Video for Crime & Passion
