= Jim Enright =

American pornographic film director

- Born: November 2, 1954 (age 71); United States
- Occupation: Pornographic film director
- Notable work: Haunted Nights (1994); Hung Frankenstein (2000)

Jim Enright is an American pornographic film director. Inducted into the XRCO Hall of Fame in 2000, he was known for directing films such as Haunted Nights (1994), Hung Frankenstein (2000), and various loose parodies of The Picture of Dorian Gray.

== Awards and nominations ==
- 1994 AVN Award – Best Director, Video (Haunted Nights)
- 2000 XRCO Hall of Fame inductee
