= T. T. Boy =

American pornographic actor (born 1968)

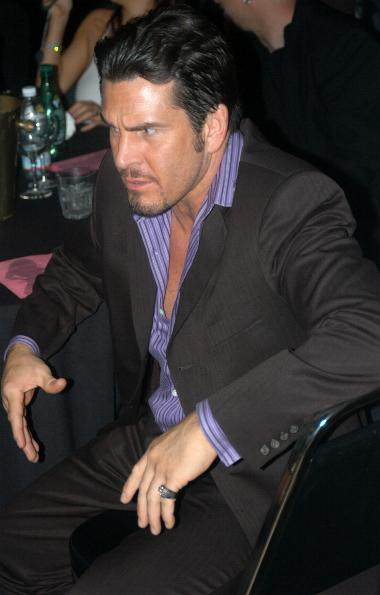
- T. T. Boy in June 2005
- Born: Phillip Troy Rivera; April 30, 1968 (age 58); Puerto Rico
- Height: 5 ft 8 in (1.73 m)
- Website: www.ttboy.com

T. T. Boy (born Phillip Troy Rivera, April 30, 1968) is a Puerto Rican pornographic performer and podcaster. He made his adult video debut in 1988.

He twice won the XRCO Male Performer of the Year award, and was named the 1997 AVN Performer of the Year. In 2000, he was elected to the XRCO Hall of Fame. In 2003, he was inducted into the AVN Hall of Fame.

Within the business, he is known as a performer with superhuman abilities performing in up to 5 scenes a day and appeared in over 3,000 scenes. In a 2015 interview, he stated that over the course of his career, he has had sex with over 10,000 women.

Since 2019, Boy has hosted TT Boy TV, a podcast featuring interviews with current and former porn performers. The show is available on YouTube and Spotify.

== Awards ==
- 1992 - XRCO Woodsman of the year.
- 1992 – Adult Video News Award Best Group Sex Scene – Video (Realities 2, Ashlyn Gere, Marc Wallice and T.T. Boy)
- 1993 – AVN Best Couples Sex Scene – Video (Bikini Beach, Sierra and T.T. Boy)
- 1995 - [Adam Film World] Best Male.
- 1995 – XRCO Best Couples Scene (Seymore and Shane on the Loose!, T.T. Boy and Lana)
- 1996 – AVN Best Couples Sex Scene – Film (Blue Movie, Jenna Jameson and T.T. Boy)
- 1996 – XRCO Male Performer of the Year
- 1996 – XRCO Woodsman of the Year
- 1997 - FOXE Awards Fan Favorite.
- 1997 – XRCO Male Performer of the Year
- 1997 – XRCO Best Anal or D.P. Scene (Car Wash Angels, Careena Collins, T.T. Boy and Tom Byron)
- 1997 – AVN Male Performer of the Year
- 1997 – AVN Most Outrageous Sex Scene (Shock, Shayla LaVeaux, T.T. Boy and Vince Vouyer)
- 1998 - FOXE Awards Fan Favorite
- 1999 - FOXE Awards Fan Favorite
- 1999 – XRCO Best Male-Female Scene (Pink Hotel on Butt Row, T.T. Boy and Elena)
- 1999 - Legends Of Erotica-Silver Anniversary 1972-1999.
- 2000 - FOXE Awards Three Peater
- 2000 – XRCO Hall of Fame inductee
- 2003 – AVN Hall of Fame inductee
- 2004 - Legends Of Erotica Inductee hands in cement ceremony.
- 2009 – Urban X Hall of Fame inductee
- 2020 - Urban X Awards-Industry Pioneer.
