= Steve Drake =

American former pornographic actor and film director (born 1954)

- Born: April 20, 1954 (age 71); New York, US
- Height: 5 ft 9 in (1.75 m)
- Spouse: Dina Deville (m. 1987; div. 1991)

Steve Drake (born April 20, 1954) is a pornographic actor and director. He has performed in over 800 films since the 1980s, and was inducted into the XRCO Hall of Fame in 1999.

== Career ==
In his autobiography, Jerry Butler referred to Drake as "the Tom Selleck of smut", stating that he had a "solid foundation, a skyscraper with a mustache". Jenna Jameson mentioned Drake along with other colleagues when stating that it was "hard not to have intimate feelings about some of the actors I work with... How can you do all this stuff with these guys and then feel nothing for them?"

== Legal issues ==
Drake testified in April, 1987 in San Fernando Municipal Court in a publicized case of two men, Charles Brickman and Thomas Ingalls, charged with felony pandering in the production of sex videotape shot in June 1986. Drake had at the time, along with Stacey Donovan and Tracey Adams, been hired by Cinderella Distributors, which was run by Brickman and Ingalls. Drake testified that having sex "was just part of the description of my character. I did what I did according to the script...I was there as an actor, and part of my job meant having sex". Drake was reportedly paid $300 for his participation in the event. The felony pandering charges were later dropped against Brickman when he agreed to plead no contest in exchange for testifying against Ingalls. He had risked facing a sentence ranging between 3–13 years in prison.
