= 23rd AVN Awards =

2006 American adult industry award ceremony

- 2006 AVN Awards DVD cover art
- Date: January 7, 2006
- Site: The Venetian Las Vegas at Paradise, Nevada, U.S.A.
- Hosted by: Jesse Jane; Greg Fitzsimmons
- Preshow hosts: Jessica Drake; Kirsten Price; Stefani Morgan
- Produced by: Gary Miller
- Directed by: Gary Miller

Highlights
- Best Picture: The Devil in Miss Jones (Best Film)
- Most awards: Pirates (11)
- Most nominations: Pirates (24)

Television coverage
- Network: Playboy TV
- Duration: 2 hours, 29 minutes

The 23rd AVN Awards ceremony, presented by Adult Video News (AVN), honored the best pornographic films of 2005 and took place January 7, 2006 at the Venetian Hotel Grand Ballroom, at Paradise, Nevada, U.S.A. During the ceremony, AVN presented AVN Awards (commonly referred to as Oscars of porn) in 104 categories honoring films released between October 1, 2004, and September 30, 2005. The ceremony, televised in the United States by Playboy TV, was produced and directed by Gary Miller. Comedian Greg Fitzsimmons hosted the show with adult film star Jesse Jane.

The Devil in Miss Jones, a remake of the 1973 classic of the same name, won nine awards including Best Film, but the big winner of the evening was Pirates with 11 awards including Best Video Feature. Other multiple award winners included Camp Cuddly Pines Powertool Massacre and Dark Side with five apiece and Squealer with three. The telecast was subsequently issued on DVD by Spice Studios.

== Winners and nominees ==
The nominees for the 23rd AVN Awards were announced on November 25, 2005, by Adult Video News. Pirates earned the most nominations with 24 total. The Devil in Miss Jones was next with 19, followed by Eternity with 17, Dark Angels 2: Bloodline and Dark Side each with 16 and Catherine with 15.

The winners were announced during the awards ceremony on January 7, 2006. Notably, Pirates set a new record for most awards at one show, edging past Fashionistas, which won 10 in 2003. McKenzie Lee won the coveted Best New Starlet award while Female Performer of the Year was Audrey Hollander. Manuel Ferrara won Male Performer of the Year for the second straight time.

=== Major awards ===
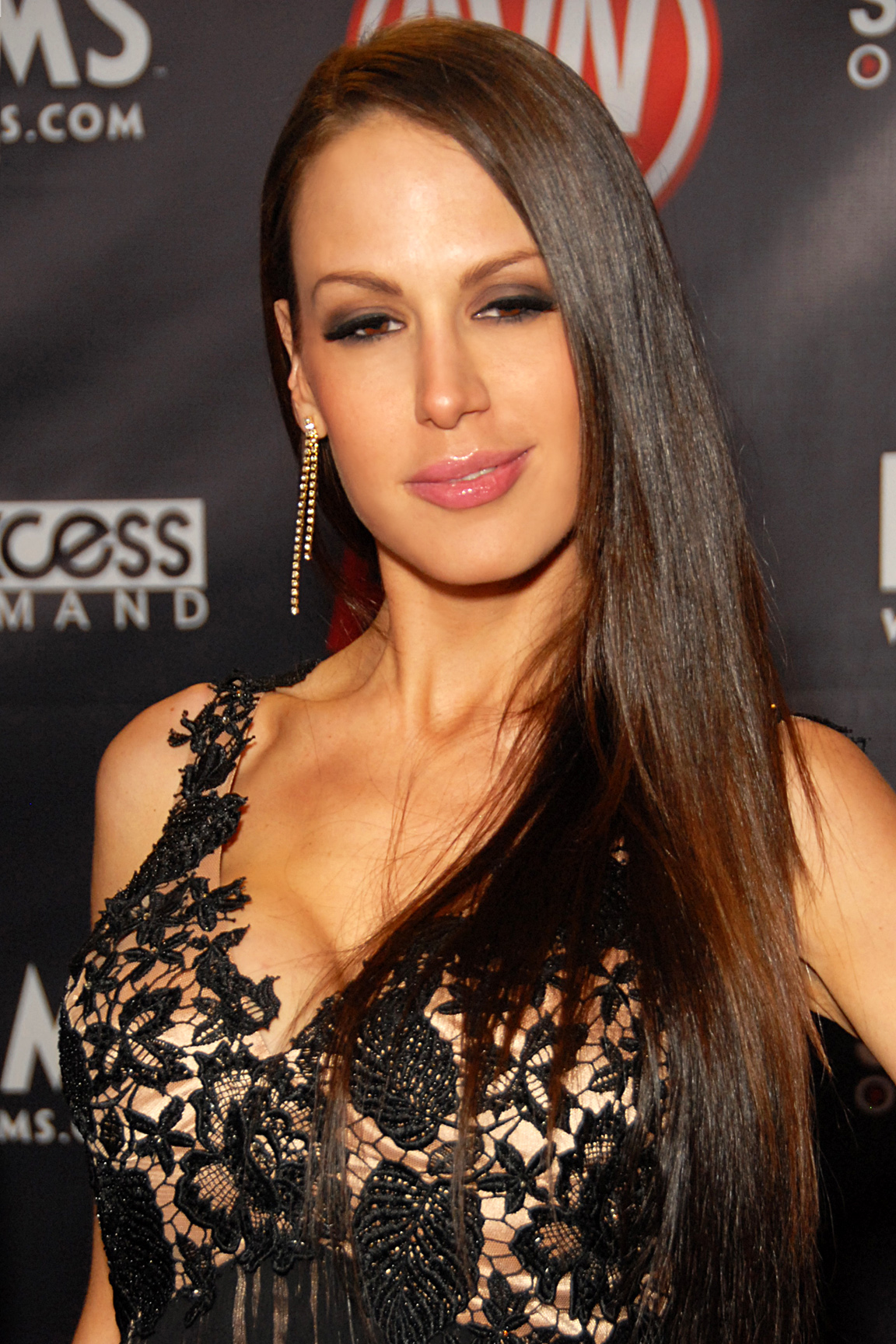
McKenzie Lee, Best New Starlet winner

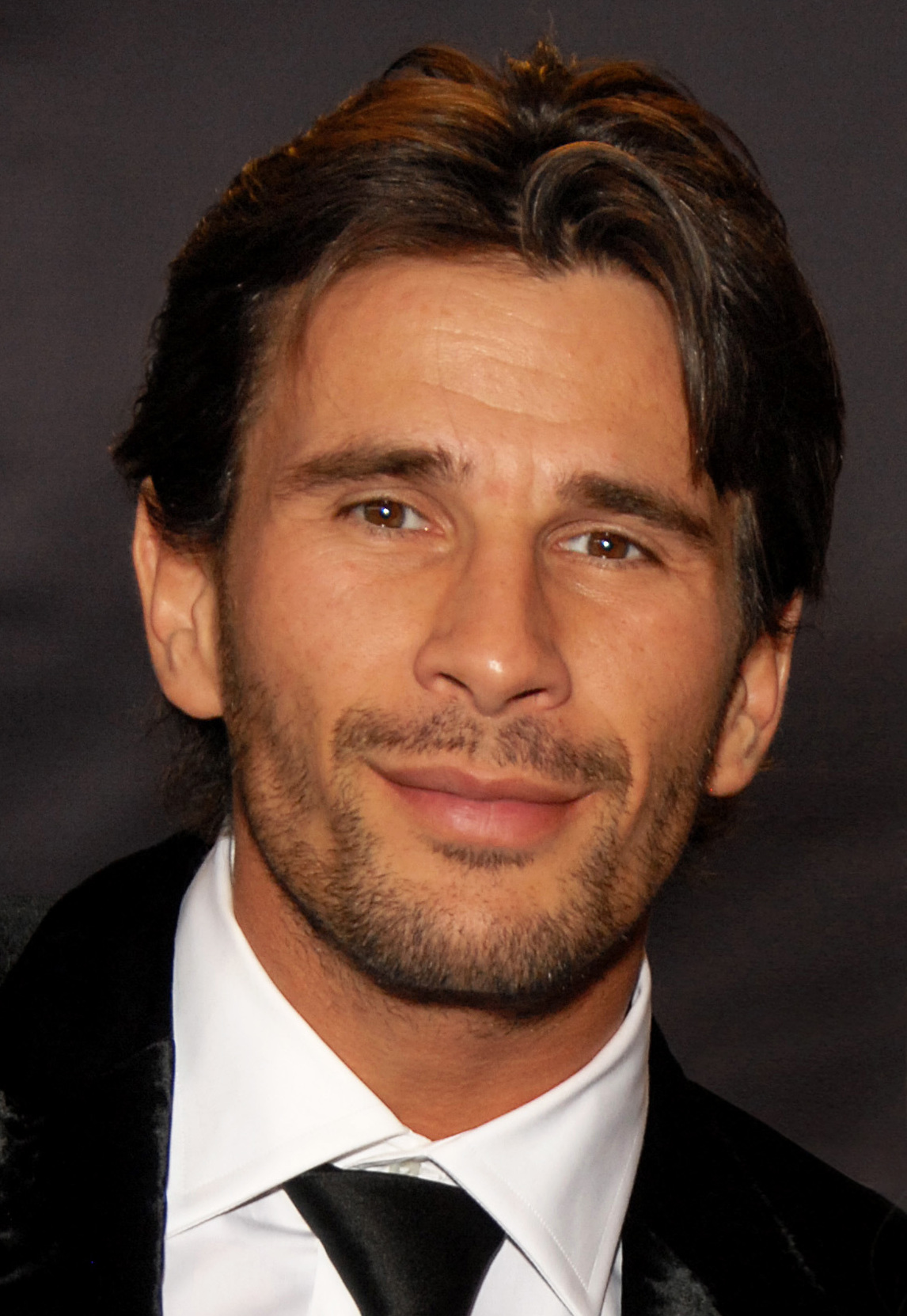
Manuel Ferrara, Male Performer of the Year winner

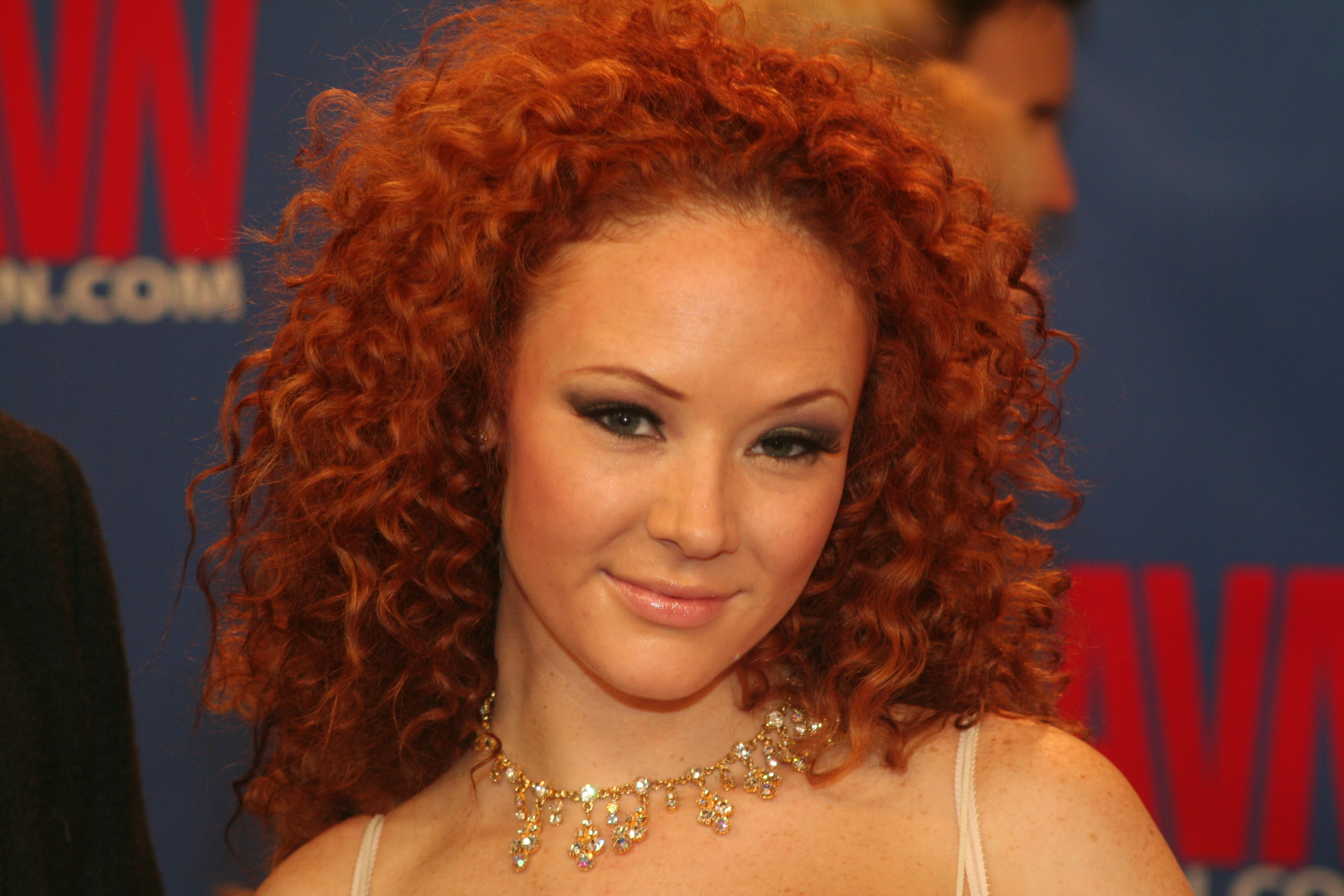
Audrey Hollander, Female Performer of the Year

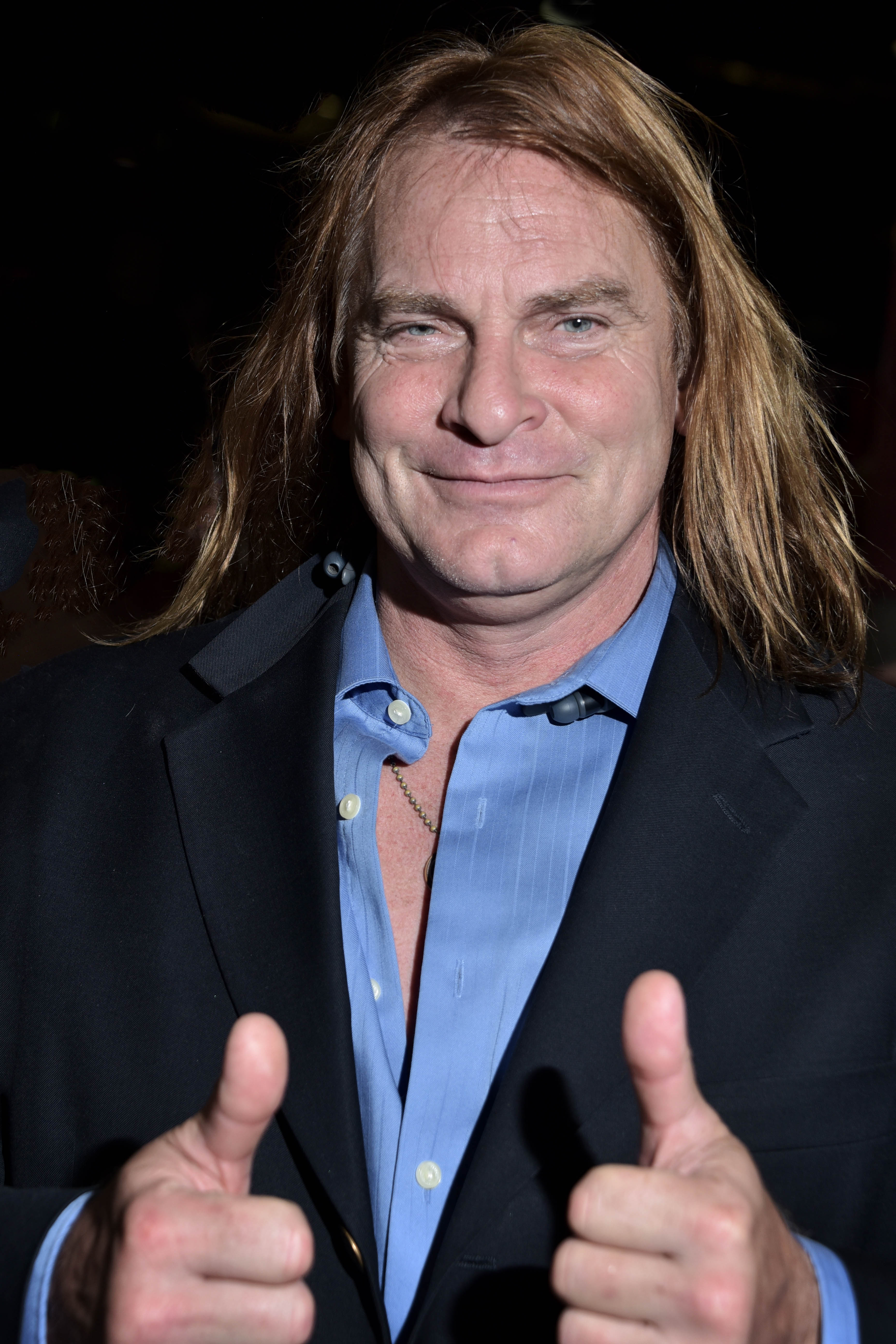
Evan Stone, Best Actor—Video winner

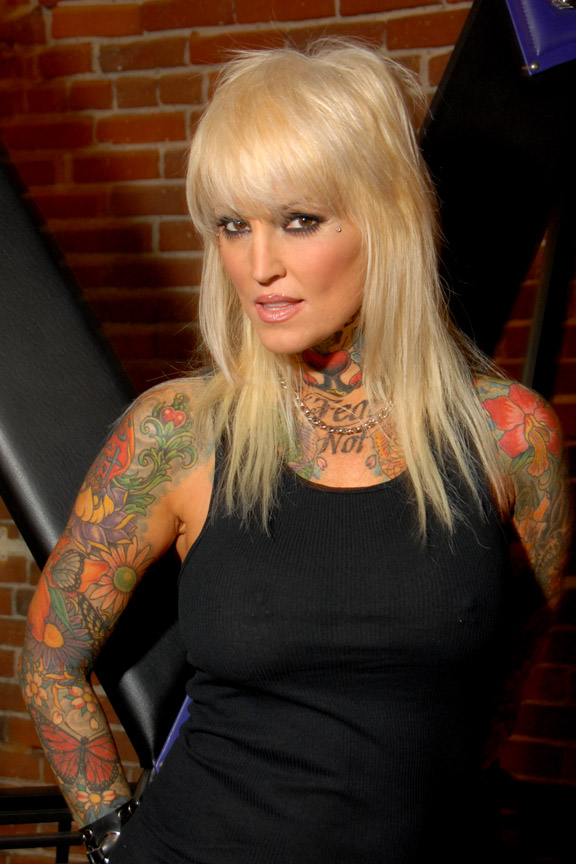
Janine Lindemulder, Best Actress—Video winner

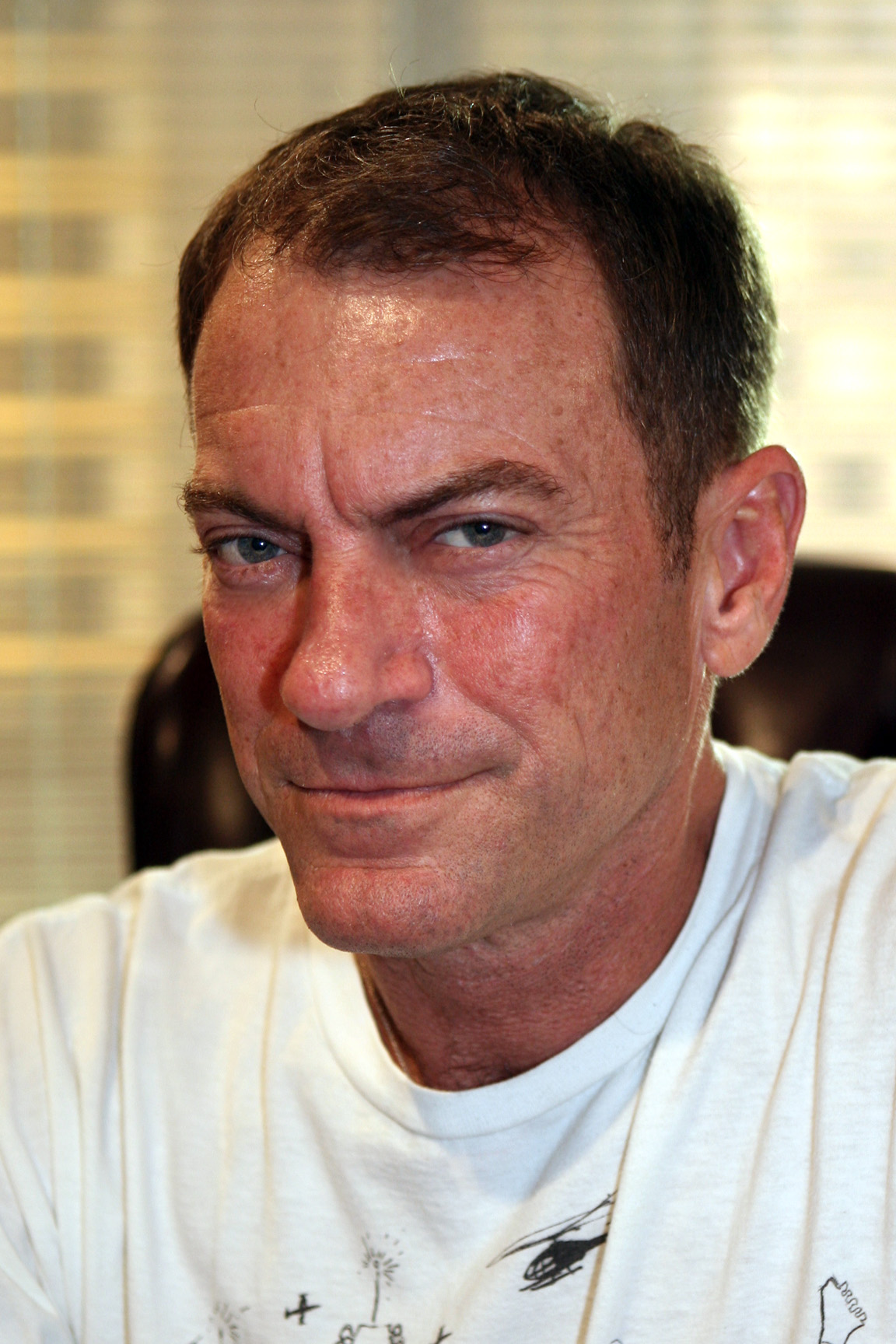
Randy Spears, Best Actor—Film winner

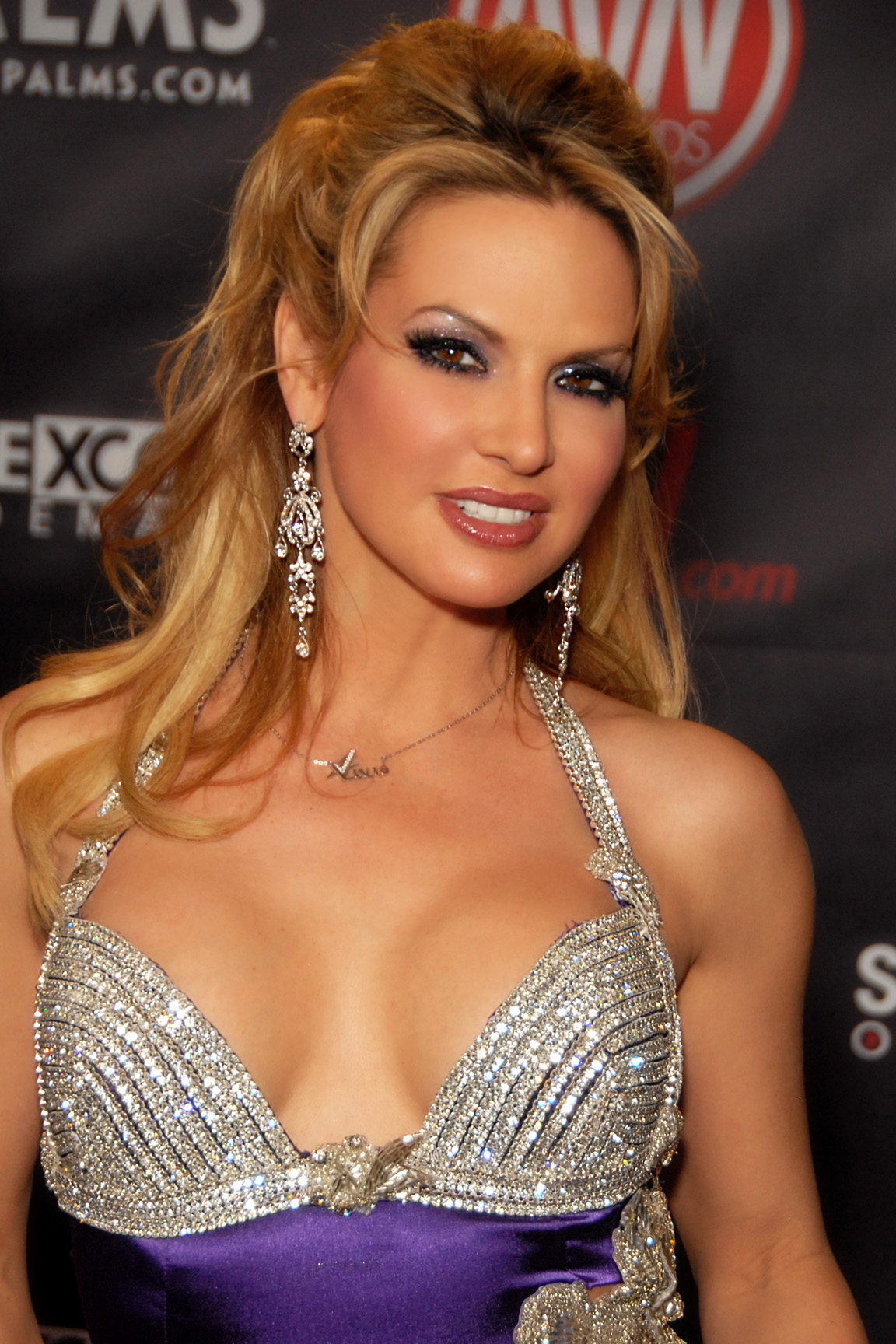
Savanna Samson, Best Actress—Film winner

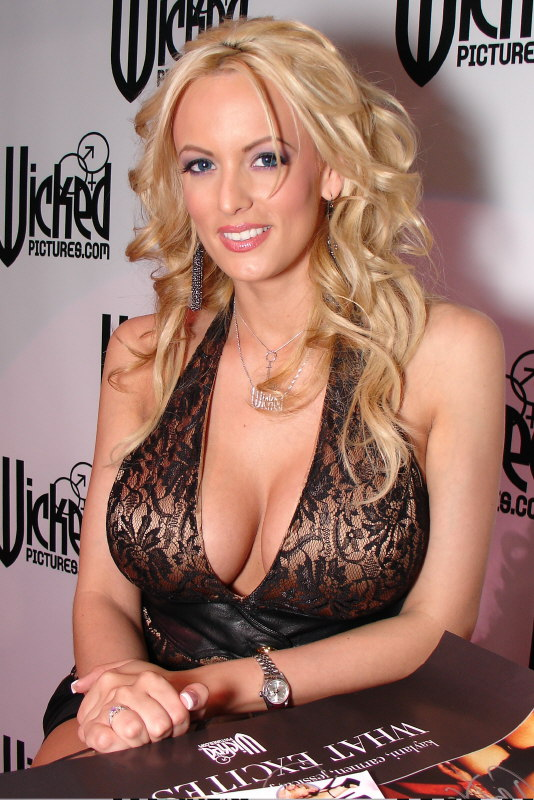
Stormy Daniels, Best Screenplay—Video winner and Best Supporting Actress—Video winner

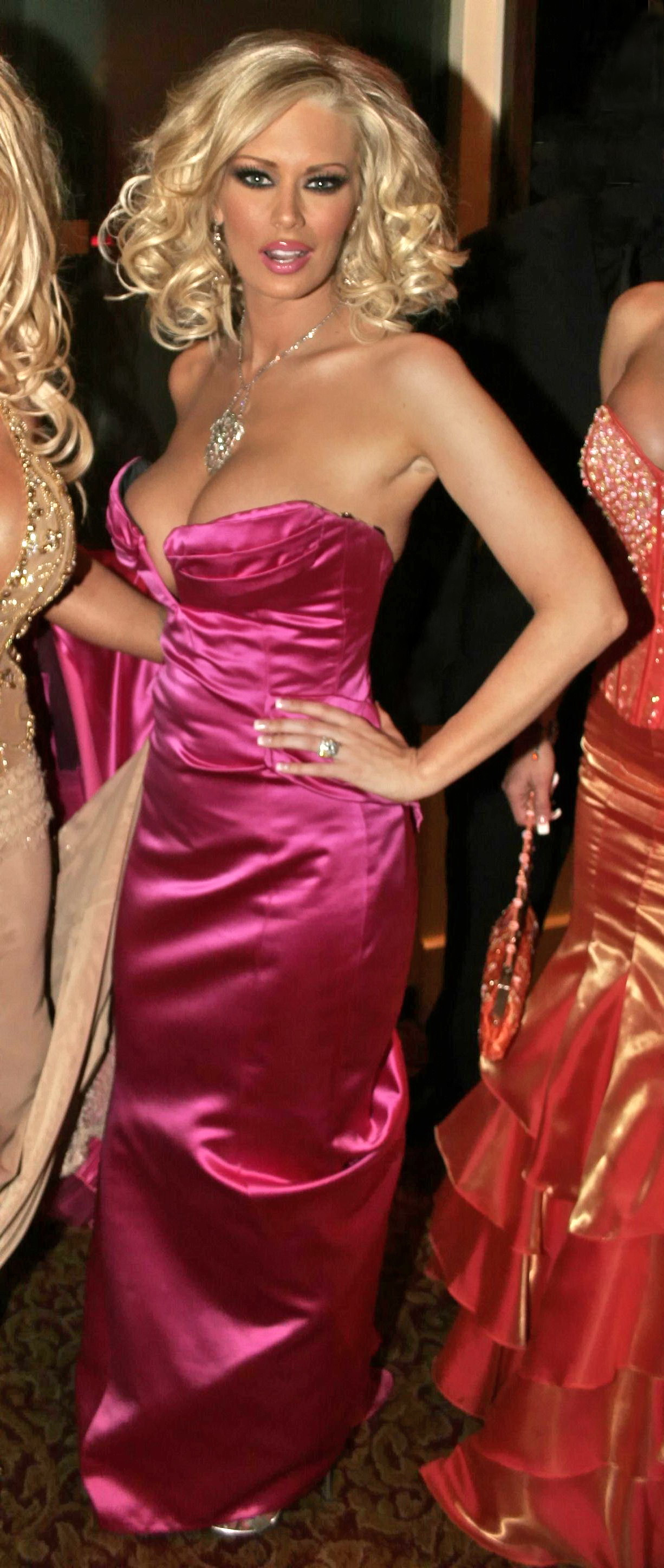
Jenna Jameson, Hall of Fame entrant

Winners are listed first, highlighted in boldface, and indicated with a double dagger (‡).

| Best Video Feature | Best Film |
|---|---|
| **Pirates**‡; Catherine; Contract Girl; Dark Angels 2: Bloodline; Drive; Killing Courtney Luv; Lexie & Monique Love Rocco; Lover's Lane; The Perfect Secretary; Porn Star; Prisoner; Undertow | **The Devil in Miss Jones**‡; Close-Ups; Dark Side; Emotions; Eternity; Last Girl Standing; Les Bitches; Sentenced; The Villa |
| Best High-Definition Production | Best New Starlet |
| **Pirates**‡; Artcore: Masquerade; Camp Cuddly Pines Powertool Massacre; Dark Angels 2: Bloodline; The Edge Runner; Hustler's Taboo 3; Jaded; Lover's Lane; Many Shades of Mayhem; Surrender the Booty; Teenage Dreamin'; Vamp | **McKenzie Lee**‡; Lori Alexia; Joanna Angel; Jasmine Byrne; Courtney Cummz; Brooke Haven; Jenaveve Jolie; Sunny Lane; Tory Lane; Vanessa Lane; Trina Michaels; Keri Sable; Hillary Scott; Taryn Thomas; Kelly Wells |
| Male Performer of the Year | Female Performer of the Year |
| **Manuel Ferrara**‡; Otto Bauer; Erik Everhard; Tommy Gunn; Kurt Lockwood; Mr. Marcus; Sean Michaels; Mr. Pete; Randy Spears; Lexington Steele; Michael Stefano; Evan Stone; Lee Stone; John Strong | **Audrey Hollander**‡; Nicki Hunter; Roxy Jezel; Ariana Jollee; Dillan Lauren; Melissa Lauren; Missy Monroe; Gia Paloma; Lauren Phoenix; Taylor Rain; Brittney Skye; Flower Tucci; Venus |
| Best Actor – Video | Best Actress – Video |
| **Evan Stone, Pirates**‡; Otto Bauer, Catherine; Barrett Blade, Dark Angels 2: Bloodline; Dillon, Dark Angels 2: Bloodline; Tommy Gunn, AGP: All Girl Protection; Dean James, Killing Courtney Luv; Dick Smothers, Jr., Dark Deception; Randy Spears, One Man's Obsession; Steven St. Croix, Undertow; George Uhl, Robinson Crusoe on Sin Island | **Janine, Pirates**‡; Kami Andrews, Texas' Asshole Massacre; Joanna Angel, Joanna's Angels; Cindy Crawford, Sodom; Jessica Drake, One Man's Obsession; Audrey Hollander, Catherine; Jesse Jane, Pirates; Devinn Lane, Lovers Lane; Sunny Lane, Dark Angels 2: Bloodline; Kaiya Lee, Shadow of a Geisha; Gia Paloma, Wild Things on the Run 2; Olivia Saint, Contract Girl; Savanna Samson, Freshness; Brittney Skye, Prisoner |
| Best Actor – Film | Best Actress – Film |
| **Randy Spears, Eternity**‡; Chris Cannon, Scorpio Rising; Nick Manning, Les Bitches; Alec Metro, Les Bitches; Herschel Savage, Dark Side | **Savanna Samson, The Devil in Miss Jones**‡; Sunrise Adams, Sentenced; Stormy Daniels, Eternity; Penny Flame, Dark Side; Janine, The Villa; Lezley Zen, Les Bitches |
Best Supporting Actress—Video
**Stormy Daniels, Camp Cuddly Pines Powertool Massacre**‡; Nikki Benz, Jack's Teen America 2; Jessica Drake, Camp Cuddly Pines Powertool Massacre; Audrey Hollander, Desperate Wives 2; Kimberly Kane, Polarity; Jennifer Luv, Taboo 21; Marie Luv, Jack's Teen America 7; Missy Monroe, Debbie Goes to Rehab; Haley Paige, Prisoner; Lauren Phoenix, The Edge Runner
| Best Director – Video | Best Director – Film |
| **Joone, Pirates**‡; Nic Andrews, Dark Angels 2: Bloodline; Brad Armstrong, Lovers Lane; David Aaron Clark, Shadow of a Geisha; D. Cypher, Prisoner; Red Ezra, Taboo 21; Joe Gallant, Killing Courtney Luv; Jonathan Morgan, Camp Cuddly Pines Powertool Massacre; Michael Ninn, Catherine; David Stanley, Perfect Kiss; Nicholas Steele, The Edge Runner; Paul Thomas, Lexie & Monique Love Rocco | **Paul Thomas, The Devil in Miss Jones**‡; Brad Armstrong, Eternity; James Avalon, Dark Side; Andrew Blake, Close-Ups; Chi Chi LaRue, Sentenced |
| Best Gonzo Release | Best Ethnic-Themed Video—Asian |
| **Slut Puppies**‡; Born for Porn; College Guide: How to Get More Pussy; Ghost Town; Gob Swappers; Jack's Playground 20; Myne Tease 2; Neo Pornographia; Otto & Audrey Destroy the World; Riot Sluts 2; Service Animals 21; She Swallows; Spring Chickens 9; Take No Prisoners; Teen Cum Squad; Welcome to Casa Butts, Again! | **Invasian 2**‡; Adult Toy Story 2; Asians 2; Cat Sperm Woman; Diary of a Mad Porn Director; Kum Pao; Oriental Orgy World 2; Poon Tang Clan; The Reign of Tera: Inside the Asian Love Palace; Shadow of a Geisha; Slant Eye for the Straight Guy; Slanted Holes 2; Tokyo Hush-Hush Fuckies 2; Torukeru; Yellow Fever |
| Best Couples Sex Scene—Video | Best Couples Sex Scene—Film |
| **Brittney Skye, Tommy Gunn, Porn Star**‡; Destiny DeVille, Mr. Marcus, Booty Talk 55; Hillary Scott, Tony T., Butt Blasted!; Flower Tucci, Van Damage, Cheek Freaks; Katsumi, Manuel Ferrara, Euro Domination 4; Sarah Blake, Nick Manning, Innocence: Perfect Pink; Kinzie Kenner, Christian, Jack's Teen America 6; Krystal Steal, Eric Masterson, Krystal Method; Monique Alexander, Rocco Siffredi, Lexie and Monique Love Rocco; Sandra Romain, Michael Stefano, Mind Fuck; Boo D. Licious, Talon, Raw Desire; Dasha, Dillon, Suck, Fuck, Swallow; Nikki Benz, Jules Jordan, Take No Prisoners; Tiffany Mynx, Mandingo, Tiffany & Cumpany; Taryn Thomas, Scott Nails, Vault of Whores; Taylor Rain, Mr. Pete, The Young and the Raunchy | **Penny Flame, Herschel Savage, Dark Side**‡; Savanna Samson, Nick Manning, The Devil in Miss Jones; Dominica Leoni, Tyce Bune, Emotions; Stormy Daniels, Randy Spears, Eternity; Jessica Drake, Tommy Gunn, Sold; Janine Lindemulder, Dale Dabone, The Villa |
| Best Anal Sex Scene—Video | Best Oral Sex Scene—Video |
| **Katsumi, Manuel Ferrara, Cumshitters**‡; Janet Alfano, Manuel Ferrara, Anal Expedition 6; Jasmine Byrne, Mark Ashley, Angels of Debauchery 4; Venus, Marco Duato Ass Quake; Lanny Barbie, Jules Jordan, Ass Worship 8; Nadia Styles, Kurt Lockwood, Barely Legal Corrupted; Tiffany Mynx, Tony T., Butt Blassted!; Audrey Hollander, Otto Bauer, Catherine; Taylor Rain, Anthony Hardwood, Evil Bitches; Kat, Magnum, Facial Explosions; Lauren Phoenix, Anthony Hardwood, Flesh Fest 3; Tyla Winn, Lee Stone, Give Me Gape 2; Roxanne Hall, Lexington Steele, Lex Steele XXX 5; Carmen, Mick Blue, Rapture; Dillan Lauren, Marco Duato, Raw Desire; Sandra Romain, Sascha, Semen Demons 2 | **Jassie, Kimberly Kane, Scott Lyons, Scott Nails, Kris Slater, Squealer**‡; Jamie Brooks, Brian Surewood, Ass Quake; Katsumi, Jules Jordan, Ass Worship 7, Alicia Rhodes, Leo, Big Gulps; Poppy Morgan, Taryn Thomas, Sascha, Blow Me Sandwich 7; Tiana Lynn, Mario Cassini, Johnny Fender, Scott Lyon, Brett Rockman, Arnold Schwartzenpecker, Feeding Frenzy 6; Destiny DeVille, Dick Nasty, Kyle Stone, Chris Mountain, Joe Rock, Glazed & Confused 5; Katja Kassin, Tony T., I Wanna Get Face Fucked; Sarah Blake, Eric Masterson, Jack's Playground 24; Dani Woodward, Brandon Iron, Lick My Balls; Sativa Rose, Joe Friday, Oral Junkies; Jesse Jane, Scott Nails, Pirates; Alektra Blue, Delilah Strong, Jonni Darkko, Suck it Dry; Jersey Jaxin, Jon Dough, John Strong, Teen Fuck Holes 2; Gia Paloma, Arnold Schwartzenpecker, Dick Nasty, Face Blaster, Johnny Fender, Jim Beem, Tonsil Train |
| Best Three-Way Sex Scene | Best All-Girl Sex Scene—Video |
| **Tyla Winn, Michael Stefano, John Strong, Tease Me Then Please Me 2**‡; Michelle B., Chris Charming, Tony T., Anal Retentive 5; Heather Gables, Manuel Ferrara, Randy Spears, Choke It Down; Sandra Romain, Heather Gables, Manuel Ferrara, Cum Fart Cocktails 2; Renee Pornero, Steve Holmes, Toni Ribas, Cum Guzzlers 4; Tory Lane, Francesca Lé, Mark Wood, A Different P.O.V.; Flower Tucci, Angela Stone, Lee Stone, Flower's Squirt Shower; Melissa Lauren, Avy Lee Roth, Erik Everhard, Fuck Dolls 3; Mari Possa, Barbara Summer, Herschel Savage, House of Ass; Jasmine Byrne, Mario Rossi, Jean Valjean, Innocence: Wild Child; Jamie Elle, Gigi, Joel Lawrence, Mouth 2 Mouth 2; Audrey Hollander, Dani Woodward, Alex Rox, Outgunned; Trina Michaels, Steve Holmes, John Strong, Sex Fiends 2; Angel Eyes, Olivia O’Lovely, Mr. Marcus, She Got Ass; McKenzie Lee, Jules Jordan, Mark Wood, Slut Puppies | **Janine, Jesse Jane, Pirates**‡; Audrey Hollander, Melissa Lauren, Venus, Babes Illustrated 15; Melissa Lauren, Sandra Romain, Be My Bitch; Brooke Haven, Taylor Kurtis, Missy Monroe, Staci Thorn, Big Toys No Boys 3; Nikki Blond, Audrey Hollander, Adriana Rouso, Catherine; Cytherea, Sandra Romain, Cousin Stevie's Pussy Party 7, Kimberly Kane, Katrina Kraven, Kylie Ireland, Julie Night, Lauren Phoenix, Epiphany; Alexia, Gigi, Kaylynn, Mackenzie Mack, Kirsten Price, Sammie Rhodes, Celeste Star, Lexxi Taylor, Girlvana; Katrina Kraven, Avy Lee Roth, Gothsend 2; Justine Joli, Jade Starr, Kill Girl Kill 2; Jenna Jameson, Krystal Steal, Krystal Method; Roxy Jezel, Katja Kassin, My Ass Is Haunted; Jesse Jane, Carmen Luvana, Pirates; Tiana Lynn, Sammie Rhodes, Dani Woodward, Supersquirt 2..3** Mari Possa, Samantha Ryan, Selena Silver, Flower Tucci, War of the Girls |

=== Additional Award Winners ===
These awards were announced, but not presented, in two pre-recorded winners-only segments during the event. Trophies were given to the recipients off-stage:

**DIRECTOR AWARDS**

- Best Director - Foreign Release: Rocco Siffredi, Who Fucked Rocco?
- Best Director - Non-Feature: Michael Ninn, Neo Pornographia

**MARKETING AWARDS**

- Best New Video Production Company: Swank Digital
- Best On-Line Marketing Campaign: PiratesXXX.com, Digital Playground/Adam & Eve
- Best Overall Marketing Campaign – Company Image: ClubJenna
- Best Overall Marketing Campaign – Individual Project: Mary Carey's Dinner with President Bush, Kick Ass Pictures
- Best Packaging: Catherine
- Best Retail Website – Rentals: WantedList.com
- Best Retail Website – Sales: AdultDVDEmpire.com
- Top Renting Title of the Year: The Masseuse (2004 remake)
- Top Selling Title of the Year: 1 Night in China

**PERFORMER AWARDS**

- Best Male Newcomer: Scott Nails
- Best Non-Sex Performance: William Margold, Dark Side
- Best Supporting Actor–Film: Randy Spears, Dark Side
- Best Supporting Actor–Video: Tommy Gunn, Pirates
- Best Supporting Actress–Film: Jenna Jameson, The Devil in Miss Jones
- Best Tease Performance: Katsumi, Ass Worship 7
- Crossover Star of the Year: Jenna Jameson
- Female Foreign Performer of the Year: Katsumi
- Male Foreign Performer of the Year: Steve Holmes
- Transsexual Performer of the Year: Gia Darling

**PRODUCTION AWARDS**

- Best All-Girl Release: Belladonna's Fucking Girls
- Best All-Girl Series: Cousin Stevie's Pussy Party
- Best All-Sex Release: Squealer
- Best Alternative Release: Pornomation
- Best Amateur Release: BangBus 6
- Best Amateur Series: BangBus
- Best Anal-Themed Release: Ass Worship 7
- Best Anal-Themed Series: Big Wet Asses
- Best Classic Release on DVD: Ginger Lynn: The Movie
- Best Continuing Video Series: Girlvert
- Best DVD: Pirates, FX
- Best Ethnic-Themed Video–Black: Big Ass Party
- Best Ethnic-Themed Video–Latin: Caliente
- Best Ethnic-Themed Series: Black Reign
- Best Foreign All-Sex Release: Cabaret Bizarre
- Best Foreign All-Sex Series: Euro Domination
- Best Foreign Feature: Robinson Crusoe on Sin Island
- Best Gonzo Series: Service Animals
- Best Interactive DVD: Virtual Katsumi
- Best Interracial Release: Lex Steele XXX 5
- Best Mainstream Adult Release: Inside Deep Throat
- Best Oral-Themed Release: Blow Me Sandwich 7
- Best Oral-Themed Series: Glazed and Confused
- Best POV Release: Manuel Ferrara's POV
- Best Pro-Am Release: Rocco's Initiations 9
- Best Pro-Am Series: Midnight Prowl

**Production (ctd.)**

- Best Sex Comedy: Camp Cuddly Pines Powertool Massacre
- Best Vignette Release: Vault of Whores
- Best Vignette Series: Grudgefuck

**SEX SCENE AWARDS**

- Best All-Girl Sex Scene–Film: Jenna Jameson, Savanna Samson, The Devil in Miss Jones
- Best Anal Sex Scene–Film: Audrey Hollander, Otto Bauer, Sentenced
- Best Group Sex Scene–Film: Alicia Alighatti, Penny Flame, Dillan Lauren, Hillary Scott, Randy Spears, John West, Dark Side
- Best Group Sex Scene–Video: Smokey Flame, Audrey Hollander, Jassie, Kimberly Kane, Otto Bauer, Scott Lyons, Kris Slater, Scott Nails, Squealer
- Best Oral Sex Scene–Film: Alicia Alighatti, Hillary Scott, Randy Spears, Dark Side
- Best Sex Scene in a Foreign-Shot Production: Sandra Romain, Jean-Yves Le Castel, Kid Jamaica, Nick Lang, Euro Domination
- Best Solo Sex Scene: Katja Kassin, Anal Showdown
- Most Outrageous Sex Scene: Joanna Angel in "Blood, Disembowelment, and Fucking...What Fun...", Re-Penetrator

**SPECIALTY AWARDS**

- Best Solo Release: Blu Dreams
- Best Specialty Release–Big Bust: Faster Pussycat! Fuck! Fuck!
- Best Specialty Release–BDSM: Jenna Loves Pain
- Best Specialty Release–Fem-Dom Strap-On: His Ass is Mine
- Best Specialty Release–Foot Fetish: Coxxx and Soxxx 4
- Best Specialty Release–MILF: MILF Seeker
- Best Specialty Release–Other Genre: Chunky Housecall Nurses 2
- Best Specialty Release–Spanking: A Submissive Mind
- Best Specialty Release–Squirting: Flower's Squirt Shower 2
- Best Transsexual Release: Rogue Adventures 24
- Best Specialty Series: Cum Drippers

**TECHNICAL AWARDS**

- Best Art Direction–Film: The Devil in Miss Jones
- Best Art Direction–Video: Catherine
- Best Cinematography: Ralph Parfait, The Devil in Miss Jones
- Best DVD Extras: Camp Cuddly Pines Powertool Massacre
- Best DVD Menus: Camp Cuddly Pines Powertool Massacre
- Best Editing–Film: Sonny Malone, The Devil in Miss Jones
- Best Editing–Video: Dark Angels 2: Bloodline
- Best Music: Skin Muzik, Pirates
- Best Screenplay–Film: Dean Nash, Raven Touchstone, The Devil in Miss Jones
- Best Screenplay–Video: Stormy Daniels, Jonathan Morgan, August Warwick, Camp Cuddly Pines Powertool Massacre
- Best Special Effects: FX, Pirates
- Best Videography: Nic Andrews, Dark Angels 2: Bloodline

=== Honorary AVN Awards ===
==== Reuben Sturman Award ====
- Robert Zicari and Janet Zicari, Extreme Associates

==== Special Achievement Award ====
- The Fashionistas Live Show, John Stagliano

==== Hall of Fame ====
AVN Hall of Fame inductees for 2006 were: Chloe, Nick East, Mickey G., Steve Hatcher, Janet Jacme, Jenna Jameson, Lynn LeMay, Cara Lott, Cash Markman, Rodney Moore, Jack Remy, Stephanie Swift, Jerome Tanner

- Founders Branch: Norman Arno, VCX; Noel Bloom, Swedish Erotica/Caballero Home Video; Larry Flynt, Hustler

=== Multiple nominations and awards ===
The following releases received the most nominations.

| Nominations | Movie |
|---|---|
| 24 | Pirates |
| 19 | The Devil in Miss Jones |
| 17 | Eternity |
| 16 | Dark Angels 2: Bloodline |
| 16 | Dark Side |
| 15 | Camp Cuddly Pines Powertool Massacre |
| 15 | Catherine |
| 11 | Raw Desire |
| 10 | Squealer |

The following 10 releases received multiple awards:

| Awards | Movie |
|---|---|
| 11 | Pirates |
| 9 | The Devil in Miss Jones |
| 5 | Camp Cuddly Pines Powertool Massacre |
| 5 | Dark Side |
| 3 | Squealer |
| 2 | Ass Worship 7 |
| 2 | BangBus 6 |
| 2 | Catherine |
| 2 | Dark Angels 2: Bloodline |
| 2 | Euro Domination |

== Presenters and performers ==
The following individuals presented awards or performed musical numbers or comedy sketches.

=== Presenters (in order of appearance) ===
| Name(s) | Role |
|---|---|
| Sunny Leone; Tory Lane; Randy Spears | Presenters of the awards for Best Supporting Actress—Video, Best All-Girl Sex Scene—Video and Best Gonzo Release |
| Belladonna; Valentina Vaughn; Lee Stone | Presenters of the awards for Best Couples Sex Scene—Film, Best High-Definition Release |
| Carmen Luvana; Kirsten Price; Jim Norton | Presenters of the awards for Best Anal Sex Scene—Video and Best Ethnic-Themed Release—Asian |
| Jenna Jameson; Nikita Denise | Presenters of the awards for Best Oral Sex Scene—Video and Male Performer of the Year |
| Jessica Drake; Alana Evans | Presenters of the awards for Best Actor—Video, Best Threeway Sex Scene |
| Tiana Lynn; McKenzie Lee; Barrett Blade | Presenters of the awards for Best Couples Sex Scene—Video and Best Actress—Video |
| Chi Chi LaRue; Lexington Steele; Vanessa Blue | Presenters of the awards for Best Actor—Film and Best Director—Video |
| Joanna Angel; Sandee Westgate | Presenters of the award for Female Performer of the Year and Best Director—Film |
| Jesse Jane | Introduction of the trophy girls, Holly Wellin and Courtney Cummz |
| Cytherea | Presenter of the award for Best New Starlet |
| Ron Jeremy; Sunny Lane; Mary Carey | Presenters of the awards for Best Actress—Film and Best Film |
| Lauren Phoenix; Monica Mayhem; Daphne Rosen | Presenters of the award for Best Video Feature |

=== Performers ===
| Name(s) | Role | Performed |
|---|---|---|
| Mark Stone and the AVN Orchestra | Musical Director/Producer | Orchestral |
| Olympic Gardens dancers Club Sapphire dancers | Performers | Dance |
| Greg Fitzsimmons | Performer | Standup comedy segment |
| Steven St. Croix; Marc Spiegler | Performers | "Bareback Mountain" comedy spoof |
| Hedley | Performers | Musical number, “On My Own” |
| Randy Spears; Stormy Daniels; Ariana Jollee; Flower Tucci | Performers | Watching interactive porn comedy sketches |
| Ron Jeremy | Performer | "The AVN Challenge" comedy sketch |
| DJ Quik | Performer | Hip-hop musical number |

== Ceremony information ==
Several new categories debuted, including Crossover Star of the Year (for impact in mainstream media), Best New Video Production Company and several Specialty genre awards. Meanwhile, multiple packaging categories were condensed into one Best Packaging award due to the demise of VHS as a video format.

High Society magazine and Reuters reported the event's attendance record was shattered as more than 5,000 people watched the show.

=== Performance of year's movies ===
1 Night in China was announced as the top selling movie and the 2004 remake of The Masseuse as the top renting movie of the previous year.

=== Critical reviews ===
High Society (magazine)|High Society termed the event a "smashing success."

== See also ==
- AVN Award
- AVN Best New Starlet Award
- AVN Award for Male Performer of the Year
- AVN Award for Male Foreign Performer of the Year
- AVN Female Performer of the Year Award
- List of members of the AVN Hall of Fame
- 2006 GayVN Awards
