= Lovers Lane (2005 film) =

2005 film by Brad Armstrong

- DVD released by Wicked Pictures
- Directed by: Brad Armstrong
- Written by: Stormy Daniels; Brad Armstrong
- Starring: Exotica; Evan Stone; Mikayla Cox; Jennifer Luv; Nadia Styles; Devinn Lane; Randy Spears; Jessica Drake; Jewel Valmont; Kimberly Kane; Brad Armstrong
- Cinematography: Jake Jacobs; Francois Clousot
- Edited by: Eddie Door
- Music by: L.P.
- Production company: Wicked Pictures
- Distributed by: Wicked Pictures
- Release date: June 29, 2005 (United States)
- Running time: 150 minutes
- Country: United States
- Language: English

Lovers Lane is a 2005 pornographic horror film written and directed by Brad Armstrong, and co-written by Stormy Daniels.

== Plot ==
A pair of college students from the small California town of Montgomery go to the local lovers' lane, Hidden Point, to have sex, and are stabbed to death by a hooded figure with a hook for a hand. The next night, another young couple is attacked in the same area. The man's throat is slit, and the woman narrowly escapes, being chased through the woods and to the road, where she flags down a passing car. As the ten-year college reunion, student prom, and tourist season are all fast approaching, the mayor and governor call the FBI for assistance, to the annoyance of the case's initial investigator, Deputy Sarah Blake. Sarah believes these killings could be connected to the similar and still unsolved murders of her sister Laura and Laura's boyfriend, which occurred ten years earlier at Hidden Point.

A curfew is set in an attempt to keep people in at night, and Sarah semi-reluctantly teams up with FBI Agent Roberts to work on the case. The two decide to go undercover as a couple at the college reunion, and the sexual tension between the pair grows to the point that they end up having sex in Roberts's motel room. At the reunion, Sarah's ex-boyfriend Andy and another attendee named Allison sneak into the campus nurses' station to have sex, exit the building, and are attacked by the Hook, who stabs Andy in the back. Hearing Allison's screams, Sarah and Roberts rush outside, prompting the Hook to abandon his pursuit of Allison in favor of going after them.

Roberts is knocked out, and Sarah is chased back into the school, where she discovers a body stuffed in a closet with a yearbook that reads "Die Bitch Die". Sarah is eventually cornered in the gymnasium (where she finds evidence of more victims) and as the killer is about to strike her down, Allison appears, having recognized the Hook as Stanley Smith, a former classmate who was bullied relentlessly and is now Agent Davis, Roberts's partner.

Stanley reveals he was the one who murdered Sarah's sister (one of his bullies) ten years ago, and that he saw this reunion as the perfect opportunity to get his revenge on all his old tormentors (the butchering of the college students was merely a means of making the rampage look completely random). As Allison (one of the few people who were kind to him during their school days) tries to talk Stanley down, Sarah grabs a fire axe and kills Stanley with it, just as Roberts and two police officers arrive.

== Cast ==
- Devinn Lane as Deputy Sarah Blake
- Jessica Drake as Katie
- Jewel Valmont as Allison
- Exotica as Maria Mendoza
- Nadia Styles as Julie
- Kimberly Kane as Amanda
- Jennifer Luv as Ann
- Mikayla Cox as Tiffany Miller
- Randy Spears as FBI Agent Roberts
- Brad Armstrong as Randy Laurence
- Evan Stone as Andy Jones
- Chris Cannon as Ryan
- Kris Slater as Wayne
- Eric Masterson as Jeremy Bailey
- Talon as Steve
- Stormy Daniels as Shannon
- Shelby Stevens as Johnny

== Reception ==
An 8.79 out of 10 was given by Cyberspace Adult Video Reviews.

Devinn Lane was nominated for Best Actress - Video and Brad Armstrong for Best Director - Video at the 2006 AVN Awards. The company itself gave the film a score of four and a half out of five, complimenting the art direction and sex scenes, and describing it as "suspenseful, erotic and moving throughout".
