= DVDEmpire.com =

DVD retail sales website

DVDEmpire.com Logo

DVDEmpire.com is a DVD retail sales website. It is a privately owned company based near Pittsburgh, Pennsylvania. The retailer began operating in the mid-1990s.

The website offers mainstream and adult video via a group of websites which include AdultDVDEmpire.com, AdultEmpire Unlimited, AdultEmpire.com, GayDVDEmpire.com, AdultEmpireCash.com, PornStarEmpire.com and UsedDVDEmpire.com.

== History ==
DVDEmpire.com was created by Jeff Rix and John-Michael D’Arcangelo, two computer programmers. At the time they were both working on eCommerce projects for an industrial safety distributor. D’Arcangelo approached Rix, telling him about the new DVD format, pitching the idea of selling online. On August 18, 1997, DVDEmpire.com website was launched. It was incorporated in Pennsylvania on September 17, 1997, as Right Ascension, Inc. With $6,000 in start-up funds, the company became a full-time occupation for the two partners. The site's design aimed for ease of navigation, and allowed customers to edit every aspect of their orders prior to shipment, and were the first to offer pre-ordering of DVDs.

In late 1997, DVDEmpire.com launched AdultDVDEmpire.com and began selling adult DVDs. This move coincided with the first adult DVD release, Bobby Sox by Vivid Studios.

The website was first operated near Mars, Pennsylvania in early 1998. After outgrowing that location, operations were moved to its current facility in Warrendale, Pennsylvania in August 2000.

=== Competition ===
Rather than compete with other websites' spending on marketing, the owners of DVDEmpire.com instead chose to focus on building a closer relationship with existing customers. Efforts concentrated on customer service, website simplicity, and effective order fulfillment.

In 2000, as most other DVD retailers on the Internet were slashing prices (to the point where products were being sold at a loss), DVDEmpire.com remained one of the higher priced DVD retailers. By continuing to follow the original business plan of customer service and order fulfillment, DVDEmpire.com weathered the price wars and the dotcom collapses in 2000, and emerged with a still-viable company. In late 2000, their two largest competitors (Reel.com and DVDExpress.com) sold their assets and closed their doors.

In October 2015, Adult Empire announced a new partnership with TLA Entertainment.

=== Expansion ===
In December 2006, Adult DVD Empire became the first adult retailer to start selling high-definition titles, with the release of Wicked Pictures' Camp Cuddly Pines Powertool Massacre on HD DVD. In March 2007, Adult DVD Empire became the first adult retailer to offer Blu-ray titles, starting with Vivid's Debbie Does Dallas ... Again.

In June 2007, Adult DVD Empire became the first online retailer to offer adult content for the iPhone, partnering with Digital Playground to offer complete hard-core scenes and launched a fully responsive website in August 2015.

In September 2014, Adult DVD Empire released the first movie under its new production label, Adult Empire Films (later restyled as AE Films). The label received multiple nominations at both the AVN and XBIZ award ceremonies in 2016.

=== Closing of games division ===
In February 2007, DVDEmpire.com announced that it would be closing its video game division. This announcement came in the form of an open letter to the industry, posted on their website, which included such statements as "Video Game Industry Does Not Care" and "80% of Games Suck". The letter cited preferential treatment for larger sellers, lack of price protection, and overall inferior game quality as the main contributors to the division's demise. (Note: The original letter is no longer available on DVDEmpire.com)

Two weeks later on February 12, 2007, DVDEmpire.com officially closed their games section and, according to another memo posted on their site, donated the remaining games to the Mars Home for Youth.

The company now employs 60 full- and part-time employees, with its websites handling up to 2.5 million unique visitors each month. Its warehouse ships over 500,000 domestic and international packages each year. DVDEmpire.com has expanded its adult sites' offerings, now presenting subscription and a la carte DVD Rentals, streaming and downloadable Video on Demand, sex toys and the subscription-based streaming program AdultEmpire Unlimited.

== Awards and recognition ==
AdultDVDEmpire.com has won Adult Video News' Best Retail Website Award in 2000, 2004, 2005, 2006, 2007, 2008, 2010, 2011, 2012, 2016, 2017, 2018 and 2020 as well as the XBIZ award for Adult Site of the Year (VOD) in 2015, 2016, 2017, 2018, 2019 and 2020. In addition to these awards, Jeff Rix and John-Michael D'Arcangelo were featured in the July 2007 issue of AVN, in an article entitled "50 Under 40: The Most Influential People In Porn". DVDEmpire.com was one of only four featured online retailers, along with Good Vibrations, Sportsheets International, Inc., and WantedList.
