= Fans of Adult Media and Entertainment Award =

American pornographic film award

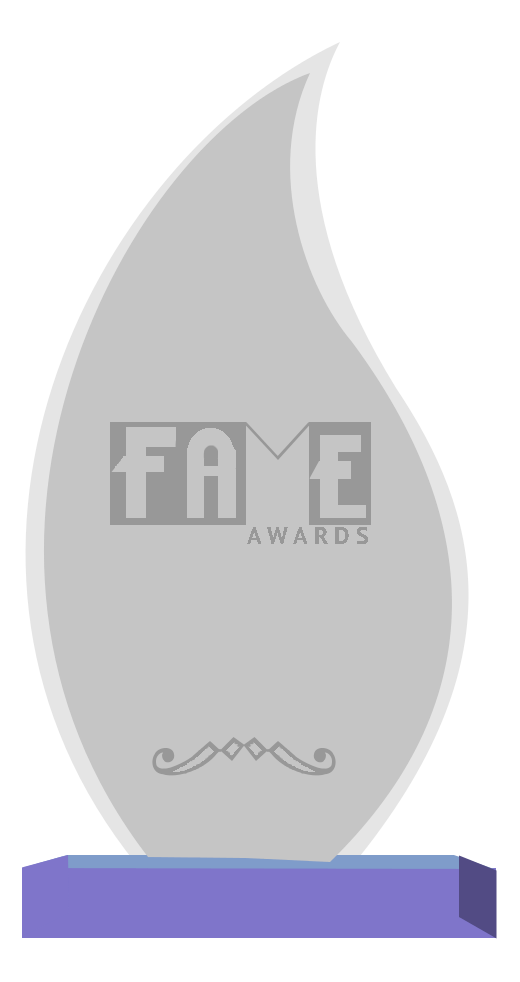
- A "F.A.M.E. Awards" trophy
- Date: June 24, 2006
- Location: Los Angeles
- Country: United States
- Website: www.thefameawards.com

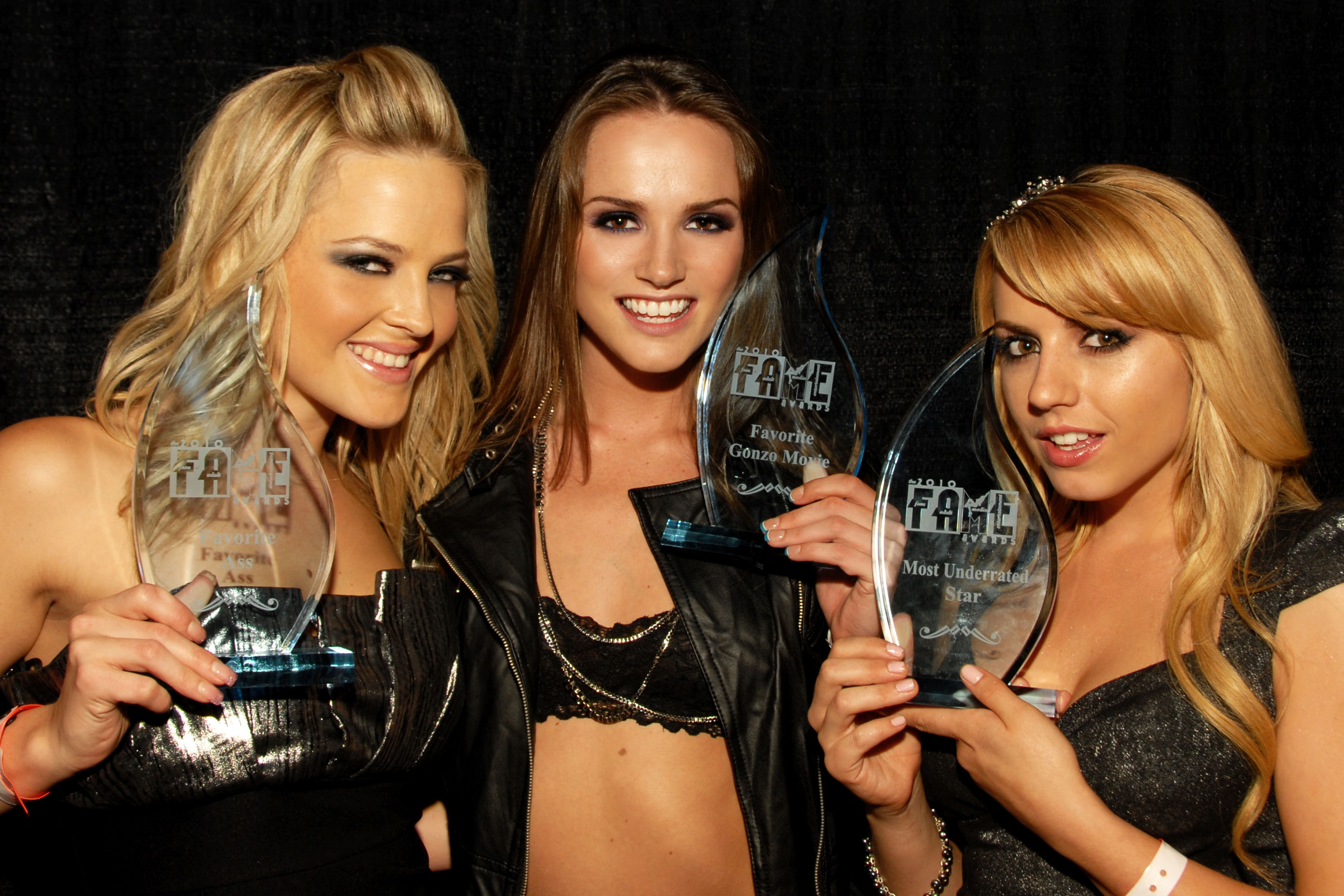
Alexis Texas, Tori Black and Lexi Belle displaying their trophies backstage at the F.A.M.E. Awards in 2010

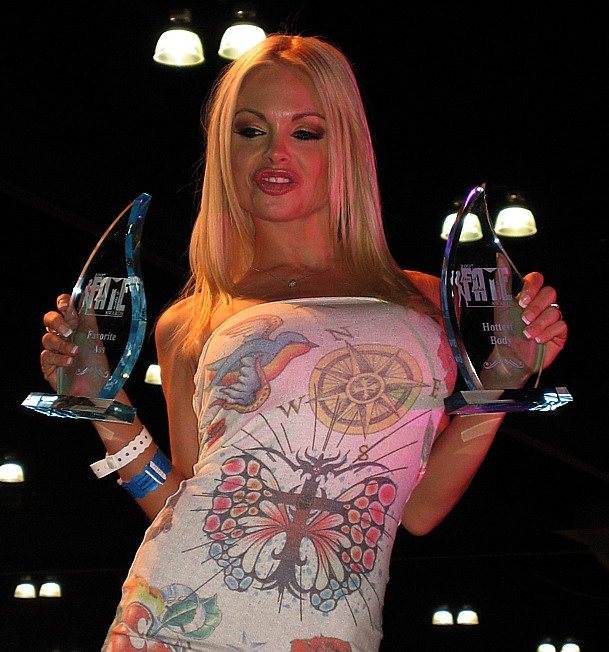
Jesse Jane holding two F.A.M.E. Awards in 2007

The Fans of Adult Media and Entertainment Awards (or F.A.M.E. Awards) were created in 2006 by Genesis, Adam & Eve, WantedList, Playboy Radio and AVN as a means for the general public to vote for their favorite adult film stars, directors, movies, and companies. The Awards were presented during the Erotica LA show at the Los Angeles Convention Center.

Voting consisted of two rounds of secure online voting by fans that were over the age of 18. The first round was the Nomination round, and then top five names from the first round (called the "Finalists") were forwarded to the final voting round. Winners received a teardrop-shaped Lucite trophy.

The 2006 F.A.M.E. Awards were hosted by Carmen Luvana, Tommy Gunn, and comedian/radio host "The Reverend" Bob Levy on June 24, 2006.

For the 2007 Awards, over 100,000 votes were cast, and the ceremony was held on June 23, 2007, co-hosted by Tera Patrick & Evan Stone, and streamed live on the Internet. The rules for the second round of voting were changed slightly in 2007 so that eight "Finalists" were chosen in each category to go on to the final rounding of secure online voting.

The 2008 Awards (for which fans logged nearly 104,000 online votes) were co-hosted by Jesse Jane & Randy Spears and held on June 7, 2008. During the 2008 F.A.M.E. Awards ceremony, the AVN Award for "Best Renting Title of the Year" (which went to Debbie Does Dallas... Again) was actually presented because (in the words of AVN founder Paul Fishbein) it was "really a fan award." The 2008 winner of the "Favorite Female Starlet" F.A.M.E. Award was also given a pearl Tiffany's necklace as well.

The 2009 Awards were hosted by Stormy Daniels and held on June 13, 2009, and the 2009 F.A.M.E. "Favorite Star Website" Award winner was TeraPatrick.com.

The 2010 Awards were co-hosted by Jessica Drake & Sunny Leone, and the 2010 F.A.M.E. "Favorite Porn Parody" Award winner was Batman XXX: A Porn Parody (Vivid Entertainment).

Below are the winners for 2006–10.

== Winners ==
	2006	2007	2008	2009	2010
Favorite Female Starlet	Jenna Jameson	Tera Patrick	Tera Patrick	Tera Patrick	Tori Black
Favorite Male Star	Ron Jeremy	Randy Spears	Evan Stone	Evan Stone	Evan Stone
Favorite Oral Starlet	Carmen Luvana	Jenna Haze	Penny Flame	Jenna Haze	Sasha Grey
Favorite Anal Starlet	Taylor Rain	Courtney Cummz	Jenna Haze	Belladonna	Jenna Haze
Favorite Breasts	Stormy Daniels	Stormy Daniels	Ashlynn Brooke	Stormy Daniels	Sunny Leone
Favorite Ass	Jenna Haze	Teagan Presley	Gina Lynn	Teagan Presley	Alexis Texas
Hottest Body	Jenna Jameson	Jesse Jane	Jesse Jane	Jesse Jane	Teagan Presley
Favorite Female Rookie	Alektra Blue and Brandy Talore (tie)	Amy Ried	Bree Olson	Tori Black	Lupe Fuentes
Favorite Feature Movie	Pirates	Island Fever 4	Babysitters	Pirates II: Stagnetti's Revenge	2040
Favorite Gonzo Movie	Belladonna: No Warning	Jenna Haze Dark Side	InTERActive	Lex the Impaler 3	Tori Black Is Pretty Filthy
Favorite Celebrity Sex Tape			1 Night in Paris		
Favorite Director	Jules Jordan	Jules Jordan	Stormy Daniels	Belladonna	Jules Jordan
Dirtiest Girl in Porn	Taryn Thomas	Belladonna	Hillary Scott	Jenna Haze	Jenna Haze
Favorite Studio		Vivid Entertainment	Evil Angel	Brazzers	Vivid Entertainment
Favorite Performer of All Time		Jenna Jameson			
Favorite Underrated Star			Brooke Haven	Daisy Marie	Lexi Belle
MILF/Cougar Star					Lisa Ann
