= Camp Cuddly Pines Powertool Massacre =

- Cover art
- Directed by: Jonathan Morgan
- Written by: Stormy Daniels; Jonathan Morgan; Timothy A. Bennett
- Starring: Jessica Drake; Stormy Daniels
- Cinematography: Francois Clousot
- Edited by: Jonathan Morgan
- Production company: Wicked Pictures
- Distributed by: Wicked Pictures
- Release date: September 14, 2005
- Running time: 151 minutes
- Country: United States
- Language: English

Camp Cuddly Pines Powertool Massacre is a 2005 pornographic slasher comedy film released by Wicked Pictures. The film, originally released on September 14, 2005, is the first adult film to be released on the HD DVD format.

== Plot ==
The film is a comedic parody of horror films of its time, with a cross between The Texas Chainsaw Massacre and Friday the 13th. College students Kristen (Daniels) and Megan (Drake) are planning to attend a concert. After they hit a homeless man with their car, the girls and their friends are systematically murdered.

== Cast ==
- Stormy Daniels as Kirsten
- Jessica Drake as Megan
- Eric Masterson as Rayford
- Voodoo as Todd
- Tommy Gunn as Josh
- Keri Sable as Porn Slut
- Devon Michaels as Hillbilly Girl
- Nicole Sheridan as The Ring Girl
- Rita Faltoyano as Mental Inmate #1
- Rebecca Love as Mental Inmate #2
- Taryn Thomas as Mental Inmate #3
- Katja Kassin as Mental Inmate #4
- Kinzie Kenner as The Sister
- Cherokee as Spirit Guide
- Katie Morgan as Natalie
- Randy Spears as Sheriff
- Manuel Ferrara as Mental Orderly
- Scott Nails as Boyfriend
- Kris Slater as Scott
- Mike Horner as Caretaker/Killer

== Reception ==
A horror movie critic wrote:

...although Daniels has the perfect swollen-sweater-girl look as the blonde ditz, it’s Drake who steals the show as her snarkier and more sensible companion. Among the men, veterans Randy Spears and Mike Horner have both made quite a reputation for their acting within the adult community – in both serious and humorous roles, sex and nonsex – and are as entertaining as expected. Meanwhile, Eric Masterson, the nominal male lead, plays a nebbishy film geek well, and Voodoo has a memorable comic turn as a jock/would-be tough guy.

== Awards and nominations ==
Year	Ceremony	Result	Category	Recipient(s)
2006	AFW Award	Won	Best Comedy	—N/a
2006	AVN Award	Nominated	Best DVD	—N/a
2006	AVN Award	Won	Best Sex Comedy	—N/a
2006	AVN Award	Nominated	Best High-Definition Production	—N/a
2006	AVN Award	Won	Best Supporting Actress - Video	Stormy Daniels
2006	AVN Award	Nominated	Best Supporting Actress - Video	Jessica Drake
2006	AVN Award	Nominated	Best Supporting Actor – Video	Eric Masterson
2006	AVN Award	Nominated	Best Director – Video	Jonathan Morgan
2006	AVN Award	Won	Best Screenplay - Video	Stormy Daniels, Jonathan Morgan & August Warwick
2006	AVN Award	Nominated	Best Art Direction – Video	—N/a
2006	AVN Award	Nominated	Best Videography	—N/a
2006	AVN Award	Nominated	Best Special Effects	—N/a
2006	AVN Award	Won	Best DVD Extras	—N/a
2006	AVN Award	Won	Best DVD Menus	—N/a
2006	AVN Award	Nominated	Best Packaging	—N/a
2006	AVN Award	Nominated	Best Overall Marketing Campaign, Individual Project	—N/a
2006	AVN Award	Nominated	Best On-Line Marketing Campaign	—N/a
2006	XRCO Award	Nominated	Best Release	—N/a
2006	XRCO Award	Won	Best Comedy or Parody	—N/a
2006	XRCO Award	Won	Best DVD Extras	—N/a
2007	Adam Film World Award	Won	Best HD-DVD	—N/a
