= Audrey Hollander =

American pornographic film actress (born 1979)

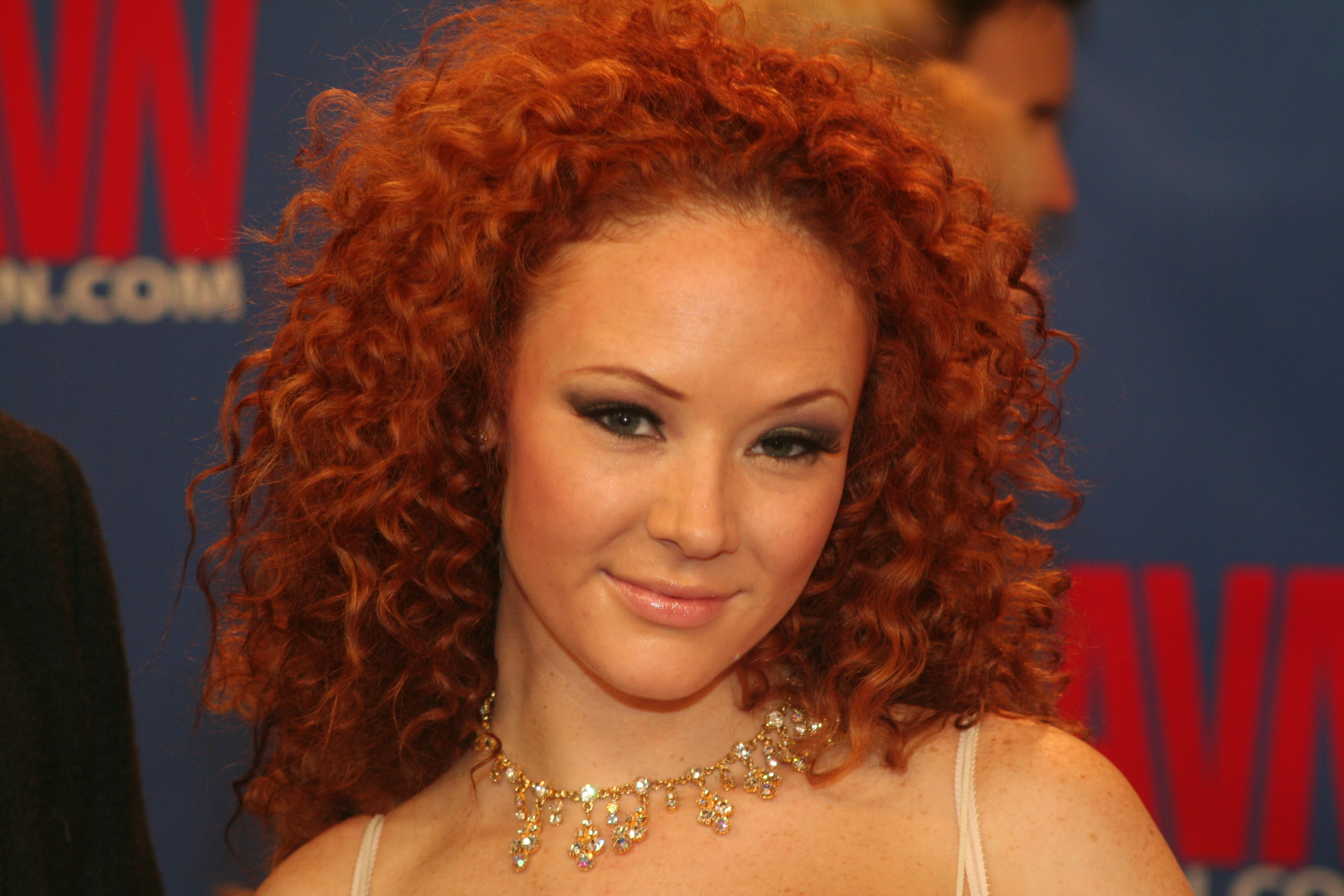
- Hollander in 2006
- Born: November 4, 1979 (age 46)
- Occupation: Pornographic film actress
- Years active: 2002–present
- Spouse: Otto Bauer (divorced)
- Website: theaudreyhollander.com

Audrey Hollander (born November 4, 1979) is an American pornographic film actress. She is a member of the AVN Hall of Fame.

== Career ==
Having entered the pornography industry in 2003, Hollander had starred in more than 200 films as of 2016. She co-directed the film Otto & Audrey Destroy The World (2005) with her then-husband Otto Bauer, and won the AVN Award for Female Performer of the Year in 2006. In 2024, she was inducted into the AVN Hall of Fame.

== Personal life ==
Hollander married pornographic film actor Otto Bauer prior to 2005. They divorced prior to 2015. A pornographic scene between Hollander and Bauer figured in a 2007 obscenity trial against distributors Five Star Video and JM Productions.

== Awards ==
- 2005 AVN Award for Best All-Girl Sex Scene (Video) – The Violation of Audrey Hollander (with Gia Paloma, Ashley Blue, Tyla Wynn, Brodi, & Kelly Kline)
- 2005 XRCO Award for Best Girl/Girl – The Violation of Audrey Hollander
- 2006 AVN Award for Female Performer of the Year
- 2006 AVN Award for Best Group Sex Scene (Video) – Squealer (with Smokie Flame, Jassie, Kimberly Kane, Otto Bauer, Scott Lyons, Kris Slater, & Scott Nails)
- 2006 AVN Award for Best Anal Sex Scene (Film) – Sentenced (with Otto Bauer)
- 2006 Venus Paris Fair / EuroEline Award for Best International Actress
- 2008 AVN Award for Most Outrageous Sex Scene – Ass Blasting Felching Anal Whores (with Cindy Crawford & Rick Masters)
- 2024 AVN Hall of Fame
