= Brad Armstrong (director) =

Canadian pornographic actor and director (born 1965)

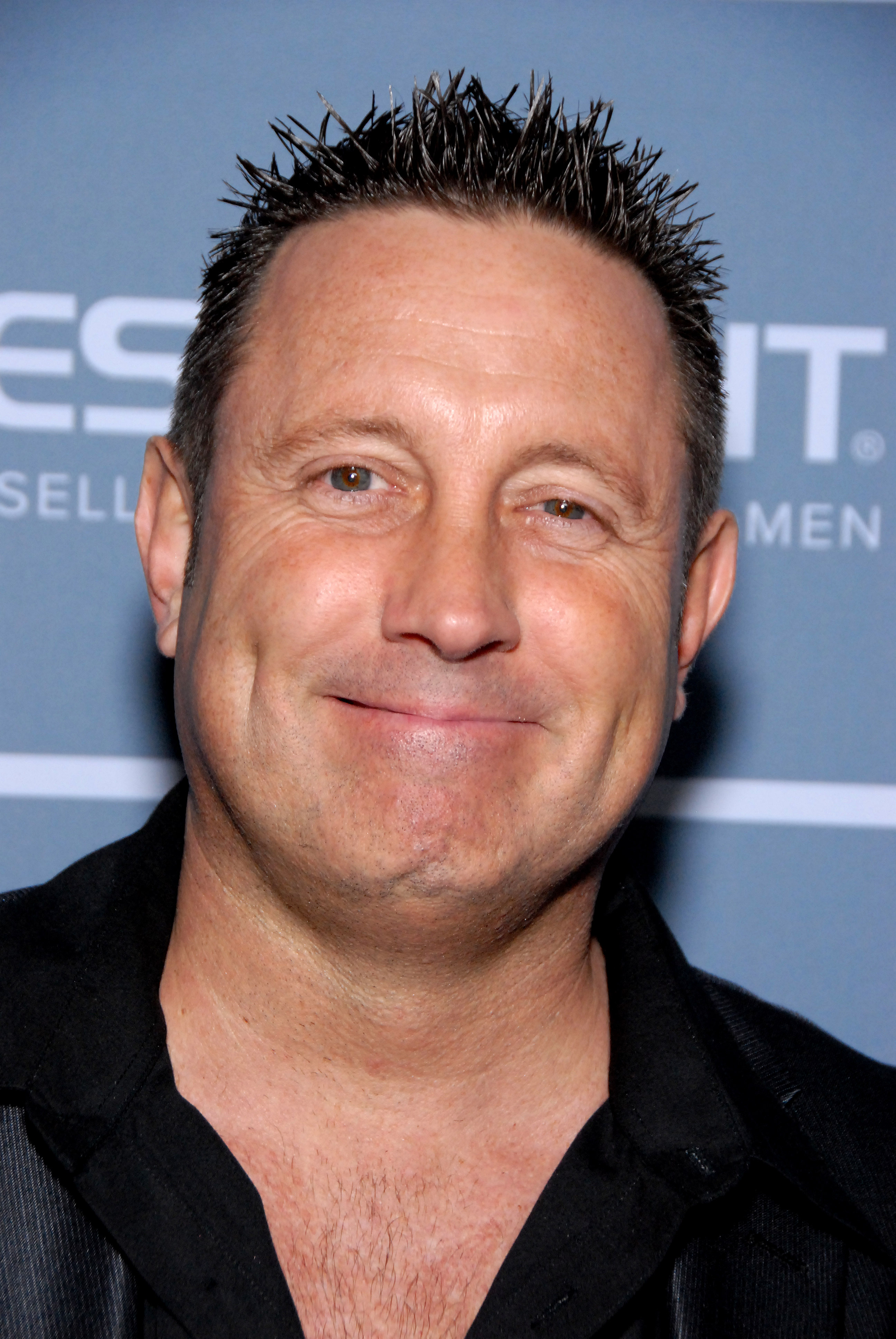
- Armstrong attending the XBIZ Awards Show in Santa Monica, California in 2012
- Born: Rod Hopkins; September 23, 1965 (age 60); Toronto, Ontario, Canada
- Other names: Mr. Magic; Brad Alexander; Armstrong; Rod
- Occupations: Pornographic actor; director; producer; screenwriter
- Years active: 1990–present
- Spouses: Dyanna Lauren (?–1992); Jenna Jameson (1996–2001); Jessica Drake (2006–2021)

Brad Armstrong (born Rod Hopkins; September 23, 1965) is a Canadian pornographic actor, director, producer and screenwriter. He is currently under contract with Wicked Pictures. He has been known as one of the most popular leading men in the sex industry, as well as "The King of Porn" and "The Spielberg of Skin Directors".

Among the films he has directed is Octomom Home Alone (2012).

== Early life ==
Armstrong was born Rod Hopkins on September 23, 1965 in Toronto, Ontario, Canada and attended college for commercial art and advertising.

== Career ==
Armstrong worked as a male stripper in Canada for 10 years. He began dancing at age 17 by borrowing a friend's ID. He was introduced to the porn industry by pornographic actress Erica Boyer. His first scene was a sixway with Erica Boyer, Randy Spears, Eric Price, and two other women for the film Bimbo Bowlers From Boston.

He also had an acting role in Don McKellar's 1992 short film Blue.

== Personal life ==
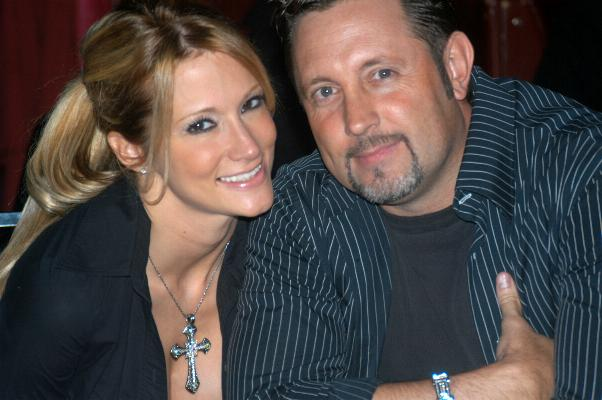
Armstrong and his wife Jessica Drake at the XRCO Awards show in June 2005

Armstrong married Jenna Jameson in December 1996. They divorced in 2001.

== Awards ==
List of awards received by Brad Armstrong
Awards and nominations
Award	Won	Nominated
AVN Awards	21	0
Urban X Awards	1	0
NightMoves Awards	4	0
XBIZ Awards	3	0
XRCO Awards	5	0
- Total number of awards
Totals	34	0

AVN Awards
Year	Award	Film
2002	Best Director - Video	Euphoria
2002	Best Screenplay - Video (shared with David Aaron Clark)	Euphoria
2003	Best Actor - Film	Falling From Grace
2003	Best Screenplay - Film (shared with Daniel Metcalf & Jonathan Morgan)	Falling From Grace
2004	AVN Hall of Fame	—N/a
2005	Best Screenplay, Film	The Collector
2007	Best Director – Film	Manhunters
2007	Best Screenplay – Film	Manhunters
2008	Best Actor, Video	Coming Home
2009	Best Double Penetration Sex Scene (shared with Jessica Drake & Eric Masterson)	Fallen
2009	Director of the Year	—N/a
2010	Best Group Sex Scene (shared with Jessica Drake, Kirsten Price, Alektra Blue, Mikayla Mendez, Kaylani Lei, Tory Lane, Jayden Jaymes, Kayla Carrera, Randy Spears, Rocco Reed, Marcus London, Mick Blue & T.J. Cummings)	2040
2011	Best Director – Feature	Speed
2012	Best Director – Parody	The Rocki Whore Picture Show: A Hardcore Parody
2012	Best Screenplay – Parody (shared with Hank Shenanigan)	The Rocki Whore Picture Show: A Hardcore Parody
2014	Best Director – Feature	Underworld
2014	Best Screenplay	Underworld
2014	Best Safe Sex Scene (shared with Jessica Drake)	Sexpionage: The Drake Chronicles
2015	Best Director – Feature	Aftermath
2015	Best Screenplay	Aftermath
2017	Best Supporting Actor	The Preacher's Daughter

NightMoves Awards
Year	Award
2002	Best Director (Fan's Choice)
2013	Best Director - Non-Parody (Fan's Choice)
2014	Best Director - Feature (Fan's Choice)
2015	Best Director - Feature (Editor's Choice)

Urban X Awards
Year	Award
2011	Best Director, Features

XBIZ Awards
Year	Award	Film
2010	Director of the Year (Individual Project)	2040
2014	Director of the Year - Feature Release	Underworld
2017	Screenplay of the Year	The Preacher's Daughter

XRCO Awards
Year	Award
2007	Best Director - Features
2008	Best Director - Features (tied with Stormy Daniels)
2009	Best Director - Features
2009	XRCO Hall of Fame
2011	Best Director - Features
