= Devinn Lane =

American actress, writer, director and producer

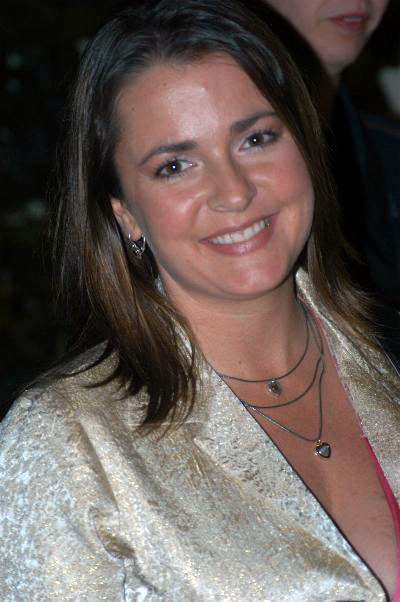
- Lane in 2005
- Other names: Devin Lane; Devon Lane
- Occupations: Adult model; pornographic actress; writer; director; producer

Devinn Lane is a former adult model, pornographic actress, writer, director and producer. She is sometimes credited as Devin Lane or Devon Lane.

== Biography ==
Lane became pregnant at 16 and began stripping to support herself and her child in 1990. In 1996, while still dancing, she was offered work posing in hard-core men's magazines.

== Adult film career ==
She made her hardcore film debut in 1999, performing in only lesbian scenes. She signed an exclusive contract for the production company Wicked Pictures in December 1999. She has directed many films, notably all five installments of The Devinn Lane Show. In 2003, she began performing with men, starting with the final scene in The Devinn Lane Show 5: Save The Best For Last. Over the next two years she performed scenes with men in Kink, Lovestruck, Space Nuts, Improper Conduct, Wicked Sex Party 6, Beautiful, Stiletto, Tuff Chick, two Road Trixx movies (which she also directed), and Lovers Lane.

As of 2005, she went on indefinite hiatus from on-screen work, focusing on directing for the production company Shane's World.

Her first producer credit is on the film Beautiful/Nasty which was nominated for the AVN Award Best All-Girl Feature in 2002.

In addition to hardcore work, Lane also hosted Playboy TV's mock reality show 7 Lives Exposed, which ran for six seasons until 2007, and has appeared in several softcore films which appear on DVD and on the Cinemax channels.

== Lawsuit ==
In October 2008, Lane filed a copyright infringement lawsuit against Digital Playground, Vivid Entertainment Group, and Moniker Online Services among other entities, alleging that they profited from domain names similar to her performer name and did not compensate her. In February 2009, she dismissed her claims against most of the companies, leaving only Privacy Protect and Pixel named in the suit.

== Notable TV guest appearances ==
- Thrills playing "Denise" in episode: "A Most Dangerous Desire" (episode # 1.2), June 9, 2001
- The Helmetcam Show playing "Herself – Guest" (episode # 5.1), July 5, 2000
- The Man Show playing "Herself" in episode: "Wheel of Destiny" (episode # 2.3), July 2, 2000
- The Helmetcam Show playing "Herself – Guest" (episode # 4.17), May 17, 2000
- The Helmetcam Show playing "Herself – Guest" (episode # 4.8), December 1, 1999
- The Howard Stern Radio Show playing "Herself", October 16, 1999

== Awards and nominations ==
Year	Ceremony	Result	Category	Work
2000	AVN Award	Nominated	Best All-Girl Sex Scene, Film (with Devon & Maya Divine)	Three
2001	AVN Award	Nominated	Best Actress - Video	Spellbound
2001	AVN Award	Won	Best Solo Sex Scene	In Style
2001	Hot d'Or Award	Nominated	Best American New Starlet	—N/a
2002	AVN Award	Nominated	Best All-Girl Sex Scene - Video (with Inari Vachs)	Love Shack
2002	AVN Award	Nominated	Best Solo Sex Scene	Love Shack
2002	Venus Award	Nominated	Best Actress (USA)	—N/a
2003	AVN Award	Nominated	Female Performer of the Year	—N/a
2003	AVN Award	Nominated	Best Supporting Actress – Video	Turning Point
2003	AVN Award	Nominated	Best All-Girl Sex Scene – Video (with Wanda Curtis)	After Hours
2003	AVN Award	Nominated	Best All-Girl Sex Scene – Video (with April)	Breathless
2003	AVN Award	Won	Best Actress - Video	Breathless
2003	XRCO Award	Nominated	Best Girl-Girl Scene (with April)	Breathless
2004	AVN Award	Nominated	Female Performer of the Year	—N/a
2004	AVN Award	Nominated	Best Supporting Actress – Video	Space Nuts
2004	AVN Award	Nominated	Best Actress – Video	Improper Conduct
2004	AVN Award	Nominated	Best All-Girl Sex Scene – Video (with Bridgette Kerkove)	Improper Conduct
2004	XRCO Award	Nominated	Best Girl/Girl Scene (with Bridgette Kerkove)	Improper Conduct
2004	XRCO Award	Nominated	Female Performer of the Year	—N/a
2006	AVN Award	Nominated	Best Actress – Video	Lovers Lane
