= Lupe Fuentes =

Colombian house music producer, DJ, and former pornographic actress

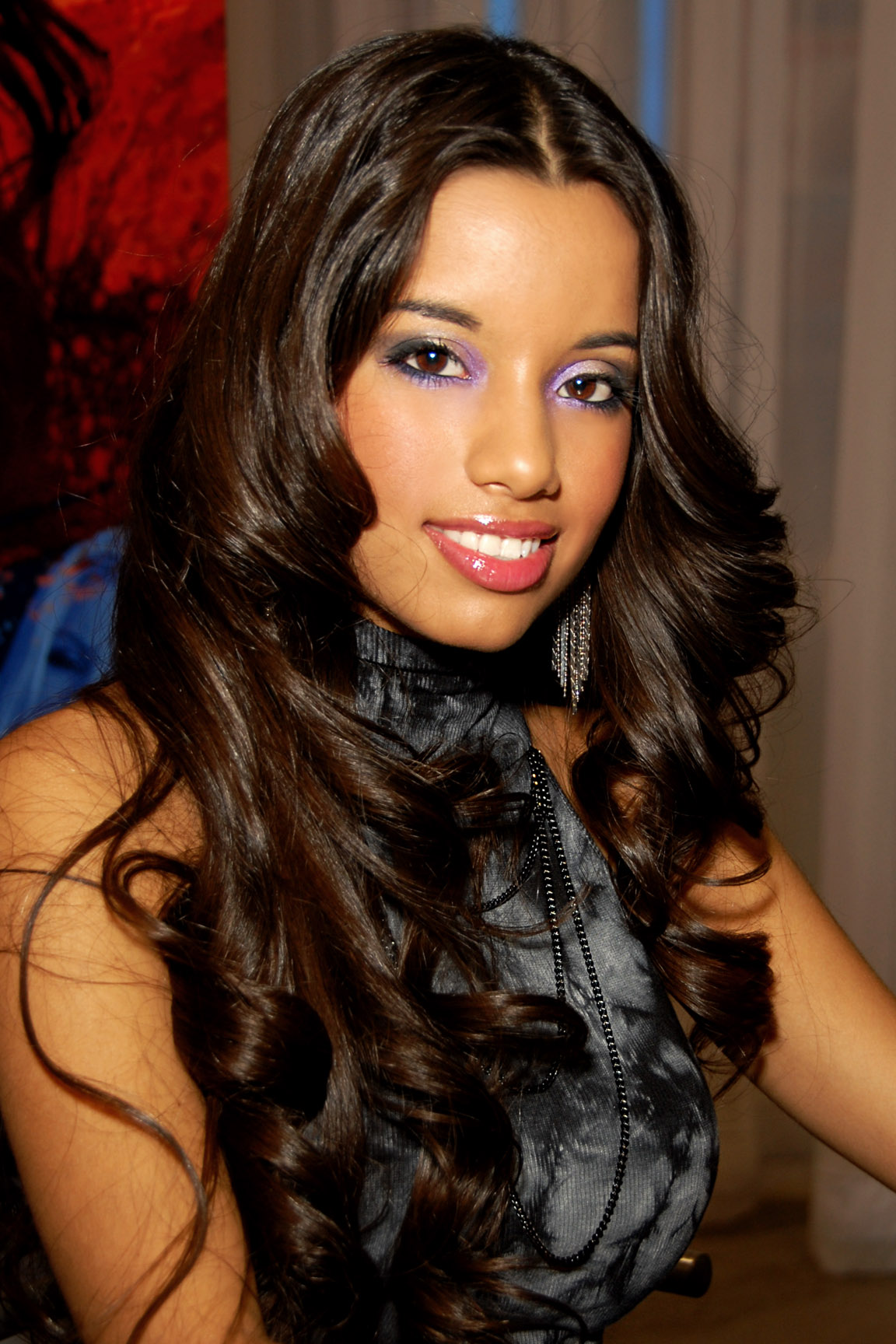
- Fuentes in 2010

Background information
- Born: Cali, Colombia
- Genre: House
- Occupations: Producer; DJ; former pornographic actress
- Years active: 2006–2010 (actress); 2010–present
- Labels: Brobot; Undercool; Defined; Nervous; Inhouse; WHO_REads
- Spouse: Pablo Lapiedra (m. 2006; div. 2009) Evan Seinfeld (m. 2011; div. 2020)
- Website: lupefuentes.com

Lupe Fuentes, also known as Little Lupe, is a Colombian house music producer, DJ, and former pornographic actress.

== Early life and adult film career ==
Fuentes was born in Colombia and grew up in Madrid, Spain. She entered the adult film industry in 2007, after launching her own amateur website. She initially shot her scenes in Spain, but later moved to the United States.

In 2009, federal agents arrested a man in Puerto Rico on suspicion of possessing child pornography that included Fuentes. During the trial, a pediatrician testified, using the Tanner scale, that Fuentes appeared to be underage. The defense subpoenaed Fuentes to present her passport, which confirmed that she was 19 years old at the time of production.

== Musical career ==
Fuentes began her music career in 2010. Her music is influenced by her Latin roots and the house music she heard in the streets and the nightclubs in Spain. In 2012, Fuentes became the lead singer of The Ex-Girlfriends, a pop group. They released two singles: "We Are The Party" released on 6 November 2012 and "Whatchya Looking At?" released on 18 March 2013. The singles were aggressively promoted through social media and with pop-up ads, which inflated to the YouTube view count by automatically loading the videos for each song.

She played her opening gig at Exchange LA in February 2014 in Los Angeles, California. She headlined Drai's Afterhours the following month in Las Vegas, Nevada. In spring 2014, she released So High – her first single – on Brobot Records. Her second single, Don't Hold Back, was released on Undercool Productions. She is mentored by Roger Sanchez, a Grammy Award winning DJ and music producer, Junior Sanchez, a record producer and founder of Brobot Records, and DJ Todd Terry. Fuentes has also released tracks on Defined Music, Nervous and Inhouse. In June 2014, Fuentes opened for Oscar G at Pacha NYC. In December 2014, she released Get Down, a collaboration with Darryl McDaniels. In an interview with DJ Magazine, she described her music and the collaboration: "When I am making tracks, they have to pass the dance floor test and they have to be funky [...] having an opportunity to put my name alongside DMC from RUN DMC is just over the top." In May 2016, she appeared in Riff Raff's video Carlos Slim.

== Personal life ==
As of 2014, Fuentes lived in Los Angeles, California where she worked as a DJ. She was married to musician and porn actor Evan Seinfeld from 2011 to 2020.

== Adult film awards ==
=== Won ===
- 2010: F.A.M.E. Award – Favorite New Starlet
- 2010: XFANZ Award – Latina Pornstar of the Year

=== Nominations ===
- 2006 FICEB Award – Best New Spanish Actress (Posesió)
- 2009 Hot d'Or – Best European Actress (100% Zuleidy)
- 2010 AVN Award – Best New Web Starlet
- 2011 XBIZ Award – Female Performer of the Year
- 2011 XRCO Award – Cream Dream
