= Squealer (2005 film) =

2005 film by Jack the Zipper

- DVD released by Hustler Video
- Directed by: Jack the Zipper
- Produced by: Larry Flynt
- Starring: Jassie; Kris Slater; Scott Nails; Otto Bauer; Alec Knight; Scott Lyons; Felix Vicious; Smokie Flame; Kimberly Kane; Audrey Hollander
- Edited by: Jack the Zipper
- Music by: Roy Batty; Jack the Zipper
- Distributed by: Hustler Video
- Release date: July 25, 2005 (United States)
- Running time: 116 minutes
- Country: United States
- Language: English

Squealer is a 2005 pornographic horror film directed by Jack the Zipper.

== Plot ==
A quartet of women on a road trip experience car trouble, and seek shelter in a seemingly abandoned farmhouse, where they have an orgy. The girls are interrupted mid-coitus by the home's owners, a group of hillbilly cousins who make the travellers have sex with them. Afterward, two of the women are tied to chairs and placed in a boathouse, though one of them manages to free herself, and undo her companion's ropes. While those two have sex, they are spied on by three of the rednecks, who eventually join them.

Outside, one of the girls has been tied up and placed in the back of a truck. While her abductor digs a grave, the woman tries to make a run for it, but she is quickly recaptured. The girl is taken back to the house, where she and two of her friends (one of whom is placed in a swing) are used for sex. Next, a female member of the backwoods clan has sex with one of the girls, choking her and suffocating her with a bag during the act.

Another orgy occurs, this time involving two men and two women, the latter being urinated on before the sex begins. After one of the hillbillies climaxes, the film abruptly ends, with the women presumably still being held prisoner in the farmhouse.

== Cast ==
- Otto Bauer as Digger
- Smokie Flame as Pinup #1
- Audrey Hollander as Pinup #2
- Jassie as Pinup #3
- Kimberly Kane as Pinup #4
- Alec Knight as Cousin #1
- Scott Lyons as Cousin #2
- Scott Nails as Cousin #3
- Kris Slater as Cousin #4
- Felix Vicious as Pinup #5

== Reception ==
AVN gave Squealer a four and a half out of five, stating: "it's unrelentingly filthy, full of dirt-streaked bodies, d.p.s, double anal, slapping, tying, gagging, spitting, asphyxiation, you name it. It's also a masterpiece, porn's answer (in a true sense, not a parodic one) to The Texas Chain Saw Massacre" and "The look, the mood, the music... it's all pitch-perfect. And unlike anyone else's stuff. Jack the Zipper has slaughtered again". A positive review was also given by Fleshbot, which described the film as "an intense little movie" that was spookily and artfully shot.

A two out of five was awarded by XCritic, which admitted that while the film succeeded at being atmospheric, artistic and creepy it was still "just plain repulsive" and "like something serial killers use to push them over the edge into orgasm land while fantasizing about slaughter". Box Magazine was also critical of Squealer, finding most of the sex unerotic, and the horror element almost non-existent.

=== Awards ===
Squealer won in the categories Best All-Sex Release - Video, Best Group Sex Scene - Video, and Best Oral Sex Scene - Video at the 2006 AVN Awards.
