= Taryn Thomas =

American actress

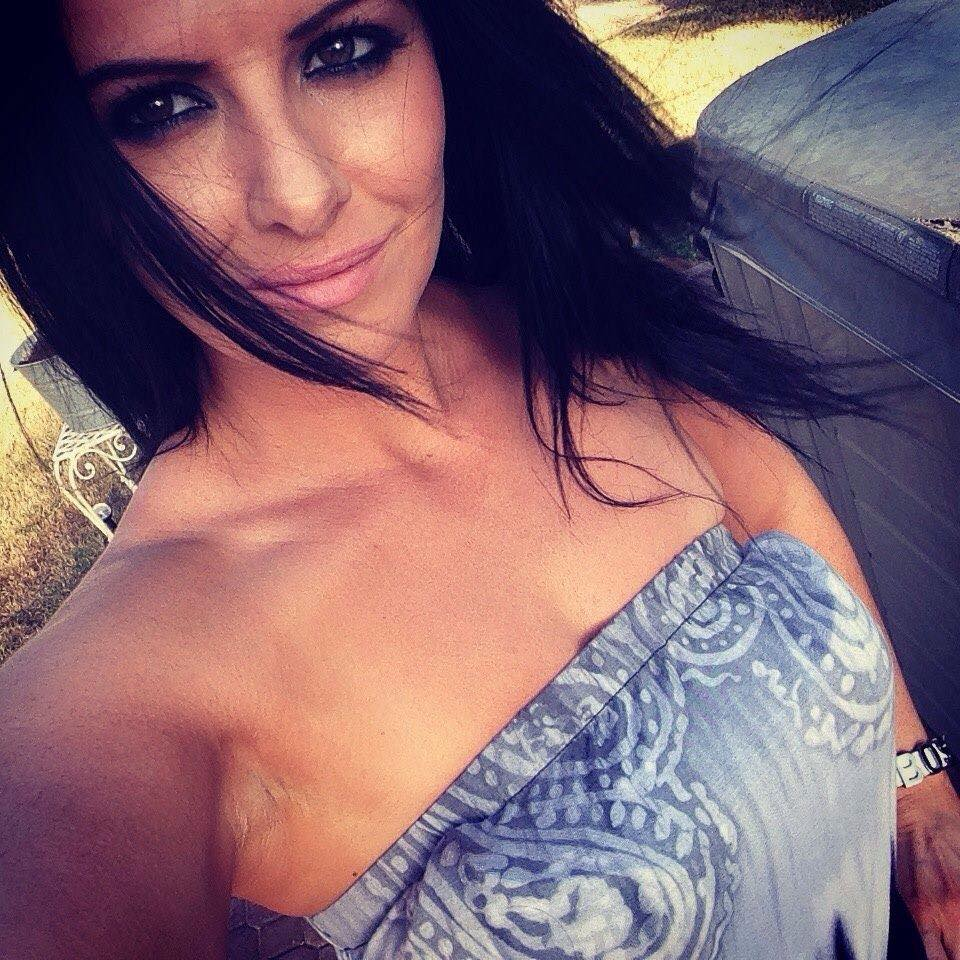
- Thomas in 2014
- Born: Jersey City, New Jersey, U.S.
- Occupations: Pornographic actress; director; men's club feature dancer; model

Taryn Thomas is an American pornographic actress, director, men's club feature dancer, and model.

== Career ==
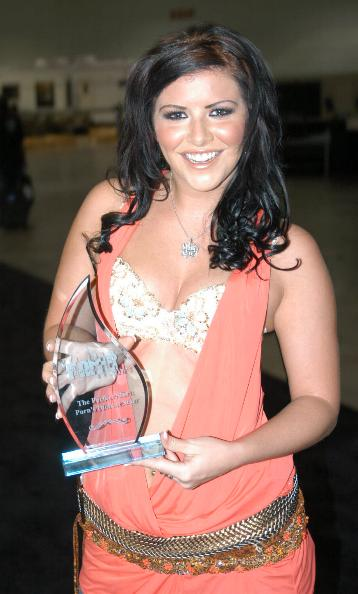
Taryn Thomas holding her F.A.M.E. Award for "Dirtiest Girl in Porn" (2006)

Upon turning 18 years old, Thomas began working for Lightspeed Media Corporation doing internet photo shoots and softcore pornography (a total of about twenty appearances). In late 2004, Thomas traveled to Southern California with the intention of pursuing a career in hardcore pornography. 12 on 1 #2 by Lethal Hardcore was the first DVD that Thomas shot in California, and it featured her performing with Penny Flame, Sandra Romain, and Melissa Lauren.

Thomas was nominated for several AVN Awards in 2006, including Best New Starlet. She has also appeared on the Howard Stern Show multiple times and participated in the "Pornstar Beauty Pageant," competing against Taylor Wane and Carmen Luvana. She played the parody role of Snooki in Jersey Shore XXX in 2010.

=== Injury and temporary retirement ===
After an injury performing, Thomas gained weight and took her departure from the adult film industry. During this period, Thomas stated that she became addicted to drugs. She sought help for her addiction, and, once she was clean and sober, Thomas announced her return to the adult film industry in May 2007. Since then, she has starred in several different films and has been documenting her career on her blog. She has been retired from performing since 2012.

=== Appearances ===
Thomas has appeared in a Penthouse magazine pictorial and several online galleries. She has also appeared in several men's magazines, such as Maxim, FHM, and others, and she had her debut as a feature dancer at a gentlemen's club in Phoenix in 2005.

=== Other ventures ===
In October 2009, Thomas released Vogue Nasty, her first video under her production company, Taryn It Up Entertainment.

=== Advocacy ===
In a 2012 interview with a CBS affiliate in Phoenix while attending a convention, Thomas stated her concerns about the effects of Measure B, which mandated the use of condoms in all pornographic productions in Los Angeles County. Thomas was quoted as saying, "Over the three or four days the companies and performers are here, they're definitely going to be scoping out Arizona" as a new potential place to shoot scenes. She also stated, "We are some of the most tested people in the world. I think I can speak for most of the performers. We're not anti-condom. We're pro-choice," and expressed the sentiment that the government should not be inspecting her genitalia, and she stressed the safety of the current testing conditions.

== Personal life ==
Thomas was born in Jersey City, New Jersey and resides in Phoenix, Arizona. She is of Italian descent.

During her temporary retirement, Thomas gained weight and took time to study cosmetology She committed to reversing her weight gain and eventually met her weight loss goal in order to return to the adult film industry. In addition to her cosmetology studies, Thomas has also attended real estate school and has a pharmacy technician's license. In this period, Thomas kept a blog documenting her weight loss efforts.

== Awards ==
- 2006 F.A.M.E. Award – Dirtiest Girl in Porn
- 2006 NightMoves Award – Best New Starlet (Editor's Choice)
