= Wicked Pictures =

American pornographic production company based in Canoga Park, California

- Type: Private
- Industry: Pornography
- Genre: Adult
- Founded: 1993; 33 years ago
- Founder: Steve Orenstein
- Headquarters: Canoga Park, California, U.S.
- Area served: Worldwide
- Key people: Axel Braun
- Products: Pornographic films
- Owner: Gamma Entertainment
- Website: www.wicked.com

Wicked Pictures is an American independent pornographic movie studio headquartered in Canoga Park, California. Between 2004 and 2021, it was one of the only heterosexual studios to maintain a condoms-only policy.

== Company history ==
Steve Orenstein founded Wicked Pictures in 1993, after developing an interest in creative aspects of film production while a partner in his previous adult company, X-Citement Video. During its first year, Wicked won industry awards and Orenstein signed Chasey Lain as the first "Wicked Girl". The second Wicked Girl, Jenna Jameson, signed in 1995. Under Wicked's promotion, Jameson became the only winner of AVN Awards for Best New Starlet, Best Actress, and Best Sex Scene in the same year.

Wicked won the first high-definition Adult Video News Award for Camp Cuddly Pines Powertool Massacre in December 2006. The movie went on to win several AVN Awards in 2007.

In October 2010, Wicked stopped production when an actor tested positive for HIV.

The studio agreed with Manwin to run its websites in December 2010. In December 2020, it was announced that founder and president Steve Orenstein had sold the company to Gamma Entertainment, and that the new ownership had named Axel Braun Head of Production.

The company was discussed in the criminal trial of People of the State of New York v. Trump. It hosted a golf hole at a celebrity golf tournament in Lake Tahoe. Actresses from Wicked Pictures greeted the golfers as they played through at the hole. Donald Trump met Stormy Daniels at such an event, and the two had a sexual encounter.

In November 2024, it was discovered that the packaging of dolls produced by Mattel based on the film Wicked inadvertently linked to the Wicked Pictures website (www.wicked.com) instead of the film's official website (www.wickedmovie.com) due to similarities in their links. Mattel apologized for the error and asked parents who had bought products with the incorrect website to destroy the packaging.

== Awards ==
The following is a selection of major awards Wicked films have won:

- 1994 AVN Award - Best Video Feature (Haunted Nights)
- 1996 AVN Award - Best Film (Blue Movie)
- 1998 AVN Award - Best Vignette Release (Heart & Soul)
- 2001 AVN Award - Top Selling Release of the Year (Dream Quest)
- 2001 AVN Award - Top Renting Release of the Year (Dream Quest)
- 2002 AVN Award - Best Video Feature (Euphoria)
- 2003 AVN Award - Best DVD (Euphoria)
- 2004 AVN Award - Best Video Feature (Beautiful)
- 2007 AVN Award - Best Film (Manhunters)
- 2008 AVN Award - Best Sex Comedy (Operation: Desert Stormy)
- 2010 XBIZ Award - Peoples Choice Porn Studio of the Year
- 2011 XBIZ Award - Feature Studio of the Year
- 2011 XBIZ Award - Feature Movie of the Year (Speed)
- 2012 XBIZ Award - Best Art Direction (The Rocki Whore Picture Show: A Hardcore Parody)
- 2012 XBIZ Award - Specialty Release of the Year (Jessica Drake's Guide to Wicked Sex: Anal Edition)
- 2012 XBIZ Award - All-Black Release of the Year (A Touch of Seduction)
- 2012 XBIZ Award - European Feature Release of the Year (Les Filles de la Campagne)
- 2013 AVN Award - Best Celebrity Sex Tape (Octomom Home Alone)
- 2013 XBIZ Award - Parody Release of the Year - Drama (Inglorious Bitches)
- 2013 XBIZ Award - All-Girl Release of the Year (Girls With Girls)
- 2014 XBIZ Award - Feature Movie of the Year (Underworld)
- 2014 XBIZ Award - Best Cinematography (Underworld)
- 2014 XBIZ Award - Best Art Direction (Underworld)
- 2014 XBIZ Award - Best Special Effects (Underworld)
- 2014 XBIZ Award - Best Editing (Underworld)
- 2015 XBIZ Award - Parody Release of the Year - Drama (Cinderella XXX: An Axel Braun Parody)
- 2015 XBIZ Award - Best Actress/Parody: Jessica Drake, (Snow White XXX: An Axel Braun Parody)
- 2015 AVN Award - Best Supporting Actress: Veronica Avluv, (Cinderella XXX: An Axel Braun Parody)
- 2016 XBIZ Award - Parody Release of the Year (Batman v. Superman XXX: An Axel Braun Parody)

== Wicked Girls ==
- Chasey Lain (1993–1995)
- Jenna Jameson (1995–2000)
- Serenity (1996–2001)
- Missy (1997–1999)
- Stephanie Swift (1997–2002)
- Temptress (1998–2000)
- Devinn Lane (2000–2005)
- Sydnee Steele (2001–2003)
- Julia Ann (20012004, 2006–2007)
- Keri Sable (2005)
- Carmen Hart (2005–2007)
- Kirsten Price (2005–2012)
- Mikayla Mendez (2008–2009) – first Latina contract performer for the studio
- Lupe Fuentes (2010–2011)
- Alektra Blue (2008–2013)
- Kaylani Lei (2003–2005, 2007–2015)
- Carter Cruise (2015–2018)
- Asa Akira (2013–2018)
- Stormy Daniels (2002–2018, 2022–2023)
- Jessica Drake (2003–2021)

== Ranking ==
As of October 2021, Wicked Pictures has a traffic ranking of 81,588.
