= Kimberly Kane =

American pornographic film actress

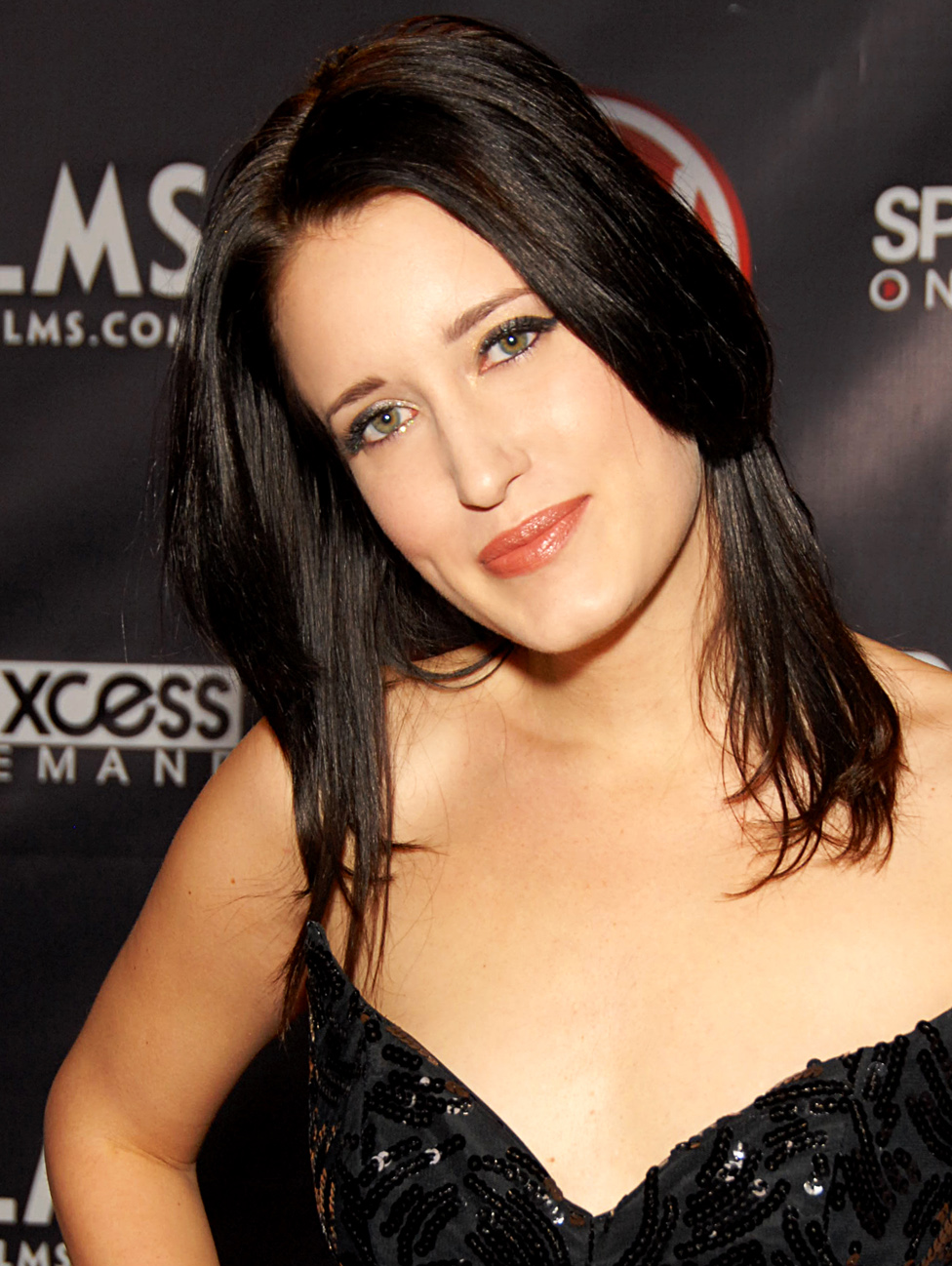
- Kane in 2010
- Occupation: Pornographic film actress
- Website: kanearmy.com

Kimberly Kane is an American pornographic film actress.

== Career ==
Kane begin working in mainstream pornography in 2004. In 2006, she directed her first movie for Pulse Pictures entitled Naked and Famous, which received a 5-out-of-5-star review from AVN Magazine. Shortly after, Vivid Entertainment approached Kane to direct for their Vivid-Alt branch.

After she made her directorial debut with Naked and Famous for Pulse Distribution, she went on to direct Triple Ecstasy, Morphine, and Live In My Secrets, three alt porn films produced by Vivid Entertainment.

Kane used Super 8mm film and mixed media in her videos. In 2009, Kane was cast to play Dana Scully in New Sensations' The Sex Files, and won the 2010 Best Actress AVN Award.

In 2012, Kane, along with some of her adult film colleagues, was featured in Maxim Magazine after doing a campaign with The Escapist. Kane also continued to pursue her love of photography. In 2012, her writing and photography were published twice in Vice Magazine, one of which being a portrait series entitled "Girls of Hollywood". Dian Hanson selected Kane's photography for Taschen's book The New Erotic Photographer Book Vol. 2. Kane also appeared as a cover model for Taschen's Big Book of Pussy.

In 2013, Kane was a lead actress in two Wonder Woman-themed porn parodies by Axel Braun, and one of them won her Best Sex Scene at the XBIZ Awards. Photos of Kane in the Wonder Woman costume went viral on social and mainstream media. Kane later participated in a charity auction where the costume sold to fund the Free Speech Coalition.

In 2015, Kane signed on as host of Viceland/Munchies Sex+Food, a TV show that explores food fetishes, feeder/feedee, sploshing, food play, and food products related to sex.

== Advocacy ==
On March 22, 2010, Kane participated in an anti-piracy public service announcement for the Free Speech Coalition. In the 2012 United States presidential election, Kane voiced her support for President Barack Obama, stating that she agreed with his views on women's issues, health care, and gay rights.

In 2013, Kane was approached by a group of fellow adult industry performers who were forming an advocacy group for adult performers. Kane, known for her strong opposition against Measure B 'The Condom Law,' was a founding member of the organization that would become APAC (Adult Performers Advocacy Committee). Kane acted as Treasurer for APAC and co-wrote Porn 101, an informative video for anyone wanting to join the adult film industry.

== Awards ==
- 2006 AVN Award – Best Group Sex Scene, Video – Squealer
- 2006 AVN Award – Best Oral Sex Scene, Video – Squealer
- 2006 NightMoves Award – Best New Director (Editor's Choice)
- 2009 AVN Award – Best All-Girl 3-Way Sex Scene – Belladonna's Girl Train
- 2010 AVN Award – Best Actress – The Sex Files: A Dark XXX Parody
- 2010 XBIZ Award – Acting Performance of the Year, Female – The Sex Files: A Dark XXX Parody
- 2010 XRCO Award – Single Performance, Actress – The Sex Files: A Dark XXX Comedy
- 2011 AVN Award – Best Three-Way Sex Scene (G/G/B) – The Condemned
- 2011 XRCO Award – Best Actress – The Sex Files 2: A Dark XXX Parody
- 2011 Feminist Porn Award – Honourable Mention – My Own Master
- 2016 AVN Hall of Fame
- 2016 XBIZ Award – Best Sex Scene, Parody Release – Wonder Woman XXX: An Axel Braun Parody
