= Jessica Drake =

American pornographic film actress and sex educator

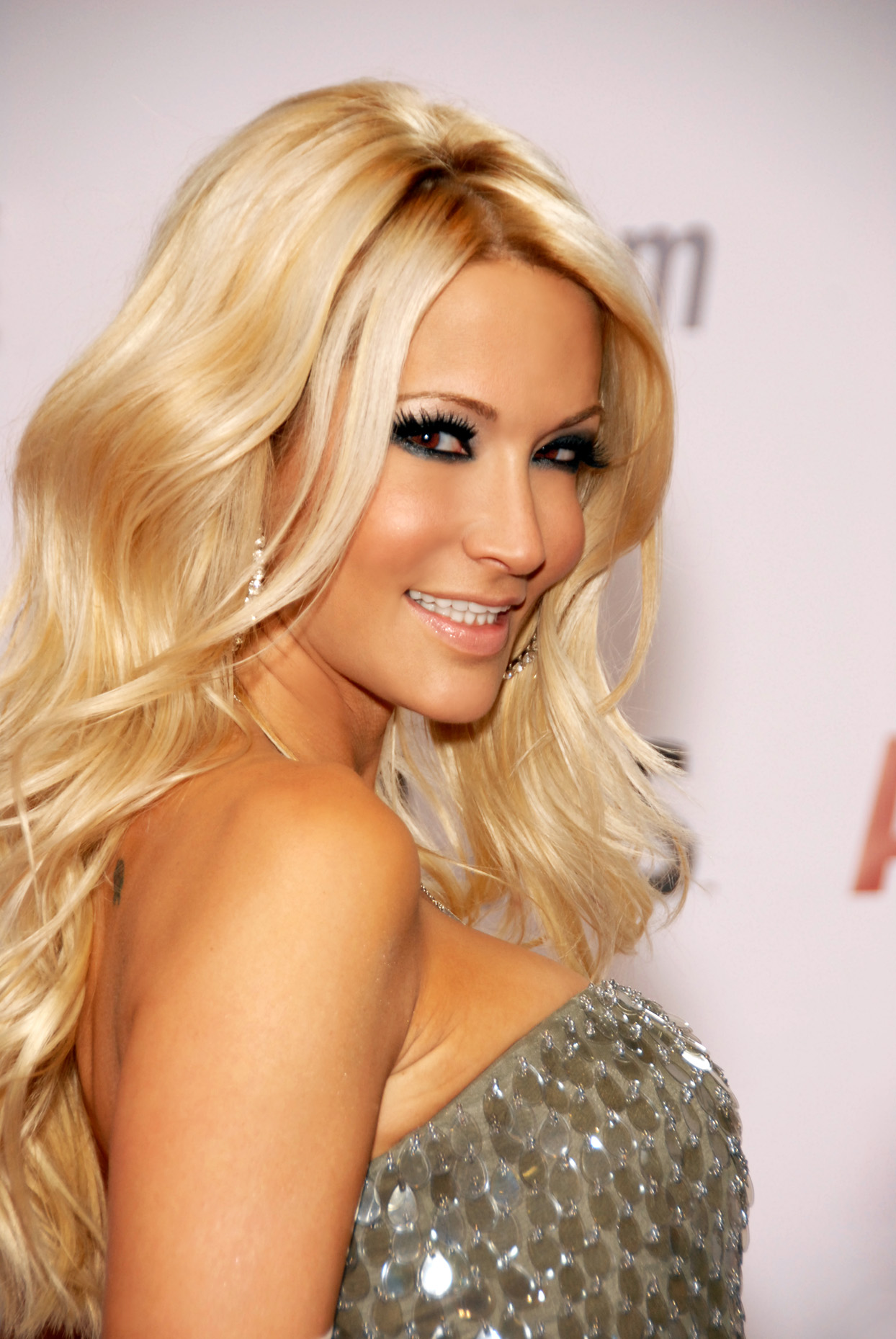
- Drake in 2011
- Born: San Antonio, Texas, U.S.
- Occupations: Pornographic film actress; sex educator
- Spouses: Evan Stone (m. 2002; div. 2004) Brad Armstrong (m. 2006; div. 2021)
- Website: jessicadrake.com

Jessica Drake is an American pornographic film actress and sex educator.

== Career ==
Drake spent two years as a contract performer for the studio Sin City until May 31, 2002, when her contract expired. She gained her first AVN Award in 2001, winning "Best Tease Performance" for her role in VCA Pictures' Shayla's Web. In 2003, she signed an exclusive contract with Wicked Pictures.

In 2004, during an HIV outbreak in the industry, she stated that she had only performed with men who wore condoms, although she added that "working without condoms in the industry is less dangerous than going home with someone who you just met randomly in a bar."

Her performance in Fluff and Fold, a romantic comedy set around a laundromat, earned her the 2005 AVN Award for Best Actress, Video and the 2005 XRCO Award for Single Performance, Actress. Along with comedian Jim Norton, Drake was chosen to co-host the 2007 AVN Awards, and stated "this is probably the greatest thing that ever happened to me." At the awards, she won Best Actress, Film for her role in Manhunters, for which Drake trained as a bounty hunter during pre-production. Her directorial debut came in the 2008 film What Girls Like, having gained previous experience working as Brad Armstrong's assistant director on titles such as 2007's Coming Home.

She began writing screenplays during her tenure with Sin City, and has since penned films including Dating 101, Love Always and Just Between Us. In January 2009, she won her third Best Actress AVN Award, this time for her performance in Fallen, which she has described as "the best movie I have ever been in." In the film, she plays an angel trapped on Earth after the death of a woman she was sent to protect. Around the time of the awards, she suffered a stress fracture to her left foot.

With porn actress Kayden Kross, Drake co-hosted the 2009 XRCO Awards, at which her role in Fallen won the award for "Single Performance, Actress." She and Sunny Leone co-hosted the F.A.M.E. Awards in July 2010. Drake was inducted into the AVN Hall of Fame in 2010 and the XRCO Hall of Fame in 2011. Jessica Drake's Guide to Wicked Sex: Anal Edition (Wicked Pictures) was named "Specialty Release of the Year" at the 2012 XBIZ Awards.

On October 21, 2016, Drake opened an online store selling adult videos and sexual paraphernalia.

=== Appearances ===
In November 2007, Drake was among several porn actors to be guests on The Tyra Banks Show episode, "A Day in the Life of a Porn Star." In 2008, Drake, Kaylani Lei, and Mikayla Mendez shot a scene for the mainstream comedy movie, Barry Munday, in which they played themselves as judges in an air-guitar contest. Drake appears in the music video for the 2010 single "Telephone" by Lady Gaga featuring Beyoncé.

In 2014, Drake was on CNBC's list of "The Dirty Dozen: Porn's Most Popular Stars". Later in the year a documentary series began airing on The Movie Network and Movie Central titled Love, Jessica, directed by Kai Soremekun.

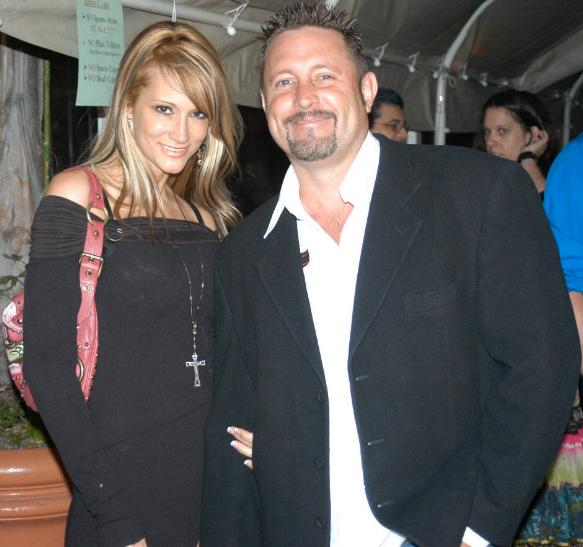
Jessica Drake and her then-husband Brad Armstrong in 2006

Drake, along with her then husband, actor and director, Brad Armstrong, were interviewed for a 2014 story in Cosmopolitan magazine about costume design in adult films. In April 2014, Drake was part of discussion panel at the USC School of Cinematic Arts titled "The Piracy of Sex." The event featured Drake and copyright enforcement activist Nate Glass and was hosted by David Lerner.

=== Charity ===
Drake is affiliated with an organization that focuses on building homes and providing clean water to people in poverty-stricken and remote areas. She has performed charity work in Cambodia, Kenya and Tanzania. In 2012, Drake formed a 501(c)(3) non-profit to assist in domestic efforts. This is separate from her role in the adult industry and the "jessica drake" brand, since she does not want anyone to believe that she volunteers her time as part of a public relations campaign. Her charity work is done anonymously.

=== Sex educator ===
Noting a demand for modern sex education, Drake and Wicked Pictures launched Jessica Drake's Guide to Wicked Sex, a series of erotic educational films. The first DVD in the line, Jessica Drake's Guide to Wicked Sex: Fellatio, was honored with the 2012 award for Best Educational Release by AVN Media. In 2014 Drake added a video to the series that addressed a segment that she said was under represented, plus size. In collaboration with plus-size performer Kelly Shibari, they released Jessica Drake's Guide to Wicked Sex: Plus Size. "Guide to Wicked Sex" was also a weekly segment on Jessica's popular Playboy Radio show, IN BED with jessica drake.

Drake teaches sex education seminars and workshops around the world, including addressing a class of licensed therapists at UCLA on May 3, 2012 and speaking on a panel at CatalystCon West sexuality conference. In February 2014, Drake spoke on a panel with fellow actress Tasha Reign during the University of Chicago's Sex Week where they were featured on a panel entitled Jessica Drake: From Porn to Sex Ed.

Again in February, Drake along with Reign spoke on a panel titled Porn, Prostitution, and Censorship: The Politics of Empowerment at Moore Hall at the University of California at Los Angeles (UCLA), along with UCLA Distinguished Lecturer Dr. Christopher Mott. The annual panel is sponsored by the Social Awareness Network for Activism through Art (SANAA) in honor of Eve Ensler's V-Day Organization. Ensler's The Vagina Monologues is an annual presentation on women's issues.

== Sexual misconduct allegations against Donald Trump ==
Seventeen days before the 2016 United States presidential election, Drake became the 11th woman to accuse Donald Trump, the 2016 Republican nominee, of sexual misconduct. On October 22, 2016, Drake and feminist civil rights attorney Gloria Allred held a news conference in which Drake accused Trump of having sexually assaulted her and two acquaintances nearly ten years prior. Drake said that she met Trump at the Wicked Pictures' (her employers') booth in a gifting suite during the American Century Celebrity Golf Tournament, a charity golf tournament at Edgewood Tahoe Golf Course Lake Tahoe in 2006. Drake claims that she was invited to meet with Trump, at his hotel suite and since she was "uncomfortable going alone" she brought along two women friends. Describing the meeting with Trump, Drake recounted that "He grabbed each of us tightly, in a hug and kissed each one of us without asking permission." Drake stated that she and her friends left the suite after 30–45 minutes. Shortly thereafter, Drake received multiple phone calls from Trump or his associate, requesting that she join him in his suite for $10,000, and offering to fly her on his jet plane back to Los Angeles. She said she declined his offers. At the press conference, Drake displayed a photo of herself and Trump together on the Lake Tahoe golf course.

During the news conference, Drake said, "I am not looking for monetary compensation. I do not need additional fame [...] I understand that I may be called a liar or an opportunist but I will risk that in order to stand in solidarity with women who share similar accounts." In response to Drake's allegations, the Trump campaign stated that her story is "false and ridiculous", that "[t]he picture is one of thousands taken out of respect for people asking to have their picture taken with Mr. Trump" but Trump did not know Drake and "would have no interest in ever knowing her," and that the story was "just another attempt by the Clinton campaign to defame a candidate".

In January 2018, Drake's publicist, Josh Ortiz, commented that Drake had signed a non-disclosure agreement regarding "any and every mention of Trump". On the following day, Ortiz however retracted his words by reading a statement supplied by Drake's lawyer, which stated that Ortiz had no knowledge of any non-disclosure agreement signed by Drake.

== Personal life ==
In 2002, Drake married fellow pornographic film actor Evan Stone, whom she divorced in 2004. She later lived with Wicked director and performer Brad Armstrong, her partner for over a decade. In 2021, she mentioned in a Twitter Q&A session that she and Armstrong had separated and were single again. She has said that her brother and father were more supportive of her career choice than her mother.

== Awards ==
- 2001 AVN Award – Best Tease Performance – Shayla's Web
- 2002 NightMoves Award – Best Actress (Editor's Choice)
- 2005 AVN Award – Best Oral Sex Scene, Film – The Collector
- 2005 AVN Award – Best Actress, Video – Fluff and Fold
- 2005 XRCO Award – Single Performance, Actress – Fluff and Fold
- 2006 Temptation Award – Best Actress, Video – Curse Eternal
- 2006 Eroticline Award – Best Actress, USA
- 2007 AVN Award – Best Actress, Film – Manhunters
- 2007 AVN Award – Best All-Girl Scene, Film – FUCK
- 2008 Eroticline Award – Award for Outstanding Achievements
- 2009 AVN Award – Best Actress – Fallen
- 2009 AVN Award – Best Double Penetration Sex Scene – Fallen
- 2009 XRCO Award – Single Performance, Actress – Fallen
- 2009 NightMoves Award – Best Female Performer (Editor's Choice)
- 2009 NightMoves Hall of Fame
- 2010 NightMoves Triple Play Award (Dancing/Performing/Directing)
- 2010 AVN Award – Best Group Sex Scene – 2040
- 2010 AVN Hall of Fame
- 2011 XRCO Hall of Fame
- 2013 XCritic Award – Best Couples Series – A Love Story
- 2013 AVN – Game Changer
- 2013 Sex Award – Porn's Perfect Girl/Girl Screen Couple (with Asa Akira)
- 2014 AVN Award – Best Safe Sex Scene – Sexpionage: The Drake Chronicles
- 2015 XBIZ Award – Best Actress - Parody Release – Snow White XXX: An Axel Braun Parody
- 2015 Doppio Senso Night Award – Best International Actress – Snow White XXX: An Axel Braun Parody
- 2015 Feminist Porn Award – Smutty School Teacher Award for Sex Education – Jessica Drake's Guide to Wicked Sex: Plus Size
- 2015 NightMoves Award – Best BBW Release (Fan's Choice) – Jessica Drake's Guide to Wicked Sex: Plus Size
- 2016 AVN Award – Mainstream Star of the Year
- 2016 XRCO Award – Mainstream Adult Media Favorite
- 2017 XBIZ Award – Sexpert of the Year
- 2018 XBIZ Award – Best Sex Scene, Feature Release – An Inconvenient Mistress
- 2026 Trans Erotica Award – Best Industry Professional
