= WantedList =

WantedList was an adult DVD-by-mail service established in 1999, offering flat-rate subscription-based rentals by mail to customers in the United States. It was based in Van Nuys, California with an additional distribution center in New Jersey.

WantedList had approximately 25,000 subscribers and 20,000 adult DVD titles in stock. It was founded by Anh Tran and Danny Ting, two Asian Americans who were formerly consultants for Arthur Andersen. The technology for the entire operation was designed and implemented by African American / Canadian First Nation software architect Matthew Lopes.

WantedList attracted the attention of several men's magazines between 2003 and 2006, resulting in a number of adult industry novelty publications. One such innovation, the "Pornotron" suggestion engine, drew legal attacks from Hasbro toys, who claimed the product "damaged the good name" of the Transformer's Decepticon line, from which the original artwork was inspired.

== Acquisitions ==
WantedList acquired competitor websites FlickSmart and RentFlixxx in Q4 of 2004. Shortly thereafter they acquired additional competitor websites Video Takeout and Flick Central, both holdings of VTO Enterprises Inc. founded by Dennis Consorte. This last acquisition gave the company their East Coast distribution point in New Jersey to support the West Coast center in California.

== Competition ==
WantedList is one of a number of websites in the pornographic video marketplace that mimic the Netflix model of subscription-based rentals by mail. Other sites include: DVD Empire, XRentDVD, Intimatedvd, AdultDVDCentral.com, Rentdvdxxx.com, URentDVDs, and SugarDVD

== Awards ==
WantedList won the AVN Award for Best Retail Website in 2005, 2006 (tied with Adult DVD Empire) and 2007 and the Xbiz award for Web Retailer of the Year in 2007.

WantedList is a winner of the 2010 Best Adult DVD Rental award for best online porn DVD movie rental service.
