= Randy Spears =

American pornographic actor (born 1961)

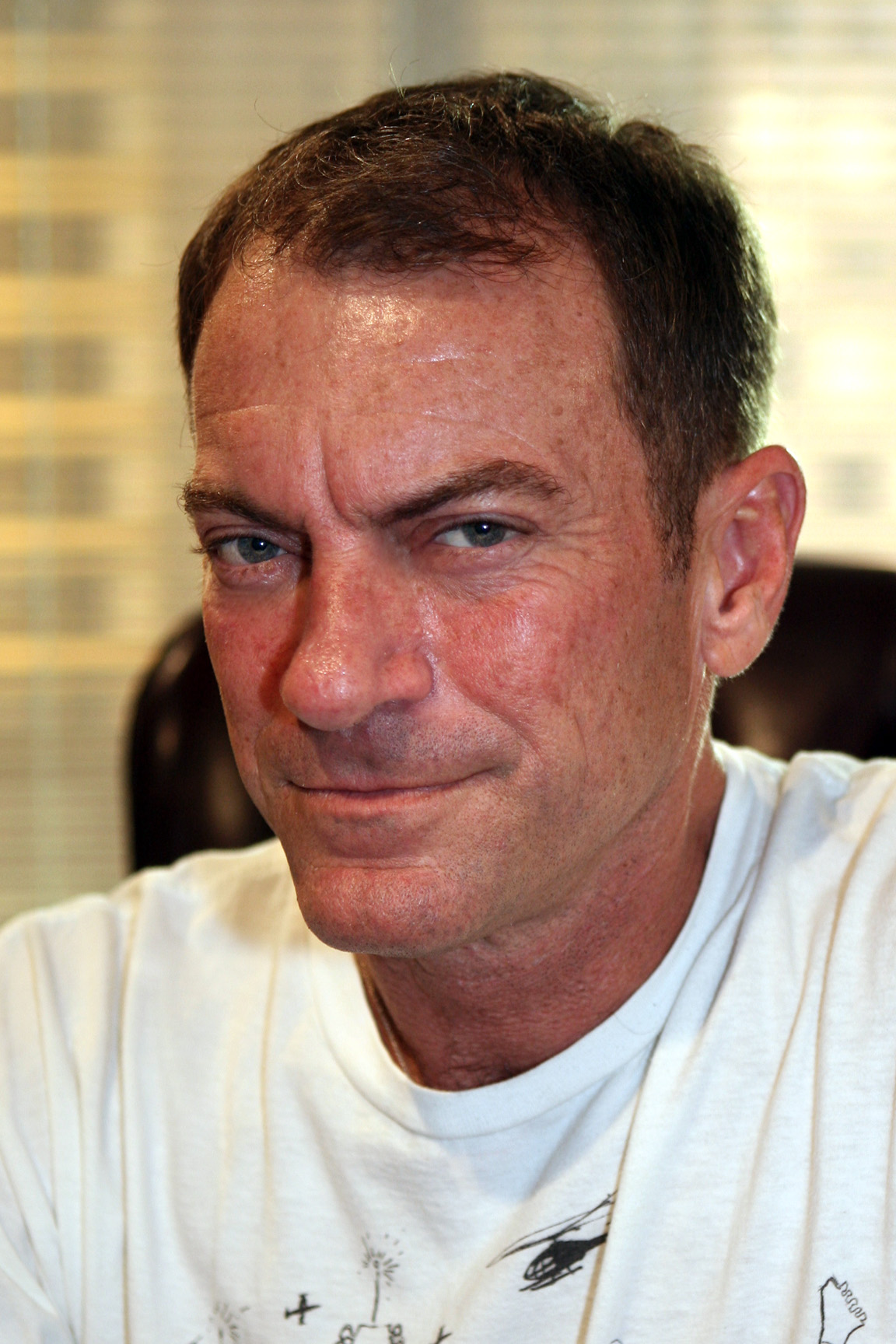
- Spears in September 2010
- Born: June 18, 1961 (age 65); Kankakee, Illinois, U.S.
- Other names: Greg Ory, Nick Russell, Randy Sprars, Gregory Patrick, Greg Patrick, Wayne Green
- Height: 5 ft 11 in (1.80 m)

Randy Spears (born June 18, 1961), sometimes credited as Greg Ory, is an American retired pornographic actor and director who has appeared in numerous adult feature films. Spears is noted among porn actors for his comedic acting talent.

== Career ==
=== Mainstream ===
Spears left Illinois for California during the early 1980s, to pursue a career in acting. He landed small roles in the mainstream films Trading Places and Blow Out. Spears was seen in three mainstream films under the name Gregory Patrick. In the 1988 comedy Sexpot he played the role of Damon; the same year he appeared in the horror comedy Critters 2: The Main Course.

A year later, Spears starred, along with Georgina Spelvin and Linda Blair, in Bad Blood, a gothic thriller also known as A Woman Obsessed. He also acted in commercials and in a one-week stint on Ryan's Hope in 1989, where he played a bartender. In 2009, Spears provided the voice of a character called John Q. Mind in the episode "In Country...Club", the fifth-season premiere of American Dad!

In 2020, he announced that he was returning to the entertainment industry, though mostly doing voiceovers (such as his work in American Dad).

=== Adult films ===
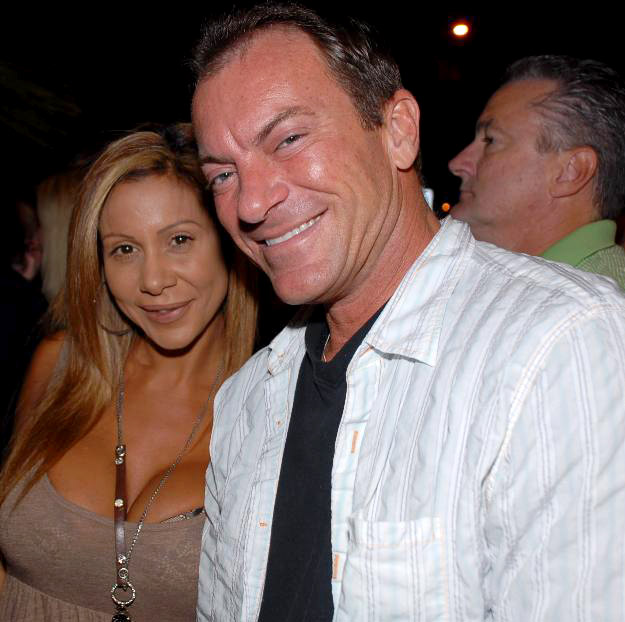
Spears with Gina Rodriguez in 2006

Prior to making adult films, Spears worked as a Chippendales dancer. Spears was introduced to the industry in 1987 by Ona Zee. In a 2016 interview, he said he was an aspiring actor who, after a few years in show business, fell on hard times due to the 1988 Writers Guild of America strike. He said he turned to modeling when a make-up artist handed him her card and told him to dial the number if he ever felt like doing nude work. With nothing more than a can of beans and a sack of potatoes in his cupboard, he called a month later, despite his concern that working in the adult entertainment industry could hurt his professional career later on. Spears said he felt conflicted after his first shoot, for which he earned $400. Still, he fielded and accepted more offers, which came in, he said, once producers noticed he had some acting experience. Initially, he kept his mother uninformed about his new profession.

Spears' first billing was as detective Hank Smith in The Case of the Sensuous Sinners, released in 1988. In 1990, Spears and Tom Byron traveled to Australia and made the films Singles Holiday, Lost in Paradise, Dial a Sailor, Sexual Healer and Outback Assignment. The same year, he won the Adult Video News Best Actor Award for his performance in The Masseuse with Hyapatia Lee. Spears also played Captain Jim Quirk in the "Sex Trek" series, which was a sex-parody of Star Trek. In the early 1990s, Spears left the adult industry for a time before later returning for financial reasons. He has since been inducted into the AVN Hall of Fame.

In 2011, he shot his last film in the pornography film industry, having broken down in tears as he left the set. He publicly announced in 2015 that he had left the industry, turning to Christianity.

In 2018, he announced on his Instagram page that he is in the process of authoring a memoir about his time in the business.

== Personal life ==
He was best friends with Jon Dough, with whom he entered the business at around the same time. Spears expressed that Dough was "like a brother" to him. Following Dough's suicide in 2006, Spears and Dough's widow set up a memorial fund on MySpace to help pay for the funeral costs.

In a 2015 interview, Spears said that he had severe drug problems during his time in the adult business and that a vicious circle kept him in the business all those years: "I had to go to work, to do the porn, so that I could buy the drugs, to bury the pain of doing the porn. So I’d go to work, and do the porn, so I could buy the drugs, to bury the pain. And around and around it went." Spears also claimed that the business changed his view of women, perceiving them as sexual objects, adding "I lost the ability to have a loving and caring relationship. I thought I was still able. I was fooled."

== Awards ==
AVN Awards:

- 1991 Best Actor, Film (The Masseuse)
- 1994 Best Supporting Actor, Video (Haunted Nights)
- 2000 Best Actor, Video (Double Feature!)
- 2002 Hall of Fame inductee
- 2003 Best Supporting Actor, Video (Hercules)
- 2004 Best Actor, Film (Heart of Darkness)
- 2004 Best Supporting Actor, Video (Space Nuts)
- 2004 Best Oral Sex Scene, Film (Heart of Darkness) with Sunrise Adams
- 2006 Best Supporting Actor, Film (Eternity)
- 2006 Best Group Sex Scene, Film (Dark Side)
- 2007 Best Group Sex Scene, Film (Fuck)
- 2007 Best Actor, Film (Manhunters)
- 2008 Best Supporting Actor, Film (Flasher)
- 2010 Best Group Sex Scene (2040) with Special Guest Jamie Wright & Jessica Stone

XRCO Awards:

- 1989 Stud Of The Year
- 1990 Male Performer Of The Year
- 1991 Best Actor (Single Performance) All That Sex
- 1991 Male Performer Of The Year
- 1999 Best Actor (Single Performance) Double Feature
- 2002 Hall of Fame inductee
- 2003 Best Actor (Single Performance) Space Nuts
- 2004 Best Actor (Single Performance) Misty Beethoven - The Musical
- 2005 Best Actor (Single Performance) Eternity
- 2006 Best Actor (Single Performance) Curse Eternal
- 2007 Best Actor (Single Performance) Black Widow

Other awards:

- 1993 F.O.X.E Male Fan Favorite
- 1999 Nightmoves Award for Best Actor/Male Performer (Editors Choice)
- 2001 F.O.X.E Male Fan Favorite
- 2002 Nightmoves Award for Best Actor/Male Performer (Editors Choice)
- 2005 Nightmoves Award for Best Actor/Male Performer (Fans Choice)
- 2006 F.O.X.E Male Fan Favorite
- 2006 Ninfa Award - Best Supporting Actor (La mansión del placer)
- 2007 F.A.M.E. Award – Favorite Male Star
- 2008 Eroticline Award - Best International Actor

== Selected videography ==
- What about Boob? (1994)
- Sex Trek: The Next Penetration (1995)
- The Plumber's Revenge 2 (1996)
- Hung Wankenstein (2001)
- XXX Training (2001)
- Jane Millionaire (2002)
- Snatch Adams (2002)
- Rawhide (2003)
- Babes Behind Bars (2005)
- Ethnic City (2005)
- Full Exposure (2005)
- Pandora's Box (2005)
- Prisoner (2005)
- Two (2008)
- Naughty Bookworms (2009)
- Batman XXX: A Porn Parody (2010)
- The Alibi (2010)
- Heat (2013)
