= List of British pornographic film actors =

A list of notable British pornographic film actors:

== Female ==
Picture	Name	Aliases	Place of birth	Years active	Awards
	Yasmeena Ali	Yasmeena Ali, Yasmeena Model	Kabul, Afghanistan	2017–2019	
	Sophie Anderson	The Cock Destroyer (with Rebecca More)	Bristol	2017–2023	
	Cathy Barry	Cathy Berry, Cindy Q	Bristol	2001–2011	* 2007 Lifetime Achievement Award from the UK Adult Film and Television Awards
	Samantha Bentley	Lady Samantha Bantley, Samantha B, Pixie May	South London	2011–2021	* 2013 AVN Award for Best All-Girl Group Sex Scene * 2015 AVN Award for Best Sex Scene in a Foreign-Shot Production
	Tia Billinger	Bonnie Blue	Stapleford, Nottinghamshire	2023–present	* 2025 Pornhub Award for Favorite Newcomer * 2025 XMA Creator Award for Boy/Girl Collab Clip of the Year (with Luke Cooper)
	Eileen Daly	Eileen Bailey, Aileen Bailey, Grace, Hazel	Dulwich, London	1979–2005	
	Sophie Dee		Carmarthen	2005–2014; 2019–2020	* 31 from 2010 to 2020 * 2017 Adult Feature Entertainer of the Year at the Exotic Dancer Awards * 2018 AVN Award for Best Anal Sex Scene
	Belle Delphine	Mary-Belle Kirschner	Cape Town, South Africa	2020–present	
	Linzi Drew		Bristol	1981–1998	
	Roxanne Hall	Angela, Angela Hall, Angie, Cindy Stevens, Roxana Grand, Roxana Hall, Roxane Hall, Roxanne, Roxie, Roxxanne Hall	Romford	1994–2017	
	Hannah Harper	Hannah Hunter	Brixham	2001–2015	
	Ella Hughes		Southampton	2015–present	* 2019 Spank Bank Awards Winner: Porn's 'It' Girl * 2019 Spank Bank Technical Awards Winner: Rightful Heir of the Iron Throne * 2019 XBiz Awards Winner: Foreign Female Performer of the Year * 2019 XBIZ Europa Awards Winner: International Crossover Star * 2020 AVN Awards Winner: Best Foreign-Shot Group Sex Scene, Blacked Raw V15 (2019) * 2020 Spank Bank Technical Awards Winner: Fabulous Firecrotch * 2020 Spank Bank Awards Winner: Best Piercing
	Joanna Jet	Joan Jett, Joana Jet, Joanna Jett	London	2002–2021	24 nominations (2010–2019); AVN Inducted: Hall of Fame (Video Branch), 2015
	Roxy Jezel	Roxy, Roxy Heart, Roxy Jewel	London	2003–2022	* 2005 AVN's 10 Terrific Oral Sex Scenes, Share the Load 2 (2004) * 2008 Urban Spice Awards, Nominee: Best Female Performer
	Sahara Knite	Ayesha, Sahara Knight, Smara Knite, Sahara, Saeeda	Lancashire	2004–2022	
	McKenzie Lee		Leicester	2004–2006 and 2009–present	* 2006 AVN Award for Best New Starlet * XBiz Awards 2022 Winner: Best Sex Scene - Trans, TS Love Stories 6 (2021)
	Ashley Long	Amy Ball, Ashley Morgan, Ashley Britt	London	2001–2009	* 2004 AVN Award for Best Couples Sex Scene (Film)and Best Group Sex Scene (Video) * 2004 XRCO Award for Best Single Performance (Actress) * 2004 Adam Film World Guide Award for Best Actress (Film) and Best Sex Scene (Film)
	Magdalene St. Michaels	Magdalene	Born in Malta, raised in England	2007–2020	12 nominations total 7 AVN Awards nominations 1 Sex Awards nomination 4 Transgender Erotica Awards Show nominations
	Georgie Lyall		Glasgow	2013–2021	* 2020 Nominee: Best Sex Scene (XBIZ Europa Awards)
	Linsey Dawn McKenzie		London	2000–2004 and 2009–2016	
	Mary Millington	Nancy Astley, Miss Bohrloch, Susan David, Marion Ellis, Janet Green, Samantha Jones, Mary Maxted, Rebecca Stephens, Sally Stephens, Sally Stevens, June Taylor, Rebecca Wilkinson, Karen Young	Kenton	1970s	
	Rebecca More		Portsmouth	2011–present	
	Poppy Morgan	Poppy	Hull, Yorkshire	2004–2017	* 2006 UK Adult Film and Television Awards – Best Female Actress of the Year * 2008 AVN Award for Best Sex Scene in a Foreign-Shot Production
	Tuppy Owens		Cambridge	1975	
	Kay Parker	Jill Jackson, Kay Taylor Parker,	Birmingham	1977–1998	* 1983 Adult Film Association of America Award for Best Supporting Actress * 1985 XRCO Special Merit Award * AVN Hall of Fame * 1990 XRCO Hall of Fame * 2017 – Top 12 Spirited Woman Book Pick List
	Carly Rae	Amanda Lorian, Carly Rae Summers, Katerin	Manchester	2012–2022	XBiz Awards 2019 Nominee: Best Sex Scene - Comedy Release, Hand Solo: A DP XXX Parody (2018); XBIZ Europa Awards 2019 Nominee: Best Sex Scene - Feature Movie, Hand Solo: A DP XXX Parody (2018)
	Gal Ritchie			2023–present	2025 XRCO Award: Best New Starlet
	Alicia Rhodes	Alicia Rhoades, Angela, Alisha, Alicia Pays	Manchester	2002–2013	* 2004 Winner: Best Actress (BGAFD Awards) * 2006 Winner: Best Female Performer in an Anal Scene (UK Adult Film and Television Awards)
	Flick Shagwell	Queen, Mrs. F. Morse, Felicity Shagswell, Flick Shagswell, Flick Shaywell, Rebecca Lee, Becky Lee, Becky Lester, Leeanne, Tiffany, Ralee	Cambridge	2000–2012	AVN Awards: Nominee: Best Group Sex Scene: Video, World Class Ass 1 (2001); Nominee: Best Oral Sex Scene: Video, Lady Fellatio in the Doghouse (2002)
	Nici Sterling	Nici Norman, Nicky Teen	Epsom	1994–2006	* 2007 AVN Hall of Fame
	Tanya Tate		Liverpool	2009–2020	* 2010, '12, '14, '16–17 NightMoves Award for Best MILF Performer (Editor's Choice) * 2010–13 SHAFTA Award for MILF of the Year * 2010–13 SHAFTA Award for Best Sex Scene, Best Series, Best Reality/Gonzo Series, Best Amateur Series * 2013 XBIZ Award for MILF Performer of the Year * 2014 Fanny Award for MILF Performer of the Year * 2016 XRCO Award for Best Lesbian Performer * 2017 NightMoves Triple Play Award * 2023 XRCO Award Hall of Fame
	Michelle Thorne	Tasha, Michelle Thorpe	Bristol	2000–2007	
	Eve Vorley			2002 (1998–2002 as a pornographic director)	
	Taylor Wane	Zoey Miles, Joanna G, Farran Heights	Gateshead	1989–2018	* 1992 AVN Award for Best Couples Sex Scene (Film) * 2005 AVN Hall of Fame * 2014 XRCO Hall of Fame

== Male ==
Picture	Name	Aliases	Place of birth	Years active	Awards
	Kristen Bjorn		London	1978–	2007 Barcelona International Erotic Film Festival Heatgay Award
	John T. Bone		Manchester	1987–2001 (1985–2006 as a pornographic director)	2001 Inducted: Hall of Fame
	Nicky Crane		Bexley	1986–1992	
	Mark Davis	Steven Scott	Essex	1993–2012; 2016–	AVN Hall of Fame; XRCO Hall of Fame; 1994 XRCO Best Anal Sex Scene; 1996 AVN Best Group Sex Scene (Video); 1998 AVN Best Anal Sex Scene (Video); 2001 XRCO Best Male-Female Sex Scene; 2009 AVN Award for Best Group Sex Scene
	Ben Dover	Steve Perry	Sittingbourne	1992–2005	1997 AVN Breakthrough Award
	Ben English	B English, Ben, Derek Hay	England	2002–2014	2003 XRCO Award for New Stud; 2004 AVN Award for Best Male Newcomer; 2009 AVN Award for Best Supporting Actor; 2014 Inducted: AVN Awards Hall of Fame (Founders Branch)
	Keiran Lee	Adam Diksa	Derby	2006–	2007 UKAFTA for Best Male Actor; 2017 AVN Fan Award for "Favourite Male Porn Star"
	Dave London	David Cregeen	Preston	2015–2023	
	Marcus London		London	1995–	2007 AVN Award for Best Oral Sex Scene (Film)
	Wilde Oscar	Chris Sterling, Chris Oscar, Adam Knight	Burnham, Buckinghamshire	1995–2002	1998 AVN Award for Best Supporting Actor (Film); 2001 AVN Award for Best Supporting Actor (Video)
	Aiden Shaw	Aiden Brady	England	1992–2004	
	Keni Styles	Keni Stiles, Kenny, Keni Style, Keni Tent	Lamphun, Thailand	2005–2019	* 2006 UK Adult Film and Television Awards for Best Male Newcomer * 2007 UK Adult Film and Television Awards for Best Supporting Male Actor
	Paul Baxendale-Walker				
	Danny D	Danny Dong, Matt Hughes	Maidstone, Kent	2006–	2024 AVN Award for Best Supporting Actor for Space Junk; 2024 AVN Award - Hall of Fame - Video Branch; 2023 AVN Award for International Male Performer of the Year; 2023 XBIZ Europa Award for Best Sex Scene - Feature for Pornstars In Space; 2022 XBIZ Europa Award for Best Acting for Deeper Space; 2020 XBIZ Award for Foreign Male Performer of the Year; 2019 XBIZ Europa Award for Best Actor for Dangerous Women; 2018 AVN Award for Best Actor for Nevermore; XBIZ Europa Award for Best Sex Scene - Feature Movie for Hand Solo: A DP XXX Parody; 2018 Pornhub Award for Best Cumshot (Fan Award); 2017 AVN Award for Best Actor for The Doctor; 2016 XBIZ Award for Foreign Male Performer of The Year; 2014 XBIZ Award for Foreign Male Performer of The Year

== See also ==
- Outline of British pornography
- Pornography in the United Kingdom
- List of male actors in gay pornographic films
