= Blood Lake =

- DVD cover
- Directed by: C.L. Gregory
- Written by: Erin Gilmer
- Produced by: David Lash; C.L. Gregory
- Starring: Dan Holmes; Dick Chibbles; Johnny Depth; Tyler Houston; India Summer; C.J. Summers; Bobby Banger; Sandy Simmers
- Cinematography: Bryan McPherson
- Edited by: Roderick D. Escue
- Music by: Kevin MacLeod
- Production company: Midnite Films
- Distributed by: VCA Pictures
- Release date: April 25, 2006
- Running time: 85 minutes
- Country: United States
- Language: English

Blood Lake is a 2006 American pornographic horror film directed by C.L. Gregory, and written by Erin Gilmer. A sequel, with the tentative title of The Foundation: Blood Lake 2, was announced in 2005.

== Plot ==
A septet of friends (Andy, Roger, Tricia, Max, Nell, Charlotte and Nicole) travel to a cluster of lakeside cabins, where they unearth a "blood book" that tells the story of Preacher Jacob, a priest who took over the nearby town's congregation in 1896. Jacob had his followers commit mass suicide under the belief that he could resurrect them as a new, perfect race enlightened by their deaths. Max and Nell go off to have sex, but before they do so Max skims the blood book and reads an incantation aloud, summoning the homicidal spirit of Preacher Jacob.

The first of the group to be killed is Roger, who Preacher Jacob axes in the back. The preacher then captures Nicole, ties her to a tree, and hacks her to death with the axe. Next, Sam is garroted with a rope, while Nell has her throat slit in the shower. Tricia realizes what is going on, and tries to get help from Andy and Charlotte, but the two are kept sealed in their cabin by a supernatural force, which relents after Tricia flees at the sight of Preacher Jacob. Andy and Charlotte decide to barricade themselves in the cabin until sunrise, and pass the time by having sex.

Later, Charlotte goes to wake Andy up, but finds Preacher Jacob in his bed. The undead holy man kills her, then goes after the wounded Andy (who has the blood book) and Tricia. Jacob chases Andy and Tricia to a dock, strangles Andy, and is seemingly destroyed when Tricia sets the blood book on fire. Tricia gets in one of the cars and drives away, but as she leaves the campgrounds, Preacher Jacob appears in the vehicle, and attacks her.

== Cast ==
- C.J. Summers as Charlotte
- Tyler Houston as Tricia
- Sandy Simmers as Nicole
- India Summer as Nell
- Johnny Depth as Roger
- Dick Chibbles as Max
- Bobby Banger as Andy
- Dan Holmes as Preacher Jacob

== Reception ==
Max Schwartz of AVN gave Blood Lake a 3/5, calling the sex scenes passable, and noting that the film suffered from an incoherent script, sloppy editing, painful acting, and dull dialogue. X Critic, which awarded a 0.5 out of 5, labeled Blood Lake "one of the worst hardcore releases in recent years" and opined that it felt "half completed, over edited and devoid of anything that makes terror and twat the least bit interesting". The same score was given to the film by Adult DVD Talk, which condemned Blood Lake as a "tedious viewing experience" in which "the photography is terrible, the editing is laughably inept, and the acting is as non existent as the gore".

[re]Search my Trash's Mike Haberfelner similarly condemned Blood Lake, writing, "Basically, this is hardcore porn and slasher movie rolled into one - and at least on paper that seems a good idea as slasher movies often use sexual allusions anyways, so why not just make the sex explicit? Unfortunately, Blood Lake doesn't quite function that way, as the sex scenes don't seem to be properly integrated into the plot, are pretty much just self-serving, too run-of-the-mill and invariably break up the narrative tension rather than contribute to it (that said, the girls are hot at least). Plus, on a narrative level, the film is full of non-sequiturs, and one fails to actually feel for the characters as they all lack depth or at least distinction. Now personally I'm all for narrative porn, but with this one one just wishes someone had tried to piece together an actual story than just throw genre mainstays at bland characters".
