= 10th AVN Awards =

US adult industry award ceremony in 1993

- The 10th Annual AVN Awards Show VHS box cover
- Date: January 1993
- Site: Bally's Hotel and Casino, Paradise, Nevada
- Hosted by: Randy West; Porsche Lynn; Ona Zee
- Produced by: Gary Miller
- Directed by: S. Marco DiMercurio

Highlights
- Best Picture: Face Dance, Parts 1 & 2 (Best Film)
- Most awards: The Party (8)

The 10th AVN Awards ceremony, presented by Adult Video News (AVN), honored pornographic films released in 1992 in the United States and took place in January 1993, at Bally's Hotel and Casino in Paradise, Nevada. During the ceremony, AVN presented AVN Awards in 67 categories. The ceremony was produced by Gary Miller and directed by S. Marco DiMercurio. Actor Randy West hosted the show for the second consecutive year, with actresses Porsche Lynn and Ona Zee as co-hosts.

The Party won eight AVN awards but Best Film went to Face Dance, Parts 1 & 2, which also won Best Director—Film for John Stagliano.

== Winners and nominees ==
The winners were announced during the awards ceremony in January 1993. Ashlyn Gere won the grand slam of erotic acting: Female Performer of the Year, Best Actress in a Feature Film and Best Actress in a Video.

=== Major awards ===
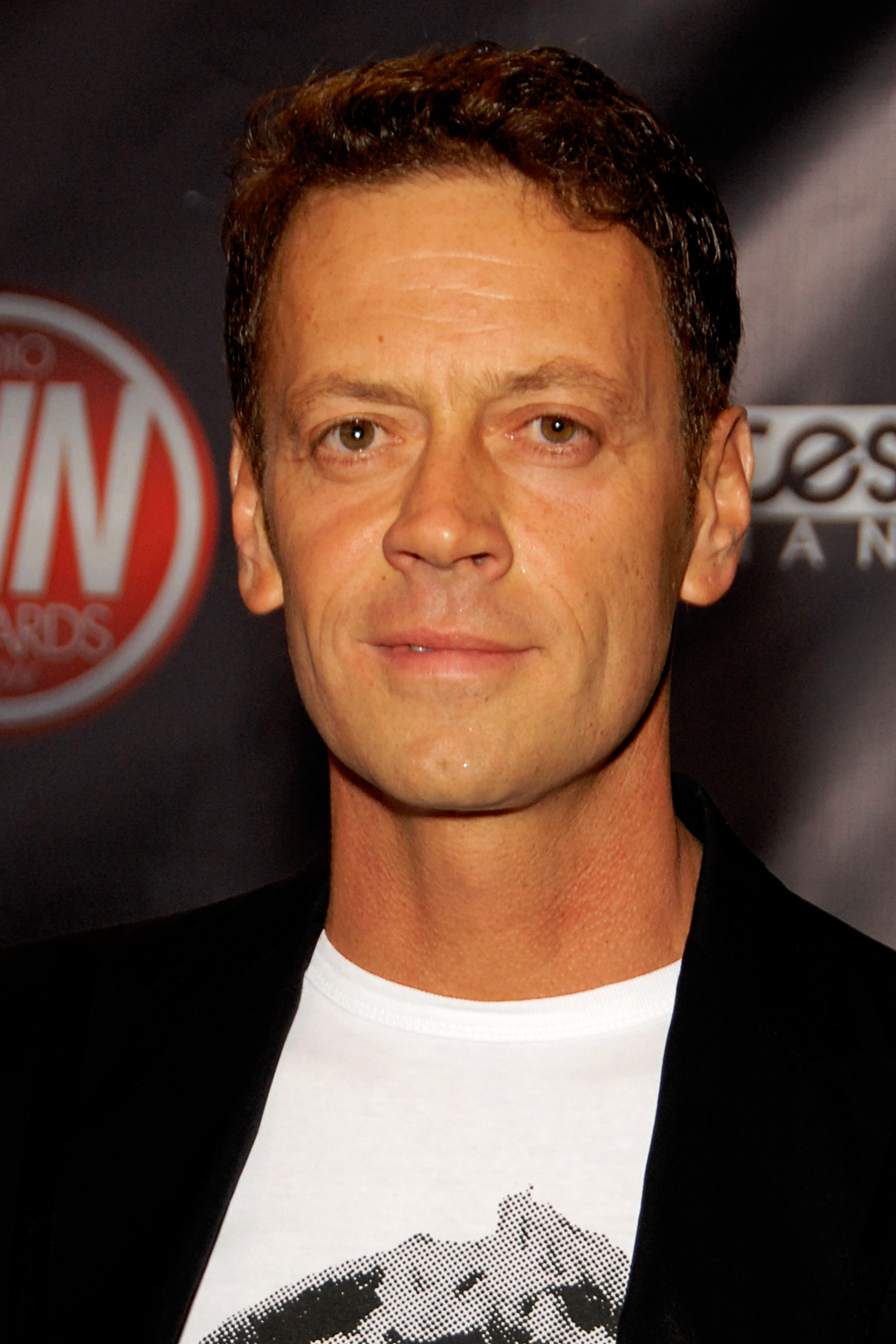
Rocco Siffredi, Male Performer of the Year winner

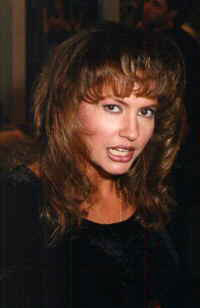
Ashlyn Gere, Female Performer of the Year, Best Actress—Film and Best Actress—Video winner

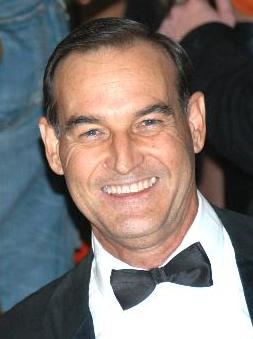
Mike Horner, Best Actor—Film winner

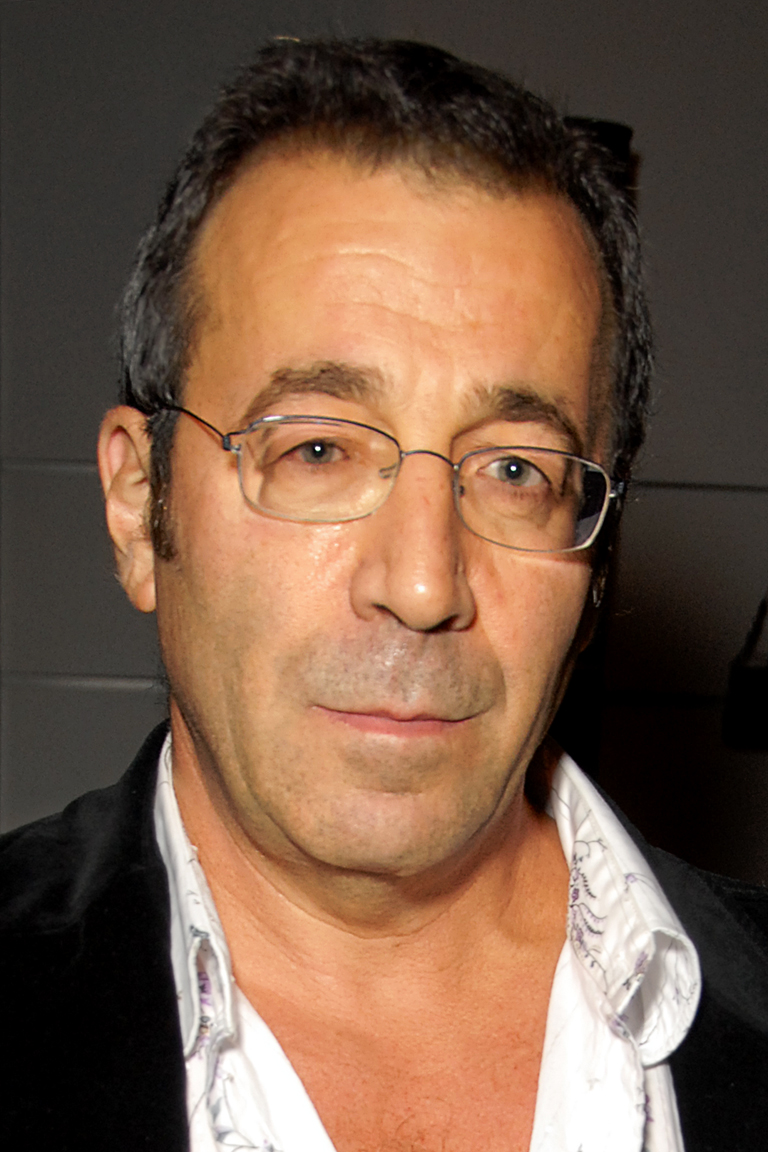
John Stagliano, Best Director—Film winner

Winners are listed first, highlighted in boldface, and indicated with a double dagger (‡).

Best Film	Best Shot-on-Video Feature
**Face Dance, Parts 1 & 2**‡; Bonnie and Clyde; The Secret Garden 1 & 2	**The Party**‡
Male Performer of the Year	Female Performer of the Year
**Rocco Siffredi**‡; Mike Horner	**Ashlyn Gere**‡
Best New Starlet	Best Tease Performance
**Alex Jordan**‡; Chrissy Ann; Nikki Dial; Kiss; Tiffany Million; Tiffany Mynx; Kelly O’Dell; Alicia Rio	**Racquel Darrian, Bonnie and Clyde**‡
Best Actor—Film	Best Actress—Film
**Mike Horner, The Seduction of Mary**‡; Rocco Siffredi, Face Dance, Parts 1 & 2	**Ashlyn Gere, Chameleons**‡; Tiffany Million, Face Dance, Parts 1 & 2; Ashlyn Gere, The Secret Garden 1 & 2
Best Actor—Video	Best Actress—Video
**Joey Silvera, The Party**‡; Tony Tedeschi, The Buttsizer	**Ashlyn Gere, Two Women**‡; Tiffany Million, One in a Million; Victoria Paris, Two Women; Ashlyn Gere, Gerein’ Up; Taylor Wane, Just Friends
Best Supporting Actor—Film	Best Supporting Actress—Film
**Randy Spears, The Secret Garden 1 & 2**‡^{1}; Joey Silvera, Face Dance, Parts 1 & 2	**Ona Zee, The Secret Garden 1 & 2**‡
Best Supporting Actor—Video	Best Supporting Actress—Video
**Tony Tedeschi, Smeers**‡	**Melanie Moore, The Party**‡
Best Sex Scene, Film	Best Sex Scene, Video (Couple)
**Angel Ash, Chrissy Ann, Sheila Stone, Sierra, Tiffany Mynx, Rick Smears, Rocco Siffredi, Tom Byron, Woody Long; the blindfold butt orgy, Face Dance, Part 1**‡; Rocco Siffredi, Sierra; Face Dance, Part 2	**Joey Silvera, Alex Jordan; The Party**‡; Rocco Siffredi, Silver; Butt Freak
Best Sex Scene, Video (Group)	Best All-Girl Sex Scene, Video
**Marc Wallice, T. T. Boy, Ashlyn Gere; Realities 2**‡; Danyel Cheeks, Jim Sparks, Joey Silvera, John Stagliano, Woody Long; the anal gang bang, Butt Freak	**Diedre Holland, Ashlyn Gere; strap-on dildo scene, Chameleons**‡; Summer Knight, Porsche Lynn; Where The Girls Play; Madison, Flame; Buttwoman II: Behind Bars; Pool table orgy, Kittens III
Best Gonzo Video	Best Amateur or Pro-Am Video Series
**Radical Affairs I**‡	**More Dirty Debutantes**‡

=== Additional award winners ===
These awards were also announced at the awards show.

- Best All-Girl Video: Kittens III
- Best All-Sex Video: Realities 2
- Best Alternative Release, Film: Desert Passion
- Best Alternative Release, Specialty or Featurette Tape: Playmates In Paradise
- Best Alternative Release, Video: Love Scenes, Vol. 2
- Best Amateur Tape: Amorous Amateurs #12
- Best Anal-Themed Video: Dr. Butts 2
- Best Art Direction: Bonnie and Clyde
- Best Big-Bust Specialty Tape: Adventures of Breastman
- Best Bisexual Video: Down Bi Law
- Best Bondage Specialty Tape: Ona Zee's Learning The Ropes 1–3
- Best Boxcover Concept: Bonnie and Clyde
- Best Boxcover Concept, Gay Video: Mindscape II
- Best Cinematography: Face Dance, Parts 1 & 2
- Best Compilation Tape: Only The Very Best On Film
- Best Director, Bisexual Video: Josh Eliot, Down Bi Law
- Best Director, Feature Film: John Stagliano, Face Dance, Parts 1 & 2
- Best Director, Gay Video: Chi Chi LaRue, Songs in the Key of Sex
- **Best Director, Video Feature** (tie): Alex de Renzy, Two Women; Anthony Spinelli, The Party
- Best Editing for a Film: Chameleons
- Best Editing for a Gay Video Feature: James Stark, Kiss-Off
- Best Gay Video Feature: Kiss-Off
- Best Gay Video Solo Release: The Beat Cop
- Best Music: Chameleons
- Best Music, Gay Video: Straight To The Zone
- Best Newcomer, Gay Video: B. J. Slater
- Best Non-Sexual Performance: J. B., The Dirty Little Mind of Martin Fink
- Best Non-Sexual Performance, Gay Video: Kenneth Weyerhaeuser, Kiss-Off
- Best Overall Marketing Campaign: The Party, Pepper Productions
- Best Packaging, Feature Film: Sin City—The Movie
- Best Packaging, Gay Video: Mindscape II
- Best Packaging, Specialty Tape: The Legend of Katoey Island
- Best Packaging, Video Feature: Illusions
- Best Performance in a Gay Video: Michael Brawn, Kiss-Off
- Best Pro-Am Tape: Biff Malibu's Totally Nasty Home Videos #6
- Best Screenplay, Film: Michael Torino, The Secret Garden 1 & 2
- Best Screenplay, Gay Video: Stan Mitchell, Songs in the Key of Sex
- Best Screenplay, Video: Michael Ellis, Jack Stephan; The Party
- Best Sex Scene in a Gay Video: Erik Houston, Brett Ford, Scorcher
- Best Spanking Specialty Tape: Defiance: The Spanking Saga
- Best Specialty Tape — All Other Genres: The Legend of Katoey Island
- Best Supporting Performance in a Gay Video: Wes Daniels, Songs in the Key of Sex
- Best Video Editing: Gene Sixx, The Party
- Best Videography: Two Women
- Best Videography, Gay Video: Ellary Stag, Disconnected
- Top Renting Release of the Year: Chameleons
- Top Selling Release of the Year: Chameleons

=== Honorary AVN awards ===
==== Special Achievement Award ====
- Paul Thomas and Vivid Video, for loyalty to the adult film genre

==== Hall of Fame ====
AVN Hall of Fame inductees for 1993 were: Erica Boyer, David Christopher, Debi Diamond, Jim Holliday, Fred J. Lincoln, Richard Mailer, William Margold, Peter North, Loni Sanders, Jeff Stryker, Marc Wallice, Ona Zee

=== Multiple nominations and awards ===
The following twelve movies received multiple awards:

- 8 - The Party
- 6 - Chameleons
- 4 - Face Dance, Parts 1 & 2; Kiss-Off
- 3 - Bonnie and Clyde, The Secret Garden 1 & 2, Songs in the Key of Sex, Two Women
- 2 - Down Bi Law, The Legend of Katoey Island, Mindscape II, Realities 2

== Presenters and performers ==
The following individuals, in order of appearance, presented awards or performed musical numbers. The show's trophy girl was Shayla LaVeaux.

=== Presenters ===
Presenters

Name(s)	Role
Alexis DeVille; Madison; Kelly O'Dell	Presenters of the awards for Best Supporting Actor—Video and Best Supporting Actress—Video
Tiffany Million; Jonathan Morgan; Leena	Presenters of the awards for Best Supporting Actor—Film and Best Supporting Actress—Film
Raquel Darrian; Janine Lindemulder	Presenters of the awards for Best All-Girl Sex Scene and Best Group Sex Scene
Sharon Mitchell; Lynn LeMay; Sheila Stone	Presenters of the awards for Best Tease Performance and Best Amateur or Pro-Am Series Video Series
Sean Michaels; Sunny McKay	Presenters of the awards for Best Sex Scene on Film and Best Sex Scene on Video
Hyapatia Lee; Rick Savage	Presenters of the awards for Male Performer of the Year and Female Performer of the Year
Ona Zee; Randy West	Presenters of the award for Best New Starlet
Tony Tedeschi; Domonique Simone; Taylor Wane	Presenters of the awards for Best Actor in a Feature Film and Best Actress in a Feature Film
Tom Byron; Angela Summers	Presenters of the awards for Best Actor in a Shot-on-Video Feature and Best Actress in a Shot-on-Video Feature
Ashlyn Gere; Jon Dough	Presenters of the award for Feature Film of the Year
Ona Zee; Randy West	Presenters of the award for Best Shot-on-Video Feature

=== Performers ===
Performers

Name(s)	Role	Performed
Randy West; The Stingers	Performers	Opening number: “We Put the X in Sex”
Bobby Slayton	Performer	Standup comedy
Chi Chi LaRue; The Stingers	Performers	Musical number: “Two Tons of Love”

== Ceremony information ==
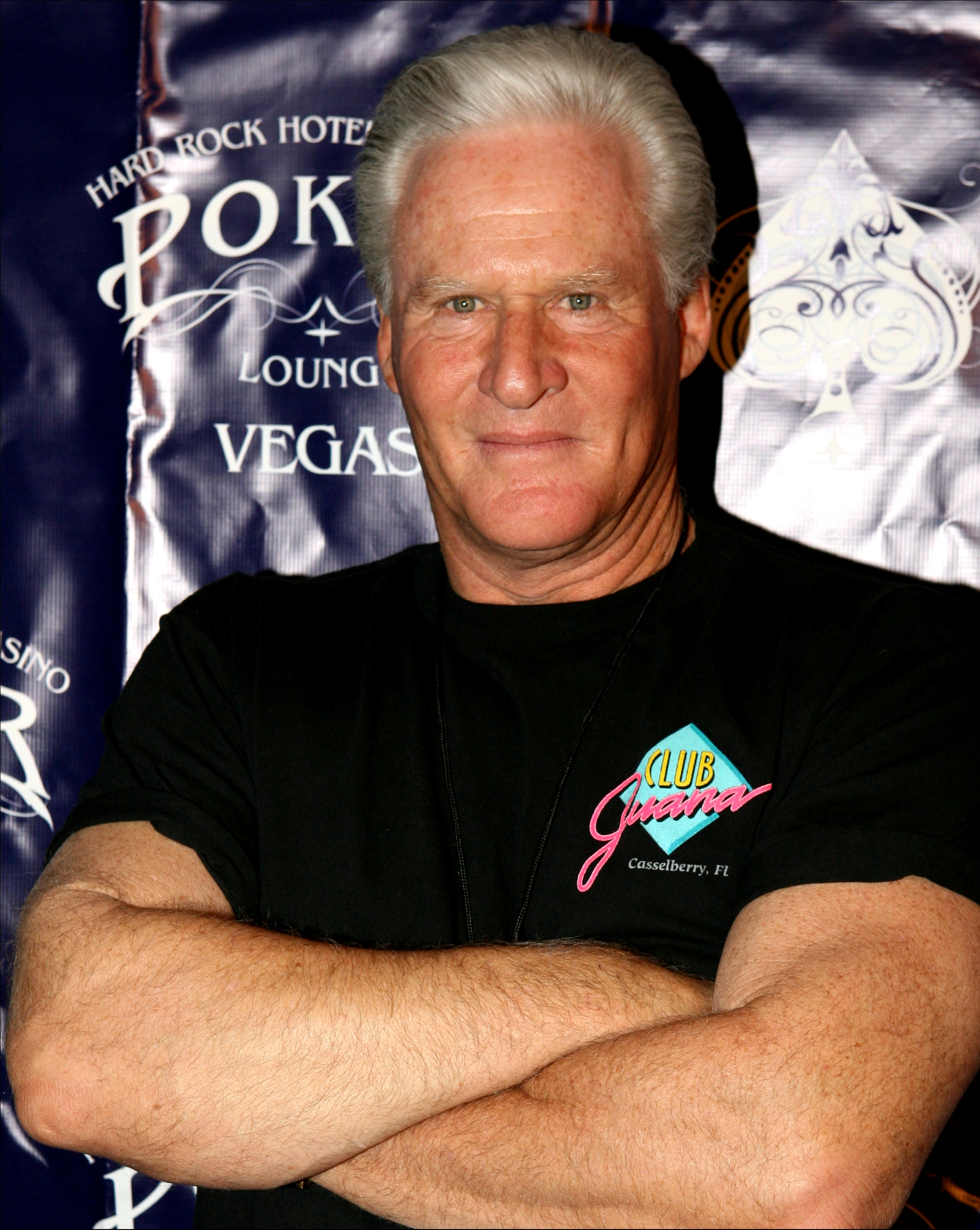
Randy West hosted the 10th AVN Awards

Actor Randy West hosted the show for the second consecutive year. His co-host for the first half of the show was Porsche Lynn while Ona Zee co-hosted the last half. Randy West opened the show with a song, “We Put the X in Sex”, the lyrics of which contained names of several actors and actresses.

Several other people were involved with the production of the ceremony. The live show was produced by Gary Todd while musical direction was undertaken by Mark J. Miller. A VHS videotape of the show was also published and sold by VCA Pictures, which was produced and directed by S. Marco DiMercurio.

There were several new categories this year, including Female Performer of the Year, Male Performer of the Year, Best Gonzo Video and Best Amateur or Pro-Am Video series.

Chameleons was announced as both the top selling movie and the top renting movie of the year.

=== Critical reviews ===
Hustler magazine was critical of the awards, pointing out the Best Marketing Campaign award went to a video that wasn't released in 1992, and adding, “No matter. The AVN show isn't about accuracy. The annual exercise is a tuxedo-clad circle-jerk from AVN to all its advertisers. The joke is watching so many smut peddlers and performers take it seriously.”

Cheri magazine was more charitable, calling the awards “the porn industry's biggest party of the year.”

== See also ==
- AVN Award for Best Actress
- AVN Award for Best Supporting Actress
- AVN Award for Male Foreign Performer of the Year
- AVN Award for Male Performer of the Year
- AVN Award for Female Foreign Performer of the Year
- AVN Female Performer of the Year Award
- List of members of the AVN Hall of Fame

== Notes ==
^1 Randy Spears was announced as the winner of Best Supporting Actor—Film in VCA Pictures' VHS videotape of the awards show, and a clip featuring him in The Secret Garden is shown. Cheri magazine also reported Spears as the winner of this category. However, Adult Video News magazine reported that the category was won by Joey Silvera for his role in Face Dance, Parts 1 & 2. AVN has repeated this in its lists of past winners published online and in subsequent awards show official programs. AVN did not report whether an error was made at the show, so it may be an error in their publications.

== Bibliography ==
- "AVN Awards & CES Event Report". Bachelor (in Japanese). Japan. April 1993.
- "The AVN Awards, the CES Show in Vegas". High Society. United States. July 1993.
- "Hot Vegas: Filtny Times at XXX Vid Awards". Live. United States. December 1993.
