= AVN Award for Best Supporting Actor =

Pornographic film award presented annually by AVN

- AVN award for contributions of supporting actors to pornography
- Awarded for: Best Performance by an Actor in a Supporting Role
- Sponsored by: AVN
- Location: Las Vegas
- Country: USA
- Presented by: AVN Media Network
- First award: 1984; 42 years ago
- Final award: 2025
- Most recent winner: Ken Feels; Once Upon a Time in the Valley (2026)

Highlights
- Most wins: Randy Spears (7 awards)
- Total awarded: 62 (42–for films, 20–for videos)
- First winner: Richard Pacheco; Nothing to Hide (1984)
- Website: avnawards.avn.com

The AVN Award for Best Supporting Actor is an award that has been given annually by sex industry company AVN since the award's inception in 1984.

Till 2008, the award was awarded annually for two different categories–film and video. From year 2009, it is awarded annually for a single category.

First recipient of the award was Richard Pacheco, who was awarded at 1st AVN Awards in 1984 for his performance in Nothing to Hide. As of 2025, Randy Spears is the most honoured pornographic actor with seven awards followed by Xander Corvus with four awards, while four pornographic actors–Steven St. Croix, Tony Tedeschi, Tom Byron and Tommy Pistol with three awards and nine pornographic actors–Richard Pacheco, Ron Jeremy, Jamie Gillis, Mike Horner, Jon Dough, Michael J. Cox, Wilde Oscar, Joey Silvera and Rick Savage–have won the award two times. Jamie Gillis is the oldest recipient of the award at the age of 55 for his performance in Forever Night (1999) and Xander Corvus is the youngest recipient of the award at the age of 23 for his performance in Star Trek:The Next Generation - A XXX Parody (2012). Steven St. Croix is the only pornographic actor to have won in three different decades–the 1990s, 2000s, and 2010s. The most recent recipient is Ken Feels, who was honoured at the 43rd AVN Awards in 2026 for his performance in Once Upon a Time in the Valley.

== Key ==
Symbol	Meaning
†	Indicates that the winner won the award for two performances in that year

== Winners and nominees ==
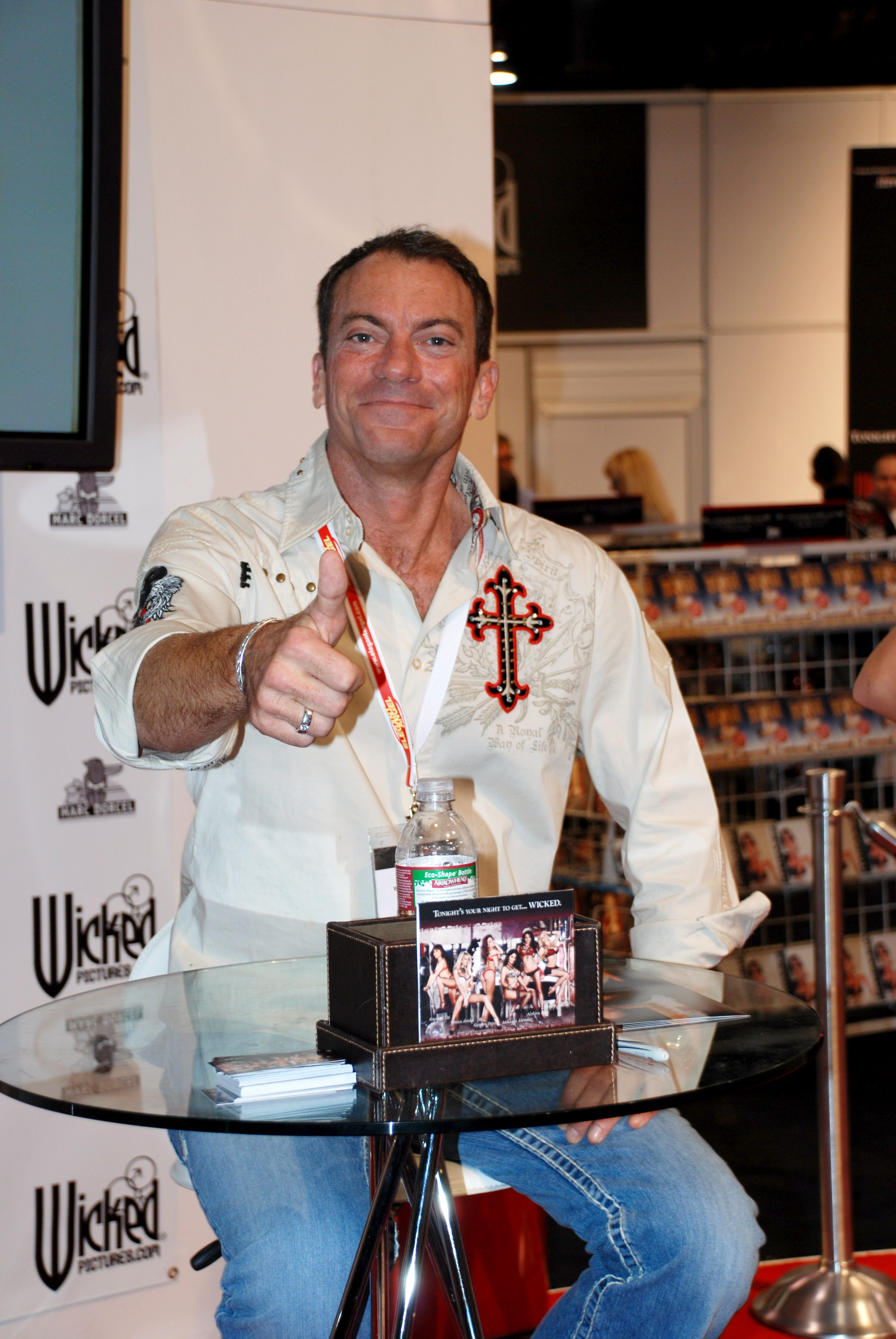
Randy Spears has been the most frequent winner of the award (seven times).

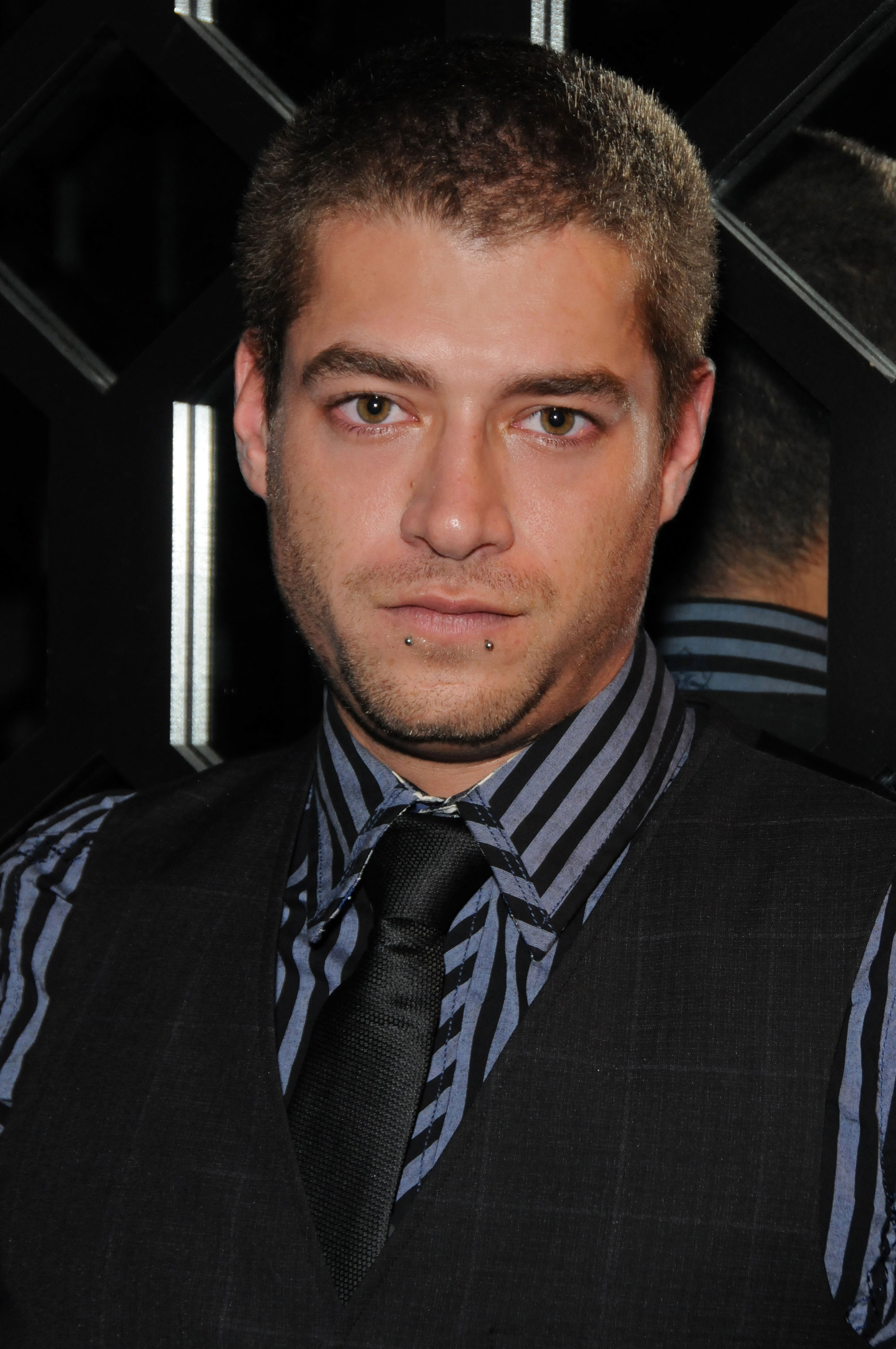
Xander Corvus has been the second most frequent winner of the award (four times).

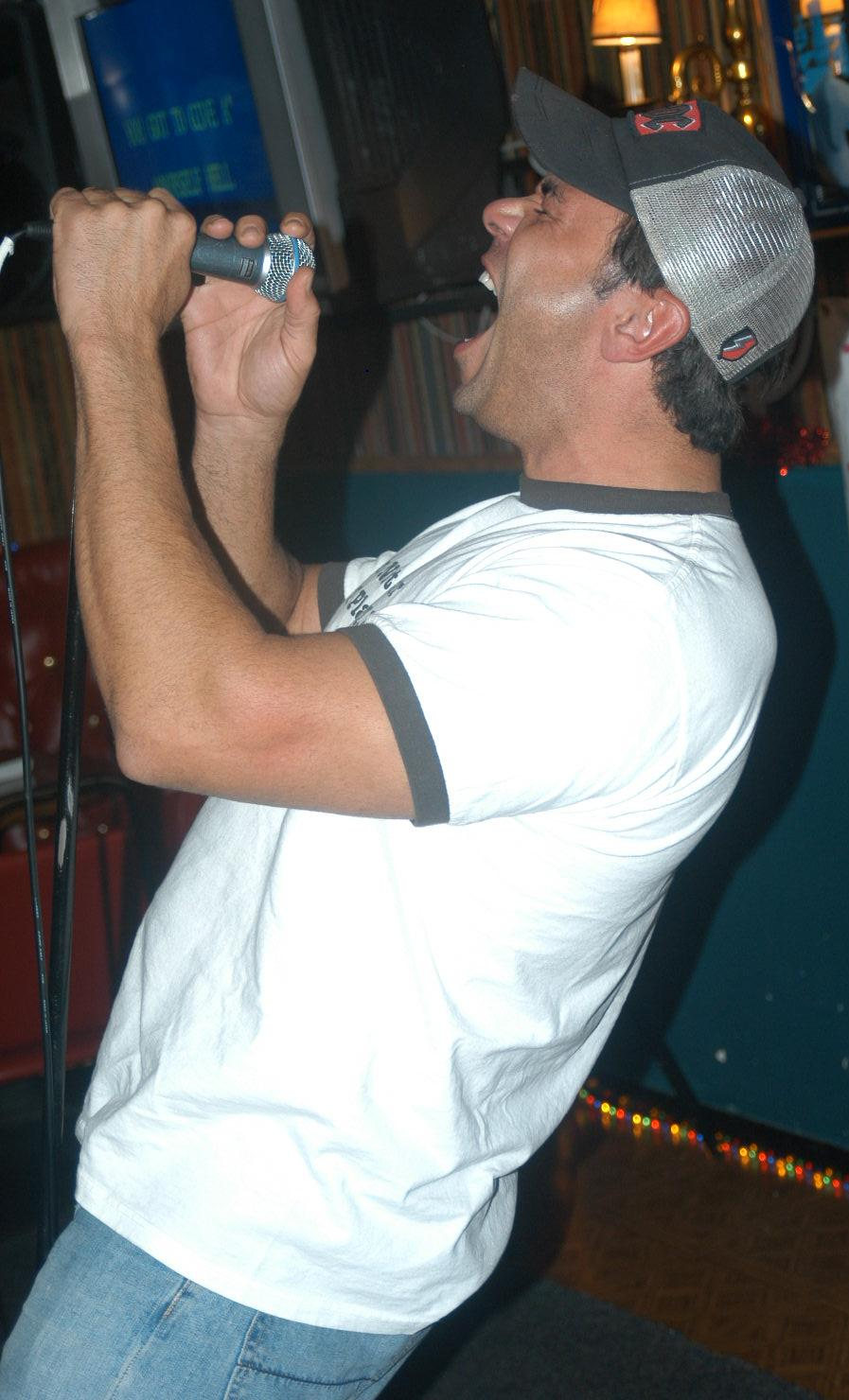
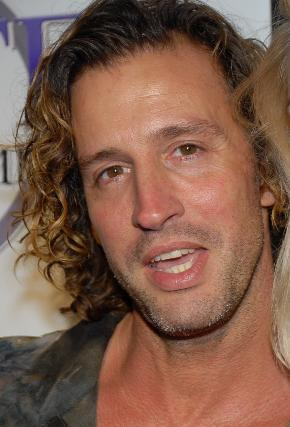
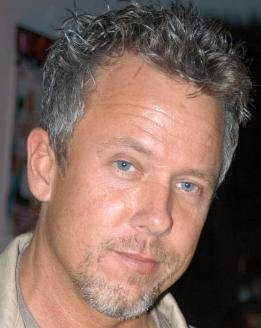
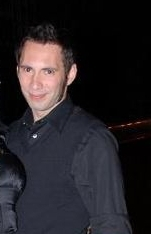
From top to bottom: Steven St. Croix, Tony Tedeschi, Tom Byron and Tommy Pistol have won the award three times each.
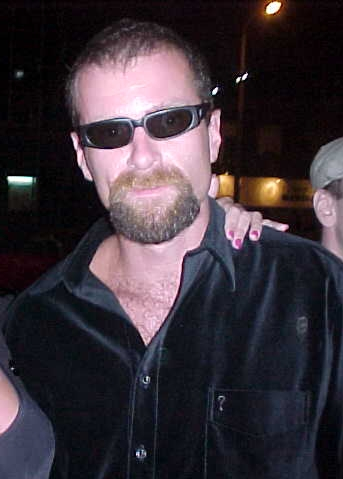
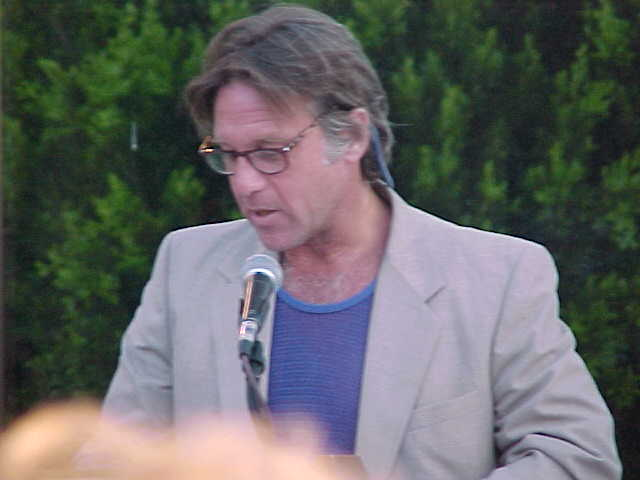
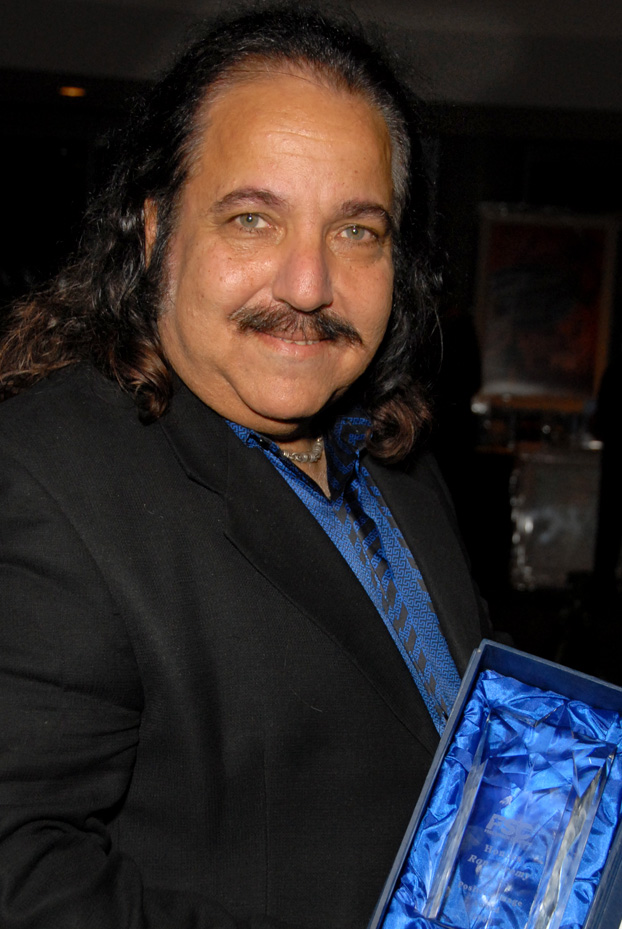
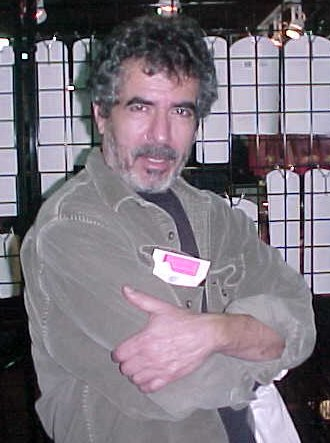
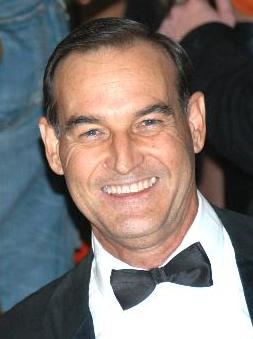
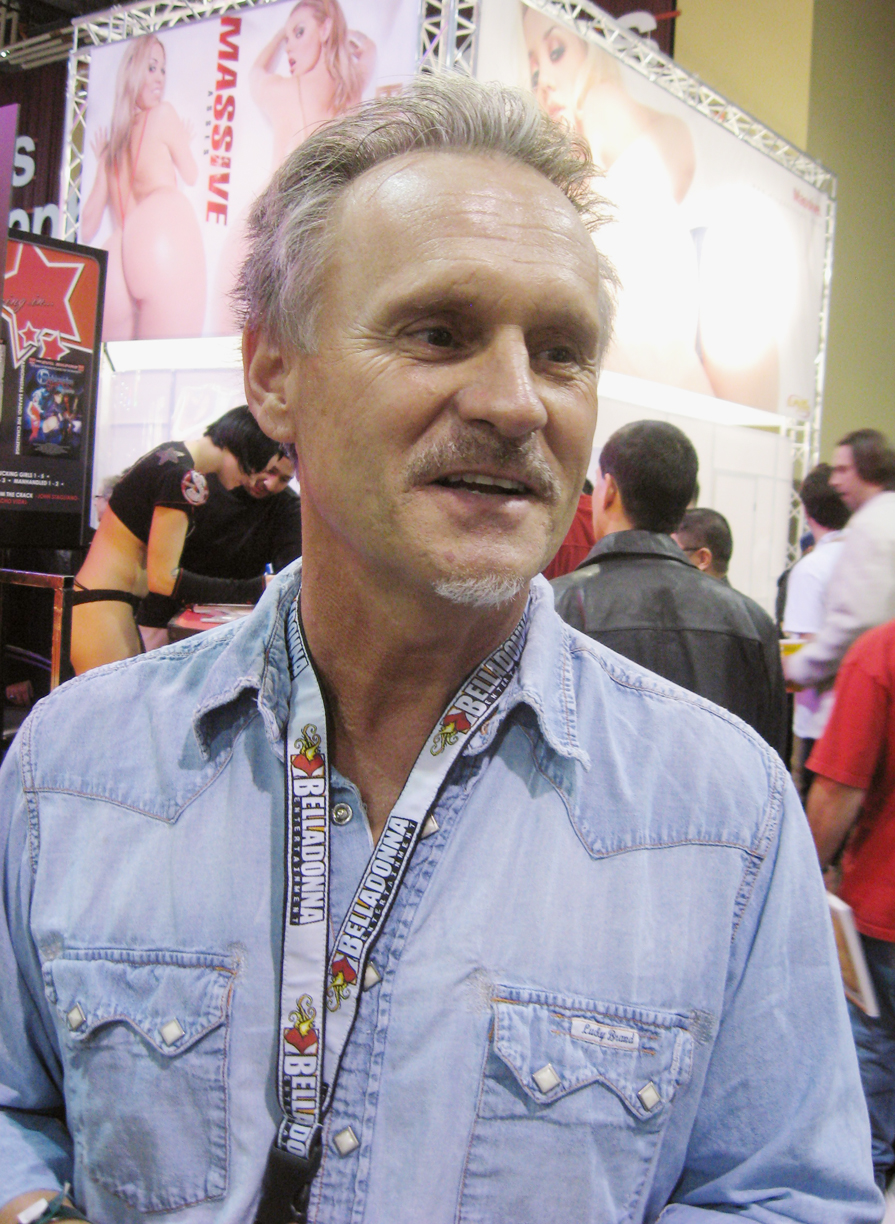
From top to bottom: Jon Dough, Richard Pacheco, Ron Jeremy, Jamie Gillis, Mike Horner and Joey Silvera have won the award two times each.

=== 1980s ===
Year	Photo	Winner	Film/Video	Nominees	Ref(s)
1984 (1st)		Richard Pacheco	Nothing to Hide (f)	–	
1985 (2nd)		John Leslie	Firestorm (f)	–	
1986 (3rd)		Ron Jeremy	Candy Stripers II (f)	–	
1987 (4th)		Joey Silvera	She's So Fine (f)	Robert Bullock, Sexually Altered States; Jamie Gillis, Thought You’d Never Ask; Herschel Savage, If My Mother Only Knew; Paul Thomas, Ecstasy Girls II	
1988 (5th)		Michael Gaunt	Firestorm II (f)	–	
1989 (6th)		Jamie Gillis	Pretty Peaches II (f)	Robert Bullock, Amanda by Night II; Billy Dee, Amanda by Night II; Mike Horner, Portrait of an Affair; Peter North, Pretty Peaches II	
1989 (6th)		Richard Pacheco	Sensual Escape (v)	Randy Paul, The Horneymooners; Rick Savage, Black Widow; Randy Spears, Case of the Sensuous Sinners; Ray Victory, Cat Woman	

=== 1990s ===
Year	Photo	Winner	Film/Video	Nominee(s)	Ref(s)
1990 (7th) †		Rick Savage	The Erotic Adventures of Berman & Throbbin (f)	–	
1990 (7th) †		Rick Savage	The Erotic Adventures of Berman & Throbbin (v)	–	
1991 (8th)		Jon Martin	Pretty Peaches 3 (f)	Buck Adams, Radioactive; Tom Byron, Torrid Without a Cause 2; Mike Horner, The Whore; Joey Silvera, The Whore	
1991 (8th)		Ron Jeremy	Playin' Dirty (v)	Buck Adams, Confessions of a Chauffeur; Jerry Butler, Steal Breeze; Jamie Gillis, Paris By Night; Mike Horner, Sex Trek 1; Joey Silvera, Strange Curves; Randy West, New Barbarians II	
1992 (9th)		Jon Dough	Brandy And Alexander (f)	T. T. Boy, Lethal Passion	
1992 (9th)		Mike Horner	Bite (v)	Jon Dough, Maddams Family	
1993 (10th)		Joey Silvera	Face Dance (Parts 1 & 2) (f)	Randy Spears, The Secret Garden 1 & 2	
1993 (10th)		Tony Tedeschi	Smeers (v)	–	
1994 (11th)		Steve Drake	Whispered Lies (f)	T. T. Boy, Sorority Sex Kittens 1 & 2; Nick East, Justine: Nothing to Hide 2; Steven St. Croix, Blind Spot; Rocco Siffredi, New Wave Hookers 3; Randy Spears, Centerfold	
1994 (11th)		Randy Spears	Haunted Nights (v)	Jamie Gillis, Slave to Love; Mike Horner, Surrogate Lover; Ron Jeremy, Puppy Love; Woody Long, Hungry, Parts 1 & 2; Rocco Siffredi, County Line; Joey Silvera, Cheerleader Nurses; Joey Silvera, Frat Girls of Double Double D; Terry Thomas, You Bet Your Buns; Marc Wallice, Guilty By Seduction	
1995 (12th)		Jon Dough	Sex (f)	Buck Adams, Bonny & Clyde 3 & 4; Jon Dough, Dog Walker; Tony Tedeschi, Hardcore; Marc Wallice, Who Killed Holly Hollywood?; Randy West, Masseuse 2	
1995 (12th)		Jonathan Morgan	The Face (v)	Mark Davis, Bad Habits; Nick East, Jailhouse Cock; Mike Horner, Body of Love; Jake Williams, Wendy Whoppers is the... Ninja CPA; Steven St. Croix	
1996 (13th)		Steven St. Croix	Forever Young (f)	–	
1996 (13th)		Alex Sanders	Dear Dirty (v)	Ron Jeremy, Fresh Meat; Jonathan Morgan, Sex Lives of Clowns; Joey Silvera, Sorority Stewardesses; Tony Tedeschi, Renegades; Tony Tedeschi, Risque Burlesque; Marc Wallice, Sloppy Seconds	
1997 (14th) †		Tony Tedeschi	The Show (f)	T. T. Boy, Lust and Desire; Jamie Gillis, Goldenrod; Tony Montana, Gangland Bangers; Jonathan Morgan, Penetrator 2: Grudge Day; Alex Sanders, Dangerous Games	
1997 (14th) †		Tony Tedeschi	Silver Screen Confidential (v)	Brad Armstrong, Conquest; Steve Hatcher, Stacked Deck; Jonathan Morgan, Anal Inquisition; Jonathan Morgan, Heinie's Heroes; Alex Sanders, Valentina; Joey Silvera, Nightshift Nurses 2; Jake Steed, Valentina	
1998 (15th)		Wilde Oscar	Doin' the Ritz (f)	Mark Davis, Corporate Assets 2; John Decker, Tight Spot; Jon Dough, Bad Wives; Mickey G., Satyr; Dave Hardman, Doin' The Ritz; Wilde Oscar, Twisted; Joey Silvera, Heat; Tony Tedeschi, Filth; Tony Tedeschi, The Heist	
1998 (15th)		Dave Hardman	Texas Dildo Masquerade (v)	Steve Austin, Swinging in the Rain; Tom Byron, Enchanted; Steve Drake, Uncontrollable Lust; Mickey G., Crazed; Steve Hatcher, Agent Muff ATF; Sean Michaels, Face Jam; Jonathan Morgan, Masters of Perversion; Peter North, Scotty's X-Rated Adventure; Kyle Stone, Lost Angels; Scott Styles, First Whore's Club	
1999 (16th)		Michael J. Cox	Models (f)	Mike Horner, Appassionata; J. D. Ram, Models; Herschel Savage, Masseuse 3; Tony Tedeschi, Mobster's Wife	
1999 (16th)		Jamie Gillis	Forever Night (v)	Brad Armstrong, Exile; T. T. Boy, Freak; Tom Byron, Hanky Panky; Ian Daniels, Date From Hell; Ron Jeremy, Nude World Order; Mickey G., Flashpont; Dave Hardman, X Factor 3; Jonathan Morgan, Nurse Sadie; Kyle Stone, To Live and Love in L.A.; Marc Wallice, Thai Me Up	

=== 2000s ===
Year	Photo	Winner	Film/Video	Nominees	Ref(s)
2000 (17th)		Michael J. Cox	Seven Deadly Sins (f)	James Bonn, Three; Tyce Buné, The Awakening; Chris Cannon, Chloe; David Perry, Talent Scout; Herschel Savage, The Trophy; Tony Tedeschi, Things Change 3	
2000 (17th)		Tom Byron	LA 399 (v)	Tyce Buné, Desiree; Alec Metro, The 69th Parallel; Jonathan Morgan, Desperate Measures; Alex Sanders, The Shark; Herschel Savage, The Kissing Game; Randy Spears, Vagina Town; Kyle Stone, Deception	
2001 (18th)		Randy Spears	Watchers (f)	James Bonn, The Bet; Michael J. Cox, Shakespeare Revealed; Dillion Day, Adrenaline; Nick East, A Midsummer Night's Cream; Herschel Savage, Screamers; Tony Tedeschi, Secret Party; Vince Vouyer, Facade	
2001 (18th)		Wilde Oscar	West Side (v)	Brad Armstrong, M Caught in the Act; Anthony Crane, Goddaughter 5; Dillion Day, West Side; Joel Lawrence, A Witch's Tail; Jonathan Morgan, A Lust in America; Herschel Savage, Exhibitionist Part 1; Evan Stone, Taboo of Tarot	
2002 (19th)		Herschel Savage	Taken (f)	James Bonn, Mafioso; Dale DaBone, Limbo; Gino Greco, Free Sex On Earth	
2002 (19th)		Mike Horner	Wild Thing (v)	Herschel Savage, Infidelity; Randy Spears, Immortal; Steven St. Croix, Wonderland; Evan Stone, Cap'n Mongo's Porno Playhouse	
2003 (20th)		Mr. Marcus	Paradise Lost (f)	Nick East, For Love Or Money; Manuel Ferrara, The Fashionistas; Mike Horner, Heartbreaker; Evan Stone, Paying The Piper	
2003 (20th)		Randy Spears	Hercules (v)	Brad Armstrong, Turning Point; Anthony Crane, Pleasureville 2: Shagnet; Ron Jeremy, Burnin 'Love; Joel Lawrence, Good Girl, Bad Girl; Eric Masterson, Morning Star / Perfect Couple; Herschel Savage, Big Bottom Sadie; Rocco Siffredi, The Ass Collector; Steven St. Croix, Breathless	
2004 (21st)		Steven St. Croix	Looking In (f)	Mr. Bigg, Compulsion; Dillon Day, Perfect; Steve Hatcher, Mirror Image; Eric Masterson, Virtual Love; Eric Price, Sordid	
2004 (21st)		Randy Spears	Space Nuts (v)	Steve Hatcher, Riptide; Mike Horner, Photo Club; Joel Lawrence, Carmen Goes to College; Eric Masterson, Sweet 101; Herschel Savage, The Contortionist; Rafe, It's Cumming; Steven St. Croix, Beautiful; Johnny Thrust, Little Runaway; Trevor Zen, Not A Romance	
2005 (22nd)		Rod Fontana	The 8th Sin (f)	Chris Cannon, Debbie Does Dallas: The Revenge; Dale DaBone, Sweethearts; Evan Stone, The Masseuse	
2005 (22nd)		Randy Spears	Fluff and Fold (v)	Chris Cannon, Ablaze; Rod Fontana, The Chunky Whisperer; Al Goldstein, Screwed; Nick Manning, Jackie and Jill; Herschel Savage, The Hitman; Steven St. Croix, Killer Sex & Suicide Blondes; Evan Stone, Misty Beethoven: The Musical; Torbe, Hot Rats	
2006 (23rd)		Randy Spears	Dark Side (f)	Dale DaBone, Les Bitches; Nick Manning, The Devil in Miss Jones; Eric Masterson, Eternity; Dick Smothers Jr., The Devil in Miss Jones; Steven St. Croix, Scorpio Rising; Evan Stone, Two Hot	
2006 (23rd)		Tommy Gunn	Pirates (v)	Dirty Harry, Texas' Asshole Massacre; Nick Manning, Tuff Chick; Eric Masterson, Camp Cuddly Pines Power Tool Massacre; Holly One, Who Fucked Rocco?; Steven St. Croix, Pirates; Evan Stone, Dark Angels 2: Bloodline; Tony Tedeschi, The Key to Sex	
2007 (24th)		Kurt Lockwood	To Die For (f)	Dale DaBone, Fade to Black 2; Van Damage, Fade to Black 2; Manuel Ferrara, To Die For; Chris Cannon, Manhunters	
2007 (24th)		Manuel Ferrara	She Bangs (v)	James Deen, Joanna Angel's Guide 2 Humping; Tommy Gunn, O: The Power of Submission; Mike Horner, Power Lines; Ron Jeremy, Motel Freaks; Kurt Lockwood, Sex Pix; Mr. Marcus, Joanna's Angels 2: Alt Throttle; Herschel Savage, Rumor Had 'Em; Randy Spears, Curse Eternal; Steven St. Croix, Blacklight Beauty; Evan Stone, Tailgunners; Lee Stone, Aphrodisiac; Tony Tedeschi, Get Luckier!; Trent Tesoro, Illicit; Nacho Vidal, Fashionistas Safado: The Challenge	
2008 (25th)		Randy Spears	Flasher (f)	Tyce Bune, Layout; Chris Cannon, Sex & Violins: Steven St. Croix, The Fashion Underground; Evan Stone, Debbie Does Dallas... Again; Trent Tesoro, Sex & Violins	
2008 (25th)		Barrett Blade	Coming Home (v)	Dino Bravo, The Skin Trade; Van Damage, Black Worm; Tommy Gunn, Kill Jill; Dirty Harry, Girlvert 14; Jack Lawrence, The Real Boogie Nights; Marcus London, Operation: Desert Stormy; Mr. Marcus, Afrodite Superstar; Eric Masterson, Candelabra; Derrick Pierce, Brianna Love: Her Fine Sexy Self; Herschel Savage, Spunk'd the Movie; Steven St. Croix, Spunk'd the Movie; Justin Sterling, Janine Loves Jenna; Brian Surewood, Ave X; Nacho Vidal, Fashionistas Safado: Berlin	
2009 (26th)		Ben English	Pirates II: Stagnetti's Revenge	James Deen, Ashlynn Goes to College; Seth Dickens, The Texas Vibrator Massacre; Rod Fontana, Get Smartass; Tommy Gunn, Pirates II: Stagnetti's Revenge; Jack Lawrence, Hearts and Minds II: Modern Warfare; Marcos Leon, Cry Wolf; Kurt Lockwood, The Chauffeur's Daughter; Marcus London, The Accidental Hooker; Nick Manning, Succubus of the Rouge; Sean Michaels, Succubus of the Rouge; Steven St. Croix, Pirates II: Stagnetti's Revenge; Evan Stone, Miles From Needles; Nat Turnher, Ransom; Voodoo, The Wicked	

=== 2010s ===
Year	Photo	Winner	Film	Nominees	Ref(s)
2010 (27th)		Tom Byron	Throat: A Cautionary Tale	Brad Armstrong, Hush; Dane Cross, The Office: A XXX Parody; Tony DeSergio, This Ain't Star Trek XXX; Shane Diesel, Scrubs: A XXX Parody; Tommy Gunn, This Ain't Happy Days XXX; Tyler Knight, The 8th Day; Marcus London, 2040; Jake Malone, Pure; Nick Manning, The Pinch; Pike Nelson, 70's Show: A XXX Parody; Herschel Savage, Heaven; Randy Spears, 2040; Evan Stone, Friends: A XXX Parody; Trent Treasure, Throat: A Cautionary Tale	
2011 (28th)		Evan Stone	Batman XXX: A Porn Parody	Mikey Butders, Official Jersey Shore Parody; Tom Byron, The Devil in Miss Jones: The Resurrection; Dane Cross, Couples Camp; James Deen, Batman XXX: A Porn Parody; Spyder Jonez, Speed; Tyler Knight, The A-Team XXX: A Parody; Byron Long, This Ain't the Barber Shop: It's a XXX Parody; Scott Lyons, The A-Team XXX: A Parody; Nick Manning, BatfXXX: Dark Night; Mickey Mod, An Open Invitation: A Real Swinger's Party in San Francisco; Danny Mountain, Awakening to Love; Anthony Rosano, Entourage: A XXX Parody; Keni Styles, Malice in Lalaland; Prince Yahshua, Fatally Obsessed	
2012 (29th)		Xander Corvus	Star Trek:The Next Generation - A XXX Parody	Chad Alva, Lost and Found; Lee Bang, Star Trek: The Next Generation - A XXX Parody; Otto Bauer, Beverly Hillbillies: A XXX Parody; Dick Delaware, Spider-Man XXX: A Porn Parody; Tommy Gunn, Fighters; Steve Holmes, Savanna Samson Is the Masseuse; Alec Knight, Elvis XXX: A Porn Parody; Mr. Marcus, Rocky XXX: A Parody Thriller!; Rocco Reed, Horizon; Anthony Rosano, The Flintstones: A XXX Parody; Randy Spears, The Rocki Whore Picture Show: A Hardcore Parody; Eric Swiss, Pervert; Michael Vegas, Dear Abby; Mark Wood, Official The Silence of the Lambs Parody	
2013 (30th)		Tom Byron	Star Wars XXX: A Porn Parody	Brad Armstrong, Men in Black; Xander Corvus, The Friend Zone; Dane Cross, Official The Hangover Parody; James Deen, Dallas XXX: A parody; Tony DeSergio, Spartacus MMXII: The beginning; Steve Holmes, Voracious; Nick Manning, Overnight; Brendon Miller, The Dark Knight XXX: A porn parody; Anthony Rosano, Romeo Juliet: A dreamzone parody: Lexington Steele, The Avengers XXX: A porn parody; Evan Stone, Pee-Wee's XXX Adventure: A by parody; Michael Vegas, Godfather: A dreamzone parody	
2014 (31st)		Xander Corvus	Underworld	Brad Armstrong, Sexpionage: The Drake Chronicles; Dick Chibbles, Not The Wizard of Oz XXX; Dane Cross, Not South Park XXX; Tommy Gunn, Meant to Be; Eric John, Barely Blue Velvet XXX: A XXX Parody; Marcus London, Divorcees; Ralph Long, Homecoming; Danny Mountain, Harvest Moon; Mr. Pete, The Stripper 2; Derrick Pierce, Underworld; Anthony Rosano, Not South Park XXX; D. Snoop, Devil on a Chain; Tee Reel, Love Boat XXX: A Parody; Nat Turnher, This Ain’t Homeland XXX	
2015 (32nd)		Xander Corvus	Holly...Would	Richie Calhoun, Apocalypse X: Dick Chibbles, Pornocopia; Jay Crew, Sleeping Beauty XXX: An Axel Braun Parody; Chad Diamond, Not Jersey Boys XXX A Porn Musical; Ryan Driller, Lollipop; Eric John, Not Jersey Boys XXX A Porn Musical; Alec Knight, Cape Fear XXX; Scott Lyons, Proud Parents; Ryan McLane, American Hustle XXX Porn Parody; Derrick Pierce, Apocalypse X; Will Powers, Cinderella XXX: An Axel Braun Parody; Anthony Rosano, The Pornographer; Evan Stone, Sweetness and Light; Chad White, Second Chances	
2016 (33rd)		Steven St. Croix	Peter Pan XXX: An Axel Braun Parody	Brad Armstrong, Starmaker; Xander Corvus, Safe Landings: Jay Crew, Peter Pan XXX: An Axel Braun Parody; Jake Jace, Love, Lust & Longing; Kurt Lockwood, Starmaker; Marcus London, Safe Landings; Eric Masterson, Wanted; Ryan McLane, Magic Mike XXXL: A Hardcore Parody; Brendon Miller, Batman v Superman XXX: An Axel Braun Parody; Mickey Mod, Marriage 2.0; Anthony Rosano, Bob’s Boners and Other Porn Parodies; Evan Stone, Just the Two of Us; Jack Vegas, Pretty Dangerous; Nacho Vidal, Monarch: Agents of Seduction	
2017 (34th)		Brad Armstrong	The Preacher's Daughter	Dick Chibbles, This Ain’t Fallout XXX; Damon Dice, Dark Secrets; Manuel Ferrara, The One I Lust; Seth Gamble, Suicide Squad: An Axel Braun Parody; Small Hands, DNA; Jake Jace, Win a Date With Sophia Blake; Jessy Jones, Sugarbabies: A Cautionary Tale; Alec Knight, Sex Machine: A XXX Parody; Isiah Maxwell, Keep It in the Family; Sean Michaels, This Ain’t American Horror Story XXX; Derrick Pierce, Supergirl XXX: An Axel Braun Parody; Logan Pierce, Forbidden Affairs 6: My Ex-Wife’s Daughter; Michael Vegas, Let It Ride; Van Wylde, The Submission of Emma Marx: Exposed	
2018 (35th)		Small Hands	Half His Age: A Teenage Tragedy	Mick Blue, Forbidden Opportunity; Johnny Castle, Lay Her Down; Xander Corvus, My Wife's Hot Sister; Robby Echo, Karma; Alec Knight, Bad Babes Inc; Brad Knight, Angry Wives Unleashed: Make Up Sex; Ryan McLane, Fathers & Daughters; Mickey Mod, Darker Side of Desire; Tyler Nixon, Justice League XXX: An Axel Braun Parody; Donnie Rock, Nouveau Riche; Jay Smooth, Spoiled; Michael Vegas, Unbridled; Van Wylde, The Submission of Emma Marx 4: Evolved; Prince Yahshua, Ethnicity	
2019 (36th)		Charles Dera	Cartel Sex	Chad Alva, Paparazzi; Lucas Frost, Family Holiday; Ricky Johnson, Cheaters; Jessy Jones, How I Fucked Your Mother: A XXX Parody; Tyler Knight, Timing Is Everything; Marcus London, Infidelity 2; Logan Long, The Seduction of Heidi; Eric Masterson, The Seduction of Heidi; Isiah Maxwell, Hand Solo: A DP XXX Parody; Tyler Nixon, Making Ends Meet; Donnie Rock, Trashy Love Story; Jay Smooth, Tell Me Something Dirty; Evan Stone, Meet the Fuckers: A Digital Playground XXX Parody; Nacho Vidal, Fly Girls: Final Payload	

=== 2020s ===
Year	Photo	Winner	Film	Nominees	Ref(s)
2020 (37th)		Tommy Pistol	The Gang Makes a Porno: A DP XXX Parody	Jake Adams, Love Emergency; Chad Alva, Doppelganger; Brad Armstrong, Love Emergency; Mick Blue, A Night of Reckoning; Nathan Bronson, Choice; Ryan Driller, Lost Love; Quinton James, Captain Marvel XXX: An Axel Braun Parody; Marcus London, Uninvited; Chad White, The Gentleman	
2021 (38th)		Xander Corvus	The Summoning	Brad Armstrong, Finding Rebecca; Dante Colle, A Killer on the Loose; Stirling Cooper, Obsessed; Damon Dice, Stranger Than Fiction; Small Hands, Primary; Lance Hart, Some TS Like It Hot; Scott Nails, Exit 118; Brad Newman, Don't Say a Word; Zac Wild, Catfished 2	
2022 (39th)		Tommy Pistol	Casey: A True Story	AJ, Muse Season 2; Stirling Cooper, Survive the Night; Charles Dera, Casey: A True Story; Manuel Ferrara, Muse Season 2; Oliver Flynn, Psychosexual; Steve Holmes, Under the Veil; Ricky Johnson, Red Light Arena; Ryan Mclane, Toxic; Michael Vegas, Kill Code 87	
2023 (40th)		Tommy Pistol	Grinders	Mick Blue, Drift; Nathan Bronson, One Night in Los Angeles; Dante Colle, Torn; Tyler Cruise, SpideyPool XXX: An Axel Braun Parody; Robby Echo, Grinders; Peter Green, Shoot Your Shot; Quinton James, I Love You, You’re Fired; Ryan Mclane, The Voyeur 5; Tyler Nixon, Mommy's Boys	
2024 (41st)		Danny D	Space Junk	Robby Apples, Hang in There, Abigail; Nathan Bronson, Privilege; Dillon Diaz, Ashford Manor; Damon Dice, Hang in There, Abigail; Alex Jones, Machine Gunner; Nade Nasty, The Seductress 4; Will Pounder, Redemption; Codey Steele, Primary 3; Lexington Steele, Reckless	
2025 (42nd)		Nathan Bronson	Ulterior Motives	Robby Apples, Sunny Goldmelons; Xander Corvus, Evermore; Seth Gamble, So Extra!; Alex Jones, Gold Diggers; Scott Nails, Dirty Cops; Ramón Nomar, Dysfunctional Family Values 2: Family First; Derrick Pierce, Amuse Bouche; Tommy Pistol, So Extra!; Zac Wild, Sweethearts	
2026 (43rd)		Ken Feels	Once Upon a Time in the Valley	Nathan Bronson, Cheaters Anonymous; Danny D, Ghosted; Charles Dera, The Secrets We Share; Ryan Driller, Silver Linings; Seth Gamble, Bucket List; Tommy Pistol, Play; Victor Ray, Wanted; Codey Steele, Clout; Lexington Steele, Payback’s a Bitch	

== Superlatives ==
Superlative	Actor	Record
Actor with most awards	Randy Spears	7
Actor with most consecutive wins	Randy Spears (2003-06)	4
Oldest winner	Jamie Gillis	55
Youngest winner	Xander Corvus	23
Winner of the most decades	Steven St. Croix (1990s, 2000s, 2010s)	3

== Multiple winners ==
Wins	Actor	Wins
7	Randy Spears	1994, 2001, 2003, 2004, 2005, 2006, 2008
4	Xander Corvus	2012, 2014, 2015, 2021
3	Steven St. Croix	1996, 2004, 2016
3	Tony Tedeschi	1993, 1997 (2)
3	Tom Byron	2000, 2010, 2013
3	Tommy Pistol	2020, 2022, 2023
2	Richard Pacheco	1984, 1989
2	Ron Jeremy	1986, 1991
2	Jamie Gillis	1989, 1999
2	Mike Horner	1992, 2002
2	Jon Dough	1992, 1995
2	Michael J. Cox	1999, 2000
2	Wilde Oscar	1998, 2001
2	Joey Silvera	1987, 1993
2	Rick Savage	1990 (2)

== See also ==
- AVN Award for Best Actor, an award that has been given by sex industry company AVN since the award's inception in 1984
- AVN Award for Male Performer of the Year, an award that has been given by sex industry company AVN since the award's inception in 1993
- AVN Award for Male Foreign Performer of the Year, an award that has been given by sex industry company AVN since the award's inception in 2003
