= Ryan Driller =

American pornographic actor

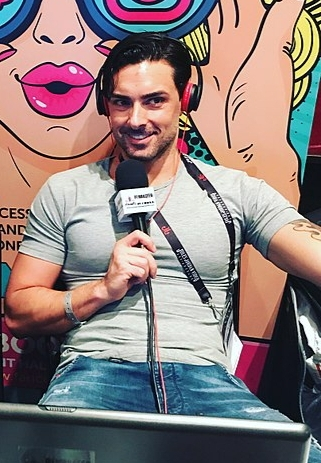
- During an interview in 2018.
- Born: Adam Cuculich; August 17, 1982 (age 43); Littleton, Colorado, U.S.
- Other names: Adam Driller, Jeremy Bilding, Ryan
- Occupation: pornographic actor
- Years active: 2008–present
- Notable work: Superman vs. Spider-Man XXX: An Axel Braun Parody; Marriage 2.0
- Height: 6 ft 1 in (1.85 m)

Adam Cuculich (born August 17, 1982), known by the stage names Ryan Driller and Jeremy Bilding, is an American pornographic actor who has appeared in both straight and gay pornography. In 2016, he received the XBIZ Award for Male Performer of the Year. Men's Health has described him as "one of the biggest names in the industry".

== Early life ==
Cuculich was born and raised in Littleton, Colorado. At 18, he moved to Key West, Florida, where he lived for seven years. He was a member of the Boy Scouts. Before entering the adult film industry, he worked as a radio promotions coordinator.

== Career ==
Cuculich entered the adult film industry after reaching out to agents about performing and receiving replies. He has performed in straight pornography under the name Ryan Driller, and in gay pornography under the name Jeremy Bilding. He appeared in an episode of The Burn with Jeff Ross, in which Ross did a comedy skit during one of Driller's porn shoots.

== Personal life ==
Although he was raised Catholic, Driller stated he does not subscribe to any specific religious views. He voiced his support for Hillary Clinton in the 2016 United States presidential election.

== Partial filmography ==
=== Film ===
Year	Title	Role	Notes
2012	Superman vs. Spider-Man XXX: An Axel Braun Parody	Superman	
2013	Criminal Desires	James Mason	Television film
2013	Intergalactic Swingers	Steve	
2014	Stacked Racks from Mars	D'Angelo	
2015	Carnal Wishes	Eric	Television film
2015	Marriage 2.0	Eric	
2016	Bikini Model Mayhem	Sterling	
2017	Bedroom Eyes	Vince	Television film

=== Television ===
Year	Title	Role	Notes
2010	The Millionaire Matchmaker	Adam	Guest role in Season 3
2012	Foursome	Adam	
2012	The Burn with Jeff Ross	Himself	
2012—2014	Project: Phoenix	Viktor	Web series. Credited as Adam Cuculich.

== Awards and nominations ==
List of accolades received by Ryan Driller
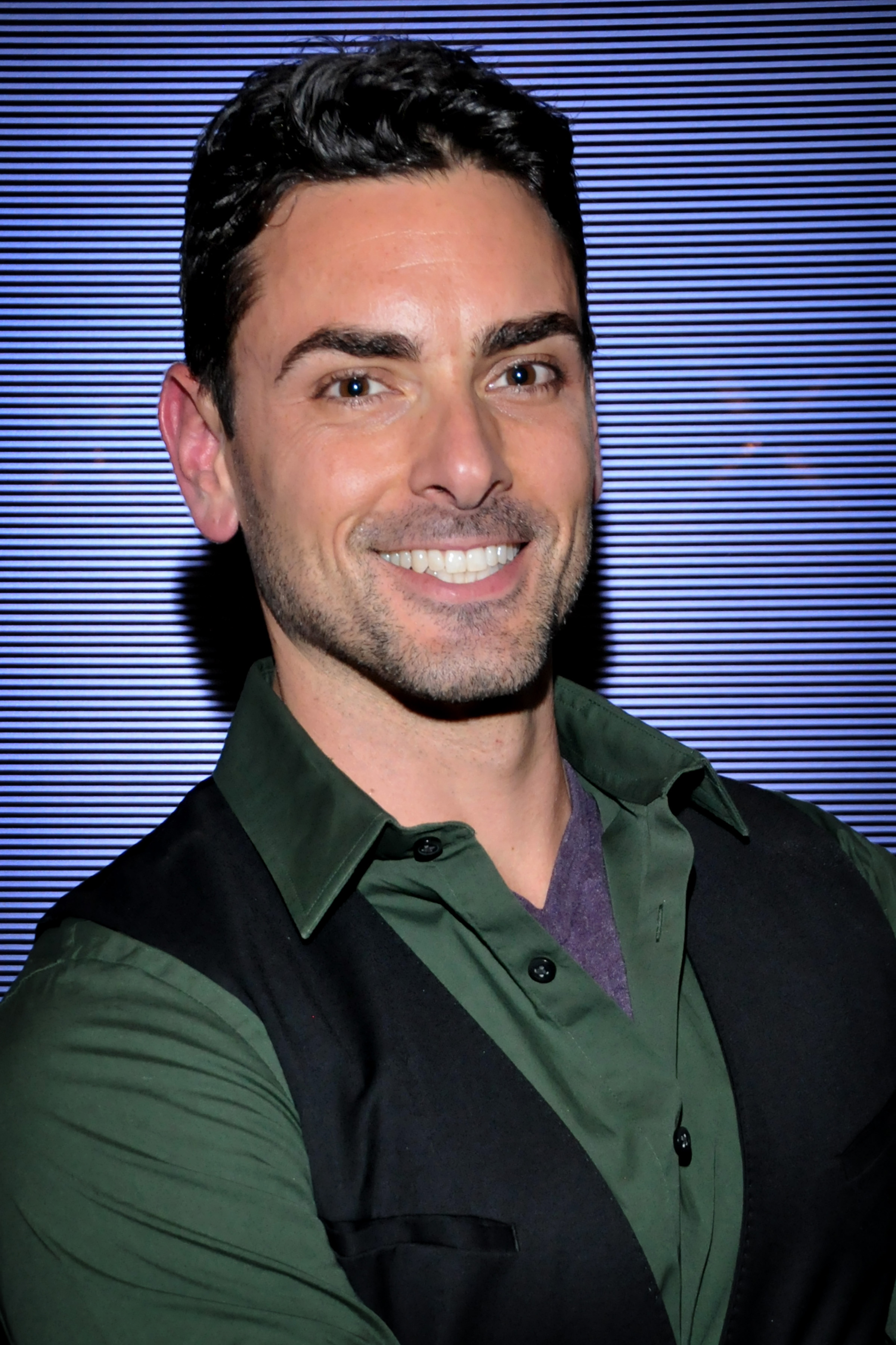
- Driller at XBIZ Award ceremony in 2016
Awards and nominations
Award	Won	Nominated
AVN Awards	1	20
NightMoves Awards	1	3
XBIZ Awards	6	39
XRCO Awards	0	5
Erotic Lounge Awards	0	1
Sex Awards	0	1
The Fannys Awards	0	2
Xcritic Awards	1	1
Other awards	0	1
- Total number of wins and nominations
Totals	9	73

AVN Awards
Year	Result	Award	Film
2011	Nominated	Best Male Newcomer	—N/a
2011	Nominated	Best Non-Sex Performance	Awakening to Love
2012	Nominated	Best Actor	Superman XXX: A Porn Parody
2014	Nominated	Best Actor	Man of Steel XXX: An Axel Braun Parody
2014	Nominated	Male Performer of the Year	—N/a
2015	Nominated	Best Boy/Girl Sex Scene (with Aaliyah Love)	Modern Romance
2015	Nominated	Best Supporting Actor	Lollipop
2015	Nominated	Favourite Male Porn Star (Fan Award)	—N/a
2016	Nominated	Best Actor	Marriage 2.0
2016	Nominated	Best Three-Way Sex Scene – B/B/G (with Alison Tyler & Giovanni Francesco)	Batman v Superman XXX: An Axel Braun Parody
2016	Nominated	Favorite Male Porn Star (Fan Award)	—N/a
2017	Nominated	Best Actor	True Detective: A XXX Parody
2017	Nominated	Best Three-Way Sex Scene – Boy/Boy/Girl	Revenge Fuck (IV)
2017	Nominated	Male Performer of the Year	—N/a
2018	Nominated	Best Actor	Inconvenient Mistress
2018	Nominated	Best Three Way Sex Scene – Boy/Boy/Girl	Inconvenient Mistress
2018	Nominated	Best Virtual Reality Sex Scene	Fuck Bill
2019	Nominated	Best Actor – Feature	The Seduction of Heidi
2019	Nominated	Best Virtual Reality Sex Scene	Do You Wanna Play Truth or Dare
2019	Nominated	Best Group Sex Scene	Fallen 2
2019	Won	Best Group Sex Scene	After Dark

NightMoves Awards
Year	Result	Award	Film
2014	Nominated	Best Male Performer	—N/a
2014	Nominated	Best Male Performer (Fan Choice)	—N/a
2015	Nominated	Best Male Performer	—N/a
2015	Won	Best Male Performer (Fan Choice)	—N/a

XBIZ Awards
Year	Result	Award	Film
2010	Nominated	Gay Performer of the Year	—N/a
2014	Nominated	Best Actor – Parody Release	Man of Steel XXX: An Axel Braun Parody
2014	Won	Best Scene – Parody Release (with Kendall Karson)	Man of Steel XXX: An Axel Braun Parody
2014	Nominated	Best Actor – Couples-Themed Release	Paint
2015	Nominated	Best Supporting Actor	Aftermath
2015	Nominated	Best Scene – Parody Release (with Riley Steele)	Snow White XXX: An Axel Braun Parody
2016	Won	Male Performer of the Year	—N/a
2016	Nominated	Best Actor – Feature Release	Marriage 2.0
2016	Won	Best Sex Scene – Feature Release (with India Summer)	Marriage 2.0
2016	Nominated	Best Actor – Parody Release	Batman v. Superman XXX: An Axel Braun Parody
2016	Nominated	Best Sex Scene – Parody Release (with Alison Tyler & Giovanni Francesco)	Batman v. Superman XXX: An Axel Braun Parody
2016	Won	Best Sex Scene – Parody Release (with Kimberly Kane)	Wonder Woman XXX: An Axel Braun Parody
2016	Nominated	Best Sex Scene – Couples-Themed Release (with Karlie Montana)	When It Comes to You
2017	Nominated	Best Actor – Feature Release	Trouble X 2
2017	Nominated	Best Actor – Parody Release	Supergirl XXX: An Axel Braun Parody
2017	Nominated	Best Actor – Parody Release	This Ain't American Horror Story XXX
2017	Nominated	Best Sex Scene – Couples-Themed Release	New Beginnings
2017	Nominated	Best Sex Scene – Feature Release	DNA
2017	Nominated	Best Sex Scene – Feature Release	The J.O.B.
2017	Nominated	Best Sex Scene – Feature Release	Trouble X 2
2017	Won	Best Sex Scene – Vignette Release (with Elsa Jean)	All Natural Saints
2017	Nominated	Best Sex Scene – Vignette Release	Naughty Rich Girls 15
2017	Nominated	Best Supporting Actor	New Beginnings
2017	Nominated	Best Supporting Actor	The Submission of Emma Marx 3: Exposed
2017	Nominated	Male Performer of the Year	—N/a
2018	Nominated	Best Actor – Comedy Release	Consequences of a Kiss
2018	Nominated	Best Actor – Couples-Themed Release	Consequences of a Kiss
2018	Nominated	Best Actor – Couples-Themed Release	Stripped Down
2018	Nominated	Best Actor – Feature Release	Inconvenient Mistress
2018	Nominated	Best Actor – Feature Release	Justice League XXX: An Axel Braun Parody
2018	Nominated	Best Sex Scene – All-Sex Release	Covergirls Blonde Seduction
2018	Nominated	Best Sex Scene – Couples-Themed Release	Consequences of a Kiss
2018	Won	Best Sex Scene – Couples-Themed Release (with Gracie Glam)	It's Complicated
2018	Nominated	Best Sex Scene – Couples-Themed Release	Unbridled
2018	Nominated	Best Sex Scene – Feature Release	Inconvenient Mistress
2018	Nominated	Best Sex Scene – Feature Release	Takers
2018	Nominated	Best Sex Scene – Virtual Reality	Spring Break 2017
2018	Nominated	Male Performer of the Year	—N/a
2019	Nominated		
2019	Nominated	Best Actor – Couples-Themed Release	Insomnia
2019	Nominated	Best Actor – Couples-Themed Release	The Game
2019	Nominated	Best Sex Scene – All-Sex Release	Carnal
2019	Nominated	Best Sex Scene – All-Sex Release	Sometimes I Share
2019	Nominated	Best Sex Scene – Couples-Themed Release	Insomnia
2019	Nominated	Best Sex Scene – Virtual Reality	Do You Want to Play Truth or Dare?
2019	Nominated	Best Supporting Actor	Naked

XRCO Awards
Year	Result	Award	Film
2010	Nominated	New Stud	—N/a
2011	Nominated	New Stud	—N/a
2014	Nominated	Best Actor	Man Of Steel XXX
2016	Nominated	Best Actor	Marriage 2.0
2017	Nominated	Male Performer of the Year	—N/a
