= Oscar Wilde (disambiguation) =

Oscar Wilde (1854–1900) was an Irish playwright, novelist, poet, and author of short stories.

Oscar Wilde may also refer to:

- Oscar Wilde (film), a 1960 biographical film
- Oscar Wilde (play), a 1936 English play
- "Oscar Wilde", a song by the Cat Empire from Stolen Diamonds, 2019
- Oscar Wilde Bookshop, a bookstore devoted to gay and lesbian authors
- MS Oscar Wilde, three ships bearing the name

== See also ==
- Wilde (film), a 1997 biographical film about Oscar Wilde
- The Trials of Oscar Wilde, a 1960 British film
- Wilde Oscar (born 1967), pornographic actor
