= Ignacio Fernández =

Ignacio Fernández may refer to:

- Ignacio Fernández Lobbe (born 1974), Argentine rugby union player
- Ignacio Allende Fernández aka Torbe (born 1969), Spanish porn actor, director, and businessman
- Ignacio Fernández (born 1990), Argentine footballer
- Ignacio Fernández Esperón (1894–1968), Mexican composer
- Ignacio Fernández Rodríguez (born 1980), Spanish former footballer
- Ignacio Fernández Rouyet (born 1978), Argentina-born Italian rugby union player
- Ignacio Fernández Sánchez (1922–2012), Spanish actor, director, and comedian
- Ignacio Fernández Toxo (born 1952), Spanish activist, currently General Secretary of the Workers' Commissions Union (CCOO)
- José Ignacio "Nacho" Fernández (born 1990), Spanish international footballer
- José Ignacio Fernández Palacios (born 1967), Spanish former footballer
