= Superman vs. Spider-Man XXX =

Superman vs. Spider-Man XXX: An Axel Braun Parody
- Promotional poster
- Directed by: Axel Braun
- Written by: Axel Braun; Mark Logan
- Based on: Superman vs. The Amazing Spider-Man by: DC Comics; Marvel Comics
- Produced by: Axel Braun
- Starring: Ryan Driller; Xander Corvus; Andy San Dimas
- Cinematography: Axel Braun
- Edited by: Axel Braun; Mrs. Braun; Claudia Ross
- Music by: Axel Braun
- Production company: Vivid Superhero
- Distributed by: Vivid Entertainment
- Release date: 2012
- Running time: 139 minutes
- Country: United States
- Language: English

Superman vs. Spider-Man XXX: An Axel Braun Parody is a 2012 pornographic superhero comedy film. Superman (Ryan Driller) must work together with Spider-Man (Xander Corvus), when super villains Lex Luthor (Eric Masterson) and Dr. Octopus (James Bartholet) join forces to attempt to achieve world domination. Lex Luthor is assisted in his evil plot by Eve Tesmacher (Alexis Texas). Lois Lane (Andy San Dimas) is taken hostage and held captive. Superman and Spider-Man are lured into a trap by the villains, and ultimately rescued by Spider-Woman (Jenna Presley).

Film director and writer Axel Braun based the film on the 1976 comic book, Superman vs. The Amazing Spider-Man, and marketed the film using a DVD cover paying homage to the original comic book. University of Toronto Cinema Studies Institute professor Dru Jeffries analyzed the film in a case study published in 2016 in the academic journal Porn Studies. Jeffries wrote that Braun's work showcased, "a unique point of intersection between Hollywood, the porn industry, and fandom." The 2020 book Supersex: Sexuality, Fantasy, and the Superhero discussed the film as evidence of a common trope in similar parody films within the genre, where female characters are unable to avoid succumbing to the seduction of the male hero protagonists.

The film received a generally positive reception, with Phoenix New Times placing it among, "The Five Best XXX Superhero Parodies". Inverse praised the film's special effects. BuzzFeed observed Braun's work may be the only medium fans could see specific storylines adapted for film. Uproxx called it "a damn good movie". Cultture put it along with "the 5 most exciting superhero porn parodies". The movie was recognized within the adult film industry with the NightMoves Award for Best Parody, the XRCO Award for Best Parody, and the XBIZ Award for Parody Release of the Year.

== Plot summary ==
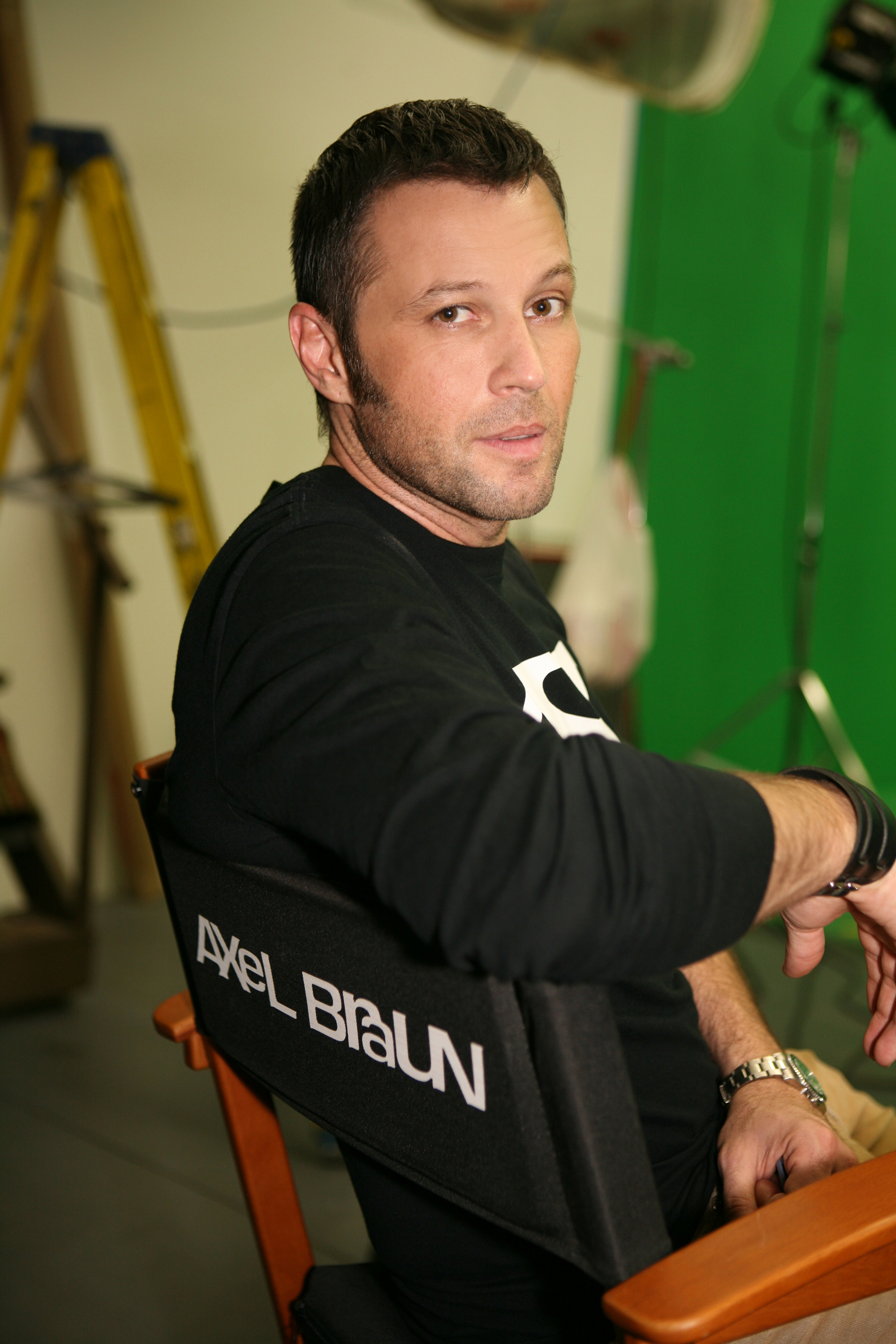
Film director Axel Braun

Superman (Ryan Driller) must work together with Spider-Man (Xander Corvus), when super villains Lex Luthor (Eric Masterson) and Dr. Octopus (James Bartholet) join forces to attempt to achieve world domination. Lex Luthor is assisted in his evil plot by Eve Tesmacher (Alexis Texas).

Luthor and Dr. Octopus work together, after becoming frustrated with Superman and Spider-Man each individually foiling their plans. They plot with each other to work together after meeting in prison. Lois Lane (Andy San Dimas) is taken hostage and held captive. Superman and Spider-Man are pitted into a situation where they temporarily are at odds with each other and engage in a short fight.

Black Cat (Jazy Berlin) discovers Spider-Man monitoring the city on the top of a roof of a building and the two briefly scuffle before subsequently engaging in intimate relations. Superman and Spider-Man are helped in their quest to combat Luthor and Dr. Octopus by super heroines including Supergirl (Kagney Lynn Karter) and Spider-Woman (Jenna Presley).

Supergirl surprises Luthor and Tesmacher and enters their hideout. Luthor launches two rockets into the city. He then places Kryptonite in a necklace around Supergirl, rendering her disabled. After Luthor leaves the room, Supergirl convinces Tesmacher to help her. After the two have a romantic tête-à-tête, Tesmacher renders assistance to Supergirl.

Superman appears outside the terrace of the apartment shared by Spider-Man's alter ego Peter Parker and his girlfriend Mary Jane Watson (Capri Anderson). Inside, Watson and Liz Osborn (Lily Labeau) are in the middle of a discussion. Superman explains he needs to find Spider-Man and get his help to rescue Lois Lane. Before helping him, Watson and Osborn have sex with Superman and each other.

Superman takes Spider-Man to the headquarters for Luthor and Dr. Octopus to attempt to rescue Lois. Unbeknownst to them, Luthor and Dr. Octopus have laid a trap for the two heroes. Spider-Man is held captive, and Superman is subdued after Dr. Octopus attacks him with tentacles laden with Kryptonite. Luthor threatens to kill Superman if Lois does not submit to his advances. She does, but then he decides to kill Superman anyway.

Spider-Woman appears and breaks into the headquarters of the villains. She successfully rescues Superman, Spider-Man, and Lois. Spider-Man briefly argues with Spider-Woman about who actually saved everyone, before agreeing Spider-Woman saved the day. Then they have sex. Afterwards, in an unknown location, Harry Osborn (Michael Vegas) is shown retrieving his Green Goblin mask from a chest.

== Cast ==
- Xander Corvus as Spider-Man/Peter Parker
- Ryan Driller as Superman/Clark Kent
- Andy San Dimas as Lois Lane
- Alexis Texas as Eve Tesmacher
- Kagney Lynn Karter as Supergirl
- Jenna Presley as Spider-Woman
- Capri Anderson as Mary Jane Watson
- Lily Labeau as Liz Osborn
- Jazy Berlin as Black Cat
- Eric Masterson as Lex Luthor
- James Bartholet as Dr. Octopus
- Sarah Shevon as Betty Brant
- Michael Vegas as Harry Osborn
- Robert Black as J. Jonah Jameson
- Will Ryder as Perry White

== Production ==
Superman vs. The Amazing Spider-Man cover (1976)

Superman vs. Spider-Man XXX: An Axel Braun Parody (2012)

Axel Braun modeled his marketing material for the film after the original cover for Superman vs. The Amazing Spider-Man (1976).

The film is the first of several films by Vivid Entertainment to feature parodies of well-known superhero portrayals in movies and television. The positive reaction to the film caused Vivid to announce plans for an entire line of similar films, to be released under the Axel Braun-led imprint Vivid Superhero. Braun based the film on the 1976 comic book, Superman vs. The Amazing Spider-Man. In subsequent marketing materials, Braun utilized an homage to the precise cover design style from the original 1976 comic edition to promote his film parody. The film was released in November 2012.

== Themes ==
Alexandre Hervaud commented for French language Slate that some comic book aficionados might take umbrage at the crossing of universes between Superman from DC Comics and Spider-Man from Marvel Comics. He wrote therefore that viewers might criticize the writing style due to the two characters inability to fight in the same universe. Hervaud pointed out that the two characters had previously interacted before in 1976, in a comic book, Superman vs The Amazing Spider-Man. University of Toronto Cinema Studies Institute professor Dru Jeffries analyzed the film in a case study published in 2016 in the academic journal Porn Studies. He commented, "Contemporary superhero porn parodies, particularly those directed by Axel Braun, eschew the goofy puns and tacked-on themes that had previously defined the pornographic parody genre. These films present a unique point of intersection between Hollywood, the porn industry, and fandom." Jeffries observed, "Braun's parodies appropriate transformative textual practices usually associated with female fan productivity in order to seduce male fans, while also exploiting the industrial limitations of the mainstream superhero genre, and capitalizing on the legal freedoms afforded by their parody status." The 2020 book Supersex: Sexuality, Fantasy, and the Superhero discussed the film as evidence of a common trope in similar parody films within the genre, where female characters are unable to avoid succumbing to the seduction of the male hero protagonists. Supersex observed, "Braun and the fans of his parodies want to see ... traditional (read: patriarchal) gender roles and hierarchies."

== Reception ==
=== Critical response ===
Geekscape writer Derek Kraneveldt favorably reviewed the trailer to the movie, writing, "it's sure to please comic fans" and "porn viewers alike!" Kraneveldt wrote that it was "hilarious". Writing for Phoenix New Times in 2013, journalist Benjamin Leatherman placed the film among "The Five Best XXX Superhero Parodies". Emily Gaudette wrote for Inverse that the film had "impressive" special effects. Tessa Stuart of BuzzFeed wrote some individuals would want to watch the parody, "Because it's the only way some fans will ever get to see their favorite characters or storylines adapted for film." In a piece for Uproxx, senior writer Ashley Burns observed, "Superman Vs. Spider-Man XXX looks great". He wrote, "Braun makes a damn good movie ... that also has a lot of sex in it." Burns commented, "Sure, if you take away all of the sex, you've probably got a SyFy original on your hands, but that's pretty great for an adult film." Cultture highlighted the film as part of "the 5 most exciting superhero porn parodies". Cultture wrote, "Superman vs Spider-Man XXX: One of the great cross-overs that may have been read in the superhero comic also took place in the cinematic world of porn parodies, with the evil Lex Luthor and Doctor Octopus teaming up to face their nemesis." Chris Nieratko reviewed the film for Vice, and was appreciative of Braun's referencing the 1976 comic book edition where Superman meets Spider-Man. Nieratko wrote positively of a scene where Black Cat is shown pleasuring Spider-Man on the top of an edifice.

=== Accolades ===
Year	Ceremony	Category	Recipient(s)	Result	Notes
2013	NightMoves Award	Best Parody – Superhero (Editor's Choice)	—N/a	Won	
2013	XRCO Awards	Best Parody (Comic)	—N/a	Won	
2014	AVN Awards	Best Art Direction	—N/a	Nominated	
2014	AVN Awards	Best Parody – Drama	Axel Braun	Nominated	
2014	AVN Awards	Best Screenplay – Parody	Axel Braun; Mark Logan	Nominated	
2014	AVN Awards	Best Special Effects	—N/a	Nominated	
2014	XBIZ Awards	Parody Release of the Year – Drama	—N/a	Won	
2014	XBIZ Awards	Director of the Year – Parody	Axel Braun	Nominated	
2014	XBIZ Awards	Best Actress – Parody Release	Andy San Dimas	Nominated	
2014	XBIZ Awards	Best Actor – Parody Release	Xander Corvus	Nominated	
2014	XBIZ Awards	Best Supporting Actress	Alexis Texas	Nominated	
2014	XBIZ Awards	Best Scene – Parody Release	Andy San Dimas & Eric Masterson	Nominated	
2014	XBIZ Awards	Best Art Direction	—N/a	Nominated	
2014	XBIZ Awards	Best Special Effects	—N/a	Nominated	
2014	XBIZ Awards	Best Music	Axel Braun	Nominated	
2014	XBIZ Awards	Best Editing	Axel Braun, Mrs. Braun, Claudia Ross	Nominated	
2014	XBIZ Awards	Marketing Campaign of the Year	—N/a	Nominated	

== See also ==
- Bat Pussy
- BatfXXX: Dark Night Parody
- Batman XXX: A Porn Parody
- Spider-Man XXX: A Porn Parody
- This Ain't Avatar XXX
