= Kurt Lockwood =

American pornographic actor and director (born 1970)

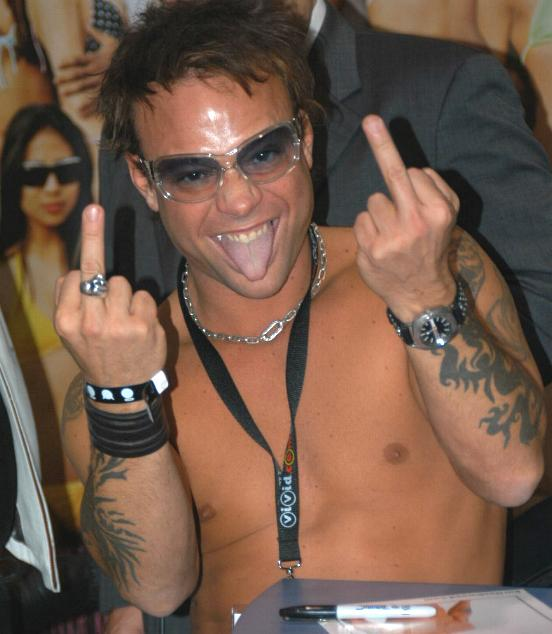
- Lockwood at the AVN Adult Entertainment Expo in Las Vegas, Nevada in 2007
- Born: June 4, 1970 (age 56); Baltimore, Maryland, U.S.
- Other names: Stevie Sexy Christ, Kirt Lockwood, Mr. E, Kurt Blockwood, Kurt
- Height: 5 ft 10 in (1.78 m)

Kurt Lockwood (born June 4, 1970) is an American pornographic actor and director, model, and musician.

== Career ==
In 2002, Hustler magazine director Chris Wood offered him the starring role in his own line for Larry Flynt Digital in a now-defunct online series (www.trailertrash.com). He performed sixty scenes as "Johnny Coxville", a parody of the Jackass star Johnny Knoxville. In addition, he was featured on pornographic actor Seymore Butts’ Showtime cable reality television show Family Business in six episodes in 2005 as well as being featured in pictorial layouts in Penthouse and Hustler.

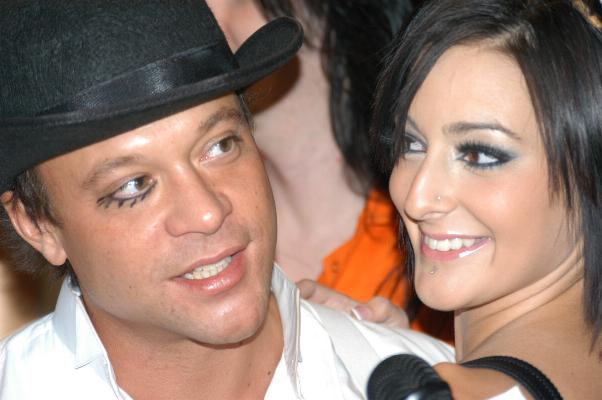
Lockwood & Presley Maddox at a 2006 Halloween Party

In 2005, Sex-Z Pictures offered Lockwood the directing reins, as well as the lead, in his first full-length feature The Decline of Western Civilization, Part 69: The Porno Years, which was an homage to one of Penelope Spheeris' classic rock/metal documentaries, The Decline of Western Civilization II.

In addition to his many scenes in other adult movies, Lockwood has continued to direct features for Bo Kenney and Sex-Z Pictures. He took the helm with such titles as L.A. Vice, a takeoff on the 1980s television series Miami Vice, as well as Lords of Doggie Style Town, Thumbsuckers, Teen Cock Rockers 2, and The Real Boogie Nights, a parody of the 1997 film Boogie Nights, with Kurt assuming the "Dirk Diggler" role.

In 2007, Lockwood retired from the porn industry and moved to Spain to be with his expecting girlfriend. However, he briefly returned to the industry in 2008 and performed in bisexual and transsexual scenes.

In 2012, Lockwood returned to Los Angeles to resume his adult film career. In 2013, Lockwood tried his hand in stand-up comedy.

=== Music ===
In 2005, Lockwood organized a benefit performance by his band for the Adult Industry Medical Health Care Foundation Detox Bed Program, which was held at the Whisky a Go Go in Hollywood and which raised $5000 to help adult industry performers who couldn't afford drug rehab treatment on their own. Lockwood sings and plays guitar for his original punk/rock band Porn City Punx.

== Awards ==
- 2004 AVN Award – Best Couples Scene, Film (Compulsion) with Ashley Long
- 2004 Adam Film World Guide Award – Best Actor, Film (Compulsion - Elegant Angel)
- 2005 AVN Award – Best Threeway Sex Scene, Video (Stories: Lovers & Cheaters) with Dani Woodward & Barrett Blade
- 2007 AVN Award – Best Supporting Actor, Film (To Die For)
