= MS Oscar Wilde =

MS Oscar Wilde may refer to the following ships operated by Irish Ferries:

- MS Oscar Wilde (2007), in service 2007–2019
- MS James Joyce, in service 2023–2024
- MS Oscar Wilde (2010), entered service in 2024

== See also ==
- Oscar Wilde (disambiguation)
