= Wilde Oscar =

Adult film actor (born 1967)

- Born: 8 April 1967 (age 59); Burnham, Buckinghamshire, England
- Other names: Wylde Oscar, Chris Sterling, Chris Oscar, Adam Knight
- Height: 5 ft 8 in (1.73 m)

Wilde Oscar (born 8 April 1967) is an English retired pornographic film actor. He is noted for being married to, and frequently performing with, the English pornographic film actress, Nici Sterling.

== Quotes ==
As quoted in The Independent newspaper in June 2000.

Although I have done films with Nici and in my own right, Nici's the star in the family. She's the one the directors are keen on. For a long while the fact that we were a married couple was a great selling point. There aren't many in this industry and those who work together on screen are rarer still.

== Awards ==
- 1998 AVN Award – Best Supporting Actor (Film) – Doin' the Ritz
- 2001 AVN Award – Best Supporting Actor (Video) – West Side

== See also ==
- List of British pornographic actors
