= Marriage 2.0 =

- Directed by: Paul Deeb
- Written by: Magnus Sullivan
- Produced by: Magnus Sullivan
- Starring: India Summer
- Cinematography: Alex Ladd
- Music by: Paul Deeb
- Release date: January 14, 2015
- Country: United States
- Language: English

Marriage 2.0 (also known as Marriage 2.0: A Modern Love Story) is a 2015 adult romance film depicting the first steps of a married couple into an open relationship. It was written and produced by Magnus Sullivan and directed by Paul Deeb.

Although the original version contains explicit sex scenes, the edited version received an NC-17 rating by the Motion Picture Association of America (MPAA). Author Christopher Ryan and sexologists Emily Morse, Reid Mihalko and Carol Queen appear in the film in brief cameos.

== Cast ==
- India Summer as India
- Ryan Driller as Eric
- Nina Hartley as India's Mother
- Dylan Ryan as Kara
- Sadie Lune as Meghan

== Release ==
Marriage 2.0 had its public theatrical premiere on May 2, 2015. On May 19, 2015, it was screened at the University of California, Santa Barbara as part of their Film and Media Studies course.

== Reception ==
British writer Gareth May, in an article for the British lifestyle and culture site TheDebrief, described the film as "a potential game changer for the porn industry." Salon's writer Tracy Clark-Flory wrote "it’s a far more attractive and better-acted porn film than most. But it’s the focus on incorporating the explicit sex scenes into a well-developed narrative that really makes it stand out." The un-rated version of the film received the Best Narrative award at New York's 2015 CineKink Film Festival, and was awarded Movie of the Year at the 2015 Feminist Porn Awards.
