= Yasmeena Ali =

British-Afghan pornographic actress

- Born: Khadija Patman; 1 December 1993 (age 32); Kabul, Afghanistan
- Occupation: Pornographic actress
- Spouse: David Cohen

Khadija Cohen (née Patman), better known as Yasmeena Ali (Dari: ياسمينه علی), is a British-Afghan pornographic actress.

== Biography ==
Cohen was born Khadija Patman on 1 December 1993 in Kabul, Afghanistan to an Afghan (Pashtun household).

Then, her family became supportive of the Taliban. When she was seven years old, following the United States invasion of Afghanistan (2001), she moved with her family to England. Yasmina attended college and attained a social work degree. Her parents raised her as Muslim, but Ali herself was not religious. At the age of 19, she dated a Jewish boy, which caused controversy within her family, followed by her family ejecting her from the family home and breaking off contact with her.

Cohen launched her career when she met pornographic director David Cohen, whom she later married. She formally converted to Judaism, her husband's religion, but later declare herself an atheist. The two previously lived in Austria and moved to Slovakia in 2017. Cohen became embroiled in a criminal case in 2020 when her father and his cousin were arrested for plotting to murder her because she had left Islam and had "disgraced the family" with her choice of career. The British National Crime Agency stated that the two took several trips to Slovakia in 2018 in order to search for her, and that a hitman offered to kill her for $70,000.

Cohen now advocates for women's rights and "condemns liberal activists who turn a blind eye to the violation of these rights".
