= Tony Tedeschi =

American pornographic film actor

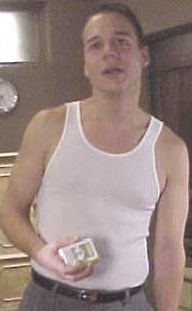
- Tedeschi in 2002
- Born: April 11, 1964 (age 62); Providence, Rhode Island
- Other names: Toni Tedeschi, Bryan Cobb, Tommy T., Peter Piper, Tony T., Tony Tedeshi, Tony Tandori, Tony T, Tony Salumeri, Tony Tandoori
- Height: 5 ft 10 in (1.78 m)

Tony Tedeschi (born April 11, 1964) is an American pornographic film actor and AVN Hall of Fame inductee.

== Career ==
Before his pornography career, he worked as a deejay at the Foxy Lady strip club in Providence. He was spotted by Britt Morgan, who was performing there at the time, and later shot his first scenes with her in 1990.

Tedeschi has appeared in nearly 1,300 films between 1990 and 2012, and co-directed one, Late Night Sessions With Tony Tedeschi, with Bud Lee, in 2004. He has worked for companies such as Adam & Eve, Anabolic, Caballero Home Video, Coast to Coast, Dreamland Video, Elegant Angel, Evil Angel, Heatwave, Hustler Video, Kickass Pictures, Legend Video, Leisure Time Entertainment and many others.

== Appearances ==
He appeared in the 1997 Paul Thomas Anderson film Boogie Nights. He was also a contestant on Win Ben Stein's Money (taped in December 2000, aired in April 2001).

== Recognition ==
In 2003, Tedeschi was inducted into the AVN Hall of Fame.

== Awards ==
Tedeschi has won a number of AVN Awards:

- 1993 Best Supporting Actor - Video for Smeers
- 1997 Best Supporting Actor - Video for Silver Screen Confidential
- 1997 Best Supporting Actor - Film for The Show
- 1997 Best Group Sex Scene - Film with Christy Canyon, Vince Vouyer, and Steven St. Croix for The Show
- 1999 Best Anal Sex Scene - Film with Chloe, and Steve Hatcher for The Kiss

== Personal life ==
He was married to fellow porn star Tina Tyler from 1993 to 1994.

== See also ==
- Peter North
- Randy Spears
