= India Summer =

American pornographic film actress and nude model

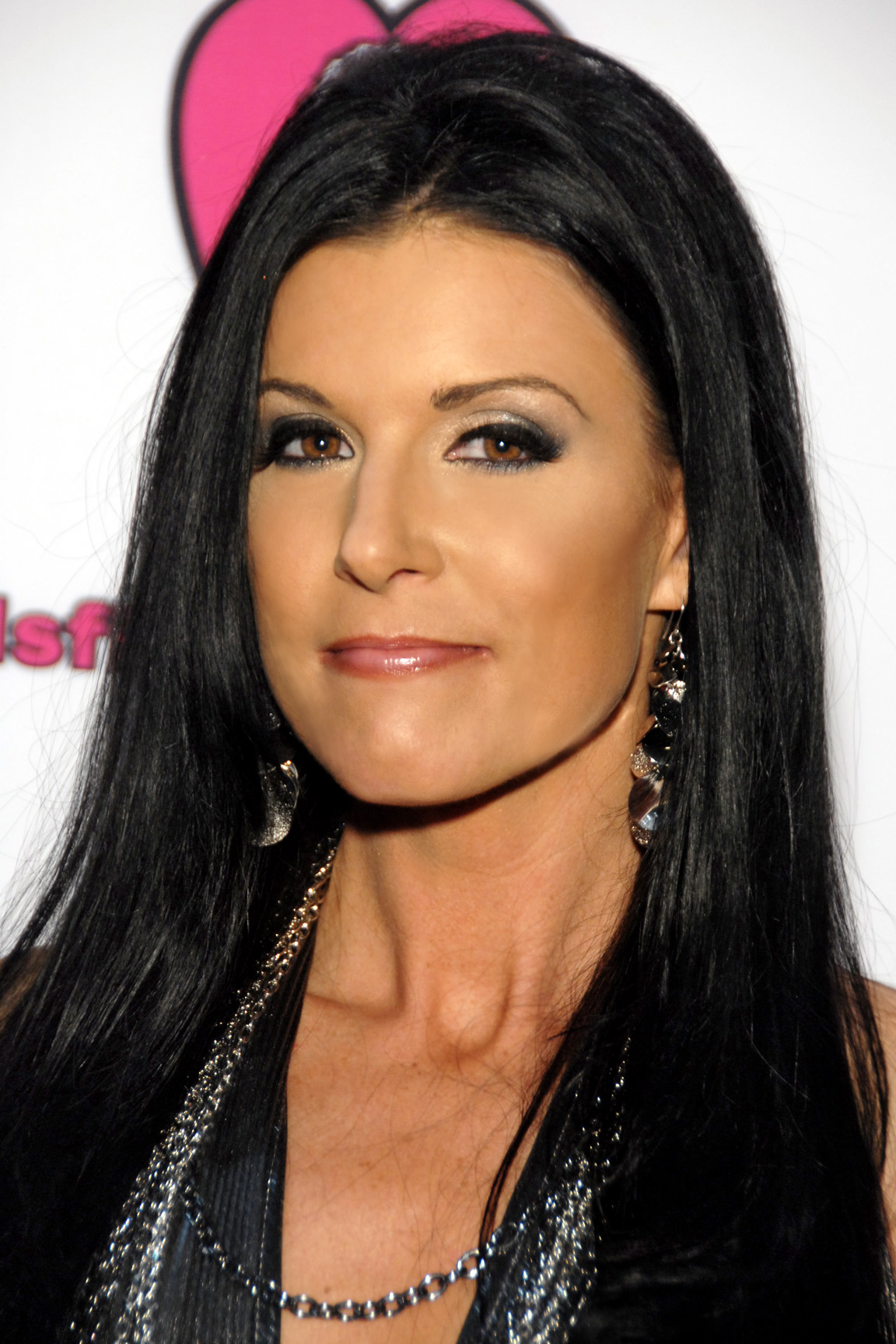
- Summer in 2011
- Occupations: Adult film actress; director; model
- Years active: 2005–present

India Summer is an American pornographic film actress and nude model and a member of the AVN and XRCO Halls of Fame. Her stage name is based on the phrase Indian summer. She also has mainstream acting credits.

== Career ==
Summer studied towards becoming a teacher. She then worked in finance for six years before moving to modeling and acting. Summer began working in the adult film industry at the age of 29.

In July 2009, she signed an exclusive girl on girl contract with Girlfriends Films studios.

In November 2011, her debut as a director was announced with the movie Perfect Fit.

=== Mainstream appearances ===
Summer has appeared in small roles in the television series Reno 911!, Sons of Anarchy, and Dexter. She also appeared in National Lampoon's 2007 film Homo Erectus.

In 2015, Summer had a starring role in the independent film Marriage 2.0. Although the original version contains explicit sex scenes, the edited version received an NC-17 rating by the Motion Picture Association of America. British writer Gareth May, in an article for the British lifestyle and culture site TheDebrief.co.uk, described the film as "a potential game changer for the porn industry. There are some great performances in the movie. India Summer especially excels, and Nina Hartley's brief role shows she clearly has comedic timing and talent." The unrated version of the film received the Best Narrative award at New York's 2015 CineKink Film Festival.

== Awards ==
Year	Ceremony	Award	Work	Refs.
2011	AVN Award	Best Actress	An Open Invitation: A Real Swinger's Party in San Francisco (2010)	
2012	AVN Award	MILF Performer of the Year	—N/a	
2012	XBIZ Award	MILF Performer of the Year	—N/a	
2012	XRCO Award	MILF Performer of the Year	—N/a	
2012	XRCO Award	Unsung Siren	—N/a	
2014	AVN Award	MILF Performer of the Year	—N/a	
2015	XCritic Award	Best MILF	—N/a	
2015	AVN Award	MILF Performer of the Year	—N/a	
2015	XRCO Award	MILF Performer of the Year	—N/a	
2016	XBIZ Award	Best Actress – Feature Release	Marriage 2.0 (2015)	
2016	XBIZ Award	Best Sex Scene – Feature Release	Marriage 2.0 (2015)	
2019	AVN Award	Hall of Fame	—N/a	
2021	AVN Award	Best Group Sex Scene	Climax (2019)	
2021	XRCO Award	Hall of Fame	—N/a	
