= Torbe =

Spanish pornographic actor, film director and producer

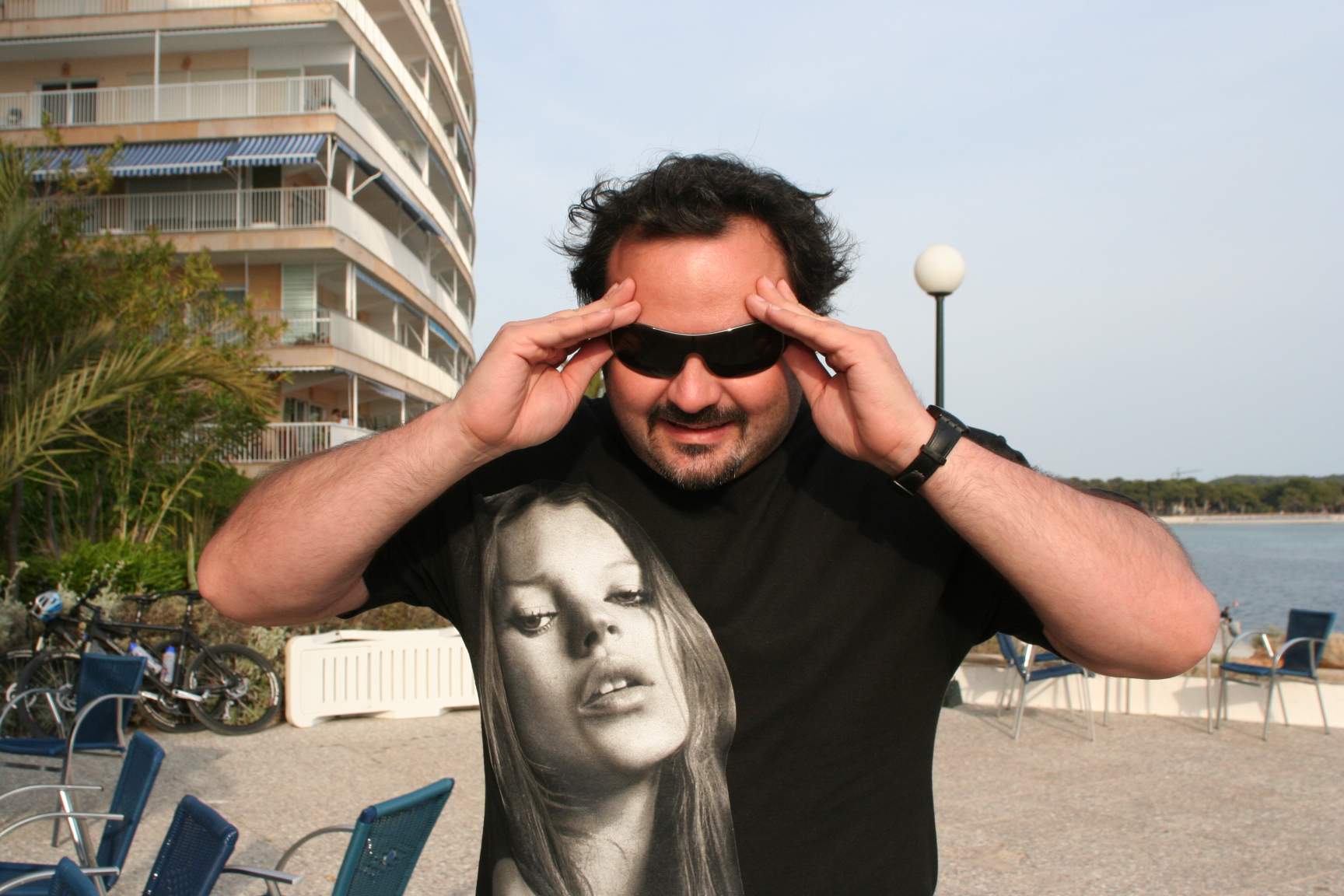
- Born: Ignacio Allende Fernández; 1969 (age 56–57); Portugalete, Spain
- Years active: 1996–present

Ignacio Allende Fernández (born 1969), better known as Torbe, is a Spanish actor, director, producer, and businessman in the online porn industry.

== Early life ==
Ignacio Allende Fernández was born on 25 May 1969, in Portugalete, Spain, in the Basque region. After finishing school at the Munabe school of Opus Dei in Loiu, Biscay, he worked as radio DJ in local radio stations. In the early 1990s, he worked as a cartoonist in the animated film The Legend of the North Wind, credited as "Nacho Allende." He also published his comics in magazines and comics fanzines. In the summertime, he worked as an event organizer in various hotels and nightclubs in the area.

== Porn ==
Torbe started the internet porn page Torbellinesca in 1996, creating the Torbe persona, and in 1999 established the domain name putalocura.com ("fucking madness"), which became highly successful. The site also features performers from Latin America. He personally participated as an actor in numerous porn videos, and in approximately twenty porn films as director and actor.

In 2005, Torbe was nominated in the Best Supporting Actor category in the AVN competition of the porn industry.

== Music ==
In July 2014, Torbe released a single titled "Soy un rumano en Madrid" ("I'm a Romanian in Madrid") accompanied by a video clip. The Federation of Romanian Associations in Europe protested on account of lyrics in the song such as "If I steal your wallet/Or remove all the copper/Don't get angry/I just want to have fun," calling it "racist and xenophobic." They claimed the song and clip encourage the notion that "the community of Romanians in Spain is made up of prostitutes, thieves and pickpockets."

== Mainstream cinema ==
Torbe's success in porn led him to be cast in mainstream films. He was featured in Spanish director Santiago Segura's Torrente 2: Misión en Marbella (2001) and Torrente 3: El protector (2005). In 2014, Torbe appeared as himself in the Jaime Rosales-directed, 2014 film Beautiful Youth and collaborated in the set up of some scenes.

== Controversial views ==
In 2016, Torbe, on his Twitter account, characterized the feminist movement as "pathetic." He also wrote on his blog that the movement is "full of butch lesbians, hipsters, chicks who hate men and crazies who get their tits out.”

== Legal issues: arrests & convictions ==
In 2006, Torbe was accused of shooting a porn video that featured an underage, 17-year-old girl. Two days later, he was released without being charged.

In 2012, Torbe was convicted and sentenced to one year in prison for defrauding callers in a television quiz show.

On 27 April 2016, Torbe was arrested and charged with abusing underage girls, selling child pornography, and engaging in sex trafficking. In June of the same year, the investigation expanded into allegations of tax evasion and forcing young women into prostitution. He was jailed and then released under parole in November 2016. The charges of sex trafficking were dismissed in June 2018. The charges of selling underage pornography are still being investigated.

In 2023, Torbe pleaded guilty to the charges of possession and distribution of child pornography. He was accused of recording pornographic images with two underage girls, storing them, and then disseminating them. The prosecution had proposed a prison sentence of 7 years and 7 months.

== See also ==
- 9 to 5: Days in Porn, documentary on the porn industry
