= 42nd AVN Awards =

US adult industry award ceremony in 2025

- Presented by: MyFreeCams
- Date: January 25, 2025
- Site: Virgin Hotels Las Vegas
- Hosted by: Blake Blossom and Alex Knight

Highlights
- Best Film: Gold Diggers

The 42nd AVN Awards was a pornography awards ceremony recognizing the best actresses, actors, directors, and films in the adult industry in 2024. The 42nd edition of the ceremony, which began in 1984, encompassed 98 categories involving content creation, production, retail and web/tech forums in the adult industry. The ceremony was held at The Theater at Virgin Hotels Las Vegas on January 25, 2025, as part of the AVN Adult Entertainment Expo, and streamed on Adult Video News' AVN.com.

== Winners and nominees ==
The nominees were announced at the AVN Awards Nominations Party held at Avalon nightclub and was co-hosted by Blake Blossom and Alex Knight. The winners were announced during the awards ceremony on January 25, 2025.

=== Major awards ===
Winners of these categories are highlighted in boldface.

| **Female Performer of the Year**: **Anna Claire Clouds**; Vanna Bardot; Blake Blossom; Jewelz Blu; Nicole Doshi; Liz Jordan; Cherry Kiss; Kira Noir; Octavia Red; Willow Ryder; Angela White; Angel Youngs | **Male Performer of the Year**: **Vince Karter**; Mick Blue; Nathan Bronson; Hollywood Cash; Dan Damage; Charles Dera; Seth Gamble; JMac; Ricky Johnson; Alex Jones; Vince Karter; Isiah Maxwell; Scott Nails; Milan Ponjevic; Codey Steele; Zac Wild |
| **Best Actress**: **Casey Calvert – Birth, Adult Time**; Lily Bell – Last Splash, Erika Lust; Blake Blossom – Iris, Wicked/Pulse; Cherie DeVille – Project X, Digital Playground; Reagan Foxx – Let Me In, Pure Taboo/Adult Time; Nicole Kitt – Dirty Cops, Digital Playground; Adria Rae – Gold Diggers, Digital Playground/Pulse; Lumi Ray – Amuse Bouche, Dorcel/Pulse; Victoria Voxxx – Alive, Dorcel; Maitland Ward – American MILF, MILFY | **Best Actor**: **Chad Alva – Alive, Dorcel**; Robby Apples – So Extra!, Wicked/Pulse; Nathan Bronson – Amuse Bouche, Dorcel/Pulse; Danny D – Scandalous, Digital Playground/Pulse; Charles Dera – Iris, Wicked/Pulse; Seth Gamble – Birth, Adult Time; Alex Jones – Sweethearts, Digital Playground/Pulse; Ryan Mclane – Side Hustle, Sweet Sinner/Mile High/Pulse; Scott Nails – Gold Diggers, Digital Playground/Pulse; Cody Steele – My Best Friend's Girl 2, Sweet Sinner/Mile High |
| **Best Actress - Featurette**: **Maitland Ward – Pigeonholed, Deeper/Pulse**; Jewelz Blu – Broken Butterfly: The Perfect Shade of Blu, Holly Randall Productions; Anna Claire Clouds – Abandoned, Pure Taboo/Adult Time/Pulse; Madi Collins – Back Rent: Paid in Rear, Sex and Submission/Kink; Kenna James – Who Rescued Who? IV, AllHerLuv; Nicole Kitt – Sultry Singer Nicole Seduces Her Longtime Crush, Vixen; Katie Kush – Saving the Family Business, Pure Taboo/Adult Time; Melody Marks – Mi Casa Es Su Casa, Pure Taboo/Adult Time/Pulse; Alison Rey – For Richer or Poorer, Pure Taboo/Adult Time; Dana Vespoli – Swapped in Secret: The Other Family, Pure Taboo/Adult Time | **Best Actor - Featurette**: **Seth Gamble – A Loving Home Environment, Pure Taboo/Adult Time/Pulse**; Parker Ambrose – My Virginity Is a Burden VII, MissaX; Nathan Bronson – Parkour XXX, ForPlay Films; Elias Cash – Coach Driller, MissaX; Hollywood Cash – Preserving Our New Lifestyle, Pure Taboo/Adult Time; Christian Clay – Sunset Serendipity, Sensual-X/Sssh; Ryan Driller – Coach Driller, MissaX; Ken Feels – A Lie of Omission, Pure Taboo/Adult Time; Seth Gamble – A Loving Home Environment, Pure Taboo/Adult Time/Pulse; Tommy Pistol – Don't Disrespect the Boss, Sex and Submission/Kink; Chad White – Watching Porn With Aubree, MissaX |
| **Grand Reel**: **Gold Diggers, Digital Playground/Pulse**; Alive, Dorcel; Amuse Bouche, Dorcel/Pulse; Birth, Adult Time; Iris, Wicked/Pulse; Juicy Silver, Digital Playground/Pulse; Last Splash, Erika Lust; Project X, Digital Playground; So Extra!, Wicked/Pulse; Ulterior Motives, Adam & Eve Pictures | **Best Featurette**: **Broken Butterfly: The Perfect Shade of Blu, Holly Randall Productions**; Abandonded – Pure Taboo/Adult Time/Pulse; Coach Driller – MissaX; Ghostbusters XXX: A Porn Parody – Cosplayground; Gorgons & Goddesses – Ten15Group; A Loving Home Environment – Pure Taboo/Adult Time/Pulse; Pigeonholed – Deeper/Pulse; The Prize: A Codi Vore Story – Pure Taboo/Adult Time/Pulse; Sunset Serendipity – Sensual-X/Sssh; Swarm – Wasteland Studios |
| **Best Supporting Actress**: **Chanel Camryn – Sunny Goldmelons, Wicked Pictures**; Monique Alexander – Project X, Digital Playground; Vicki Chase – Gold Diggers, Digital Playground/Pulse; Kimmy Granger – Gold Diggers, Digital Playground/Pulse; Selena Ivy – Last Splash, Erika Lust; Sophia Locke – Alive, Dorcel; Leana Lovings – Birth, Adult Time; Freya Parker – Spun, Girlsway/Adult Time; Shay Sights – Let Me In, Pure Taboo/Adult Time; Jennifer White – Dirty Cops, Digital Playground | **Best Supporting Actor**: **Nathan Bronson – Ulterior Motives, Adam & Eve Pictures**; Robby Apples – Sunny Goldmelons, Wicked Pictures; Xander Corvus – Evermore, Digital Playground/Pulse; Seth Gamble – So Extra!, Wicked/Pulse; Alex Jones – Gold Diggers, Digital Playground/Pulse; Scott Nails – Dirty Cops, Digital Playground; Ramón Nomar – Dysfunctional Family Values 2: Family First, Family Hookups/Metro; Tommy Pistol – So Extra!, Wicked/Pulse; Zac Wild – Sweethearts, Digital Playground/Pulse |
| **International Female Performer of the Year**: **Eve Sweet**; Amirah Adara; Little Caprice; Kelly Collins; Anna de Ville; Eden Ivy; Jadilica; Catherine Knight; Veronica Leal; Lia Lin; Clara Mia; Tiffany Tatum; Agatha Vega; Christy White; Zaawaadi | **International Male Performer of the Year**: **Christian Clay**; Alberto Blanco; Marcello Bravo; Jimmy Bud; Kristof Cale; Xander Corvus; Raul Costa; Danny D; Charlie Dean; Erik Everhard; Angelo Godshack; Tommy Gold; Matthew Meier; Jordi El Niño Polla; Alex Romero |
| **Best New Starlet**: **Gal Ritchie**; Brianna Arson; Dan Danger; Hayley Davies; Kelsey Kane; Khloe Kingsley; Raven Lane; Rissa May; Myra Moans; Sinatra Monroe; Millie Morgan; Jasmine Sherni; Addison Vodka; Madison Wilde; Angel Windell | **Transgender Performer of the Year**: **Brittney Kade**; Zariah Aura; Ariel Demure; Ember Fiera; Angellica Good; Gracie Jane; Kasey Kei; Leilani Li; Eva Maxim; Lola Morena; Eros Orisha; Amanda Riley; Emma Rose; Jade Venus; Izzy Wilde |
| **Director of the Year**: **Ricky Greenwood – Gold Diggers, Digital Playground/Pulse**; James Avalon – Ulterior Motives, Adam & Eve Pictures; Casey Calvert – Last Splash, Erika Lust; Danny D – Scandalous, Digital Playground/Pulse; Seth Gamble – Iris, Wicked/Pulse; Julia Grandi – Hotel Vixen Season 2, Vixen Media Group; Kayden Kross – American MILF, MILFY; Lea Lexis – Juicy SIlver, Digital Playground/Pulse; Bree Mills – Birth, Adult Time; Eddie Nova – Sunny Goldmelons, Wicked | **Best Editing**: **Compulsion 20th Anniversary Director's Cut – Elegant Angel; Axel Braun**; American MILF – MILFY; Duboko; Birth – Adult Time; Clit Eastwood; Broken Butterfly: The Perfect Shade of Blu – Holly Randall Productions; Jeffrey John Hart & Kyle McQueen; D.O.L.L.S. – Transfixed/Adult Time/Pulse; Michael Hues; Evermore – Digital Playground/Pulse; Papa Bitch, Steve McQueef, Jep Lamela & Colonel Cooch; The Orgasm Problem – Psychoporn; Yu Wang; Project X – Digital Playground; Papa Bitch, Boris Dongson & Mz Montage; Ulterior Motives – Adam & Eve Pictyres; James Avalon; We Can Build Her – Wicked/Pulse; Merlin L'emmancheur |
| **Best Cinematography**: **Dirty Cops – Digital Playground; Matt Holder**; Birth – Adult Time; Michael Vegas; The Budapest Affair – Sensual-X/Sssh; Dennis Claes; Casino Endgame – Dorcel/Pulse; Hervé Bodilis; Iris – Wicked/Pulse; J Wolf & Sammy Slater; Obscura – Lucidflix; Siren Obscura; The Orgasm Problem – Psychoporn; Yu Wang; Scandalous – Digital Playground/Pulse; Eric Shaun; Sweethearts – Digital Playground/Pulse; Lalo X; Ulterior Motives – Adam & Eve Pictures; James Avalon | **Best Music**: **Alive, Dorcel**; American MILF, MILFY; Birth, Adult Time; Broken Butterfly: The Perfect Shade of Blu, Holly Randall Productions; Gold Diggers, Digital Playground/Pulse; Last Splash, Erika Lust; Sultry Singer Nicole Seduces Her Longtime Crush, Vixen; Swarm, Wasteland Studios; Timeless, Wicked/Pulse |
