= 43rd AVN Awards =

US adult industry award ceremony in 2026

- Presented by: MyFreeCams
- Date: January 24, 2026
- Site: Virgin Hotels Las Vegas
- Hosted by: Abigaiil Morris and ItsLo

Highlights
- Best Film: Strip

The 43rd AVN Awards was a pornography awards ceremony recognizing the best actresses, actors, directors, and films in the adult industry in 2025. The 43rd edition of the ceremony, which began in 1984, encompassed 87 categories involving content creation, production, retail and web/tech forums in the adult industry. The ceremony was held at The Theater at Virgin Hotels Las Vegas on January 24, 2026, as part of the AVN Adult Entertainment Expo, and streamed on Adult Video News' AVN.com.

== Winners and nominees ==
The nominees were announced on November 21, 2025 and the winners were announced during the awards ceremony on January 24, 2026.

=== Major awards ===
Winners of these categories are highlighted in boldface.

=== Video ===
**Grand Reel**: **Strip** – Dorcel/Pulse; The Blueprint – Blacked/Pulse; Clout – Wicked/Pulse; Deadly Vows – Digital Playground; Hard Stop – Adult Time; Mind Games – Digital Playground/Pulse; Once Upon a Time in the Valley – Wicked Pictures; The Secrets We Share – Pure Taboo/Adult Time; Shared: A Hotwife Origin Story – Elegant Angel; Wanted – Digital Playground/Pulse	**Best Actor – Featurette**: **Tommy Pistol, “Mr. Sicko and the Little Lady”** – Sex and Submission/Kink; Parker Ambrose, “Wouldn’t Hurt a Fly” – Seductions V2, Deeper/Pulse; Dante Colle, “The Pitch” – Bellesa Films/BellesaPlus+; Charles Dera, “Not Again” – Pure Taboo/Adult Time; Ryan Driller, “Homeowners Association” – MissaX; Seth Gamble, “The Party's Over” – Pure Taboo/Adult Time/Pulse; Derek Kage, “Tune Up” – ForPlay Films; Ryan Mclane, “The Illusion” – Bellesa Films/BellesaPlus+; Michael Vegas, “Foot in the Door” – Pure Taboo/Adult Time; Chad White, “Made for Sex” – MissaX
**Best Actress – Featurette**: **Valentina Nappi, “Shamanologist”** – Hentaied.pro; Reagan Foxx, “Let Me in Too” – Pure Taboo//Adult Time/Pulse; Ivy Ireland, “Swamped” – Digital Playground; Nicole Kitt, “Tune Up” – ForPlay Films; Ashley Lane, “Manhood” – Under the Bed/Pure Taboo/Adult Time; Sophia Locke, “Mr. Sicko and the Little Lady” – Sex and Submission/Kink; Hazel Moore, “The Party's Over” – Pure Taboo/Adult Time/Pulse; Freya Parker, “Wouldn’t Hurt a Fly” – Seductions V2, Deeper/Pulse; Alison Rey, “Foot in the Door” – Pure Taboo/Adult Time; Shay Sights, “Let Me in Too” – Pure Taboo/Adult Time/Pulse	**Best Airtight/Gangbang Scene**: **“Hollywood Whore: A Jennifer White Showcase Film – Chapter 6 – Double Gangbang”** – Elegant Angel; Jennifer White, Vince Karter, Jax Slayher, Seth Gamble, Lexington Steele, Alex Jones, Hollywood Cash, Mannie Coco, Milan Ponjevic, Charles Dera, Victor Ray, Chocolate God, Slimpoke, Scotty P, Nade Nasty, Donny Sins, Damon Dice, Musa Phoenix, Derek Savage & Eddie Jaye; “Air Tight and Overloaded: Nicole Aria's Triple Invasion” – Jules Jordan Video; Nicole Aria, Mannie Coco, Milan Ponjevic & Donny Sins; “Charlotte Sins: First Gangbang” – Sex.com/Adult Time; Charlotte Sins, Milan Ponjevic, Derek Kage, Michael Vegas, Codey Steele, Victor Ray & Scotty P; “Chloe Amour’s Air Tight Invasion” – Jules Jordan Video; Chloe Amour, Chocolate God, Goldey & Slimpoke; “A Day in The Life of: Rebel Rhyder – Gang Bang” – Richard Mann’s World; Rebel Rhyder, Richard Mann, Musa Phoenix, Goldey, Jaxson Briggs & Kris K; “Emily Pink 5on1 First QUAD Double Fist” – Hardcore Gangbangs 4, Godshack/Evil Angel; Emily Pink, Nela Decker, Deny Lou, Liam Salvatore, Mark Dozer, Michael Fly & Thomas Lee; “MILF Quest – Episode 3” – Brazzers/Pulse; Cherie DeVille, Scott Nails, Goldey, Victor Ray, Spikey Dee & Derek Savage; “Summer Vixen Gaping & DP Gangbang” – Gangbang Sluts, Darkko/Evil Angel; Summer Vixen, Richard Mann, Rob Piper, Slimpoke, Hollywood Cash, Scott P & Musa Phoenix; “Trinity” – Deeper; Vanna Bardot, Dan Damage, Parker Ambrose & Dante Colle; “Yes Chief” – MILFs Need More, MILFY/Pulse; Eva Angelina, Dan Damage, Parker Ambrose, Hollywood Cash, Milan, Dante Cole & Sly Diggler
**Best All-Girl Group Sex Scene**: **“Performers of the Year 2025: Lesbian Orgy”** – Elegant Angel; Jennifer White, Anna Claire Clouds, Vanna Bardot, Blake Blossom, Lilly Bell, Octavia Red & Jewelz Blu; “Finally ... An All-Girl AAPI Orgy Extravaganza” – Girlsway/Adult Time; Kimmy Kimm, Lulu Chu, Avery Black, Alona Bloom, Marica Hase, Connie Perignon, Jasmine Teaa & Phoebe Kalib; “Girls Gone Sinner” – Roxie's Room, Ricky's Room; Roxie Sinner, Scarlett Alexis, Destiny Mira & Liz Jordan; “Keeping the Boss Happy” – LetsDoeIt; Charlotte Sins, Cami Strella & Gal Ritchie; “Pilates Gone Wrong” – Hot and Mean 39, Brazzers/Pulse; Gianna Dior, Kira Noir & Abigaiil Morris; “Pulled Out of the Closet” – Lez Be Bad/Adult Time; Jasmine Sherni, Aria Sloane & Little Dragon; “Slumber Party Dreams” – Girls Only Porn/Nubile Films; Kelsey Kane, Lexi Lore & Ophelia Fae; “Strip – Scene 1” – Dorcel; Jayden Cole, Riley Reid & Gizelle Blanco; “Taking It Further” – Girls Only Porn/Nubile Films; Emma Rosie, Eva Generosi, Melody Marks & Sawyer Cassidy; “The Third Wheel” – AllHerLuv; Aubree Valentine, Addison Vodka & Megan Mistakes	**Best All-Girl Movie or Series**: **Escape From Camp Conversion** – Girlcore/Adult Time/Pulse; Cravings 4 – Slayed/Pulse; A Girl Knows – LetsDoeIt; Girls Only Porn – Nubile Films; Lilly Loves Girls: A Gonzo Showcase Film – Elegant Angel; Massage Seductions 4 – Sweetheart/Mile High/Pulse; Prime Lesbian – AdultPrime; Sisterly Love 4 – Digital Sin Tabu Tales; Visions: Luna Luxxx – SkinVision/Alt Erotic; Women Seeking Women 198 – Girlfriends Films
**Best Anal Movie or Series**: **Anal Savages 11** – Jules Jordan Video; Anal Only – AnalOnly.com; Black Ass Anal Booty 6 – West Coast Productions; Gape for Days 5 – Evil Angel; Hardcore Anal Superstars 4 – Hard X/Mile High/Pulse; Invitation to Anal 2 – Lustery/Pulse; Oil Explosion 8 – Elegant Angel; P.O.V. Anal Sluts 2 – Darkko/Evil Angel; Rough Love 3 – Godshack/Evil Angel; Tushy Raw V72 – Tushy Raw/Pulse	**Best Anal Sex Scene**: **“Emma Rosie Anal Gaping & Pussy Squirt”** – Gape for Days 5, Evil Angel; Emma Rosie & Zac Wild; “Electric Anal” – Oil Explosion 8, Elegant Angel; Jesse Pony & Vince Karter; “Hard Stop – Scene 5” – Adult Time; Anna Claire Clouds & Seth Gamble; “Liz Jordan Anal Gaping & A2M Encounter” – Anal for Days 3, Evil Angel; Liz Jordan & Zac Wild; “No Such Thing as Too Deep” – LetsDoeIt; Ana Foxxx & Vince Karter; “Petite Hottie Gets Her Tight Ass Filled” – Tushy Raw V79, Tushy Raw/Pulse; Cheerleader Kait & Milan Ponjevic; “Rebel Rhyder Gapes and Prolapses After Getting Ass Fucked and Fisted” – PervCity; Rebel Rhyder & Milan Ponjevic; “Say Hello to My Little Arsehole” – Brazzers; Gal Ritchie & Ricky Johnson; “Teen Dream Rissa May Delivers Big Tit Energy and Her Ass for Deep Anal Pleasures” – Slut Puppies 18, Jules Jordan Video; Rissa May & Zac Wild; “Willow Gets an Anal Wild Ryde” – Hardcore Bombshells 3, Hard X/Mile High/Pulse; Willow Ryder & Zac Wild
**Best Anthology Movie or Series**: **Adventures of a Hotwife 6** – New Sensations; Doctor Adventures 18 – Brazzers/Pulse; FreeUse Fantasy – FreeUse/Reptyle; If It Feels Good 5 – Deeper/Pulse; Ink Motel 6 – Alt Erotic; Legends – Blacked/Pulse; Nerdy Girls (Series) – Elegant Angel; Parasited – Hentaied.pro; Unfaithful Betrayal 3 – Bellesa Films/Pulse; You Promised – Devil’s/Pulse	**Best Art Direction**: **Play** – Dorcel/Pulse; Clout – Wicked/Pulse; Deadly Vows – Digital Playground; Escape From Camp Conversion – Girlcore/Adult Time/Pulse; The Holdup – Digital Playground/Pulse; Mon Amour – Darkko/Evil Angel; Once Upon a Time in the Valley – Wicked Pictures; Transpirella – Gender X Films; Transtoinette – Aspen Kate Enterprises/Evil Angel; Wanted – Digital Playground/Pulse
**Best BDSM Movie or Series**: **Sex and Submission** – Kink; Brat Tamer – TeamSkeet/Reptyle; Choose to Lose Control – Sinful XXX/Pure Play; Cuckold Confessions – Winters Entertainment; Divine Bitches – Kink; Glenn King's Mean Bitches – MeanBitch/Evil Angel; Good Girl – Chelsea Poe Productions; He’s in Charge 6 – Digital Sin; Swapping Subs – Lez Be Bad/Adult Time/Pulse; Welcome to the Warehouse – Ripped Digital	**Best Blowbang Scene**: **“Guess That Cock”** – Brazzers; Blake Blossom; “Arabelle Raphael Blowbang, Boobs, Nut” – Sperm Diet 3, Darkko/Evil Angel; Arabelle Raphael; “Caged and Cum-Hungry: Abigaiil's Blowbang” – Brazzers; Abigaiil Morris; “Cats Eye: A Nicole Kitt Showcase Film – Chapter 3” – Elegant Angel; Nicole Kitt; “Jennifer White Junkyard Blowbang” – Wet Food 12, Darkko/Evil Angel; Jennifer White; “Kenna James Is Slutwoman – Chapter Two: On My Knees” – Elegant Angel; Kenna James; “Kylie Rocket Blowbang, Bukakke, Gulp” – Sperm Diet 3, Darkko/Evil Angel; Kylie Rocket; “Pizza Party Blowbang” – Brazzers; Angela White; “Roxie in Rotation” – Roxie's Room, Ricky's Room; Roxie Sinner; “Yumi Sin Gets Swarmed in a Six Man Blowbang” – Jules Jordan Video; Yumi Sin
**Best Boy/Girl Sex Scene**: **“Midnight Movie”** – If It Feels Good 5, Deeper/Pulse; Chanel Camryn & Milan Ponjevic; “Deadly Vows – Episode 1” – Digital Playground; Ryan Reid & Ricky Johnson; “Fuck Me Filthy, Please!” – Brazzers; Natalie Brooks & Vince Karter; “Hollywood Whore: A Jennifer White Showcase Film – Chapter 5 – Connections” – Elegant Angel; Jennifer White & Manuel Ferrara; “Naughty Cheater Has Secret Date” – Blacked Raw; Anna Claire Clouds & Damion Dayski; “Olivia Jay Takes Big Cock” – Black Beauties 5, All Black X/Mile High/Pulse; Olivia Jay & Isiah Maxwell; “Once Upon a Time in the Valley – Episode 5: Shadows of the Past” – Wicked Pictures; Gal Ritchie & Zac Wild; “Stars in Her Eyes” – Seductions, Deeper/Pulse; Lilly Bell & Parker Ambrose; “Wanted – Episode 1” – Digital Playground/Pulse; Blake Blossom & Parker Ambrose; “Xxlayna Marie Gets Wrecked by a Fat Cock” – Taken, Bang!; Xxlayna Marie & Vince Karter	**Best Cinematography**: **Strip** – Dorcel/Pulse; Matt Holder; Cheaters Anonymous – Elegant Angel; James Avalon; Escape From Camp Conversion – Girlcore/Adult Time/Pulse; Eli Cross & Michael Vegas; Exploration of Lust – Sensual-X/Sssh; Dennis Claes; Hard Stop – Adult Time; Siren Obscura & Sammy Slater; Long Con – Vixen Media Group/Pulse; Richie Blizzard; Mr. Nice – Xpervo/Little Caprice Dreams; Marcello Bravo; Pigalle – Dorcel/Pulse; Hervé Bodilis; The Red Door: An Octavia Red Showcase Film – Elegant Angel; Mad Creativity; Seductions – Deeper/Pulse; Set Walker
**Best Curve Appeal Movie or Series**: **Phat Ass for Days** – Evil Angel; Baby Got Boobs 34 – Brazzers/Pulse; Big Wet Asses 32 – Elegant Angel; Cheeky 17 – TeamSkeet/Reptyle; Flesh Hunter 16: Thick Edition – Jules Jordan Video; I Love My Hotwife’s Big Ass – New Sensations; My Busty & Bushy Girlfriend – Nubile Films; Racks 4 – Vixen/Pulse; Stacked 14 – Hard X/Mile High/Pulse; The Well-Rounded Girl – Deeper/Pulse	**Best Directing Portfolio – International**: **Julia Grandi**; Hervé Bodilis; Marcello Bravo; Roberto DiSuna; Angelo Godshack; Proxy Paige; Paulita Pappel; Rocco Siffredi; Franck Vicomte; Mark Zicha
**Best Directing Portfolio – Narrative**: **Ricky Greenwood**; Anatomik Media; Mad Creativity; Ike Diezel; Seth Gamble; Bree Mills; Craven Moorehead; Jay Rogue; W.C. Walker; Paul Woodcrest	**Best Directing Portfolio – Niche/Specialty**: **JohnPaul The Pope**; JD; Justin Kane; Charles Lyle; Sona Martini; Leigh Raven; Tristan Seagal; Sandra Shine; Joey Silvera; B. Skow
**Best Directing Portfolio – Non-Narrative**: **Jonni Darkko**; Maestro Claudio; Ricky Johnson; Jules Jordan; Vince Karter; KGB; Mason; Pat Myne; Chris Streams; Francesca Lé & Mark Wood	**Best Directing Portfolio – Varied Range**: **Derek Dozer**; Logan Xander & Kill Chris; Fumigalli; Ivan; Cherry Kiss; Sid Knox; Lea Lexis; Nate Liquor; Jim Powers; Mike Quasar; Wrex Oliver; Donnie Rock; Jacky St. James; Siouxsie Q & Michael Vegas; Inka Winter
**Best Double-Penetration Sex Scene**: **“Hollywood Whore: A Jennifer White Showcase Film – Chapter 1 – Lights, Camera, DP”** – Elegant Angel; Jennifer White, Seth Gamble & Vince Karter; “An Ass for Two” – Brazzers; Lily Lou, Mick Blue & Vince Karter; “Anal-Queen Cherry Kiss Gets Spit Roasted” – Tushy; Cherry Kiss, Dan Damage & Milan Ponjevic; “Blue-Haired Seductress Jewelz Blu Welcomes Two Dicks Into Her Throbbing Holes” – DP Diva; Jewelz Blu, Vince Karter & Milan Ponjevic; “Chanel Camryn's First Ever Double Vag and Double Anal Is So Fucking Hot” – Quiver Queen Chanel Camryn, Bang!; Chanel Camryn, Seth Gamble & Zac Wild; “Cheerleader Kait's First DP!” – DP Masters 10, Jules Jordan Video; Cheerleader Kait, Zac Wild & Jules Jordan; “Locked in a Nightmare” – Pure Taboo/Adult Time; Ember Snow, Seth Gamble & Vince Karter; “Mon Amour Scene 2 DAP” – Darkko/Evil Angel; Chloe Amour, Richard Mann & Rob Piper; “Sienna and Logan – Hubby Watches Wife Get Double Penetrated” – Wifey; Sienna Rae, Milan Ponjevic & Parker Ambrose; “Valerica Steele DVP & Squirt Threesome” – DVP Sluts, Darkko/Evil Angel; Valerica Steele, Hollywood Cash & Richard Mann	**Best DP/Mondo Movie or Series**: **Performers of the Year 2025** – Elegant Angel; Angels of Hardcore III – Godshack/Evil Angel; Double Penetration Fixation 5 – Darkko/Evil Angel; DP Fantasies 11 – Private; DP Masters 10 – Jules Jordan Video; Graduation Overload – Zero Tolerance/Pulse; Group Room – Ricky’s Room/Pulse; My DP 8 – Tushy/Pulse; Pl4y – Dorcel/Pulse; Rocco’s Sex Lessons: Italian Rookies – Rocco Siffredi/Evil Angel
**Best Editing**: **Deadly Vows** – Digital Playground; Mz Montage, Boris Dongson & Steve McQueef; Clout – Wicked/Pulse; Sammy Slater; Escape From Camp Conversion – Girlcore/Adult Time/Pulse; Pound Cake; Hollywood Whore: A Jennifer White Showcase Film – Elegant Angel; Evil Ricky; Mon Amour – Darkko/Evil Angel; Motion Fiction; Strip – Dorcel/Pulse; Bob le Flambeur; Transpirella – Gender X Films; Dewey Cummingside?; “Trinity” – Deeper; Jason H; Visions: Luna Luxxx – SkinVision/Alt Erotic; Deet; “Wouldn’t Hurt a Fly” – Seductions V2, Deeper/Pulse; Dick Hardpole	**Best Featurette**: **“Wouldn’t Hurt a Fly”** – Seductions V2, Deeper/Pulse; “The Birthday Slasher” – Digital Playground; “The Futa Parasited” – Parasited/Hentaied.pro; “Homeowners Association” – MissaX; “Let Me in Too” – Pure Taboo/Adult Time/Pulse; “The Party’s Over” – Pure Taboo/Adult Time/Pulse; “The Pitch” – Bellesa Films/BellesaPlus+; “Rest in Pieces” – Elegant Angel; “Swamped” – Digital Playground; “Tune Up” – ForPlay Films
**Best Female Mixed-Age Movie or Series**: **Moms Lick Teens 38** – Reality Kings/Pulse; Dad's Lesbian Lover 2 – Girlfriends Films; Do I Like Guys or Girls? – Devil’s/Pulse; Lesbian Babysitters 17 – Sweetheart/Mile High/Pulse; Lesbian Crush: MILFs Teach Teens – Hustler; Lesbian Daughter In-Laws 7 – Girlfriends Films; Moms Bang Teens 53 – Reality Kings/Pulse; Student Teacher Relations 2 – Sweetheart/Mile High/Pulse; Tricking Stepmom – Mommy’s Girl/Girlsway/Adult Time; Women Loving Girls 8 – The Lesbian Experience/Digital Sin	**Best Foursome/Orgy Scene**: **“Overload Act 3”** – Parasited/Hentaied.pro; Anna Claire Clouds, Myra Moans, Octavia Red, Scarlett Alexis & Ryan Driller; “The Bottom Floor: Second Coming” – Adult Time/Pulse; Little Puck, Sophia Locke, Casey Calvert, Alison Rey, Aiden Starr, Arson Leigh, Mickey Mod, Lilly Bell, Codi Vore, Coco Lovelock, Vanessa Vega, Ravyn Alexa, Leana Lovings, Penny Barber, Zariah Aura, Ember Fiera, Monique Miles, Tegan Trex, Connie Perignon, Codey Steele, Sherman Maus, Christian Wilde & Nicky Zeal; “Bratty Bitches” – Stars 8, Blacked/Pulse; Kendra Sunderland, Angel Youngs, Angie Faith, Isiah Maxwell, Hollywood Cash, Jax Slayher, Troy Francisco, Chocolate God & Sly Diggler; “Freya vs. Juniper: Soccer Swap Showdown” – Sis Swap/Swappz/Reptyle; Freya von Doom, Juniper Ren, Mike Ox & Giovanni Hollywood; “Let Me in Too” – Pure Taboo/Adult Time/Pulse; Sophia Locke, Lexi Luna, Reagan Foxx, Shay Sights & Tyler Cruise; “MILF Quest: Episode 1” – Brazzers/Pulse; Elizabeth Skyler, Alexis Fawx, Cherie DeVille, Nick Strokes, Derek Savage & Rico Hernandez; “MILF Trio Phoenix Rachael and Tanya Share” – Outnumbered, MILFY/Pulse; Phoenix Marie, Rachael Cavalli, Tanya Tate & Chocolate God; “Strip – Scene 5” – Dorcel; Clara Mia, Nicole Doshi, Nicole Vaunt, Blake Blossom, Seth Gamble & Isiah Maxwell; “Tempting Fate” – Reality Sis/Nubiles; Chanel Camryn, Molly Little, Sawyer Cassidy, Nathan Bronson & Ryan Driller; “An Unwrapped Holiday Orgy” – Ricky’s Room; Willow Ryder, Baby Gemini, Ameena Green, Nicole Kitt, Mani the Muse, Destiny Mira, Ricky Johnson, Isiah Maxwell, Chocolate God, Hollywood Cash, Mazee the Goat & Derek Savage
**Best Girl/Girl Sex Scene**: **“Domming Her Husband’s Side Piece”** – Hot and Mean 38, Brazzers/Pulse; Miss B Nasty & Kira Noir; “Arete” – Erika Lust; Victoria Voxxx & Charlee Chaste; “The Chance Encounter” – Bellesa Films/BellesaPlus+; Kylie Rocket & Sky Pierce; “The Club” – AllHerLuv; Melody Marks & Rissa May; “Deep Lesbian Desires – Scene 1” – Girlfriends Films; Alexa Chains & Summer Renee; “Gorgeous Redheads Have Intense Orgasms Scissoring” – Slayed; Matty Mila Perez & Scarlet Skies; “Lilly Loves Vanna” – Lilly Loves Girls: A Gonzo Showcase Film, Elegant Angel; Lilly Bell & Vanna Bardot; “Wetness” – SexArt/MetArt; Demi Hawks & Stella Luxx; “Wild Elevator Ride” – Lesbian X/XEmpire; Anna Claire Clouds & Chanel Camryn; “The Witcher XXX: A Porn Parody – Part 2” – Сosplayground; Chloe Amour & Gia OhMy	**Best Gonzo/Cinemacore Movie or Series**: **SuperprivateX** – Little Caprice Dreams; Amateur Allure – AmateurAllure.com; Ciao Bella – TeamSkeet/Reptyle; Enigma – LucidFlix; Follow Me – Dorcel/Pulse; Fuck Her Wet (Series) – Porn Pros; Hookup Hotshot: E-Girls 25 – Hotshot/Evil Angel; Superstar Room 4 – Ricky's Room/Pulse; Up Close (Series) – Adult Time/Pulse; What Do You Do for a Living? – Luxeplayhouse
**Best Hair & Makeup**: **Strip** – Dorcel/Pulse; Milla Van Damme, Raven Lux, Iggy, Lilith Manson & Alexxx Moon; Clash of the Vikings – Digital Playground; Liss Lacao; Clout – Wicked / Pulse; Lucy Rita; Deadly Vows – Digital Playground; Lexi Love, Olya, Lucy, Alexxx Moon & Mila Van Damme; “Enter Baldur’s Gate 3” – Little Puck's Playhouse; Mypetmonstergirl aka Rudy Campos; Escape From Camp Conversion – Girlcore/Adult Time/Pulse; Milla van Damme, Justin Hysteria, Raven Lux, Evlin & Lori Elle; “House of Silk” – Under the Bed/Pure Taboo/Adult Time; Bawdy by Gabe; “Lord Peckerclaw” – Horror Porn/Nudz; Nicole Caponne; “Manhood” – Under the Bed/Pure Taboo/Adult Time; Alexxx Moon; Transpirella – Gender X Films; Melissa Fae	**Best Indie/Amateur Movie or Series**: **Sexual Activity** – Dirty Cinema; Amateurs Caught on Cam (Series) – Net Video Girls/Pulse; Captured – The Flourish XXX; Please Hold: A XXX Parody – RayRayXXX/InMelanin; Queerly Yours – Lustery/Pulse; Sex Shop Sluts – Blazed Studios/Pulse; Shadows of Trust – Red Bottom Productions; Tad Pole Fucks Pretty Babes! (Series) – TadpoleXStudio/Pulse; That Fetish Girl – ThatFetishGirl.com; Two Is Always Better Than One – Horny Household
**Best Ingénue Movie or Series**: **Slut Puppies 18** – Jules Jordan Video; Cheating Sis – Nubiles; Her Best Friend’s Dad – Sweet Sinner/Mile High/Pulse; Lithe – Deeper/Pulse; Real Teens – Bang!; Seduce Your Dad Type (Series) – Porn Pros; Sis Loves Me – Family Strokes/Reptyle; StepTeens Fuck You Like Family – Hustler; Teens Love Huge Cocks 70 – Reality Kings/Pulse; Virgin Wishes – Zero Tolerance/Pulse	**Best International All-Girl Sex Scene**: **“Blood Donor”** – Vampired/Hentaied.pro; Matty Mila Perez & Nancy Ace; “Always Amirah Adara” – Concoxxxion/JHP Films; Amirah Adara, Tiffany Tatum & Rebecca Volpetti; “Dark Spark” – CharlieForde.com; Nova Hawthorne & Arcadia; “Drifting Together” – Caprice Divas/Little Caprice Dreams; Little Caprice & Sofi Vega; “Feeling Better” – Viv Thomas/MetArt; Norah Juliette & Sirena Milano; “Good Girls Go Bad” – EnjoyX; Angelique Lapiedra & Ada Lapiedra; “Irresistible” – Girls Only Porn/Nubile Films; Amber Slashh & Carolina Guerrero; “Soccer Fans Half-Time Orgy” – LetsDoeIt; Agatha Vega, Kama Oxi, Era Queen & Victoria June; “Tiny Cutie Is Obsessed With Eating Her Hot BFFs Pussy” – Lavish 6, Slayed/Pulse; Sonya Blaze & Ellie Luna; “Wet Side Story” – Benefit Monkey; Emily Pink & Fanta Sie
**Best International Anal Sex Scene**: **“Rocco's Perverted Secretaries 11 – Scene 5”** – Rocco Siffredi Productions; Rebel Rhyder & Raul Costa; “Anal-Hungry Baddie Gets Her Tight Ass Filled” – Blacked Raw; Amirah Adara & Mannie Coco; “Beautiful Tourist Gets Her Flawless Ass Filled” – Tushy; Nicole Kitt & Matthew Meier; “Blanca Nieves XXX” – Inka Productions; Vivian Lola & Pistolinha; “Contact 6 – Scene 4” – Dorcel/Pulse; Nelly Kent & Kristof Cale; “Feigned Job Offer” – Buttmuse/Little Caprice Dreams; Eva Generosi, Marcello Bravo & Matthew Meier; “Il Labirinto di Cnosso” – Pink'O; Martina Smeraldi, Freddy Gong & Darrel Deeps; “Monika Fox Dresses Her Salads by Squirting” – DP Fantasies 11, Private; Monika Fox, David Perry & Alex Romero; “Uncaged – Episode 2” – Digital Playground/Pulse; Angie Lynx & Danny D; “Worth the Game” – EnjoyX; Tiffany Tatum & Joe Di Marco	**Best International Boy/Girl Sex Scene**: **“The Boss”** – Mr. Nice, Xpervo/Little Caprice Dreams; Little Caprice & Marcello Bravo; “Fantasy Unlocked – Scene 2” – Sinful XXX; Anna de Ville & Francis X; “Influencer Blows Stranger” – Blacked Raw V92, Blacked Raw/Pulse; Hope Heaven & Troy Francisco; “Kelly Collins Burns for Her Filthy Cock King” – EnjoyX; Kelly Collins & Jimmy Bud; “Let's Get It On” – Ricky's Room; Baby Nicols & Ricky Johnson; “Perfect Babe Rae Can’t Resist” – Legends, Blacked/Pulse; Rae Lil Black & Jason Luv; “Pool Prankster Drowns in Ass” – Brazzers; Jasmine Sherni & Jordi El Nino Pollo; “Rocco's Gym Fit Ass Fuck – Scene 3” – Rocco Siffredi/Evil Angel; Barbie Rous & Aaron Rock; “Stepmom’s Kama Sutra Partner” – Moms Teach Sex/Nubiles; Veronica Leal & Raul Costa; “WeCumToYou: Love & Lust Episode 2 – Beyond Boundaries” – WeCumToYou/Little Caprice Dreams; Eve Sweet & Marcello Bravo
**Best International Group Sex Scene**: **“WeCumToYou: Love & Lust Episode 3”** – WeCumToYou/Little Caprice Dreams; Little Caprice, Eve Sweet, Marcello Bravo & Matthew Meier; “Angels of Hardcore III – Scene 5” – Godshack/Evil Angel; Nicole Love, Nicole Black, Mark Dozer, Thomas Lee, Liam Salvatore & Yanick Shaft; “Bulgarian MILF Diana Gabrovska’s Explosive MMF Threesome” – SugarBabes.tv; Diana Gabrovska, Mannie Coco & Romeo First; “Clash of the Vikings – Part 2” – Digital Playground; Amirah Adara, Catherine Knight & Xander Corvus; “European Playcation” – Group Room, Ricky’s Room/Pulse; Martina Smeraldi, Sara Retali, Maximo Garcia & Ricky Johnson; “From Dusk Till Orgasm” – EnjoyX; Tiffany Tatum, Matty Mila Perez & Juan Lucho; “The Orgy That Saved My Marriage” – An Orgy to Save My Marriage, Private; Angie Lynx, Eva Generosi, Sata Jones, Zazie Skymm, Juan Lucho, Leo Santos, Nikki Nuttz & Yeri Blue; “Pigalle – Scene 3” – Dorcel/Pulse; Gal Ritchie, Shalina Devine, Clara Mia, Lola Bellucci, Amirah Adara, Lullabyebye, Anita Rover, Nicole Rae, Ariana Cortez, Diana Lawrence, Malia Lenoir, Irina Kovalenko, Klem Rover, Luke Hardy, Ricky Rascal, Jimmy Bud & Matthew Meier; “Rocco’s Gym Fit Ass Fuck – Scene 1” – Rocco Siffredi/Evil Angel; Chloé Chevalier, Sara Diamante & Aaron Rock; “Young Married Woman Bai Jie – Episode 4: The True Lusty Newlywed Young Woman” – Model Media Asia; Li Rong Rong, Ai Xi, YanJiaYo & Mr. Chen	**Best International Picture**: **Ghosted** – Digital Playground/Pulse; After Dark – Dorcel/Pulse; Clash of the Vikings – Digital Playground; Crossing Borders 2 – Proxy Paige/Evil Angel; Exploration of Lust – Sensual-X/Sssh; In Vogue II – Vixen Media Group/Pulse; Long Con – Vixen Media Group/Pulse; Mr. Nice – Xpervo/Little Caprice Dreams; Pigalle – Dorcel/Pulse; WeCumToYou: Love & Lust – WeCumToYou/Little Caprice Dreams
**Best Leading Actor**: **Tommy Pistol** – Strip, Dorcel/Pulse; Parker Ambrose – Once Upon a Time in the Valley, Wicked Pictures; Robby Apples – Her Secret, Sweet Sinner/Mile High/Pulse; Xander Corvus – Mind Games, Digital Playground/Pulse; Oliver Davis – Simulation, Future Darkly/Pure Taboo/Adult Time/Pulse; Max Fills – The Secrets We Share, Pure Taboo/Adult Time; Seth Gamble – Breadcrumbs, Wicked/Pulse; Isiah Maxwell – Wanted, Digital Playground/Pulse; Ryan Mclane – Bucket List, Sweet Sinner/Mile High/Pulse; Scott Nails – The Holdup, Digital Playground/Pulse	**Best Leading Actress**: **Ryan Reid** – Deadly Vows, Digital Playground; Lilly Bell – The Secrets We Share, Adult Time; Blake Blossom – Wanted, Digital Playground/Pulse; Anna Claire Clouds – Clout, Wicked/Pulse; Reagan Foxx – Hard Stop, Adult Time; Sophia Locke – Mind Games, Digital Playground/Pulse; Lexi Luna – Breadcrumbs, Wicked/Pulse; Kira Noir – Payback’s a Bitch, Digital Playground/Pulse; Jasmine Sherni – Ghosted, Digital Playground/Pulse; Jennifer White – Once Upon a Time in the Valley, Wicked Pictures
**Best Male Newcomer**: **Axel Haze**; Brady Bud; Mannie Coco; Mighty Dee; Dickdealer Don; Goldey; Nelson Mandingo; Mike Ox; Leo Santos; Jason Sarcinelli	**Best MILF Movie or Series**: **MILF Performers of the Year 2025** – Elegant Angel; The Fucket List – Mommy's Boy/Adult Time/Pulse; Hot MILFs Wanted 3 – LeWood/Evil Angel; Learning Curves – Sweet Sinner/Mile High/Pulse; Legendary MILFs – MILFY/Pulse; MILF Quest – Brazzers/Pulse; MILFs at Home 2 – Private; MILFs Need More – MILFY/Pulse; Stepmom Sex Ed 9 – Nubiles/Pulse; To Die For – MYLF/Reptyle/New Sensations
**Best Multi-Partner Movie or Series**: **Three 4** – Deeper/Pulse; The Brazzers Podcast (Vol. 1) – Brazzers/Pulse; Jules Jordan’s Three Ways 3 – Jules Jordan Video; Luxure: My Wife’s Friends – Dorcel/Pulse; My Sister’s First Threesome 12 – Nubiles/Pulse; Rocco’s Sex Podcast: Martina vs. Eva – Rocco Siffredi/Evil Angel; Thr3e 6 – Dorcel/Pulse; Threesome Room 4 – Ricky's Room; Threesomes 5 – Blacked/Pulse; ZZ Unscripted: Threesome Edition – Brazzers/Pulse	**Best Music**: **Deadly Vows** – Digital Playground; Clout – Wicked/Pulse; “Duet” – Sexy Happy Couple/Sssh; Enigma – LucidFlix; Escape From Camp Conversion – Girlcore/Adult Time/Pulse; Hard Stop – Adult Time; The Holdup – Digital Playground/Pulse; Mon Amour – Darkko/Evil Angel; Wanted – Digital Playground/Pulse; “Wouldn’t Hurt a Fly” – Seductions V2, Deeper/Pulse
**Best New International Starlet**: **Eva Generosi**; Milan Cheek; Leya Desantis; Britney Dutch; Yasmina Khan; Megan Longoria; Mia Mi; Novella Night; Octokuro; Vixi Rafi; Audrey Reid; Layla Scarlett; Shelena; Polly Yangs; Alice Zaffyre	**Best New Production Brand/Banner**: **Wifey**; AR Porn; Billie-Sky.com; BrazzersVR; DreddXXX; Inka Productions; Luke Cooper X; Luxeplayhouse; Pervz; Ricky's Resort; Ripped Digital; SydneyScreams.xxx; Vampired; VenusRisingXXX; XXXTryout
**Best New Starlet**: **Cheerleader Kait**; Beca Barbie; Alexa Chains; Elly Clutch; Sage Hunter; Ivy Ireland; Asteria Jade; Linda Lan; Stella Luxx; Megan Mistakes; Gypsy Rose; Tessa Thomas; Cubbi Thompson; Violet Voss; Sky Wonderland	**Best Niche Movie or Series**: **Couture (Series)** – Dorcel/Pulse; BBWXXXAdventures – BBWXXXAdventures.com; Blush Erotica VR – BlushEroticaVR.com; Bush 12 – Elegant Angel; Evolved Fights Lez – EvolvedFightsLez.com; Family Squirts – Family Hookups/Metro/Pulse; Futanari – Hentaied.pro; LoveHerFeet – Love Her Films; One and Done – Woosh There It Is/Evil Angel; Perverse Family – Nudz
**Best Non-Sex Performance**: **Mike Horner** – Deadly Vows, Digital Playground; Chad Alva, “Not Again” – Pure Taboo/Adult Time; Ivan – Ink Motel 6, Alt Erotic; Olivia Jay – Hard Stop, Adult Time; David Lord – Bucket List, Sweet Sinner/Mile High/Pulse; Isiah Maxwell – The Blueprint, Blacked/Pulse; Texas Patti – The Last Resort, Digital Playground; Tommy Pistol – The Holdup, Digital Playground/Pulse; Daniel Shar – The Blueprint, Blacked/Pulse; Jane Wilde – Hard Stop, Adult Time	**Best Oral Movie or Series**: **Swallowed** – Swallowed.com; BJRaw – BJRaw.com; Gloryhole Secrets – GloryholeSecrets.com; Jawbreakerz – Jawbreakerz/Nookies; Mommy Blows Best – Blowpass; Only Teen Blowjobs – Blowpass; Sperm Diet 3 – Darkko/Evil Angel; Swallow Salon – SwallowSalon.com; Throat Fucks 9 – Darkko/Evil Angel; Throated – Blowpass
**Best Oral Sex Scene**: **“Wanted – Episode 3”** – Digital Playground/Pulse; Kylie Rocket & Isiah Maxwell; “A Big Cock for Molly Little” – This Girl Sucks/TeamSkeet/Reptyle; Molly Little & Ike Diezel; “Blake Blossom Dirty Blowjob” – Throated/Blowpass; Blake Blossom & Nade Nasty; “Charming Blowjob With Leana Lovings” – Blow VR; Leana Lovings & Jay Romero; “Edging Diva” – POVDreams/Little Caprice Dreams; Little Caprice & Marcello Bravo; “The Holdup – Episode 3” – Digital Playground/Pulse; Anna Claire Clouds & Scott Nails; “Nicole and Amari Take Turns” – Dirty Auditions 10, Dirty Auditions/Evil Angel; Nicole Kitt, Amari Anne & Mike Adriano; “Rissa and Luna Love It Down Their Throats” – Swallowed; Rissa May, Luna Luxe & Mike Adriano; “Sucking Cock Is My Favourite Activity” – Throated/Blowpass; Millie Morgan & Victor Ray; “Vanna Bardot Blowjob” – DarkkoTV; Vanna Bardot & Jonni Darkko	**Best Screenplay**: **Strip** – Dorcel/Pulse; Shawn Alff; Ghosted – Digital Playground/Pulse; Lotta B. Essen; Hard Stop – Adult Time; Bree Mills; Her Best Friend’s Dad – Sweet Sinner/Mile High/Pulse; Mike Quasar; Mind Games – Digital Playground/Pulse; Casey Calvert & Jon Drexler; Once Upon a Time in the Valley – Wicked Pictures; Seth Gamble & Melissa Monet; Payback’s a Bitch – Digital Playground/Pulse; Kelly Kay; Shared: A Hotwife Origin Story – Elegant Angel; Mad Creativity; Simulation – Future Darkly/Pure Taboo/Adult Time/Pulse; Maddy Burton; “Trinity” – Deeper; Kayden Kross
**Best Solo/Tease Performance**: **“The Secrets We Share – Scene 5”** – Pure Taboo/Adult Time; Lilly Bell; “Big Titty Threesome” – ZZ Unscripted: Threesome Edition, Brazzers/Pulse; Violet Myers & Kayley Gunner; “Entendre” – Enigma, LucidFlix; Melissa Stratton; “Hailey Rose Spit-Wet Cleavage Cramming” – POV Juggfuckers 8, Darkko/Evil Angel; Hailey Rose; “Hazel Grace: Reflections – Chapter 1: All by Myself” – West Coast Productions; Hazel Grace; “Hollywood Whore: A Jennifer White Showcase Film – Chapter 2 – Time to Myself” – Elegant Angel; Jennifer White; “Kenna James Is Slutwoman – Chapter Four: Me” – Elegant Angel; Kenna James; “Mon Amour Scene 3 Gangbang” – Darkko/Evil Angel; Chloe Amour; “Olivia Jay Takes Big Cock” – Black Beauties 5, All Black X/Mile High/Pulse; Olivia Jay; “Relentless Machine Fucking” – Fucking Machines/Kink; Chanel Camryn	**Best Star Showcase**: **Hollywood Whore: A Jennifer White Showcase Film** – Elegant Angel; Bang and Burn – Vixen/Pulse; Cats Eye: A Nicole Kitt Showcase Film – Elegant Angel; Dating – Dorcel/Pulse; Gemini's Room – Ricky's Room; Hazel Grace: Reflections – West Coast Productions; Jodi West Goes Gonzo: A Gonzo Showcase Film – Elegant Angel; Kenna James Is Slutwoman – Elegant Angel; Mon Amour – Darkko/Evil Angel; Natasha Nice: Busty Bombshell – Darkko/Evil Angel; Quiver Queen Chanel Camryn – Bang!; Rebel Meets Rebel – Rocco Siffredi/Evil Angel; The Red Door: An Octavia Red Showcase Film – Elegant Angel; Roxie's Room – Ricky's Room; Scarlet Anal Goddess – Secret Crush/Evil Angel
**Best Supporting Actor**: **Ken Feels** – Once Upon a Time in the Valley, Wicked Pictures; Nathan Bronson – Cheaters Anonymous, Elegant Angel; Danny D – Ghosted, Digital Playground/Pulse; Charles Dera – The Secrets We Share, Pure Taboo/Adult Time; Ryan Driller – Silver Linings, Elegant Angel/Adam & Eve; Seth Gamble – Bucket List, Sweet Sinner/Mile High/Pulse; Tommy Pistol – Play, Dorcel/Pulse; Victor Ray – Wanted, Digital Playground/Pulse; Codey Steele – Clout, Wicked/Pulse; Lexington Steele – Payback’s a Bitch, Digital Playground/Pulse	**Best Supporting Actress**: **Chloe Surreal** – Mind Games, Digital Playground/Pulse; Penny Barber – The Secrets We Share, Adult Time; Christy Canyon – The Holdup, Digital Playground/Pulse; Anna Claire Clouds – Hard Stop, Adult Time; Elly Clutch – Deadly Vows, Digital Playground; Charlie Forde – Escape From Camp Conversion, Girlcore/Adult Time/Pulse; Nicole Kitt – Play, Dorcel/Pulse; Sinatra Monroe – Once Upon a Time in the Valley, Wicked Pictures; Little Puck – Hard Stop, Adult Time; Codi Vore – Single Minded, Digital Playground/Pulse
**Best Tag-Team Sex Scene**: **“Petite Princess Xxlayna Marie Enjoys a Thrilling Threesome”** – Jules Jordan’s Three Ways 3, Jules Jordan Video; Xxlayna Marie, Zac Wild & Jules Jordan; “Big Natural 32G Vixen Hailey Rose’s Oiled Double Team Fuck Session” – Jules Jordan Video; Hailey Rose, Max Fills & Victor Ray; “Double Trouble – Decision 3” – Luxeplayhouse; Vanna Bardot, Codey Steele & Seth Gamble; “Down to Ride” – Brazzers; Kelsi Monroe, Lucas Frost & JMac; “Hard Stop – Scene 2” – Adult Time; Kenna James, Vince Karter & Nathan Bronson; “Hollywood Whore: A Jennifer White Showcase Film – Chapter 4 – The VIP Room” – Elegant Angel; Jennifer White, Zac Wild & Isiah Maxwell; “Hot Blonde MILF Gets Tag Teamed” – Summer MILF, MILFY/Pulse; Millie Morgan, Sheem & Hollywood Cash; “Once Upon a Time in the Valley – Episode 7: The Breaking Point” – Wicked Pictures; Ameena Green, Parker Ambrose & Ken Feels; “Rissa May's Thrilling Anal Threesome” – TagTeamPOV; Rissa May, Alex Mack & Mr. Lucky; “Visiting My Anal In-Laws 2 – Scene 3” – Devil's/Pulse; Anna Claire Clouds, Vince Karter & Will Pounder	**Best Three-Way Sex Scene**: **“Threesome Temptations”** – Jules Jordan Video; Kylie Rocket, Kiara Cole & Jules Jordan; “Bellesa House – Episode 240: Gal, Chanel and Zac” – BellesaPlus+; Gal Ritchie, Chanel Camryn & Zac Wild; “The Boss’s Daughter” – Nubile Films; Emma Rosie, Scarlett Alexis & Parker Ambrose; “Breaking Her Dry Spell” – Double Dip 2, Reality Kings/Pulse; Hailey Rose, Rissa May & Max Fills; “The Gangster – Decision 3” – Luxeplayhouse; Sinatra Monroe, Violet Starr & Seth Gamble; “Make ‘Em Squirt!” – ZZ Unscripted: Threesome Edition, Brazzers/Pulse; Kayley Gunner, Luna Star & Christian Clay; “Once Upon a Time in the Valley – Episode 2: Rising Stars” – Wicked Pictures; Jennifer White, Stella Luxx & Parker Ambrose; “The Red Door: An Octavia Red Showcase Film – Act 3 – Old Acquaintances” – Elegant Angel; Nicole Kitt, Octavia Red & Nathan Bronson; “Skeletons in His Closet” – Pure Taboo/Adult Time; Ameena Green, Destiny Mira & Mighty Dee; “The War for His Attention: Raven vs Summer” – Family Strokes/Reptyle; Summer Renee, Raven Lane & Donnie Rock
**Best Trans Acting Performance**: **Ariel Demure** – Transpirella, Gender X Films; Zariah Aura, “I'm the Fucking Boss!” – Kink Trans; Brittney Kade – Transtoinette, Aspen Kate Enterprises/Evil Angel; Aubrey Kate, “A Cab Named Desire” – TransAngels; Leilani Li – Double Timing Besties, TransAngels/Pulse; Blake Lovely – Once Upon a TS Summer, Grooby; Autumn Rain, “Teacher’s Pet” – Transfixed/Adult Time; Emma Rose, “Never Disappointed in That D!” – TransAngels; Jade Venus, “A Slumber Party of Their Own” – Transfixed/Adult Time; Cloudy Vi – Cloudy Vi Is the Bride, Grooby	**Best Trans Group Sex Scene**: **“Let Them Eat Cock”** – Transtoinette, Aspen Kate Enterprises/Evil Angel; Brittney Kade, Aubrey Kate, Angellica Good, Pierce Paris, Austin Rex, Sage Roux & Dom Cruise; “’Anonymous' Can Include Us, Right?” – Transfixed/Adult Time; Leilani Li, Zariah Aura & Jewelz Blu; “Cloudy's Wedding: A Happy Wife” – Cloudy Vi Is the Bride, Grooby; Cloudy Vi, Pierce Paris & Chris Epic; “Girls Night Gangbang” – TransAngels; Bailey Archer, Angellica Good, Rana Katana & Ethan Chase; “My First Trans Lover – Scene 2” – Gender X/Pulse; Crystal Thayer, Tori Easton & Raven Lane; “My Tattoo Girls 6: Trans Edition – Scene 4” – Amateur Productions/Alt Erotic; Madame Ouija, Autumn Rain, Avery Lust, Sarina Havok, Taylor Nicole, Nikki Zee & Robin Coffins; “The Party Crash” – Once Upon a TS Summer, Grooby; Blake Lovely, Jade Venus & Pierce Paris; “Throuple's Retreat” – Transfixed/Adult Time; Bella Jolie, Kasey Kei & Dom Cruise; “Trans Orgy” – Gender X/Pulse; Jade Venus, Ariel Demure, Brittney Kade, Kasey Kei, Tori Easton, Khloe Kay, Lola Morena, Cherry Kiss, Michael DelRay, Steve Rickz, Cliff Jensen & Wolf Hudson; “TS Aubrey Kate Gangbang/DAP Initiation” – Aubrey Kate’s Wet ‘n Wild, Aspen Kate Enterprises/Evil Angel; Aubrey Kate, Cliff Jensen, Pierce Paris, Michael Vegas, Cole Church, Austin Rex, Sage Roux & Silas Stone
**Best Trans Movie or Series**: **Transtoinette** – Aspen Kate Enterprises/Evil Angel; Alley Oopsie – Oopsie!/Adult Time/Pulse; Aubrey Kate's Wet ‘n Wild – Aspen Kate Enterprises/Evil Angel; Cloudy Vi Is the Bride – Grooby; Double Timing Besties – TransAngels/Pulse; Ink Motel 5.5: A Little Something Extra – Alt Erotic; Jade’s Got a Secret! 2 – TransAngels/Pulse; Once Upon a TS Summer – Grooby; Transpirella – Gender X Films; TS Girls Do It Best (Series) – TransSensual/Mile High/Pulse	**Best Trans Newcomer**: **Bella Joie**; Layla Babi; Chanel Chance; Eris Jolie; Cailey Katts; Emelia Lavoie; Gray Perrier; Kaela Luna; Mirage Desire; Scarlet Synn
**Best Trans One-on-One Sex Scene**: **“A Cab Named Desire”** – TransAngels; Aubrey Kate & Austin Rex; “A + A = Demure Lust” – TGirls.Porn/Grooby; Ariel Demure & Avery Lust; “Bella Joie & Victoria Grant TS-on-TS” – Aubrey Kate's Wet ‘n Wild, Aspen Kate Enterprises/Evil Angel; Bella Joie & Victoria Grant; “Creampies on the Mind” – Transfixed/Adult Time; Kasey Kei & Eva Maxim; “Double Timing Besties Part 3” – TransAngels/Pulse; Leilani Li & Lola Moreno; “Feeling Her Way” – Transfixed/Adult Time; Zariah Aura & Kenna James; “Pound Her TS Style” – TS Chronicles, TransSensual/Mile High/Pulse; Amanda Riley & Derek Kage; “Pretty Please Mistress” – Kink Trans; Emma Rose & Derek Kage; “The Secret Unwrapped” – Red Bottom Productions; Brittney Kade & Andre Stone; “TS Andylynn Payne Seduces Emma Rosie” – Trans-Active 32, Joey Silvera/Evil Angel; Andylynn Payne & Emma Rosie	**Best VR Group Sex Scene**: **“Legal Cast: The Movie”** – SexLikeReal; Eve Sweet, Agatha Vega & John Strong; “The Dark Side of Vanna Bardot and Little Dragon” – VR Bangers; Vanna Bardot, Little Dragon & Ryan Driller; “Here Cum the Brides” – POVR; Lana Smalls, Sweet Sophia & Oliver Davis; “Nymphololas” – VRSpy; Angel Windell, Melody Marks & John Strong; “Queens of the Moan Age” – BaDoinkVR; Octavia Red, Stella Luxx & Tommy Gunn; “Ripped Tights: CopyCats” – SexLikeReal; Kylie Rocket, Chanel Camryn, Cherry Kiss, Aria Valencia, Harley Haze & John Strong; “Spooky Midnight Challenge” – Virtual Real Porn; Demi Hawks, Myra Moans & Sage Roux; “Thriller XXX: Scared Stiff” – WankzVR; Hime Marie, Raven Lane, Selina Imai & Brad Sterling; “Topless Maids” – VR Bangers; Nina White, Anya Olsen & Clarke Kent; “Young, Wild & Three” – BaDoinkVR; Anna Claire Clouds, Savvy Suxx & Nathan Bronson
**Best VR One-on-One Sex Scene**: **“Lady Deadpool & Wolverine (A Porn Parody)”** – VR Conk; Blake Blossom & Nathan Bronson; “At Melanie’s Mercy” – BaDoinkVR; Melanie Marie & Ken Feels; “Attorney of Seduction” – SexLikeReal; Adriana Chechik & Ken Feels; “Budding Pussy Star” – RealJamVR; Asteria Jade & Sage Roux; “FUCK! I Don’t Know How You Made Your Huge Cock Fit in My Tight Pussy” – RealHotVR; Sky Wonderland & Brad Newman; “La Isla Bella” – BaDoinkVR; Isa Bella & Nathan Bronson; “Let’s Go for a Quickie Lia Lin” – Little Caprice Dreams; Lia Lin & Marcello Bravo; “Meet My Work Wife” – Watch You Cheat VR/Adult Time; Kylie Rocket & Gal Ritchie; “Panty Air Drop” – BaDoinkVR; Ellie Nova & Nathan Bronson; “Selena Squirts Massive Amounts of Cum” – Lethal Hardcore VR; Selena Ivy & Nick Strokes	**Best VR Trans Sex Scene**: **“The Boss! Aubrey Kate Domination”** – TS Virtual Lovers; Aubrey Kate & Sage Roux; “Author Notes” – VRB Trans; Nikolle Mayara & Henrique Miranda; “Autumn Rain Says ‘Please, Please Me...’” – GroobyVR; Autumn Rain & Sage Roux; “Avery Lust Is the Maid!” – GroobyVR; Avery Lust & Steve Rickz; “Hands Up, Pants Down” – VRB Trans; Grazyeli Silva & Henrique Miranda; “Labor of Lust” – Virtual Real Trans; Victoria Grant & Derek Kage; “Sensual Evening” – Virtual Real Trans; Leah Hayes & Sage Roux; “Straight to the Action!” – TransVR/Grooby; Nyxi Leon & Chris Epic; “Tight Ass for One Night Stand” – TS Virtual Lovers; Casey Kisses & Derek Kage; “Waking Up With Ariel!” – GroobyVR; Ariel Demure & Giovanni
**Clever Title of the Year**: **“Sittin’ on the Cock of the Day”** – WankzVR; “Bend Me Over Your Walker & Fuck Me, Pop-pop!” – Swappz/Reptyle; Clit Bait – Lethal Hardcore/Pulse; “Cock Me Amadeus” – WankzVR; Did You Order Rim Service? – Lethal Hardcore/Pulse; “Hole Alone” – Exxxtra Small/TeamSkeet/Reptyle; “How to Drain Your Dragon” – VR Bangers; “’I Can’t Believe We Spit-Roasted Nana!’ Grandparents’ Day Gets Weird” – PervNana/Family Strokes/Reptyle; “Jizz on Me, Private! — THAT’s An Order!” – Brazzers; Transtoinette – Aspen Kate Enterprises/Evil Angel	**Female Performer of the Year**: **Jennifer White**; Chloe Amour; Vanna Bardot; Lilly Bell; Blake Blossom; Chanel Camryn; Anna Claire Clouds; Liz Jordan; Cherry Kiss; Nicole Kitt; Rissa May; Octavia Red; Gal Ritchie; Kylie Rocket; Angela White
**International Female Performer of the Year**: **Eve Sweet**; Amirah Adara; Cherry Candle; Little Caprice; Alexis Crystal; Amalia Davis; Anna de Ville; Shalina Devine; Eden Ivy; Jadilica; Catherine Knight; Lia Lin; Matty Mila Perez; Martina Smeraldi; Tiffany Tatum	**International Male Performer of the Year**: **Marcello Bravo**; Alberto Blanco; Jimmy Bud; Kristof Cale; Xander Corvus; Raul Costa; Danny D; Charlie Dean; Darrell Deeps; Angelo Godshack; Juan Lucho; Matthew Meier; Jordi El Niño Polla; Dimitri Shadow; Yanick Shaft
**Male Performer of the Year**: **Vince Karter**; Parker Ambrose; Mick Blue; Hollywood Cash; Christian Clay; Charles Dera; Seth Gamble; Ricky Johnson; Jason Luv; Isiah Maxwell; Scott Nails; Milan Ponjevic; Victor Ray; Codey Steele; Zac Wild	**Mark Stone Award for Outstanding Comedy**: **Her Best Friend’s Dad** – Sweet Sinner/Mile High/Pulse; “Bend Me Over Your Walker & Fuck Me, Pop-pop!” – Swappz/Reptyle; The Holdup – Digital Playground/Pulse; Ink Motel 6 – Alt Erotic; Payback’s a Bitch – Digital Playground/Pulse; Play – Dorcel/Pulse; Please Hold: A XXX Parody – RayRayXXX/InMelanin; “Revenge of the Cuck” – Pure Taboo/Adult Time; “Take a Peep” – CharlieForde.com; Visiting My Anal In-Laws 2 – Devil’s/Pulse
**MILF Performer of the Year**: **Lexi Luna**; Penny Barber; Cory Chase; Cherie DeVille; Gigi Dior; Alexis Fawx; Charlie Forde; Reagan Foxx; Sophia Locke; Millie Morgan; Lauren Phillips; Little Puck; Shay Sights; Elizabeth Skylar; Taylor Vixxen	**Most Outrageous Sex Scene**: **“Shamanologist” (or “We Have Such Sights to Show You”)** – Hentaied.pro; Valentina Nappi; “Dick's Take Out” (or “Extra Sauce for My Weiner and a Hershey Shake for My Fries”) – Futa World/Adult Time; Siri Dahl, Casey Calvert & Electra Rayne; “Food Fight? Nah, Fucked Fight-Cocked Right” (or “Clusteryuck”) – Monster Cock Gang/Nudz; Claudia Mac, Neeo, Steve Q, Max Born, Endy Moore, Thomas Rhino & Ricky Rascal; “Going for Gold” (or “Take This GayVN Award and Shove It!”) – Divine Bitches/Kink; Leigh Raven & Derek Kage; “Lord Peckerclaw” (or “Birdman XXX: A Porn Apocalypse”) – Horror Porn/Nudz; Nicole Love, Madam Andrea & George Uhl; “Mrs. Horsecock Pt. 2” (or “Jizz Blast My Intestines and Call Me Wilbur”) – Futanari/Hentaied; Josephine Jackson & Veronica Leal; “Rebel Rhyder Lesbian, DP & DAP Orgy” (or “How Her Anus Got Nicknamed ‘The Sarlacc’”) – Rebel Meets Rebel, Rocco Siffredi/Evil Angel; Rebel Rhyder, Kelly Stafford, Lilly Mays, Little Maly, Nelson Mandingo, Freaky T & Jesus Reyes; “Robin Coffins Breaks in Tattoo Artist Madame Ouija Into Tattooing and Fucking!” (or “Girl Cock Can Distract Me From Anything”) – My Tattoo Girls 6 - Trans Edition, Amateur Productions/AltErotic; Madame Ouija & Robin Coffins; “Satanic Orgy and Hellish Takedown” (or “Lucifer’s Sploogenami”) – Transpirella, Gender X Films; Ariel Demure, Avery Lust, Andylynne Payne & Jack Hammer; “Ultimate Anal” (or “Pee-Pee for Your Bunghole”) – Brazzers; Gia Derza & Victor Ray
**Niche/Specialty Performer of the Year**: **Brittany Andrews**; Anuskatzz; Robin Coffins; Tina Lee Comet; Sally D’Angelo; Ophelia Fae; Kendra James; Cliff Jensen; Goddess Lilith; Tad Pole; Sage Roux; Serene Siren; Jadynn Stone; DD White; Christian Wilde	**Outstanding Directing – Individual Work**: **Deadly Vows** – Digital Playground; Ricky Greenwood; After Dark – Dorcel/Pulse; Liselle Bailey; The Blueprint – Blacked/Pulse; Derek Dozer; Connection – Dorcel/Pulse; Casey Calvert; Ghosted – Digital Playground/Pulse; Danny D; Hard Stop – Adult Time; Bree Mills; Hollywood Whore: A Jennifer White Showcase Film – Elegant Angel; Mike John; In Vogue II – Vixen Media Group/Pulse; Julia Grandi; The Last Resort – Digital Playground; Marvin Love; Once Upon a Time in the Valley – Wicked Pictures; Seth Gamble
**Trans Performer of the Year**: **Aubrey Kate**; Zariah Aura; Ariel Demure; Victoria Grant; Brittney Kade; Kasey Kei; Leilani Li; Blake Lovely; Avery Lust; Eva Maxim; Lola Morena; Andylynn Payne; Autumn Rain; Grazyeli Silva; Jade Venus

=== Pleasure Products ===
**Best Enhancement Manufacturer**: **Wicked Sensual Care**; Blissfull Creations; Body Action; Bum Chums Fibre Capsules; Kama Sutra; Killer Bee; Lovense; Micro Journey; MOR; pjur; Pop Star Labs; Sliquid; SOS Distribution; Thumper; Zuice for Men	**Best Fetish Manufacturer**: **Bad Dragon**; Adventure Industries; The Dungeon Store; The Kink Store; Kinky Play Box; Leather By Danny; Lust – Male Power/Magic Silk; Nox Labs; Rouge Group; Sado Toys; Sex Magnet Leather Pheromone; Sportsheets; TheKinkShop.com; XR Brands; XTC Japan
**Best Lingerie or Apparel Line**: **Fantasy Lingerie**; Baci Lingerie; Be Wicked Lingerie; Boyztown Collective; Coquette International Inc; Dreamgirl; Envy; Exposed; Kix'ies; Le Desir; Male Power; Mapale; Oh La La Cheri; Teacher’s Pet; Virtue	**Best Lubricant Brand**: **pjur**; Astroglide; Bare Self Care Collection; Bator Balm; Good Clean Love; Helmet Grease; Kama Sutra Divine Nectars; Non Friction / FuckWater; Sensuva; Sliquid; Slube; Tube Lube Semen Lube; Tussle; TYO Lubricant; Wicked Sensual Care
**Best Pleasure Product Manufacturer – Large**: **Evolved Novelties**; Bad Dragon; CalExotics; Doc Johnson; Fun Factory; Lovehoney Group; Nasstoys; Pretty Love; Satisfyer; Shots; Svakom; Tantaly; WOW Group; XGEN; XR Brands	**Best Pleasure Product Manufacturer – Medium**: **Motorbunny**; Aneros; b-Vive/Le Wand; Honey Play Box; Icon Brands; Kiiroo; Little Genie; Lovense; Maia Novelties; Nu Sensuelle; Oxballs; Seiraku Toys (OnaHole); Sportsheets; SVibe by Amoreo Erope S.L.; Wicked Sensual Care
**Best Pleasure Product Manufacturer – Small**: **Like a Kitten**; Blissfull Creations; Brazzers Toys; Cowgirl; Cute Little Fuckers; Doxy; The Dungeon Store; Kama Sutra; Luxus; Mr. Hankey’s; New York Toy Collective; Ocean Toys; OhMiBod; Perfect Fit Brand; Viben

=== Retail ===
**Best Boutique**: **Love Shack Lake Charles**; Aphrodisia Boutique; Early to Bed; Eve's Apple; Feelmore; Guilty Pleasures; Knock First; Let's Learn Love; Little Sisters Book & Art Emporium; Please; Pleasure Island; Rough Trade; Smitten Kitten; Tease; The Tool Shed	**Best Retail Chain – Large**: **Romantix**; Adam & Eve of the Carolinas; Adult World; Amazing Intimate Essentials; Castle Megastore; Cirilla's; Condom World; Deja Vu; Hustler Hollywood; Lion's Den; Love Store; Lover’s Lane; Sara’s Secret; Starship Enterprises; Sunset Novelties
**Best Retail Chain – Medium**: **Good Vibrations**; Cupids Lingerie; Dreamers; Enchantasys; Excitement Adult Stores; Fairvilla; Fantasy For Adults Only; Fantasy Gifts (Minnesota); Kalli's Love Stuff; London Boutique; LSMT; Patricia’s; Risque Moments; Romantic Depot; Romeo and Juliet's	**Best Retail Chain – Small**: **Cupid's Closet**; Condom Knowledge; Erotique Pink; Fantasy Gifts; GigglesWorld; In the Groove; Just For Pleasure; Love Store Mexico; Love Stuff and More; Nice & Naughty; Passions; Sexy Suz; SheBop; Tokyo Valentino; Wet Dreams Pty
**Best Web Retail Store**: **AdultEmpire.com**; AdamEve.com; Aneros.com; In.ImBesharam.com; BettysToyBox.com; BrazzersToys.com; CockblockToys.com; HustlerHollywood.com; IndigoHoney.com; PartiesbyBellas.com; PeepshowToys.com; SpectrumBoutique.com; Spicerack.Market; StagShop.com; TheKinkShop.com

=== Fan-Voted Winners ===
**Favorite Cam Girl**: **Skitty**	**Favorite Independent Female Creator**: **Mama Plugs**
**Favorite Female Porn Star**: **Angela White**	**Most Spectacular Boobs**: **Angela White**
**Hottest All-Girl Creator Collab**: **Mia Malkova** – Angela White & Riley Reid	**Hottest Boy/Girl Creator Collab**: **Angela White & Damion Dayski**
**Favorite Porn Star Creator**: **Adriana Chechik**	**Hottest New Creator**: **Comatozze**
**Favorite MILF Star**: **Cory Chase**	**Most Amazing Ass**: **Abella Danger**
**Favorite Independent Female Creator**: **Mama Plugs**	**Favorite Cosplayer**: **Violet Myers**
**Favorite Cam/Creator Couple**: **Hailey Rose & Max Fills**	**Hottest Group Creator Collab**: **Plug Talk Orgy**
**Hottest Studio Newcomer**: **Elly Clutch**	**Favorite Cam Girl**: **Skitty**
**Hottest Trans Creator Collab**: **Cheerleader Gangbang**	**Unsung Darling**: **Chloe Surreal**
**Favorite Domme**: **Evil Woman**	**Favorite Adult Podcast**: **Pillow Talk**
**Favorite BBW Star**: **Alex Blair**	**Favorite Trans Porn Star**: **Emma Rose**
**Favorite Independent Male Creator**: **Girthmasterr**	**Favorite Trans Cam Girl/Creator**: **Chanel Santini**
**Favorite Male Porn Star**: **Jason Luv**
