= AVN Award for Best Actress =

Annual sex industry honor

- Awarded for: Best Actress
- Country: United States
- Presented by: AVN Media Network
- First award: 1984
- Currently held by: Ryan Reid; Deadly Vows
- Website: avnawards.avn.com

The AVN Award for Best Actress is an award that has been given by sex industry company AVN since the award ceremony's inception in 1984. As of January 2026, the titleholder is Ryan Reid.

== Winners and nominees ==
=== 1984–1989 ===
Year	Photo	Winner; Film	Nominees; Films
1984		Sharon Mitchell; Sexcapades	
1985		Pamela Mann; X Factor	
1986		Sheri St. Claire (f); Corporate Assets	
1986		Ginger Lynn (v); Project Ginger	
1987		Colleen Brennan (f); Getting Personal	
1987		Nina Hartley (v); Debbie Duz Dishes	
1988		Krista Lane (f); Deep Throat II	
1988		Shanna McCullough (v); Hands Off	
1989		Ona Zee (f); Portrait of an Affair	
1989		Barbara Dare (v); Naked Stranger	

=== 1990–1994 ===
Year	Photo	Winner; Film	Nominees; Films
1990		Sharon Kane; Bodies in Heat—The Sequel	
1991		Hyapatia Lee (f); The Masseuse	
1991		Lauren Brice (v); Married Women	
1992		Jeanna Fine (f); Hothouse Rose	
1992		Ona Zee (v); The Starlet	
1993		Ashlyn Gere; Chameleons (f); Two Women (v)	
1994		Roxanne Blaze; Justine(f)	
1994		Leena Blinded By Love(v)	

=== 1995–1999 ===
Year	Photo	Winner; Film	Nominees; Films
1995		Ashlyn Gere; The Masseuse (f); Body & Soul (v)	
1996		Jeanna Fine (f); Skin Hunger	
1996		Jenna Jameson (v); Wicked One	
1997		Melissa Hill (f); Penetrator 2: Grudge Day	
1997		Jeanna Fine (v); My Surrender	
1998		Dyanna Lauren (f); Bad Wives	
1998		Stephanie Swift (v); Miscreants	
1999		Shanna McCullough (f); Looker	
1999		Jeanna Fine (v); Café Flesh 2	

=== 2000–2004 ===
Year	Photo	Winner; Film	Nominees; Films
2000		Chloe (f); Chloe	Asia Carrera; Search for the Snow Leopard
2000		Chloe (f); Chloe	Allysin Chaynes; Stray Cat
2000		Chloe (f); Chloe	Racquel Darrian; Original Sin
2000		Chloe (f); Chloe	Raylene; The Trophy
2000		Chloe (f); Chloe	Nikki Sinn; Things Change 3
2000		Chloe (f); Chloe	Gwen Summers; Nothing to Hide 3 & 4
2000		Chloe (f); Chloe	Inari Vachs; The Awakening
2000		Serenity (v); Double Feature!	
2000		Serenity (v); Double Feature!	Chloe; Taboo 19
2000		Serenity (v); Double Feature!	Kylie Ireland; Timeless
2000		Serenity (v); Double Feature!	Katja Kean; Millennium
2000		Serenity (v); Double Feature!	Ginger Lynn; Torn
2000		Serenity (v); Double Feature!	Missy; Desperate Measures
2000		Serenity (v); Double Feature!	Raylene; Manic Behavior
2000		Serenity (v); Double Feature!	Stephanie Swift; Crossroads
2001		Taylor Hayes (f); Jekyll and Hyde Raylene (f); Artemesia (tie)	Nina Hartley; A Midsummer Night's Cream
2001		Taylor Hayes (f); Jekyll and Hyde Raylene (f); Artemesia (tie)	Jenna Jameson; Dream Quest
2001		Taylor Hayes (f); Jekyll and Hyde Raylene (f); Artemesia (tie)	Julie Meadows; Watchers
2001		Taylor Hayes (f); Jekyll and Hyde Raylene (f); Artemesia (tie)	Sydnee Steele; Facade
2001		Taylor Hayes (f); Jekyll and Hyde Raylene (f); Artemesia (tie)	Gwen Summers; Looker 2: Femme Fatale
2001		Taylor Hayes (f); Jekyll and Hyde Raylene (f); Artemesia (tie)	Syren; Les Vampyres
2001		Taylor Hayes (f); Jekyll and Hyde Raylene (f); Artemesia (tie)	Inari Vachs; Facade
2001		Taylor Hayes (f); Jekyll and Hyde Raylene (f); Artemesia (tie)	Ava Vincent; Les Vampyres
2001		Serenity (v); M Caught in the Act	
2001		Serenity (v); M Caught in the Act	Juli Ashton; Bliss
2001		Serenity (v); M Caught in the Act	Asia Carrera; Goddaughter 5
2001		Serenity (v); M Caught in the Act	Jewel De'Nyle; Dark Angels
2001		Serenity (v); M Caught in the Act	Kylie Ireland; Raw
2001		Serenity (v); M Caught in the Act	Devinn Lane; Spellbound
2001		Serenity (v); M Caught in the Act	Ginger Lynn; White Lightning
2001		Serenity (v); M Caught in the Act	Tera Patrick; Sex Island
2001		Serenity (v); M Caught in the Act	Sydnee Steele; Dark Angels
2001		Serenity (v); M Caught in the Act	Gwen Summers; Virgin Whore
2001		Serenity (v); M Caught in the Act	Inari Vachs; West Side
2001		Serenity (v); M Caught in the Act	Ava Vincent; Perfectly Flawless
2002		Ginger Lynn (f); Taken	Alexa; Shrink Wrapped
2002		Ginger Lynn (f); Taken	Taylor Hayes; Fade to Black
2002		Ginger Lynn (f); Taken	Lola; Free Sex on Earth
2002		Ginger Lynn (f); Taken	Raylene; Bad Wives 2
2002		Ginger Lynn (f); Taken	Nicole Sheridan; Taboo 2001
2002		Ginger Lynn (f); Taken	Sydnee Steele; Mafioso
2002		Ginger Lynn (f); Taken	Syren; Taboo 2001
2002		Ginger Lynn (f); Taken	Ava Vincent; Underworld
2002		Sydnee Steele (v); Euphoria	Allysin Chaynes; Wonderland
2002		Sydnee Steele (v); Euphoria	Chloe; Unreal
2002		Sydnee Steele (v); Euphoria	Jewel De'Nyle; Forbidden Flesh
2002		Sydnee Steele (v); Euphoria	Lola; Destiny Calling
2002		Sydnee Steele (v); Euphoria	Gina Ryder; Nice Neighbors
2002		Sydnee Steele (v); Euphoria	Serenity; XXX Training
2002		Sydnee Steele (v); Euphoria	Inari Vachs; Beauty and the Bitch
2003		Taylor St. Claire (f); Fashionistas	Julia Ann; Paradise Lost
2003		Taylor St. Claire (f); Fashionistas	Sondra Hall; Poison Angel
2003		Taylor St. Claire (f); Fashionistas	Taylor Hayes; If You Only Knew
2003		Taylor St. Claire (f); Fashionistas	Raylene; Love Games
2003		Taylor St. Claire (f); Fashionistas	Sydnee Steele; Falling From Grace
2003		Taylor St. Claire (f); Fashionistas	Nici Sterling; Wifetaker
2003		Taylor St. Claire (f); Fashionistas	Syren; Les Vampyres 2
2003		Devinn Lane (v); Breathless	Aria; Naked Eye
2003		Devinn Lane (v); Breathless	Kate Frost; Virgin Canvas
2003		Devinn Lane (v); Breathless	Ashlyn Gere; Crime and Passion
2003		Devinn Lane (v); Breathless	Hannah Harper; Role Models 2
2003		Devinn Lane (v); Breathless	Kylie Ireland; One Sleepless Night
2003		Devinn Lane (v); Breathless	Julie Meadows; Sex World 2002
2003		Devinn Lane (v); Breathless	Alexa Rae; Karma
2003		Devinn Lane (v); Breathless	Raylene; Betrayed by Beauty
2003		Devinn Lane (v); Breathless	Sydnee Steele; Heroin
2003		Devinn Lane (v); Breathless	Gwen Summers; Double Vision
2003		Devinn Lane (v); Breathless	Ava Vincent; Heartbreaker
2004		Savanna Samson (f); Looking In	Cassidey; Sordid
2004		Savanna Samson (f); Looking In	Dasha; Heaven's Revenge
2004		Savanna Samson (f); Looking In	Maya Divine; Virtual Love
2004		Savanna Samson (f); Looking In	Ashley Long; Compulsion
2004		Julia Ann (v); Beautiful	Ashley Blue; Girlvert 4
2004		Julia Ann (v); Beautiful	Chloe; Barbara Broadcast Too!
2004		Julia Ann (v); Beautiful	Stormy Daniels; Not A Romance
2004		Julia Ann (v); Beautiful	Chloe Dior; Riptide
2004		Julia Ann (v); Beautiful	Devinn Lane; Improper Conduct
2004		Julia Ann (v); Beautiful	Kaylani Lei; Angel X
2004		Julia Ann (v); Beautiful	Carmen Luvana; Rawhide
2004		Julia Ann (v); Beautiful	Ginger Lynn; Sunset Stripped
2004		Julia Ann (v); Beautiful	Ann Marie Rios; Babes Illustrated 13
2004		Julia Ann (v); Beautiful	Savanna Samson; Good Time Girl
2004		Julia Ann (v); Beautiful	Alexandra Silk; Stud Hunters
2004		Julia Ann (v); Beautiful	Sydnee Steele; Lost & Found
2004		Julia Ann (v); Beautiful	Sunset Thomas; Truck Stop Trixie

=== 2005–2009 ===
Year	Photo	Winner; Film	Nominees; Films
2005		Jenna Jameson (f); The Masseuse	Sunrise Adams; Debbie Does Dallas: The Revenge
2005		Jenna Jameson (f); The Masseuse	Jessica Drake; The Collector
2005		Jenna Jameson (f); The Masseuse	Savanna Samson; Bare Stage
2005		Jessica Drake (v); Fluff and Fold	
2005		Jessica Drake (v); Fluff and Fold	Julia Ann; Killer Sex and Suicide Blondes
2005		Jessica Drake (v); Fluff and Fold	Roxanne Hall; Slutwoman's Revenge
2005		Jessica Drake (v); Fluff and Fold	Jenna Jameson; Bella Loves Jenna
2005		Jessica Drake (v); Fluff and Fold	Jane; Loaded
2005		Jessica Drake (v); Fluff and Fold	Kaylani Lei; Sweatshop
2005		Jessica Drake (v); Fluff and Fold	Gia Paloma; Wild Things on the Run
2005		Jessica Drake (v); Fluff and Fold	Tawny Roberts; Unlovable
2005		Jessica Drake (v); Fluff and Fold	Savanna Samson; L'Affaire
2005		Jessica Drake (v); Fluff and Fold	Aurora Snow; Angels
2005		Jessica Drake (v); Fluff and Fold	Sunset Thomas; Misty Beethoven: The Musical
2005		Jessica Drake (v); Fluff and Fold	Michelle Wild; Hot Rats
2006		Savanna Samson (f); The New Devil in Miss Jones	Sunrise Adams; Sentenced
2006		Savanna Samson (f); The New Devil in Miss Jones	Stormy Daniels; Eternity
2006		Savanna Samson (f); The New Devil in Miss Jones	Penny Flame; Dark Side
2006		Savanna Samson (f); The New Devil in Miss Jones	Janine Lindemulder; The Villa
2006		Savanna Samson (f); The New Devil in Miss Jones	Lezley Zen; Les Bitches
2006		Janine Lindemulder (v); Pirates	
2006		Janine Lindemulder (v); Pirates	Kami Andrews; Texas' Asshole Massacre
2006		Janine Lindemulder (v); Pirates	Joanna Angel; Joanna's Angels
2006		Janine Lindemulder (v); Pirates	Cindy Crawford; Sodom
2006		Janine Lindemulder (v); Pirates	Jessica Drake; One Man's Obsession
2006		Janine Lindemulder (v); Pirates	Audrey Hollander; Catherine
2006		Janine Lindemulder (v); Pirates	Jesse Jane; Pirates
2006		Janine Lindemulder (v); Pirates	Devinn Lane; Lovers Lane
2006		Janine Lindemulder (v); Pirates	Sunny Lane; Dark Angels 2: Bloodline
2006		Janine Lindemulder (v); Pirates	Kaiya Lee; Shadow of a Geisha
2006		Janine Lindemulder (v); Pirates	Gia Paloma; Wild Things on the Run 2
2006		Janine Lindemulder (v); Pirates	Olivia Saint; Contract Girl
2006		Janine Lindemulder (v); Pirates	Savanna Samson; Freshness
2006		Janine Lindemulder (v); Pirates	Brittney Skye; Prisoner
2007		Jessica Drake (f); Manhunters	Monique Alexander; To Die For
2007		Jessica Drake (f); Manhunters	Janine Lindemulder; Emperor
2007		Jessica Drake (f); Manhunters	Austin Kincaid; To Die For
2007		Jessica Drake (f); Manhunters	Ava Vincent; Fade to Black 2
2007		Hillary Scott (v); Corruption	
2007		Hillary Scott (v); Corruption	Joanna Angel; Joanna's Angels 2: Alt Throttle
2007		Hillary Scott (v); Corruption	Belladonna; Fashionistas Safado: The Challenge
2007		Hillary Scott (v); Corruption	Violet Blue; Wonderland
2007		Hillary Scott (v); Corruption	Stormy Daniels; Taken
2007		Hillary Scott (v); Corruption	Jessica Drake; Curse Eternal
2007		Hillary Scott (v); Corruption	Kimberly Kane; The Visitors
2007		Hillary Scott (v); Corruption	Sunny Lane; Sex Pix
2007		Hillary Scott (v); Corruption	Nina Mercedez; Illicit
2007		Hillary Scott (v); Corruption	Missy Monroe; The Da Vinci Load
2007		Hillary Scott (v); Corruption	Austyn Moore; Tailgunners
2007		Hillary Scott (v); Corruption	Kirsten Price; Just Like That
2007		Hillary Scott (v); Corruption	Linda Roberts; The New Neighbors
2007		Hillary Scott (v); Corruption	Brittney Skye; Grub Girl
2007		Hillary Scott (v); Corruption	Heather Vuur; Sacred Sin
2008		Penny Flame (f); Layout	Briana Banks; Layout
2008		Penny Flame (f); Layout	Roxy Jezel; Sex & Violins
2008		Penny Flame (f); Layout	Stefani Morgan; Debbie Does Dallas ... Again
2008		Penny Flame (f); Layout	Savanna Samson; Flasher
2008		Eva Angelina (v); Upload	
2008		Eva Angelina (v); Upload	Stormy Daniels; Black Widow
2008		Eva Angelina (v); Upload	Jessica Drake; Delilah
2008		Eva Angelina (v); Upload	Carmen Hart; Just Between Us
2008		Eva Angelina (v); Upload	Jenna Jameson; Janine Loves Jenna
2008		Eva Angelina (v); Upload	Roxy Jezel; For Love, Money or a Green Card
2008		Eva Angelina (v); Upload	Tory Lane; Outkast
2008		Eva Angelina (v); Upload	Kaylani Lei; Candelabra
2008		Eva Angelina (v); Upload	Brianna Love; Brianna Love: Her Fine Sexy Self
2008		Eva Angelina (v); Upload	Carmen Luvana; Lady Scarface
2008		Eva Angelina (v); Upload	Kirsten Price; Coming Home
2008		Eva Angelina (v); Upload	Savanna Samson; Stood Up
2008		Eva Angelina (v); Upload	Lorena Sanchez; Black Worm
2008		Eva Angelina (v); Upload	Hillary Scott; Not the Bradys XXX
2008		Eva Angelina (v); Upload	Simone Valentino; Afrodite Superstar
2009		Jessica Drake; Fallen	Monique Alexander; Cry Wolf
2009		Jessica Drake; Fallen	Roxy DeVille; The Texas Vibrator Massacre
2009		Jessica Drake; Fallen	Sasha Grey; The Last Rose
2009		Jessica Drake; Fallen	Carmen Hart; Fired
2009		Jessica Drake; Fallen	Jenna Haze; Not Bewitched XXX
2009		Jessica Drake; Fallen	Jenna Jameson; Burn
2009		Jessica Drake; Fallen	Jesse Jane; Pirates II: Stagnetti's Revenge
2009		Jessica Drake; Fallen	Devon Lee; Succubus of the Rouge
2009		Jessica Drake; Fallen	Kaylani Lei; The Wicked
2009		Jessica Drake; Fallen	Janine Lindemulder; Pipe Dreams
2009		Jessica Drake; Fallen	Marie McCray; Angel Faces
2009		Jessica Drake; Fallen	Bree Olson; Roller Dollz
2009		Jessica Drake; Fallen	Kirsten Price; Mouth
2009		Jessica Drake; Fallen	Savanna Samson; Miles from Needles

=== 2010–2014 ===
Year	Photo	Winner; Film	Nominees; Films
2010		Kimberly Kane; The Sex Files: A Dark XXX Parody	Asa Akira; Pure
2010		Kimberly Kane; The Sex Files: A Dark XXX Parody	Julia Ann; Identity
2010		Kimberly Kane; The Sex Files: A Dark XXX Parody	Lisa Ann; Who's Nailin' Paylin?
2010		Kimberly Kane; The Sex Files: A Dark XXX Parody	Alektra Blue; Educating Alli
2010		Kimberly Kane; The Sex Files: A Dark XXX Parody	Roxy DeVille; Whack Job
2010		Kimberly Kane; The Sex Files: A Dark XXX Parody	Jessica Drake; Hush
2010		Kimberly Kane; The Sex Files: A Dark XXX Parody	Sasha Grey; Throat: A Cautionary Tale
2010		Kimberly Kane; The Sex Files: A Dark XXX Parody	Audrey Hollander; Everybody Loves Lucy
2010		Kimberly Kane; The Sex Files: A Dark XXX Parody	Kayden Kross; The 8th Day
2010		Kimberly Kane; The Sex Files: A Dark XXX Parody	Kelli McCarty; Faithless
2010		Kimberly Kane; The Sex Files: A Dark XXX Parody	Melissa Monet; My Daughter's Boyfriend
2010		Kimberly Kane; The Sex Files: A Dark XXX Parody	Bree Olson; One Last Ride
2010		Kimberly Kane; The Sex Files: A Dark XXX Parody	Hillary Scott; Heaven
2010		Kimberly Kane; The Sex Files: A Dark XXX Parody	India Summer; Drill Baby Drill
2011		Andy San Dimas; This Ain't Glee XXX India Summer; An Open Invitation: A Real Swinger's Party in San Francisco (tie)	Nyomi Banxxx; Fatally Obsessed
2011		Andy San Dimas; This Ain't Glee XXX India Summer; An Open Invitation: A Real Swinger's Party in San Francisco (tie)	Tori Black; Whatever It Takes
2011		Andy San Dimas; This Ain't Glee XXX India Summer; An Open Invitation: A Real Swinger's Party in San Francisco (tie)	Ashlynn Brooke; WKRP in Cincinnati: A XXX Parody
2011		Andy San Dimas; This Ain't Glee XXX India Summer; An Open Invitation: A Real Swinger's Party in San Francisco (tie)	Stormy Daniels; Partly Stormy
2011		Andy San Dimas; This Ain't Glee XXX India Summer; An Open Invitation: A Real Swinger's Party in San Francisco (tie)	Jessica Drake; 3 Days in June
2011		Andy San Dimas; This Ain't Glee XXX India Summer; An Open Invitation: A Real Swinger's Party in San Francisco (tie)	Penny Flame; Real Wife Stories 6
2011		Andy San Dimas; This Ain't Glee XXX India Summer; An Open Invitation: A Real Swinger's Party in San Francisco (tie)	Roxanne Hall; Scorned
2011		Andy San Dimas; This Ain't Glee XXX India Summer; An Open Invitation: A Real Swinger's Party in San Francisco (tie)	Nikki Jayne; The Condemned
2011		Andy San Dimas; This Ain't Glee XXX India Summer; An Open Invitation: A Real Swinger's Party in San Francisco (tie)	Kimberly Kane; The Sex Files 2: A Dark XXX Parody
2011		Andy San Dimas; This Ain't Glee XXX India Summer; An Open Invitation: A Real Swinger's Party in San Francisco (tie)	Kayden Kross; The Perfect Secretary: Training Day
2011		Andy San Dimas; This Ain't Glee XXX India Summer; An Open Invitation: A Real Swinger's Party in San Francisco (tie)	Sunny Lane; Alice
2011		Andy San Dimas; This Ain't Glee XXX India Summer; An Open Invitation: A Real Swinger's Party in San Francisco (tie)	Sunny Leone; Gia: Portrait of a Porn Star
2011		Andy San Dimas; This Ain't Glee XXX India Summer; An Open Invitation: A Real Swinger's Party in San Francisco (tie)	Lia; The Rush
2011		Andy San Dimas; This Ain't Glee XXX India Summer; An Open Invitation: A Real Swinger's Party in San Francisco (tie)	Natasha Marley; Bonny & Clide
2011		Andy San Dimas; This Ain't Glee XXX India Summer; An Open Invitation: A Real Swinger's Party in San Francisco (tie)	Samantha Ryan; Awakening to Love
2011		Andy San Dimas; This Ain't Glee XXX India Summer; An Open Invitation: A Real Swinger's Party in San Francisco (tie)	Riley Steele; Love Fool
2011		Andy San Dimas; This Ain't Glee XXX India Summer; An Open Invitation: A Real Swinger's Party in San Francisco (tie)	Misty Stone; A Love Triangle
2011		Andy San Dimas; This Ain't Glee XXX India Summer; An Open Invitation: A Real Swinger's Party in San Francisco (tie)	Stoya; Stoya: Perfect Picture
2012		Jessie Andrews; Portrait of a Call Girl	Capri Anderson; Runaway
2012		Jessie Andrews; Portrait of a Call Girl	Tori Black; Killer Bodies
2012		Jessie Andrews; Portrait of a Call Girl	Jessica Drake; Horizon
2012		Jessie Andrews; Portrait of a Call Girl	Allie Haze; Lost and Found
2012		Jessie Andrews; Portrait of a Call Girl	Helly Mae Hellfire; This Ain't Lady Gaga XXX
2012		Jessie Andrews; Portrait of a Call Girl	Kagney Linn Karter; Official The Silence of the Lambs Parody
2012		Jessie Andrews; Portrait of a Call Girl	Kayden Kross; Love & Marriage
2012		Jessie Andrews; Portrait of a Call Girl	Lily LaBeau; The Incredible Hulk XXX: A Porn Parody
2012		Jessie Andrews; Portrait of a Call Girl	Natasha Nice; Dear Abby
2012		Jessie Andrews; Portrait of a Call Girl	Savanna Samson; Savanna Samson Is the Masseuse
2012		Jessie Andrews; Portrait of a Call Girl	Andy San Dimas; Rezervoir Doggs: An Exquisite Films Parody
2012		Jessie Andrews; Portrait of a Call Girl	Hillary Scott; The Flintstones: A XXX Parody
2012		Jessie Andrews; Portrait of a Call Girl	Bobbi Starr; A Little Part of Me
2012		Jessie Andrews; Portrait of a Call Girl	Misty Stone; Hustler's Untrue Hollywood Stories: Oprah
2013		Lily Carter; Wasteland	Nyomi Banxxx; Training Day: A Pleasure Dynasty Parody
2013		Lily Carter; Wasteland	Alektra Blue; Next Friday Night
2013		Lily Carter; Wasteland	Gracie Glam; Happy Endings
2013		Lily Carter; Wasteland	Presley Hart; Diary of Love
2013		Lily Carter; Wasteland	Allie Haze; Star Wars XXX: A Porn Parody
2013		Lily Carter; Wasteland	Lily LaBeau; Wasteland
2013		Lily Carter; Wasteland	Remy LaCroix; Torn
2013		Lily Carter; Wasteland	Brooklyn Lee; Voracious: The First Season
2013		Lily Carter; Wasteland	Kaylani Lei; Snatched
2013		Lily Carter; Wasteland	Natasha Nice; Love is a Dangerous Game
2013		Lily Carter; Wasteland	Chanel Preston; Romeo & Juliet: A DreamZone Parody
2013		Lily Carter; Wasteland	Andy San Dimas; Café Amore
2013		Lily Carter; Wasteland	Bobbi Starr; The Truth About O
2013		Lily Carter; Wasteland	India Summer; The Graduate XXX: A Paul Thomas Parody
2014		Remy LaCroix; The Temptation of Eve	Anikka Albrite; OMG… It’s the Leaving Las Vegas XXX Parody
2014		Remy LaCroix; The Temptation of Eve	Lexi Belle; Meant to Be
2014		Remy LaCroix; The Temptation of Eve	Alektra Blue; Getting Schooled
2014		Remy LaCroix; The Temptation of Eve	Jessica Drake; Sexpionage: The Drake Chronicles
2014		Remy LaCroix; The Temptation of Eve	Tara Lynn Foxx; This Ain't Homeland XXX
2014		Remy LaCroix; The Temptation of Eve	Allie Haze; Clerks XXX: A Porn Parody
2014		Remy LaCroix; The Temptation of Eve	Jesse Jane; Code of Honor
2014		Remy LaCroix; The Temptation of Eve	Sunny Lane; The Stripper 2
2014		Remy LaCroix; The Temptation of Eve	Brooklyn Lee; The New Behind the Green Door
2014		Remy LaCroix; The Temptation of Eve	Adrianna Luna; The Lone Ranger XXX: An Extreme Comixxx Parody
2014		Remy LaCroix; The Temptation of Eve	Maddy O'Reilly; Not The Wizard of Oz XXX
2014		Remy LaCroix; The Temptation of Eve	Penny Pax; The Submission of Emma Marx
2014		Remy LaCroix; The Temptation of Eve	Raven Rockette; Gia: Lesbian Supermodel
2014		Remy LaCroix; The Temptation of Eve	Jennifer White; The Stripper

=== 2015–2019 ===
Year	Photo	Winner; Film	Nominees; Films
2015		Carter Cruise; Second Chances	Asa Akira; Holly...Would
2015		Carter Cruise; Second Chances	Anikka Albrite; Untamed Heart
2015		Carter Cruise; Second Chances	Alex Chance; This Ain't Girls XXX
2015		Carter Cruise; Second Chances	Brooklyn Chase; Odd Jobs
2015		Carter Cruise; Second Chances	Jessica Drake; Aftermath
2015		Carter Cruise; Second Chances	Ash Hollywood; No Way Out
2015		Carter Cruise; Second Chances	Kimberly Kane; The Pornographer
2015		Carter Cruise; Second Chances	Maddy O'Reilly; The Sexual Liberation of Anna Lee
2015		Carter Cruise; Second Chances	Penny Pax; Wetwork
2015		Carter Cruise; Second Chances	Romi Rain; The Laws of Love
2015		Carter Cruise; Second Chances	Bonnie Rotten; Cape Fear XXX
2015		Carter Cruise; Second Chances	Samantha Saint; Cinderella XXX: An Axel Braun Parody
2015		Carter Cruise; Second Chances	Stevie Shae; Apocalypse X
2015		Carter Cruise; Second Chances	Jodi West; Call Me Mother
2016		Penny Pax; The Submission of Emma Marx: Boundaries	Asa Akira; Starmaker
2016		Penny Pax; The Submission of Emma Marx: Boundaries	Adriana Chechik; The Turning
2016		Penny Pax; The Submission of Emma Marx: Boundaries	Carter Cruise; Waiting on Love
2016		Penny Pax; The Submission of Emma Marx: Boundaries	Dani Daniels; Sisterhood
2016		Penny Pax; The Submission of Emma Marx: Boundaries	Stormy Daniels; Wanted
2016		Penny Pax; The Submission of Emma Marx: Boundaries	Dana DeArmond; Mother's Little Helper
2016		Penny Pax; The Submission of Emma Marx: Boundaries	Daisy Haze; Bad Romance
2016		Penny Pax; The Submission of Emma Marx: Boundaries	Kimberly Kane; Family Secrets
2016		Penny Pax; The Submission of Emma Marx: Boundaries	Remy LaCroix; Stockholm Syndrome
2016		Penny Pax; The Submission of Emma Marx: Boundaries	Keira Nicole; Peter Pan XXX: An Axel Braun Parody
2016		Penny Pax; The Submission of Emma Marx: Boundaries	Bonnie Rotten; Sisters of Anarchy
2016		Penny Pax; The Submission of Emma Marx: Boundaries	Riley Steele; Barbarella XXX: An Axel Braun Parody
2016		Penny Pax; The Submission of Emma Marx: Boundaries	India Summer; Marriage 2.0
2016		Penny Pax; The Submission of Emma Marx: Boundaries	Sarah Vandella; Love, Sex & TV News
2017		Kleio Valentien; Suicide Squad XXX: An Axel Braun Parody	Asa Akira; The J.O.B.
2017		Kleio Valentien; Suicide Squad XXX: An Axel Braun Parody	Aria Alexander; Sex Machina: A XXX Parody
2017		Kleio Valentien; Suicide Squad XXX: An Axel Braun Parody	Samantha Bentley; Hard in Love
2017		Kleio Valentien; Suicide Squad XXX: An Axel Braun Parody	Carter Cruise; Suicide Squad XXX: An Axel Braun Parody
2017		Kleio Valentien; Suicide Squad XXX: An Axel Braun Parody	Cherie DeVille; Project Pandora: A Psychosexual Lesbian Thriller
2017		Kleio Valentien; Suicide Squad XXX: An Axel Braun Parody	Jessica Drake; DNA
2017		Kleio Valentien; Suicide Squad XXX: An Axel Braun Parody	Karlee Grey; Student Bodies 5
2017		Kleio Valentien; Suicide Squad XXX: An Axel Braun Parody	Veruca James; Deception: A XXX Thriller
2017		Kleio Valentien; Suicide Squad XXX: An Axel Braun Parody	Cassidy Klein; Little Red: A Lesbian Fairy Tale
2017		Kleio Valentien; Suicide Squad XXX: An Axel Braun Parody	Sara Luvv; Babysitting the Baumgartners
2017		Kleio Valentien; Suicide Squad XXX: An Axel Braun Parody	Abigail Mac; True Detective: A XXX Parody
2017		Kleio Valentien; Suicide Squad XXX: An Axel Braun Parody	Penny Pax; The Submission of Emma Marx: Exposed
2017		Kleio Valentien; Suicide Squad XXX: An Axel Braun Parody	Dana Vespoli; Lefty
2017		Kleio Valentien; Suicide Squad XXX: An Axel Braun Parody	Kasey Warner; Color Blind
2018		Sara Luvv; The Faces of Alice	Asa Akira; The Blonde Dahlia
2018		Sara Luvv; The Faces of Alice	Chloe Amour; Love for Sale 2
2018		Sara Luvv; The Faces of Alice	Abella Danger; The Obsession
2018		Sara Luvv; The Faces of Alice	Jessica Drake; An Inconvenient Mistress
2018		Sara Luvv; The Faces of Alice	Alexis Fawx; Fantasy Factory
2018		Sara Luvv; The Faces of Alice	Alexa Grace; Crash
2018		Sara Luvv; The Faces of Alice	Janice Griffith; Ingenue
2018		Sara Luvv; The Faces of Alice	Jill Kassidy; Half His Age: A Teenage Tragedy
2018		Sara Luvv; The Faces of Alice	Cassidy Klein; Conflicted
2018		Sara Luvv; The Faces of Alice	Melissa Moore; The Voyeur
2018		Sara Luvv; The Faces of Alice	Katie Morgan; Bad Babes Inc.
2018		Sara Luvv; The Faces of Alice	Ella Nova; Snapshot
2018		Sara Luvv; The Faces of Alice	Romi Rain; Justice League XXX: An Axel Braun Parody
2018		Sara Luvv; The Faces of Alice	Angela White; The Altar of Aphrodite
2019		Eliza Jane; Anne: A Taboo Parody	Britney Amber; Naked
2019		Eliza Jane; Anne: A Taboo Parody	Mercedes Carrera; Second First Date
2019		Eliza Jane; Anne: A Taboo Parody	Adriana Chechik; Star Wars: The Last Temptation - A Digital Playground XXX Parody
2019		Eliza Jane; Anne: A Taboo Parody	Jessica Drake; Fallen II: Angels & Demons
2019		Eliza Jane; Anne: A Taboo Parody	Kimmy Granger; Poon Raider: A DP XXX Parody
2019		Eliza Jane; Anne: A Taboo Parody	Aaliyah Love; Too Little Too Late
2019		Eliza Jane; Anne: A Taboo Parody	Avi Love; The Possession of Mrs. Hyde
2019		Eliza Jane; Anne: A Taboo Parody	Abigail Mac; Fantasy Factory: Wastelands
2019		Eliza Jane; Anne: A Taboo Parody	Gia Paige; Love in the Digital Age
2019		Eliza Jane; Anne: A Taboo Parody	Kenzie Reeves; A Trailer Park Taboo
2019		Eliza Jane; Anne: A Taboo Parody	Kristen Scott; Camgirl
2019		Eliza Jane; Anne: A Taboo Parody	India Summer; Flawless
2019		Eliza Jane; Anne: A Taboo Parody	Mona Wales; Insomnia
2019		Eliza Jane; Anne: A Taboo Parody	Whitney Wright; Cursed

=== 2020–2024 ===
Year	Photo	Winner; Film	Nominees; Films
2020		Angela White; Perspective	Aiden Ashley; Insomniac
2020		Angela White; Perspective	Christiana Cinn; Arcane
2020		Angela White; Perspective	Jessica Drake; Lost Love
2020		Angela White; Perspective	Lacy Lennon; The Gentleman
2020		Angela White; Perspective	Kristen Scott; Teenage Lesbian
2020		Angela White; Perspective	Magdalene St. Michaels; Confessions of A Sinful Nun 2: The Rise of Sister Mona
2020		Angela White; Perspective	Kenzie Taylor; Captain Marvel XXX: An Axel Braun Parody
2020		Angela White; Perspective	Whitney Wright; What We Do for Money
2020		Angela White; Perspective	Ariel X Girls of Wrestling
2021		Maitland Ward; Muse	Aiden Ashley; A Killer on the Loose
2021		Maitland Ward; Muse	Cherie DeVille; 40 Years Old, Comes to Life
2021		Maitland Ward; Muse	Ana Foxxx; Primary
2021		Maitland Ward; Muse	Kimmy Granger; Vacation in Purgatory
2021		Maitland Ward; Muse	Madison Ivy; No Mercy for Mankind
2021		Maitland Ward; Muse	Lacy Lennon; Alien Rhapsody
2021		Maitland Ward; Muse	Cadence Lux; The Producer II
2021		Maitland Ward; Muse	Naomi Swann; My Sinful Valentine
2021		Maitland Ward; Muse	Mona Wales; Pushing Boundaries
2022		Kenna James; Under the Veil	Aiden Ashley; Blue Moon Rising
2022		Kenna James; Under the Veil	Casey Calvert; Primary Season 2
2022		Kenna James; Under the Veil	Gianna Dior; Psychosexual
2022		Kenna James; Under the Veil	Aila Donovan; Toxic
2022		Kenna James; Under the Veil	Ana Foxxx; Sweet Sweet Sally Mae
2022		Kenna James; Under the Veil	Mariska; Betrayal
2022		Kenna James; Under the Veil	Maitland Ward; Muse Season 2
2022		Kenna James; Under the Veil	Jane Wilde; Succubus
2022		Kenna James; Under the Veil	Emily Willis; Influence Emily Willis
2023		Maitland Ward; Drift	Aiden Ashley; Hysteria
2023		Maitland Ward; Drift	Kenna James; Dark Is the Night
2023		Maitland Ward; Drift	Freya Parker; Duplicity
2023		Maitland Ward; Drift	September Reign; Love, Sex & Music
2023		Maitland Ward; Drift	Vanessa Sky; My Best Friend's Girl
2023		Maitland Ward; Drift	Charlotte Stokely; Another Night in the Valley
2023		Maitland Ward; Drift	Kenzie Taylor; Deranged (Vols. 1 & 2)
2023		Maitland Ward; Drift	Jane Wilde; Stars
2023		Maitland Ward; Drift	Emily Willis; One Night in Los Angeles
2024		Kira Noir; Machine Gunner	Lilly Bell; Trouble
2024		Kira Noir; Machine Gunner	Lulu Chu; Feed Me
2024		Kira Noir; Machine Gunner	Avery Cristy; The View
2024		Kira Noir; Machine Gunner	Stormy Daniels; Redemption
2024		Kira Noir; Machine Gunner	Ana Foxxx; Sally Mae: The Revenge of the Twin Dragons
2024		Kira Noir; Machine Gunner	Nicole Kitt; Ashford Manor
2024		Kira Noir; Machine Gunner	April Olsen; Hang in There, Abigail
2024		Kira Noir; Machine Gunner	Freya Parker; The Seductress 4
2024		Kira Noir; Machine Gunner	Ivy Wolfe; Reckless

=== 2025– ===
2025	Casey Calvert	Casey Calvert; Birth	Lilly Bell; Last Splash
2025	Casey Calvert	Casey Calvert; Birth	Blake Blossom; Iris
2025	Casey Calvert	Casey Calvert; Birth	Cherie DeVille; Project X
2025	Casey Calvert	Casey Calvert; Birth	Reagan Foxx; Let Me In
2025	Casey Calvert	Casey Calvert; Birth	Nicole Kitt; Dirty Cops
2025	Casey Calvert	Casey Calvert; Birth	Adria Rae; Gold Diggers
2025	Casey Calvert	Casey Calvert; Birth	Lumi Ray; Amuse Bouche
2025	Casey Calvert	Casey Calvert; Birth	Victoria Voxxx; Alive
2025	Casey Calvert	Casey Calvert; Birth	Maitland Ward; American MILF
2026		Ryan Reid; Deadly Vows	Lilly Bell; The Secrets We Share
2026		Ryan Reid; Deadly Vows	Blake Blossom; Wanted
2026		Ryan Reid; Deadly Vows	Anna Claire Clouds; Clout
2026		Ryan Reid; Deadly Vows	Reagan Foxx; Hard Stop
2026		Ryan Reid; Deadly Vows	Sophia Locke; Mind Games
2026		Ryan Reid; Deadly Vows	Lexi Luna; Breadcrumbs
2026		Ryan Reid; Deadly Vows	Kira Noir; Payback's a Bitch
2026		Ryan Reid; Deadly Vows	Jasmine Sherni; Ghosted
2026		Ryan Reid; Deadly Vows	Jennifer White; Once Upon a Time in the Valley
2027			Adriana Chechik; Dirty Game
2027			Anna Claire Clouds; Raw
2027			Elly Clutch; In the Bag
2027			Jewel Diamant; Equilibrium
2027			Ophelia Fae; Straight Girls
2027			Cherry Kiss; Cherry on Top
2027			Nicole Kitt; Daggers
2027			Octavia Red; Through Her Lens
2027			Dana Vespoli; Summer & Joy
2027			Addison Vodka; In the Bag

== See also ==
- AVN Award for Best Actor
- AVN Award for Best Supporting Actress
- AVN Award for Female Performer of the Year
- AVN Award for Female Foreign Performer of the Year
