= Octavia Red =

American pornographic film actress

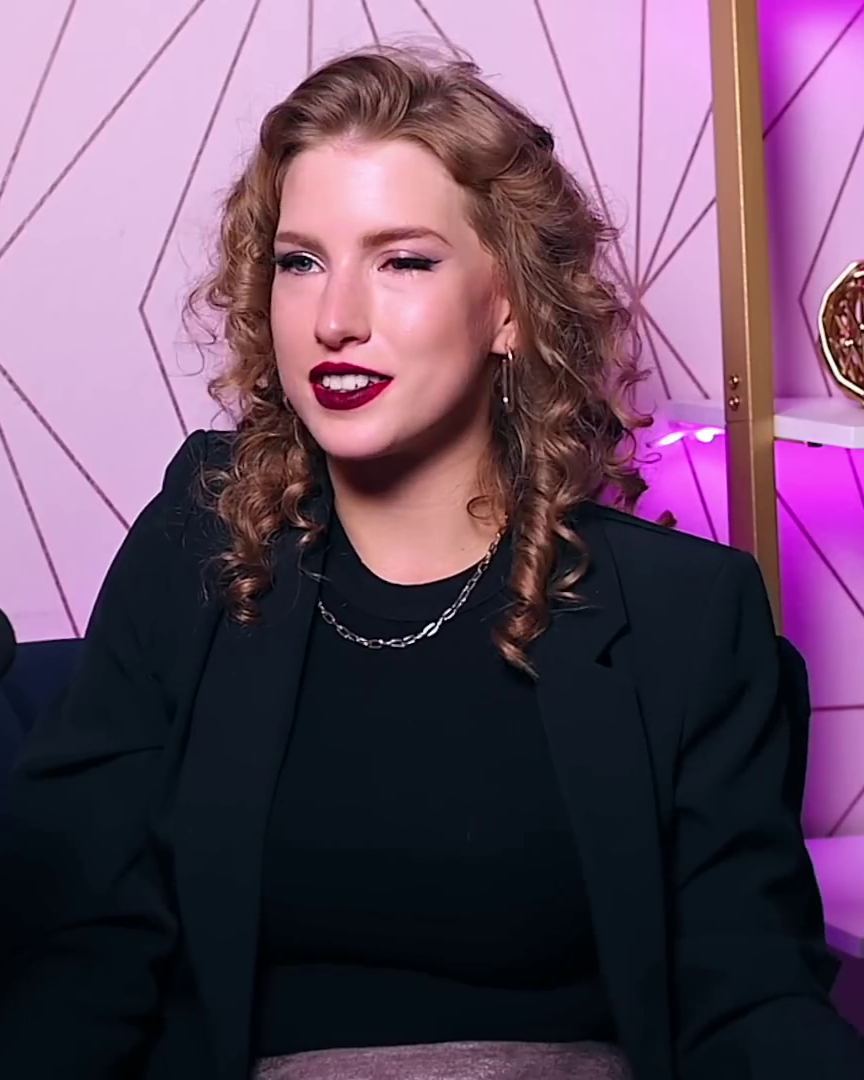
- Red in 2025
- Occupation: Pornographic film actress
- Years active: 2020–present

Octavia Red is an American pornographic film actress who has been credited with many film appearances and won multiple awards.

== Career ==
Red began her OnlyFans account in the spring of 2020, and was recruited by Net Video Girls, filming three scenes for the company. However, due to concerns about her family's judgement, she returned to work on a cannabis farm and a casino. She later decided to return to adult films after the harassment she had faced at the casino, officially returning to the industry in the fall of 2021.

In 2025, Red won her first AVN Award at the 42nd AVN Awards for 'Best Girl/Girl Sex Scene' alongside Blake Blossom. She had also been nominated for multiple other awards that year.

That same year, Red was implicated by social media personality Amouranth of having received payment from her ex-husband Nick Lee. Amouranth had accused Lee of emotional and physical abuse, stating that he had utilized his wife's money to pay multiple escorts, including an individual named 'Octavia Red'. Red denied the allegations, stating that it 'didn't happen'.

Red was nominated in the 43rd AVN Awards, where she won in two categories. 2026 also saw Red securing other awards, including the XMA Award for 'Girl/Girl Performer of the Year' and a DSN Award. She had been nominated for 12 XMA Awards that year.

Red has been frequently praised for her professionalism and attitude by those throughout the adult film industry. Other than annual awards, she has also had multiple monthly selections, including being selected as the TeamSkeet AllStar for April 2023 and Nubile Films' 'Fantasy of the Month' for October 2023.

== Personal life ==
According to Red, she grew up in a very religious household and was schooled remotely from kindergarten until sixth grade. Her mother had mental issues and frequently physically abused Red and her 10 siblings. Red attended school in-person from seventh grade, graduated from high school and worked at a Starbucks in Bend, Oregon before moving back to California to work at a casino and cannabis farm. After the casino closed due to the COVID-19 pandemic, she made the decision to begin an OnlyFans account.

Red still maintains a good relationship with her siblings.

== Awards ==
- 2025 AVN Award – Best Girl-Girl Sex Scene (with Blake Blossom) – Titwoman vs Titwoman
- 2026 XMA Award – Girl/Girl Performer of the Year
- 2026 AVN Award – Best All-Girl Group Sex Scene (with Anna Claire Clouds, Jennifer White, Vanna Bardot, Blake Blossom, Lilly Bell, and Jewelz Blu) – Performers of the Year 2025: Lesbian Orgy
- 2026 AVN Award – Best Foursome/Orgy Scene (with Anna Claire Clouds, Myra Moans, Scarlett Alexis, and Ryan Driller) – Overload Act 3
- 2026 Doppio Senso Night Award – International Female Performer of the Year
- 2026 XRCO Award – Personal Favorite
- 2026 NightMoves Award – Best Actress
