= Blake Blossom =

American pornographic film actress (born 2000)

- Blake Blossom
- Born: February 2000 (age 26)
- Occupation: Pornographic film actress
- Years active: 2020–present

Blake Blossom (born February 2000) is an American pornographic film actress. She began working in the adult entertainment industry in 2020 and has received multiple industry awards.

== Career ==
Born in California and raised in a conservative environment in Arizona, Blake Blossom described herself as a "goody-two-shoes nanny" before joining the porn industry.

Blossom became curious about adult content in 2019 and launched an OnlyFans account the day after her 20th birthday in February 2020. She made her professional debut in March 2020 in a scene for Exploited College Girls.

During the first nine months of her career Blossom was credited for performing in over 100 scenes.

In December 2020, Blossom was featured as Penthouse's Pet of the Month. She has also been selected as Twistys' Treat of the Month, Nubiles' Fantasy of the Month, Cherry Pimps' Cherry of the Month and Team Skeet's All Star for August 2021.

Blossom's many credits also include work for production companies such as Vixen, Bang Bros, Reality Kings and Mofos.

In April 2021, XBIZ reported that Blossom starred in Skirt Sale for the Deeper label, directed by Kayden Kross. In subsequent years, she has starred in scenes for Bellesa Films, Blacked, Brazzers, Dorcel, New Sensations and Sweet Sinner, among other studios.

In January 2025 Blossom hosted the 42nd AVN Awards.

In 2026 Blossom appeared in the mainstream dark comedy film Dead Janitors Club, playing hostage in an action scene. The same year, Blake to the Future, an official Blake Blossom comic series was launched.

== Awards ==
At the 2021 NightMoves Awards, Blossom won Best New Starlet (Editor's Choice). At the 2022 NightMoves Awards, she won Best Female Performer.

At the 2022 AVN Awards, Blossom won Best New Starlet and Hottest Newcomer.

At the 2023 AVN Awards, Blossom won Best Actress – Featurette for An Honest Man, Best Boy/Girl Sex Scene, and Best Virtual Reality Sex Scene.

At the 2024 AVN Awards Blossom won awards for Best All-Girl Sex Scene, Best Solo/Tease Performance, Best VR Group Scene and Best VR One-On-One Sex Scene.

At the 2024 XBIZ Awards, Blossom was part of the cast that won Best Sex Scene – Gonzo for Take Me to Your Breeder.

At the 2025 AVN Awards, Blossom and Octavia Red won Best Girl/Girl Sex Scene for Titwoman vs. Titwoman.

At the 2026 AVN Awards Blossom won awards for Best All-Girl Sex Scene, Best Blowbang Scene and Best VR One-On-One Sex Scene.

At the 2026 XRCO Awards, Blossom won the Orgasmic Oralist award.
