= Kylie Rocket =

American pornographic film actress (born 2001/2002)

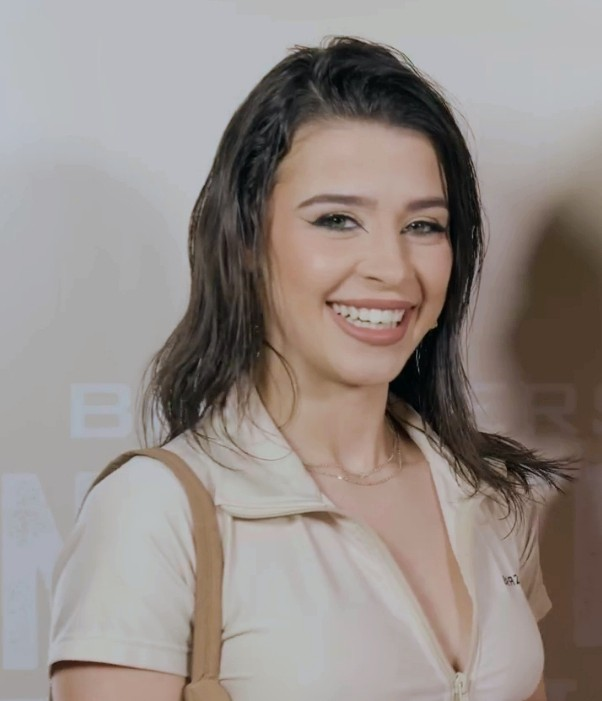
- Rocket in 2023
- Born: 2001 or 2002 (age 23–24); Orange Park, Florida, U.S.
- Occupation: Pornographic film actress
- Years active: 2019–present

Kylie Rocket (born 2001 or 2002) is an American pornographic film actress. Starting her career in 2019, Rocket has won multiple awards throughout her career, including multiple AVN Awards.

== Early and personal life ==
Born and raised in Orange Park, Florida, Rocket began working at Chick-fil-A as a teenager while also starting her career in adult film.

She is of Puerto Rican descent. While appearing in adult films, she also attended cosmetology school. According to Rocket, her family, including her twin sister, were largely supportive of her career choice.

== Career ==
Rocket joined Motley Models in 2019, but delayed her move to California until August due to the COVID-19 pandemic. Before she moved to California, she had already produced her own interactive films as a part of Team Skeet and StayHomePOV. She was selected as 'Cherry of the Month' in February 2021. In October of that year, Rocket signed an exclusive contract with Reality Kings.

Rocket was selected as the cover girl for the August 2023 edition of Hustler magazine. Rocket has been nominated for AVN Awards every year between 2021 and 2026, winning one award in 2024 and two in 2026. Kylie Rocket along with performer Melissa Stratton were nominated for Hottest Group Creator Collab in collaboration with 2 Drops during the 2026 AVN Awards.

According to AEBN statistics from the second quarter of 2024, Rocket was one of the top-selling actresses for that period.

Outside of adult films, she also appeared in the comedy film Love, Sex, & Hollywood.

== Awards ==
- 2024 XBIZ Award – Best Sex Scene - Virtual Reality – Wet & Wild in Tulum
- 2024 AVN Award – Best Foursome/Orgy Scene – Blacked Raw V70
- 2025 NightMoves Award – Best Girl/Girl Performer
- 2026 AVN Award – Hottest Group Creator Collab
- 2026 AVN Award – Best Oral Sex Scene – Wanted
- 2026 AVN Award – Best Three-Way Sex Scene – Threesome Temptations
- 2026 XRCO Award – Girl/Girl Performer of the Year
