= Vanna Bardot =

American pornographic film actress (born 1998/1999)

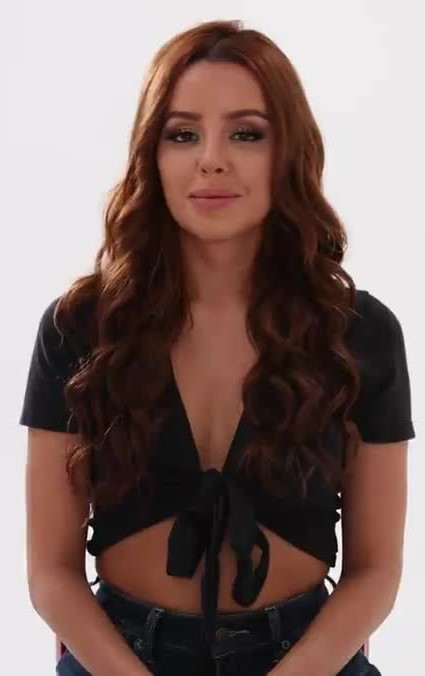
- Bardot in 2021
- Born: 1998 or 1999 (age 27–28)
- Occupation: Pornographic film actress
- Years active: 2018–present

Vanna Bardot (born 1998 or 1999) is an American pornographic film actress. She has won multiple awards within her career, including the 2023 XBIZ Award for Female Performer of the Year, the 2024 AVN Award for Female Performer of the Year, and the 2024 XBIZ and XRCO Female Performer of the Year awards.

== Career ==
Early in her career, Bardot cited the goal of winning awards as a motivator within the industry.

She was named the Cherry Pimps Cherry and Bang! Babe of the Month in November 2020 and January 2021, respectively. In 2022, Bardot signed an exclusive contract with Slayed, a division of Vixen Media Group. She has been a frequent feature for the company.

In 2023, she was the main actress in Influence: Vanna Bardot, directed by Kayden Kross, playing herself.

In 2024, she was selected the AVN Female Performer of the Year.

Bardot was also mentioned as one of the adult actresses who were a part of the rise of 'braces porn'. She was also one of the featured actresses in the Adult Time series Cardiogasm.

Outside of adult films, Bardot also featured in the 2023 comedy film The Wine Club.

== Personal life ==
Bardot is a native of Miami, Florida.

Before working in the adult film industry, Bardot wanted to be a hairstylist and had worked in salons from age 15 until age 18, then working as a ballet and club dancer in Miami. She stated her adult film pseudonym was taken from a crush she had in middle school.

In 2023, Bardot was reportedly dating fellow adult film actor Codey Steele.

== Awards ==
- 2021 AVN Award – Best Solo/Tease Performance – Dance for Me
- 2022 AVN Award – Best Girl/Girl Sex Scene (with Emily Willis) – Light Me Up
- 2022 AVN Award – Best Three-Way Sex Scene (with Avery Cristy and Oliver Flynn) – Three 2
- 2022 Fleshbot Award – Best Girl-Girl Performer
- 2023 AVN Award – Best Girl-Girl Sex Scene (with Gianna Dior) – Heat Wave
- 2023 AVN Award – Best Foursome/Orgy Scene (with Violet Myers, Vicki Chase, Vic Marie, Nicole Doshi, Savannah Bond, Anton Harden, Richard Mann, Isiah Maxwell, Jonathan Jordan, Brickzilla, Garland, Jamie Knoxx, Jay Hefner, John Legendary, Tyrone Love, Stretch, and Zaddy) – Blacked Raw V56
- 2023 XBIZ Award – Female Performer of the Year
- 2023 XBIZ Award – Best Sex Scene - Vignette (Violet Myers, Vicki Chase, Vic Marie, Nicole Doshi, Savannah Bond, Anton Harden, Richard Mann, Isiah Maxwell, Jonathan Jordan, Brickzilla, Garland, Jamie Knoxx, Jay Hefner, John Legendary, Tyrone Love, Stretch, and Zaddy) – Blacked Raw V56
- 2023 XBIZ Award – Best Sex Scene - All-Sex (with Seth Gamble) – Money
- 2024 XBIZ Award – Female Performer of the Year
- 2024 XBIZ Award – Performer Showcase of the Year – Influence: Vanna Bardot
- 2024 XBIZ Award – Feature Movie of the Year – Influence: Vanna Bardot
- 2024 AVN Award – Female Performer of the Year
- 2024 AVN Award – Best Anal Sex Scene (with Maximo Garcia) – Influence: Vanna Bardot
- 2024 AVN Award – Best Double Penetration Sex Scene (with Alex Jones and Dante Colle) – Influence: Vanna Bardot
- 2024 AVN Award – Best Girl-Girl Sex Scene (with Liz Jordan) – Punch
- 2024 AVN Award – Mark Stone Award for Outstanding Comedy – Influence: Vanna Bardot
- 2024 AVN Award – Best Music – Influence: Vanna Bardot
- 2024 XRCO Award – Female Performer of the Year
- 2026 XMA Award – Best Sex Scene - Virtual Reality (Duo/Trio) (with Little Dragon and Ryan Driller) – The Dark Side of Vanna Bardot and Little Dragon
- 2026 AVN Award – Best All-Girl Group Sex Scene (with Jennifer White, Anna Claire Clouds, Blake Blossom, Lilly Bell, Octavia Red, and Jewelz Blu) – Performers of the Year 2025: Lesbian Orgy
