= Jennifer White (pornographic film actress) =

American pornographic film actress

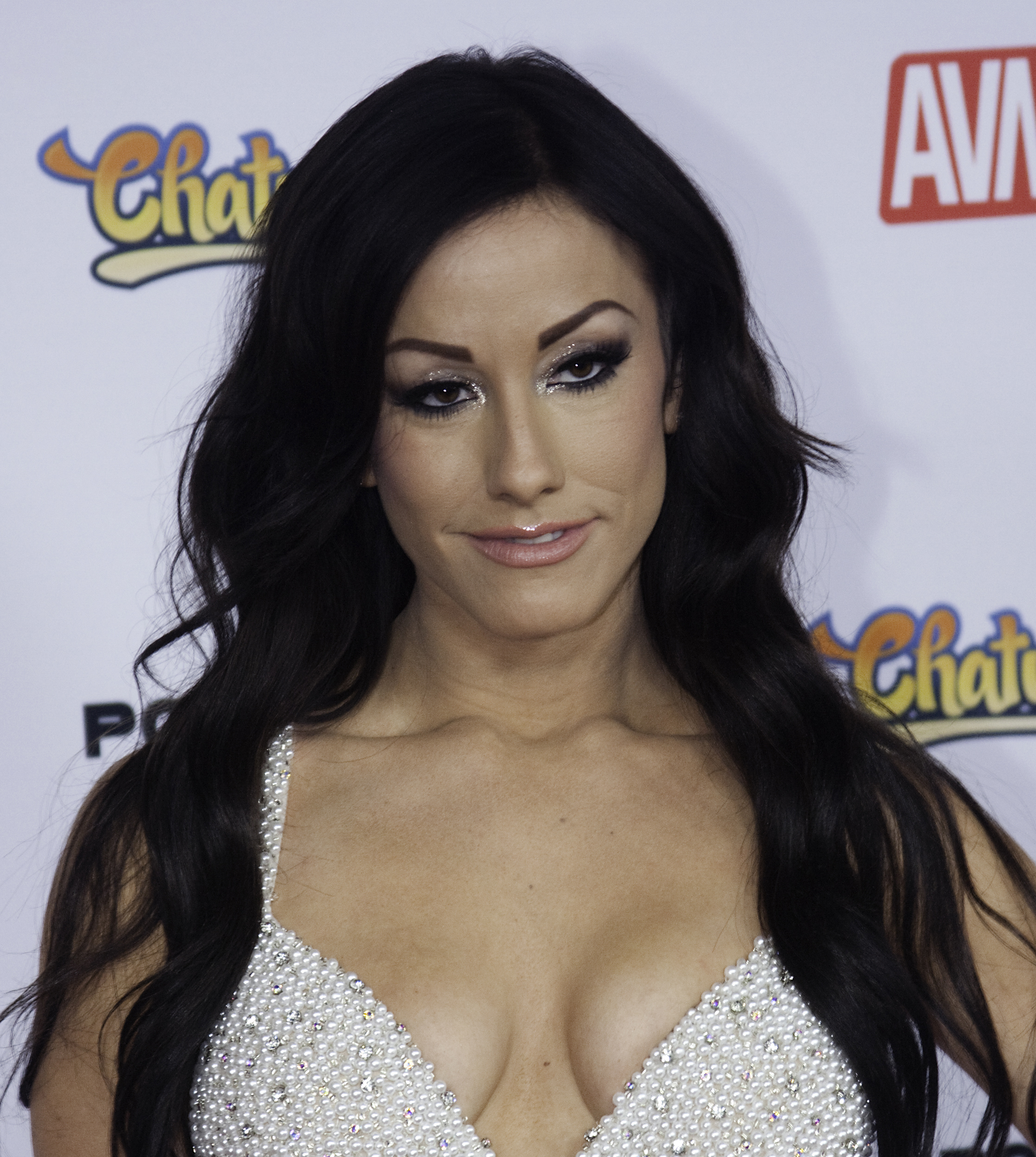
- White in 2016
- Occupation: Pornographic film actress
- Years active: 2009–present

Jennifer White is an American pornographic film actress.

A member of the adult film industry since 2009, White has won multiple awards, including the AVN Award for Female Performer of the Year and both the XMA and XRCO awards for Female Perfomer of the Year in 2026.

== Career ==
In 2025, White was the lead actress in the movie Once Upon a Time in the Valley, which was directed by Seth Gamble.

Nominated for 11 awards, White won multiple awards, including 'Female Performer of the Year' at the 43rd AVN Awards. After the awards ceremony, White spent time taking photos with fans, with The Economist stating, "In the age of AI, up-close interactions may matter more than ever." During the convention, she also performed at Sapphire Gentlemen's Club in Las Vegas. Her victory was one of three awards won by the Elegant Angel label.

White released a book, My First Time: Jennifer White's Erotic Fantasies (2018). It covered a collection of stories, which included the loss of her virginity and the 'gaining of her sexuality' as she entered the adult film industry.

== Personal life ==
White is a native of San Antonio, Texas.

== Awards ==
- 2023 Urban X Award – Best All Sex Release – Deep Inside Jennifer White
- 2023 Felshbot Award – Best Group Sex Scene (with Richard Mann, Rob Piper, Alex Jones, Jax Slayher, Lawson Jones, Dan Damage, Musa Phoenix, & Hollywood Cash) – Deep Inside Jennifer White
- 2023 Adult Empire Award – Movie of the Year – Deep Inside Jennifer White
- 2024 XRCO Award – Best Star Showcase – Deep Inside Jennifer White
- 2025 XMA Award – Best Sex Scene - Vignette (with Kendra Sunderland & Jason Luv) – Negotiation
- 2025 Adult Empire Award – Star Showcase of the Year – Hollywood Whore: A Jennifer White Showcase Film
- 2026 XMA Award – Female Performer of the Year
- 2026 XMA Award – Best Performer Showcase – Hollywood Whore: A Jennifer White Showcase Film
- 2026 AVN Award – Female Performer of the Year
- 2026 AVN Award – Best Star Showcase – Hollywood Whore: A Jennifer White Showcase Film
- 2026 AVN Award – Best All-Girl Group Sex Scene (with Anna Claire Clouds, Vanna Bardot, Blake Blossom, Lilly Bell, Octavia Red, & Jewelz Blu) – Performers of the Year 2025: Lesbian Orgy
- 2026 AVN Award – Best Double Penetration Sex Scene (with Seth Gamble & Vince Karter) – Hollywood Whore: A Jennifer White Showcase Film
- 2026 AVN Award – Best Airtight/Gangbang Scene (with Vince Karter, Jax Slayher, Seth Gamble, Lexington Steele, Alex Jones, Hollywood Cash, Mannie Coco, Milan Ponjevic, Charles Dera, Victor Ray, Chocolate God, Slim Poke, Scotty P, Nade Nasty, Donny Sins, Damon Dice, Musa Phoenix, Derek Savage, & Eddie Jay) – Hollywood Whore: A Jennifer White Showcase Film
- 2026 XRCO Award – Female Performer of the Year
- 2026 XRCO Award – Star Showcase – Hollywood Whore: A Jennifer White Showcase Film
- 2026 XRCO Award – Awesome Analist
- 2026 Urban X Award – Best Female Performer (tied with Ameena Green)
- 2026 NightMoves Award – Best Female Performer
