= Anna Claire Clouds =

American pornographic film actress (born 1995)

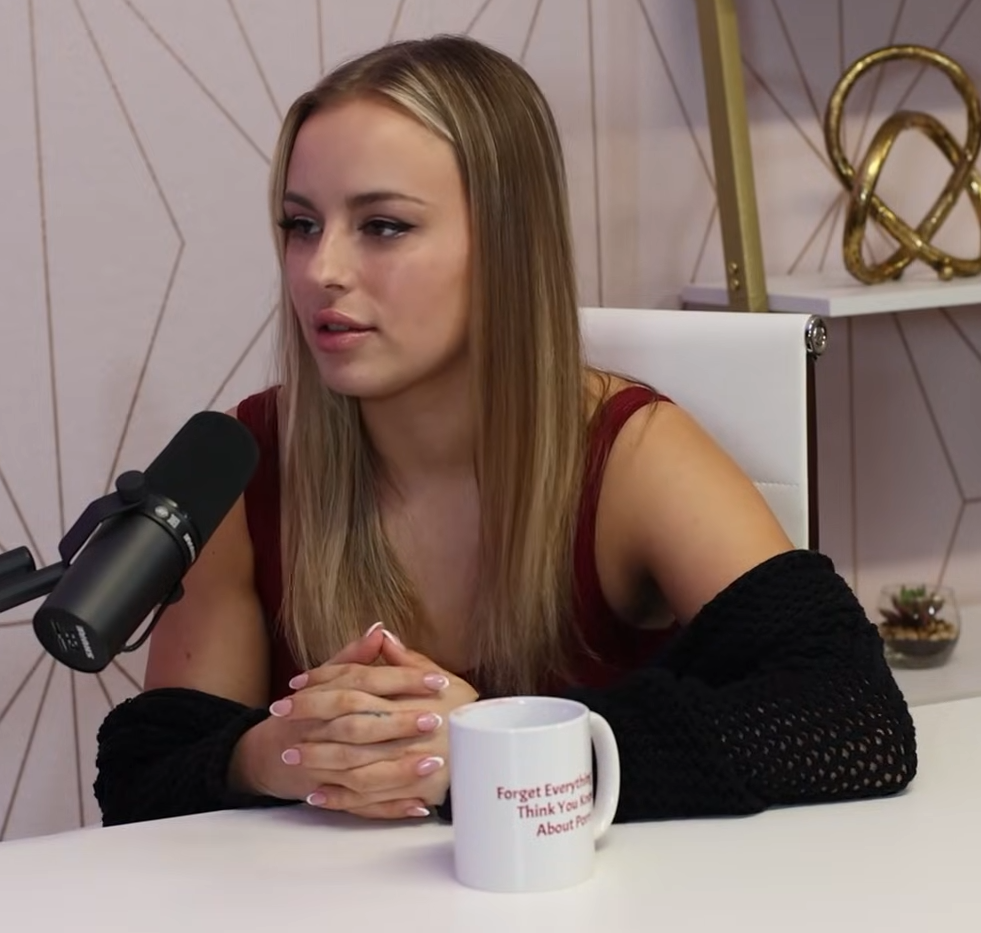
- Clouds in 2023
- Born: February 15, 1995 (age 31)
- Occupation: Pornographic film actress
- Years active: 2019–present

Anna Claire Clouds (born February 15, 1995) is an American pornographic film actress. Starting her career in pornography in 2019, in 2025 she won both the AVN Award for Female Performer of the Year and the XMA Award for Female Performer of the Year.

== Biography ==
Anna Claire Clouds was born on February 15, 1995, and grew up in a small town near Nashville, Tennessee. She started as a go-go dancer at local musical festivals, and also worked as a model and stripper as well as appearing in country music videos, such as Lucas Hoge's 2017 "Boom Boom", with her career starting when she was 18. At the same time she was studying music business and psychology at Middle Tennessee State University.

In her twenties, she left her home town for Colorado and started exploring online sex work, such as OnlyFans. She won the AVN Award for Female Performer of the Year in 2025, in a year where she produced a large quantity of films.

Clouds eventually moved to Las Vegas, where in 2020 she decided to pursue a career in studio pornography. She now lives in Los Angeles. In 2025, she became engaged to her long-term boyfriend, Quinn.

== Awards ==
- 2019 Inked Award – Camgirl of the Year
- 2023 AVN Award – Best POV Sex Scene (with Manuel Ferrara) – Manuel's Fucking POV 14
- 2023 AVN Award – Best Three-Way Sex Scene (with Jazmin Luv & Anton Harden) – Let's All Be Friends
- 2024 XBIZ Award – Best Sex Scene - Featurette (with Codey Steele) – Polar Opposites
- 2024 XRCO Award – Girl/Girl Performer of the Year
- 2024 Adult Empire Award – Porn Clip of the Year – Anna Claire Clouds: Dark Side
- 2025 XMA Award – Female Performer of the Year
- 2025 XMA Award – Best Sex Scene - Performer Showcase (with Hollywood Cash, Damon Dice, Chocolate God, Vince Karter, Nade Nasty, Slim Poke, Milan Ponjevic, Jax Slayher, & John Strong) – Anna Claire Clouds: Dark Side
- 2025 AVN Award – Female Performer of the Year
- 2025 AVN Award – Best Anal Sex Scene (with Zac Wild) – Massive Asses 13
- 2025 AVN Award – Best Gangbang Scene (with Hollywood Cash, Damon Dice, Chocolate God, Vince Karter, Nade Nasty, Slim Poke, Milan Ponjevic, Jax Slayher, & John Strong) – Anna Claire Clouds: Dark Side
- 2025 AVN Award – Best Solo/Tease Performance – Anna Claire Clouds: Dark Side
- 2025 Pornhub Award – Top DP Performer
- 2025 XRCO Award – Girl/Girl Performer of the Year
- 2026 XMA Award – Best Sex Scene - All-Sex (with Mazee the Goat & Ricky Johnson) – Cloudy with a Chance of DP
- 2026 XMA Award – Best Sex Scene - Comedy Movie (with Mikey Star, Scott Nails, & Van Wylde) – The Holdup
- 2026 AVN Award – Best All-Girl Group Sex Scene (with Jennifer White, Vanna Bardot, Blake Blossom, Lilly Bell, Octavia Red, & Jewelz Blu) – Performers of the Year 2025: Lesbian Orgy
- 2026 AVN Award – Best Foursome/Orgy Scene (with Myra Moans, Octavia Red, Scarlett Alexis, & Ryan Driller) – Overload Act 3
