= Sinatra Monroe =

American pornographic actress (born 1996)

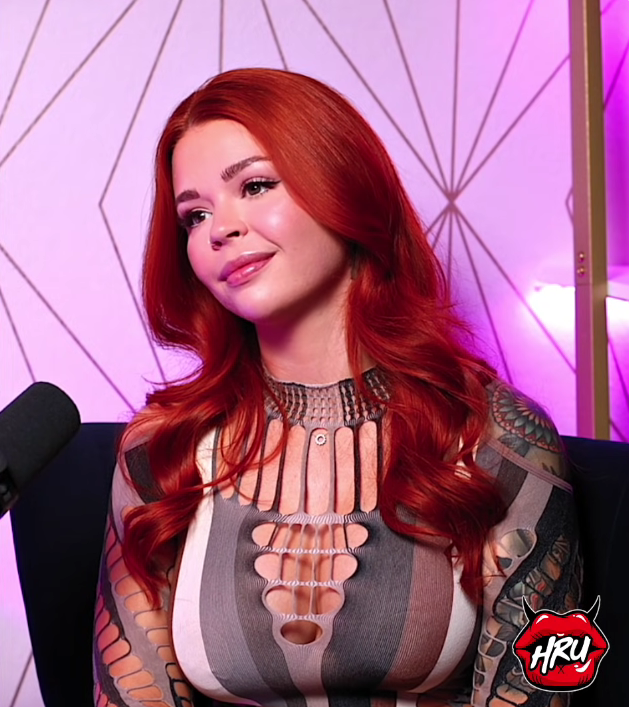
- Born: June 20, 1996 (age 30); Tampa, Florida, U.S.
- Occupations: Porn actress; OnlyFans model

Sinatra Monroe (born 1996) is an American porn actress and OnlyFans model.

== Life and career ==
Sinatra Monroe was born on June 20, 1996, in Tampa, Florida, USA. She began her career in the adult film industry in 2023 at the age of about 27. Her first shoots were for Brazzers. She then began working with Mark Spiegel. Before her career in pornography, she worked as a stripper in clubs, earning up to $30,000.

Her stage name is a combination of the last names of singer Frank Sinatra and actress Marilyn Monroe. The actress explains that she chose it as a tribute to mid-20th-century Hollywood aesthetics and as a way to express the two sides of her personality — the creative and the sensual.

As of 2023, she had 400,000 followers on TikTok and Instagram.

She admitted that she had cheated on all of her boyfriends in relationships because she was unable to be monogamous. She resolved the issue by transitioning to open relationships and making it clear to her partners from the start that she was polyamorous.

In April 2024, she was named “Model of the Month” on the Twistys website. In 2025, Sinatra appeared in several projects for major studios. She played the lead role in the first episode of the erotic thriller "Once Upon a Time in the Valley", directed by Seth Gamble. She also appeared in the film "Sexual Icons 4" for Hard X and in a scene for Blacked Raw (part of the Vixen Media Group), which was included in the monthly “Best of March” list on the Vixen Plus streaming service.

== Awards and nominations ==
Year	Award	Category	Work	Result
2024	AVN Awards	Fan Award: Favorite Indie Creator	—	Nominated
2024	XMA Fan Awards	Favorite New Performer	—	Nominated
2025	AVN Awards	Best New Starlet	—	Nominated
2025	AVN Awards	Best Tag-Team Sex Scene	Doubling Up On The Studying Slut (2024)	Nominated
2025	AVN Awards	Best Three-Way Sex Scene	Gangster - Decision 3 (2025)	Nominated
2026	AVN Awards	Best Supporting Actress	Once Upon A Time In The Valley 1 (2025)	Nominated
2026	AVN Awards	Best Supporting Actress	Single Minded (2024)	Nominated
2026	AVN Awards	Best Three-Way Sex Scene	Gangster - Decision 3 (2025)	Nominated
2026	XMA Awards	Best New Performer	—	Nominated
2026	XMA Awards	Best Sex Scene – Comedy Release	Single Minded (2024)	Nominated
