= Lexi Luna =

American pornographic film actress (born 1988/1989)

- Born: 1988 or 1989 (age 37–38)
- Occupations: Pornographic film actress; educator
- Years active: 2016–present

Lexi Luna (born 1988 or 1989) is an American pornographic film actress and former educator.

Luna joined the adult film industry in 2016, being frequently described as a 'MILF' and winning multiple awards.

== Early and personal life ==
Before entering the adult film industry, Luna was an elementary school teacher for kindergarten through fourth grade. She had previously lived in Indianapolis and later Florida. She stated that the job left her dissatisfied with the low salary and socially isolated. During that time, she joined the online fetish blog FetLife.

As of 2026, she lived in Las Vegas.

== Career ==
Luna entered the adult film industry in Florida in 2016, where she was living at the time. She then left her job and moved to California to enter the adult film industry full-time. She was 25 when entering the industry.

In the wake of the 2023 Hawaii wildfires, Luna hosted a feature show on CamSoda to raise funds for wildfire victims. She became an ambassador for Adult Time alongside other adult film actresses such as Lauren Phillips, Siri Dahl, and Leana Lovings.

In her personal OnlyFans account, she charged US$100 per minute of video from her, using her iPhone to film.

She has been selected for multiple awards, including a NightMoves Award, Pornhub Award, XRCO Award, and an AVN Award.

== Awards ==
- 2017 NightMoves Award – Miss Congeniality
- 2025 Pornhub Award – Favorite MILF
- 2025 XRCO Award – MILF of the Year
- 2026 AVN Award – MILF Performer of the Year
- 2026 Doppio Senso Night Award – Best International MILF
