= Jewelz Blu =

German pornographic film actress (born 1994/1995)

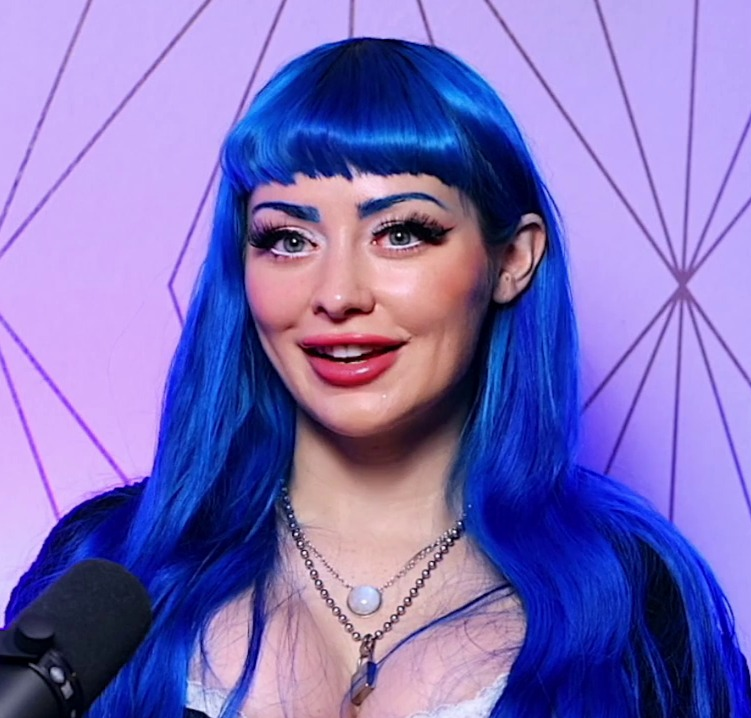
- Blu in 2025
- Born: 1994 or 1995 (age 31–32); Germany
- Occupation: Pornographic film actress
- Website: bludreamsxxx.com

Jewelz Blu (born 1994 or 1995) is a German pornographic film actress. She is best known for her distinctive blue hair.

== Career ==
Born in Germany, Blu entered the adult industry professionally in 2019 after having dabbled in camming on ManyVids. In an interview with Holly Randall, Blu stated that, while providing dominatrix and erotic massage services before entering the adult film industry, she was involved in a criminal investigation into a business associate. Blu stated she was never charged in this investigation.

Less than a year after her entrance into the adult industry, she was selected as CherryPimps' Cherry of the Month for September 2020.

In 2020, in a move away from the mainstream OnlyFans, she created her own personal website to distribute her own personal content.

She was selected as Nubile Film's Fantasy of the Month for April 2022. She won the 2022 AltPorn Award for Clip Artist of the Year.

She was selected by TeamSkeet as their All-Star for June 2023.

She was nominated for two AVN Awards in 2024. She won the 2024 Pornhub Award for Nicest Pussy.

She was nominated for the AVN Award for Female Performer of the Year in 2025. She won the 2025 XMA Award for Creator of the Year - Clips. She was nominated for two Pornhub awards in 2025, including the Most Popular Female Performer.

She won the 2026 AVN Award for Best All-Girl Group Sex Scene. She also won the 2026 Urban X Award for Best Actress.

== Personal life ==
Blu is a vegan.
