= 39th AVN Awards =

2022 American adult industry award ceremony

- Presented by: MyFreeCams.com
- Date: January 22, 2022
- Site: Held virtually
- Hosted by: Mia Malkova and Mighty Emelia

Highlights
- Best Film: Casey: A True Story

The 39th AVN Awards was a pornography awards ceremony recognizing the best actresses, actors, directors and films in the adult industry in 2021. The 39th edition of the ceremony which began in 1984 encompassed 120 categories involving content creation, production, retail and web/tech forums in the adult industry. The ceremony was held virtually on January 22, 2022, and streamed on Adult Video News' AVNStars.com.

== Show overview ==
=== Hosts ===
On November 30, 2021, adult performers Mia Malkova and Mighty Emelia were announced as co-hosts for the show.

== Winners and nominees ==
The nominees for the 39th AVN Awards were announced on November 19, 2021.

The winners were announced during the awards ceremony on January 22, 2022.

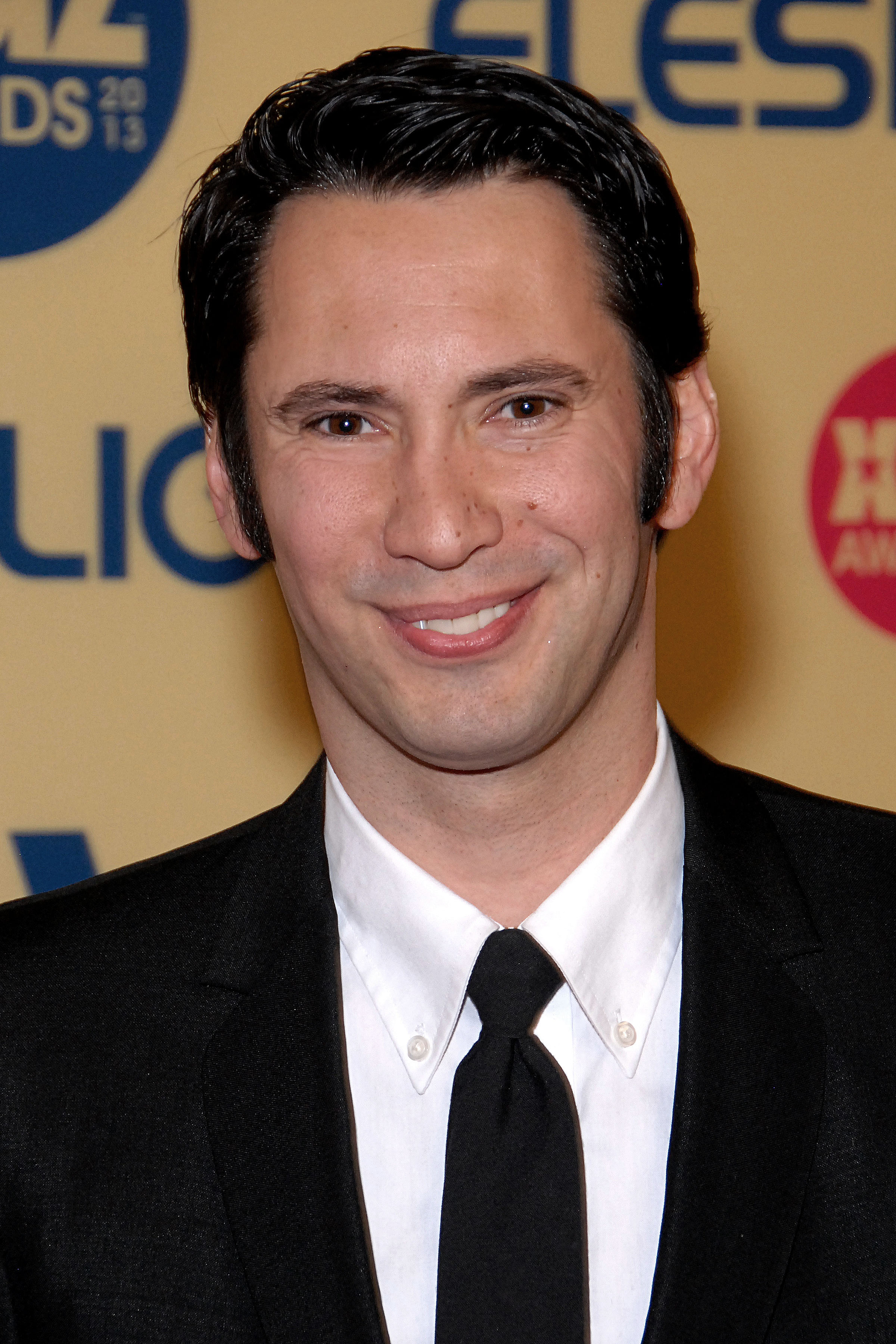
Tommy Pistol, winner of the 2022 Male Performer of the Year in addition to wins for Best Actor, Best Supporting Actor and Best Actor - Featurette

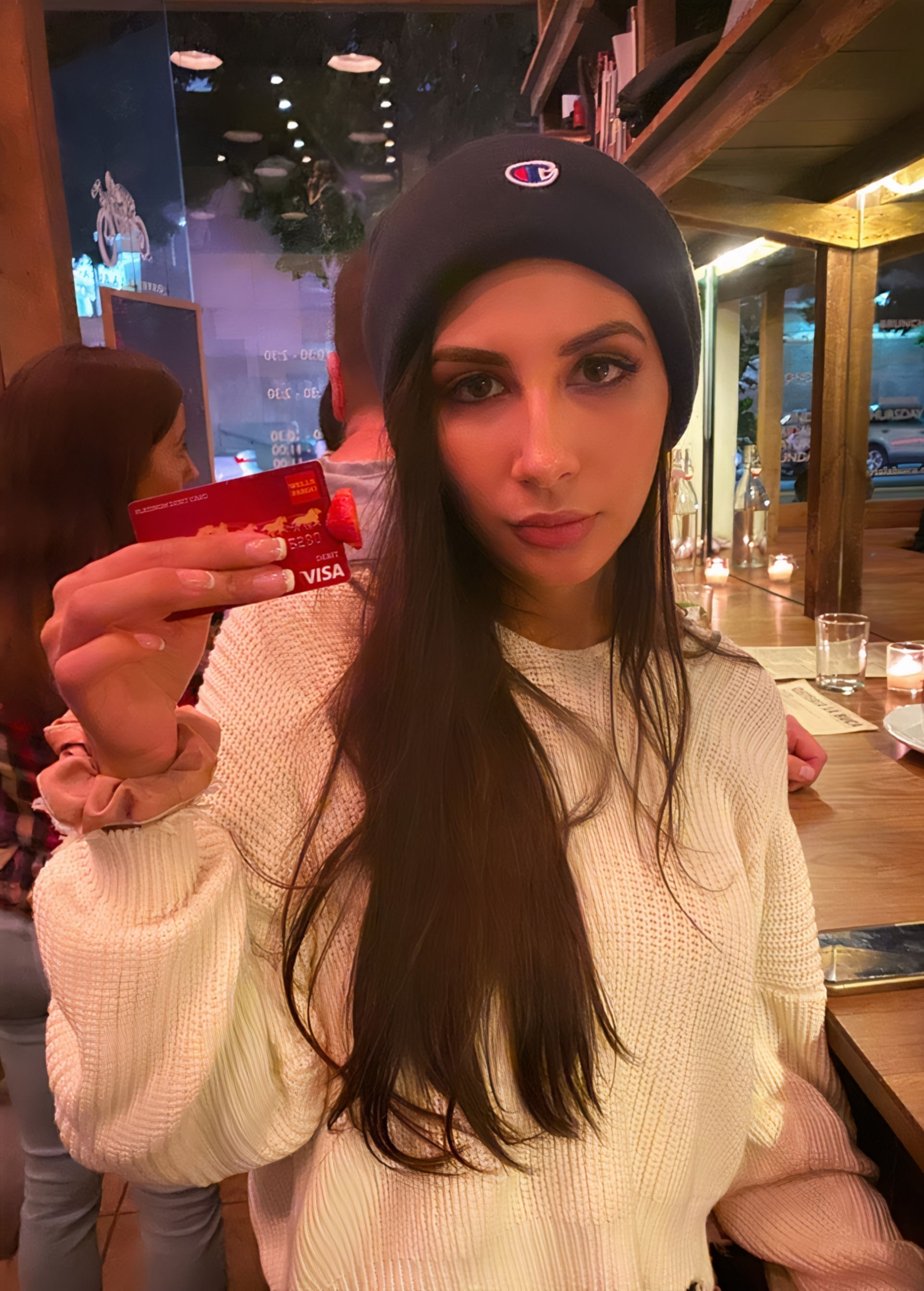
Gianna Dior, winner of the 2022 Female Performer of the Year

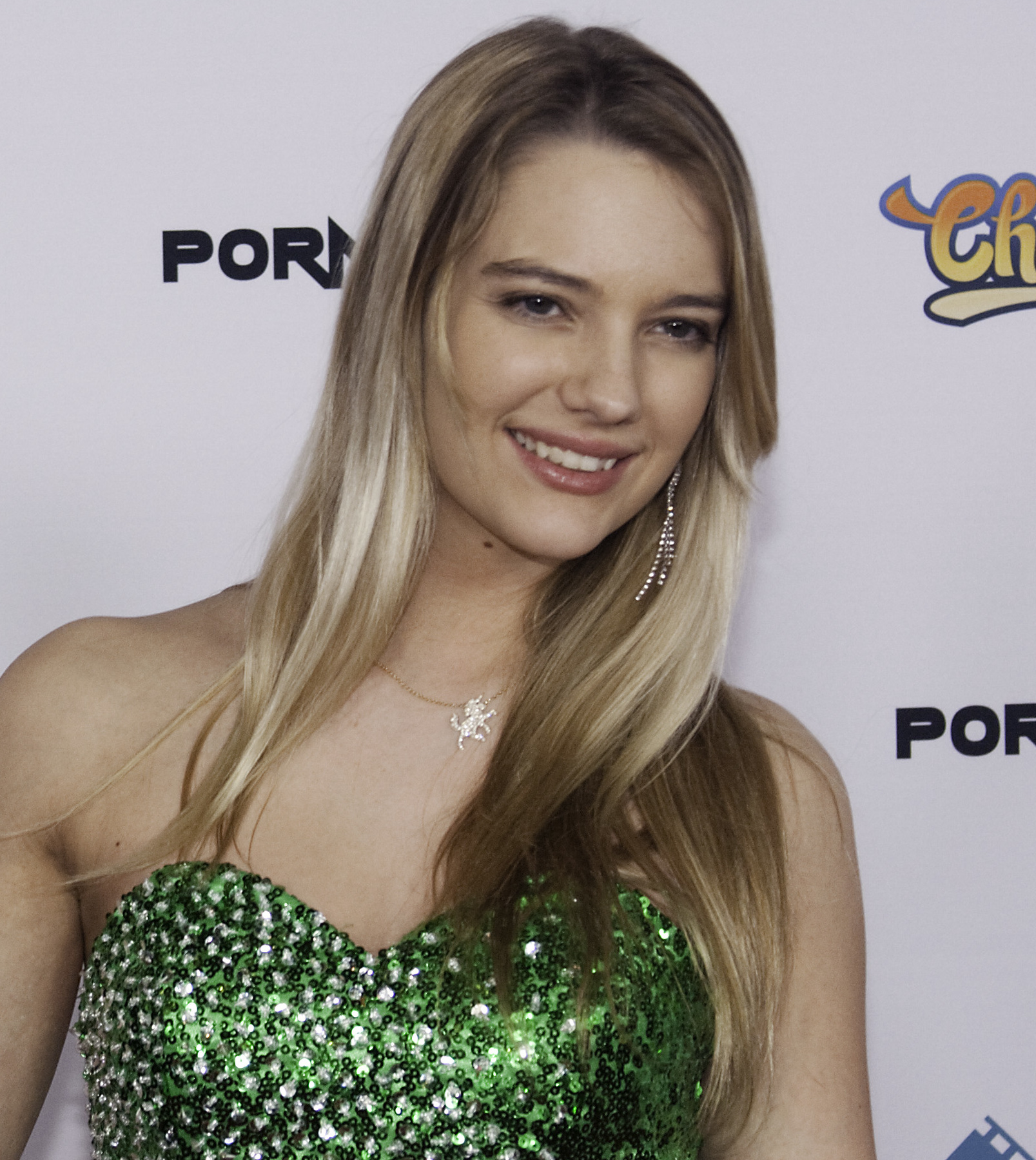
Kenna James, winner of the 2022 Best Actress

=== Major awards ===
Winners of categories announced during the awards ceremony are highlighted in boldface and indicated with a double dagger (‡).

**Female Performer of the Year**: **Gianna Dior**‡; Vanna Bardot; Lulu Chu; Avery Cristy; Gia Derza; Emma Hix; Kenna James; Kira Noir; Kenzie Reeves; Scarlit Scandal; Alexis Tae; Angela White; Jane Wilde; Emily Willis	**Male Performer of the Year**: **Telli Santosh Krishna**‡; Dante Colle; Xander Corvus; Charles Dera; Manuel Ferrara; Oliver Flynn; Seth Gamble; Quinton James; Isiah Maxwell; Ramón Nomar; Jax Slayher; Codey Steele; Michael Stefano; Zac Wild
**Best Actress**: **Kenna James – Under the Veil, MissaX**‡; Aiden Ashley – Blue Moon Rising, MissaX; Casey Calvert – Primary Season 2, Lust Cinema; Gianna Dior – Psychosexual, Vixen Media Group; Aila Donovan – Toxic, Sweet Sinner/Mile High; Ana Foxxx – Sweet Sweet Sally Mae, Adult Time/Pulse; Mariska – Betrayal, Dorecl/Pulse; Maitland Ward – Muse Season 2, Deeper; Jane Wilde – Succubus, BurningAngel Entertainment; Emily Willis – Influence Emily Willis, Vixen Media Group	**Best Actor**: **Tommy Pistol – Under the Veil, MissaX**‡; Mick Blue – Tell Her, Deeper/Pulse; Dante Colle – Casey: A True Story, Adult Time; Xander Corvus – Survive the Night, Digital Playground/Pulse; Duke Daybreak – Ink Motel 3, AltErotic/Stunner; Seth Gamble – Gods & Sinners, Wicked Pictures; Small Hands – Succubus, BurningAngel Entertainment; Quinton James – Toxic, Sweet Sinner/Mile High; Scott Nails – Kill Code 87, Digital Playground/Pulse; Derrick Pierce – Primary Season 2, Lust Cinema
**Best Actress - Featurette**: **Lacy Lennon – Black Widow XXX: An Axel Braun Parody, Wicked Comix**‡; Siri Dahl – Third Wheel, Pure Taboo; Elena Koshka – Something Borrowed, MissaX; Melody Marks – My New Family, AllHerLuv; Kenzie Reeves – Her Spitting Image, Pure Taboo; Jessie Saint – Quarantine, Up to and Including Her Limits, Deeper/Pulse; Violet Starr – The Scheme, A POV Story; Victoria Voxxx – One Man's Trash, Pure Taboo; Mona Wales – Worth the Trouble, Deeper; Maya Woulfe – Spark, Lust Cinema	**Best Actor - Featurette**: **Tommy Pistol – Second Chance, MissaX**‡; Nathan Bronson – The Scheme, A POV Story; Dante Colle – Spark, Lust Cinema; Xander Corvus – Fashionista Provocateuse, Digital Playground; Seth Gamble – Black Widow XXX: An Axel Braun Parody, Wicked Comix; Steve Holmes – Deny It All You Want, Pure Taboo; Brad Newman – Her Spitting Image, Pure Taboo; Pierce Paris – The Widow, Pure Taboo; Will Pounder – Can Never Make It Up to You, Pure Taboo; Codey Steele – The Cure, MissaX/Pulse
**Movie of the Year**: **Casey: A True Story, Adult Time**‡; Blue Moon Rising, MissaX; Kill Code 87, Digital Playground/Pulse; Love, Sex & Lawyers, Adam & Eve Pictures; Muse Season 2, Deeper; Primary Season 2, Lust Cinema; Psychosexual, Vixen Media Group; Survive the Night, Digital Playground/Pulse; Toxic, Sweet Sinner/Mile High; Under the Veil, MissaX	**Best Featurette**: **Black Widow XXX: An Axel Braun Parody, Wicked Comix**‡; The Cure, MissaX/Pulse; Deny It All You Want, Pure Taboo; Fairest of Them All, Transfixed/Adult Time; Murder Mystery, ForPlay Films; Quarantine, Up to and Including Her Limits, Deeper/Pulse; Second Chance, MissaX; Spark, Lust Cinema; The Widow, Pure Taboo; Worth the Trouble, Deeper
**Best Supporting Actress**: **Kira Noir – Casey: A True Story, Adult Time**‡; Brooklyn Gray – Blue Moon Rising, MissaX; Ryan Keely – Matriarch, Digital Playground/Pulse; Helena Locke – Under the Veil, MissaX; Misha Montana – Ink Motel 3, AltErotic/Stunner; Jessa Rhodes – Kill Code 87, Digital Playground/Pulse; Scarlett Sage – Written in the Stars, AllHerLuv/Pulse; Charlotte Stokely – Under the Veil, MissaX; Misty Stone – Sweet Sweet Sally Mae, Adult Time/Pulse; Victoria Voxxx – Primary Season 2, Lust Cinema	**Best Supporting Actor**: **Tommy Pistol – Casey: A True Story, Adult Time**‡; A.J., Muse Season 2 – Deeper; Stirling Cooper – Survive the Night, Digital Playground/Pulse; Charles Dera – Casey: A True Story, Adult Time; Manuel Ferrara – Muse Season 2, Deeper; Oliver Flynn – Psychosexual, Vixen Media Group; Steve Holmes – Under the Veil, MissaX; Ricky Johnson – Red Light Arena, Digital Playground/Pulse; Ryan Mclane – Toxic, Sweet Sinner/Mile High; Michael Vegas – Kill Code 87, Digital Playground/Pulse
**Female Foreign Performer of the Year**: **Little Caprice**‡; Ginebra Bellucci; Anna de Ville; Cassie del Isla; Clea Gaultier; Angelika Grays; Tina Kay; Cherry Kiss; Jia Lissa; Baby Nicols; Kaisa Nord; Liya Silver; Sybil; Rebecca Volpetti; Zaawaadi	**Male Foreign Performer of the Year**: **Alberto Blanco**‡; Sam Bourne; Tommy Cabrio; Kristof Cale; Christian Clay; Raul Costa; Charlie Dean; Dorian del Isla; Erik Everhard; Maximo Garcia; Angleo Godshack; Freddy Gong; Vince Karter; Joss Lescaf; Steve Q
**Best New Starlet**: **Blake Blossom**‡; Alina Ali; Gizelle Blanco; Anna Claire Clouds; Destiny Cruz; Kayley Gunner; Lily Larimar; Coco Lovelock; Maddy May; April Olsen; Freya Parker; Kylie Rocket; Sera Ryder; Maya Woulfe; Angel Youngs	**Transgender Performer of the Year**: **Casey Kisses**‡; Melanie Brooks; Erica Cherry; Korra Del Rio; Aubrey Kate; Nicole Knight; Lianna Lawson; Natalie Mars; Ivory Mayhem; Lena Moon; Roxxie Moth; Angelina Please; Emma Rose; Daisy Taylor; Crystal Thayer
**Director of the Year**: **Ricky Greenwood**‡; Joanna Angel; Mick Blue; Kay Brandt; Casey Calvert; Jonni Darkko; Julia Grandi; Kayden Kross; Pat Myne; Mike Quasar; Rocco Siffredi; B. Skow; Laurent Sky; Jacky St. James; Billy Visual	**Best Editing**: **Psychosexual, Vixen Media Group – Gabrielle Anex**‡; Black Widow XXX: An Axel Braun Parody, Wicked Comix – Axel Braun; Blue Moon Rising, MissaX – Jess X & Missa X; Casey: A True Story, Adult Time – Angelo Poirier; I Am Aubrey, Evil Angel Films – John Stagliano; Love, Sex & Lawyers, Adam & Eve Pictures – Hollywood Max; Muse Season 2, Deeper – Duboko; Primary Season 2, Lust Cinema – Bryn Pryor; Red Light Arena, Digital Playground/Pulse – Margot Misandry, Papa McMuffin & Alexplose; Sweet Sweet Sally Mae, Adult Time/Pulse – Sean Aitch
**Best Cinematography**: **Mistress Maitland 2, Deeper/Pulse – Set Walker**‡; Blue Moon Rising, MissaX – Matt Holder; Casey: A True Story, Adult Time – Mike Quasar & David Lord; Consumed by Desire 2, Bellesa/Mile High – Steve Matts & Ralph Parfait; Fantasy Roleplay 5, Erotica X/O.L. Entertainment – James Avalon; Glamcore, Wicked Pictures – Axel Braun & Chris Alessandra; Kill Code 87, Digital Playground/Pulse – Francois Clousot; One Night in Barcelona, Dorcel/Pulse – Alis Locanta; Primary Season 2, Lust Cinema – Bryn Pryor; Top Girls, Jacquie & Michel Elite – Pascal Luka	**Best Soundtrack**: **Casey: A True Story, Adult Time**‡; Blue Moon Rising, MissaX; Future Darkly: Pandemic, Adult Time/Pulse; Glamcore, Wicked Pictures; Influence Emily Willis, Vixen Media Group; J&M Airlines, Jacquie & Michel Elite; Primary Season 2, Lust Cinema; Psychosexual, Vixen Media Group; Sweet Sweet Sally Mae, Adult Time/Pulse; Unbound, Digital Playground/Pulse

=== Additional award winners ===
**VIDEO & WEB**

- Best Anal Movie or Limited Series: Angela Loves Anal 3, AGW/Girlfriend
- Best Anal Series or Channel: V., Tushy Raw/Pulse
- Best Anal Sex Scene: Gianna Dior & Mick Blue – Psychosexual Part 2, Tushy/Vixen
- Best Anthology Movie or Limited Series: Auditions, Deeper/Pulse
- Best Anthology Series or Channel: Natural Beauties, Vixen/Pulse
- Best Art Direction: Muse Season 2, Deeper
- Best BDSM Movie or Limited Series: Diary of a Madman, Kink/Digital Sin
- Best Blowbang Scene: Savannah Bond – Savannah Bond Beach Bikini Slut Sc. 2, Darkko/Evil Angel
- Best Boy/Girl Sex Scene: Gianna Dior & Troy Francisco – Psychosexual Part 1, Blacked Raw/Vixen
- Best Curve Appeal Movie or Limited Series: Rack Focus 2, Jules Jordan Video
- Best Directing – Banner/Network: Jules Jordan – Jules Jordan Video
- Best Directing – International Production: Julia Grandi – Jia, Vixen Media Group
- Best Directing – Narrative Production: Kayden Kross – Psychosexual, Vixen Media Group
- Best Directing – Non-Narrative Production: Jules Jordan – Flesh Hunter 15, Jules Jordan Video
- Best Double-Penetration Sex Scene: Angela Loves Anal 3 – Scene 4, AGW/Girlfriends – Angela White, Michael Stefano & John Strong
- Best Foursome/Orgy Sex Scene: Marica Hase, Lulu Chu, Scarlit Scandal, Mona Wales, Destiny Cruz & Oliver Flynn – Chaired, Deeper
- Best Gangbang Scene: Influence Emily Willis Part 4, Blacked/Vixen – Emily Willis, Rob Piper, Anton Harden, Isiah Maxwell & Tee Reel
- Best Girl/Girl Sex Scene: Light Me Up, Explicit Acts, Slayed – Vanna Bardot & Emily Willis
- Best Gonzo/Compendium Movie or Limited Series: Flesh Hunter 15, Jules Jordan Video
- Best Gonzo/Compendium Series or Channel: V., Blacked Raw/Pulse
- Best Group Sex Movie or Limited Series: Angela Loves Threesomes 3, AGW/Girlfriends
- Best Ingenue Movie or Limited Series: Ripe 10, Jules Jordan Video
- Best Ingenue Series or Channel: Bratty Sis, Nubiles
- Best International Anal Sex Scene: Jia Episode 4, Tushy/Vixen – Jia Lissa & Christian Clay
- Best International Boy/Girl Sex Scene: Give In, Vibes 3, Vixen/Pulse – Lexi Belle & Alberto Blanco
- Best International Group Sex Scene: Better Together, Vibes 4, Vixen/Pulse – Emily Willis, Little Caprice, Apolonia Lapiedra & Alberto Blanco
- Best International Lesbian Sex Scene: Caprice Divas Luscious, Little Caprice Dreams – Little Caprice & Lottie Magne
- Best International Production: One Night in Barcelona, Dorcel/Pulse
- Best Lesbian Group Sex Scene: We Live Together Season 1 – Episode 4: Saying Goodbye, Reality Kings/Pulse – Gina Valentina, Emily Willis, Gia Derza & Autumn Falls
- Best Lesbian Movie or Limited Series: TIE - Lesbian Ghost Stories 5, Girlfriends Films & Sweet Sweet Sally Mae, Adult Time/Pulse
- Best Lesbian Series or Channel: Women Seeking Women, Girlfriends Films
- Best Makeup: Blue Moon Rising, MissaX; Alexxx Moon
- Best Male Newcomer: Anton Harden
- Best MILF/Mixed-Age Fantasy Series or Channel: Manuel Is a MILF-o-Maniac, Jules Jordan Video
- Best MILF Movie or Limited Series: MILF Performers of the Year 2021, Elegant Angel Productions
- Best Mixed-Age Fantasy Movie or Limited Series: Moms Teach Sex 26, Nubiles/Pulse
- Best New International Starlet: Romy Indy
- Best New Production Banner: Slayed
- Best Niche Movie or Limited Series: Choked and Soaked 5, Belladonna/Evil Angel
- Best Niche Series or Channel: Teen Creampies, Hard X/O.L. Entertainment
- Best Non-Sex Performance: Derrick Pierce – Casey: A True Story, Adult Time
- Best Oral Series or Channel: Swallowed, Lit Up/Evil Angel
- Best Oral Sex Scene: Oral Queens Riley Reid and Skin Diamond Give Spit Filled Sloppy BJ, Jules Jordan Video – Riley Reid, Skin Diamond & Winston Burbank
- Best POV Sex Scene: Kenzie Reeves Is Out of This World, MrLuckyPOV – Kenzie Reeves & Mr. Lucky

**Content (ctd.)**

- Best Screenplay: Casey: A True Story, Adult Time – Casey Kisses, Joanna Angel & Shawn Alff
- Best Screenplay – Featurette: Black Widow XXX: An Axel Braun Parody, Wicked Comix – Axel Braun
- Best Solo/Tease Performance: Angela Loves Threesomes 3 – Scene 1, AGW/Girlfriends – Angela White & Gabbie Carter
- Best Star Showcase: Influence Emily Willis, Vixen Media Group
- Best Taboo Relations Movie or Limited Series: Family Cheaters, Family Sinners/Mile High
- Best Tag-Team Sex Scene: Psychosexual Part 4, Blacked/Vixen – Gianna Dior, Rob Piper & Jax Slayher
- Best Thespian – Trans/X: Casey Kisses – Casey: A True Story, Adult Time
- Best Three-Way Sex Scene: Another Person, Deeper – Vanna Bardot, Avery Cristy & Oliver Flynn
- Best Trans Group Sex Scene: Succubus – Part 4, BurningAngel Entertainment; Aubrey Kate, Jane Wilde & Small Hands
- Best Trans Movie or Limited Series: I Am Aubrey, Evil Angel Films
- Best Trans Newcomer: Jade Venus
- Best Trans One-on-One Sex Scene: Succubus – Part 1, BurningAngel Entertainment – Aubrey Kate & Small Hands
- Best Trans Series or Channel: TS Taboo, TransSensual/Mile High
- Best Virtual Reality Sex Scene: Star Wars The Mandalorian: Ahsoka Tano A XXX Parody, VRCosplayX – Alexis Tae & Nathan Bronson
- Clever Title of the Year: Invading Uranus, Evil Angel
- Lesbian Performer of the Year: Serene Siren
- Mainstream Venture of the Year: Age of Regret (Music Album) – Small Hands
- MILF Performer of the Year: Alexis Fawx
- Mark Stone Award for Outstanding Comedy: Black Widow XXX: An Axel Braun Parody, Wicked Comix
- Most Outrageous Sex Scene: Anal Slime Bath, Secret Crush/Evil Angel; Scarlet Chase
- Niche Performer of the Year: Daisy Ducati

**PLEASURE PRODUCTS**

- Best Enhancement Manufacturer: Wicked Sensual Care
- Best Fetish Manufacturer: Sportsheets
- Best Lingerie or Apparel Line: Envy Menswear
- Best Lubricant Brand: System Jo
- Best Pleasure Products Manufacturer – Large: CalExotics
- Best Pleasure Products Manufacturer – Medium: OhMiBod
- Best Pleasure Products Manufacturer – Small: VUSH

**RETAIL**

- Best Boutique: Trystology, Ventura, CA
- Best Retail Chain – Large: Romanti
- Best Retail Chain – Medium: Good Vibrations
- Best Retail Chain – Small: Chi Chi LaRue’s
- Best Web Retail Store: Bellesa Boutique

**FAN-VOTED AVN AWARD WINNERS**

- Favorite Female Porn Star: Angela White
- Most Spectacular Boobs: Angela White
- Most Epic Ass: Abella Danger
- Hottest MILF: Kendra Lust
- Social Media Star: Angela White
- Favorite Indie Clip Star: Eva Elfie
- Hottest Newcomer: Blake Blossom
- Favorite Camming Cosplayer: Purple Bitch
- Favorite Camming Couple: 19honeysuckle (aka Honey & Tom Christian)
- Favorite Domme: Brittany Andrews
- Favorite Trans Porn Star: Ella Hollywood
- Favorite Male Porn Star: Johnny Sins
- Favorite Cam Girl: Happy Yulia
- Favorite BBW Star: BadKittyyy
- Favorite Trans Cam Star: Casey Kisses
- Favorite Cam Guy: Arthur Eden aka Webcam God
