= AVN Award for Transgender Performer of the Year =

Adult entertainment industry award

- Awarded for: Transgender Performer of the Year
- Country: United States
- Presented by: AVN Media Network
- First award: 2004; 22 years ago
- Final award: 2026
- Currently held by: Aubrey Kate
- Website: avnawards.avn.com

The AVN Award for Transgender Performer of the Year (previously the AVN Award for Transsexual Performer of the Year) is presented every January in Las Vegas, Nevada at the AVN Awards ceremony. It represents the transgender pornographic film performer who has had the best body of work in the previous year. It has been given annually since 2004.

Vaniity was the first winner and first two-time winner; winning in 2004 and 2013. Bailey Jay was the first back-to-back winner; winning in 2011 and 2012. Buck Angel is the only trans man to have won the award, winning in 2007.

Initially, winners were not presented the award on stage; on-stage presentations began with the 2013 award to Vaniity. As of January 2026, the titleholder is Aubrey Kate.

== Winners and nominees ==
=== 2000s ===
Year	Photo	Winner	Nominees
2004		Vaniity	Gia Darling; Vo D'Balm; Fabiane de la Costa; Joanna Jet; Nomi X
2005		Vicki Richter	Vo D'Balm; Gia Darling; Danielle Foxxx; Joanna Jet; Fabiola Mebarek; Vaniity
2006		Gia Darling	Joanna Jet; Vicki Richter; Wendy Williams
2007		Buck Angel	Gia Darling; Danielle Foxxx; Joanna Jet; Allanah Starr; Holly Sweet; Vaniity; Wendy Williams
2008		Allanah Starr	Buck Angel; Khloe Hart; Sexy Jade; Kourtney; Yasmin Lee; Carla Novaes; Thays Schiavinato; Vaniity; Vicki Richter; Wendy Williams
2009		Wendy Williams	Buck Angel; Brittany Coxxx; Natassia Dreams; Jesse Flores; Foxxy; Jessica Host; Yasmine Lee; Vicki Richter; Holly Sweet

=== 2010s ===
Year	Photo	Winner	Nominees
2010		Kimber James	Buck Angel; Celeste (IV) (Trans); Sexy Jade; Jesse; Joanna Jet; Olivia Love; Anna Paula Samadat; Hazel Tucker; Wendy Williams
2011		Bailey Jay	Morgan Bailey; Hera C Celeste; Natalia Coxxx; Amy Daly; Jesse Flores; Foxxy; Mia Isabella; Kimber James; Hazel Tucker; Wendy Williams
2012		Bailey Jay	Celeste; Amy Daly; Morgan Bailey; Jesse Flores; Mia Isabella; Joanna Jet; Yasmin Lee; Madison Montag; Domino Presley; Aly Sinclair; Brittany St. Jordan; Juliette Stray; Hazel Tucker; Wendy Williams
2013		Vaniity	Celeste; Amy Daly; Danni Daniels; Jessica Fox; Joanna Jet; Eva Lin; Venus Lux; Sunshyne Monroe; Aly Sinclair; Brittany St. Jordan; Tiffany Starr; Wendy Summers; Sarina Valentina; Wendy Williams
2014		Eva Lin	Buck Angel; Natassia Dreams; Danika Dreamz; Jesse Flores; Jessica Fox; Foxxy; Kelli Lox; Venus Lux; Jane Marie; Carmen Moore; Tiffany Starr; Wendy Summers; Sarina Valentina; Vaniity
2015		Venus Lux	Jonelle Brooks; Chanel Couture; James Darling; Jessy Dubai; Foxxy; Khloe Hart; Kelly Klaymour; Eva Lin; Kelli Lox; Chelsea Poe; Tyra Scott; Tiffany Starr; Vaniity; Wendy Williams
2016		Venus Lux	Jonelle Brooks; Delia DeLions; Jessy Dubai; Foxxy; Vixxen Goddess; Sienna Grace; Khloe Hart; Aubrey Kate; Kelli Lox; Kylie Maria; Carla Novaes; Holly Parker; Chelsea Poe; Tyra Scott
2017		Aubrey Kate	Michelle Austin; Aspen Brooks; Jessy Dubai; Jessica Fox; Foxxy; Nina Lawless; Kelli Lox; Venus Lux; Chelsea Marie; Sunshyne Monroe; Chelsea Poe; Domino Presley; Isabella Sorrenti; Stefani Special
2018		Aubrey Kate	Foxxy; Dicky Johnson; Casey Kisses; Venus Lux; Natalie Mars; Tori Mayes; Marissa Minx; Mandy Mitchell; Sunshyne Monroe; Chanel Santini; Alexa Scout; Stefani Special; Shiri Trap; Freya Wynn
2019		Chanel Santini	Shiri Allwood; Michelle Austin; Aspen Brooks; Kayleigh Coxx; Korra Del Rio; Foxxy; Aubrey Kate; Khloe Kay; Lena Kelly; Casey Kisses; Annabelle Lane; Natalie Mars; Domino Presley; Tyler St. Syn

=== 2020s ===
Year	Photo	Winner	Nominees
2020		Natalie Mars	Shiri Allwood; Kayleigh Coxx; Korra del Rio; Ella Hollywood; Aubrey Kate; Khloe Kay; Lena Kelly; Casey Kisses; Lianna Lawson; Chelsea Marie; Marissa Minx; Ryder Monroe; Chanel Santini; Daisy Taylor
2021		Aubrey Kate	Shiri Allwood; Aspen Brooks; Kayleigh Coxx; Korra Del Rio; Natassia Dreams; Foxxy; Jenna Gargles; Ella Hollywood; Khloe Kay; Casey Kisses; Natalie Mars; Ryder Monroe; Lena Moon; Daisy Taylor
2022		Casey Kisses	Melanie Brooks; Erica Cherry; Korra Del Rio; Aubrey Kate; Nicole Knight; Lianna Lawson; Natalie Mars; Ivory Mayhem; Lena Moon; Roxxie Moth; Angelina Please; Emma Rose; Daisy Taylor; Crystal Thayer
2023		Emma Rose	Janie Blade; Erica Cherry; Korra Del Rio; Ariel Demure; Jessy Dubai; Khloe Kay; Kasey Kei; Pixi Lust; Cherry Mavrik; Eva Maxim; Lola Morena; Crystal Thayer; Jade Venus; Izzy Wilde
2024		Emma Rose	Valeria Atreides; Zariah Aura; Asia Belle; Erica Cherry; Ariel Demure; Tori Easton; Gracie Jane; Brittney Kade; Kasey Kei; Eva Maxim; Lola Morena; Daisy Taylor; Jade Venus; Izzy Wilde
2025		Brittney Kade	Zariah Aura; Ariel Demure; Ember Fiera; Angellica Good; Gracie Jane; Kasey Kei; Leilani Li; Eva Maxim; Lola Morena; Eros Orisha; Amanda Riley; Emma Rose; Jade Venus; Izzy Wilde
2026		Aubrey Kate	Zariah Aura; Ariel Demure; Victoria Grant; Brittney Kade; Aubrey Kate; Kasey Kei; Leilani Li; Blake Lovely; Avery Lust; Eva Maxim; Lola Morena; Andylynn Payne; Autumn Rain; Grazyeli Silva; Jade Venus

== See also ==
- AVN Award for Male Performer of the Year
- AVN Award for Female Performer of the Year
- AVN Award for Male Foreign Performer of the Year
