= Mia Isabella =

American pornographic film actress (born 1985/1986)

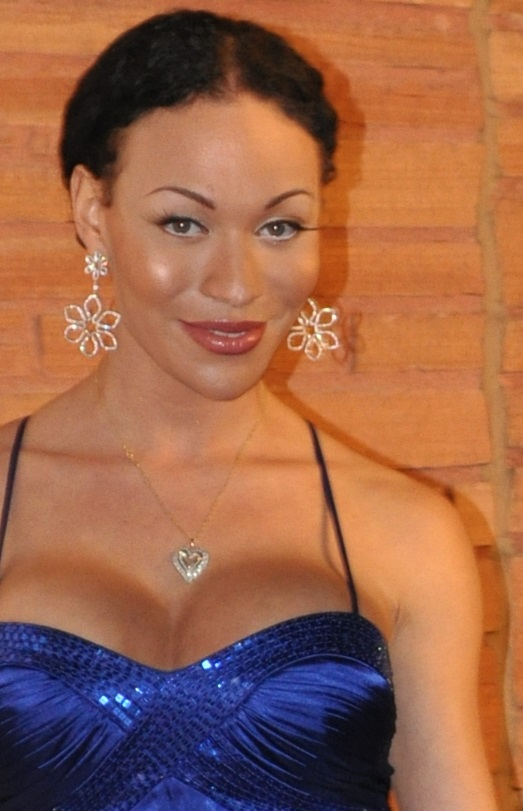
- Isabella in 2011
- Born: 1985 or 1986 (age 40–41); Chicago, Illinois, U.S.
- Occupation: Pornographic film actress
- Website: mia-isabella.com

Mia Isabella (born 1985 or 1986) is an American transgender retired pornographic film actress.

== Early life ==
Isabella was born in Chicago, but mostly grew up in Tennessee before returning to Chicago as a teenager. She told Vice magazine that she played the violin for least two hours daily between the ages of 8 and 18. She graduated from high school at 16 years old, attended the Art Institute of Chicago, and owned a luxury designer boutique. She has a fashion degree from Paris Fashion Institute.

== Career ==
Isabella entered the adult film industry in 2005 at the age of 19 and did her first scene with Yasmin Lee and Kayla Coxxx in T-Girls 3 for Anabolic Video. She took a hiatus from porn when she was 21 years old and returned at age 23. In January 2014, she retired from porn.

== Mainstream media appearances ==
In 2013, Isabella voiced a character known as "Prostitute #1" in the video game Grand Theft Auto V. She was also among the pornographic actresses who appeared in the welcome home party scene for Jax Teller after his release from prison in the Season 7 premiere of Sons of Anarchy, which aired on September 9, 2014.

== Personal life ==
Isabella got married when she was 20 years old and the marriage lasted four years. At age 22, she underwent facial feminization surgery which consisted of chin, jawline, and nasal bone reduction and a mid and upper facelift. She also underwent a second breast augmentation surgery. In September 2010, she had a rhinoplasty, her chin shaved down, cheek implants, another mid and upper facelift, and her right breast corrected, which did not properly heal in her previous surgery.

Celebrity gossip sites publicized sexting messages in 2015 that alluded to a sexual relationship between Isabella and the rapper Tyga while the latter was dating Kylie Jenner. Tyga denied the alleged relationship happened.

== Awards and nominations ==
Year	Ceremony	Result	Category	Work
2010	Urban X Award	Nominated	Best Ethnic Transsexual Site	Mia-Isabella.com
2011	AVN Award	Nominated	Best Alternative Web Site	Mia-Isabella.com
2011	AVN Award	Nominated	Transsexual Performer of the Year	—N/a
2011	Urban X Award	Won	Transsexual Performer of the Year	—N/a
2011	XBIZ Award	Won	Transsexual Performer of the Year	—N/a
2012	AVN Award	Nominated	Transsexual Performer of the Year	—N/a
2012	AVN Award	Nominated	Best Alternative Website	Mia-Isabella.com
2012	NightMoves Award	Won	Best Transsexual Performer (Editor's Choice)	—N/a
2012	XBIZ Award	Nominated	Transsexual Performer of the Year	—N/a
2012	XBIZ Award	Nominated	Transsexual Site of the Year	Mia-Isabella.com
2013	XBIZ Award	Nominated	Transsexual Site of the Year	Mia-Isabella.com
2014	XBIZ Award	Nominated	Transsexual Site of the Year	Mia-Isabella.com
