= AVN Awards =

Adult entertainment industry award

- Current: 43rd AVN Awards
- Sponsored by: Adult Video News
- Location: Las Vegas, Nevada
- Country: United States
- Presented by: MyFreeCams
- Reward: Trophy
- First award: 1984; 42 years ago
- Final award: Present
- Website: avn.com/awards/winners

Television/radio coverage
- Network: Playboy TV (1998–2007); Showtime (United States) (since 2008); The Movie Network and Movie Central (Canada)

Most recent AVN Award winners
- 2026
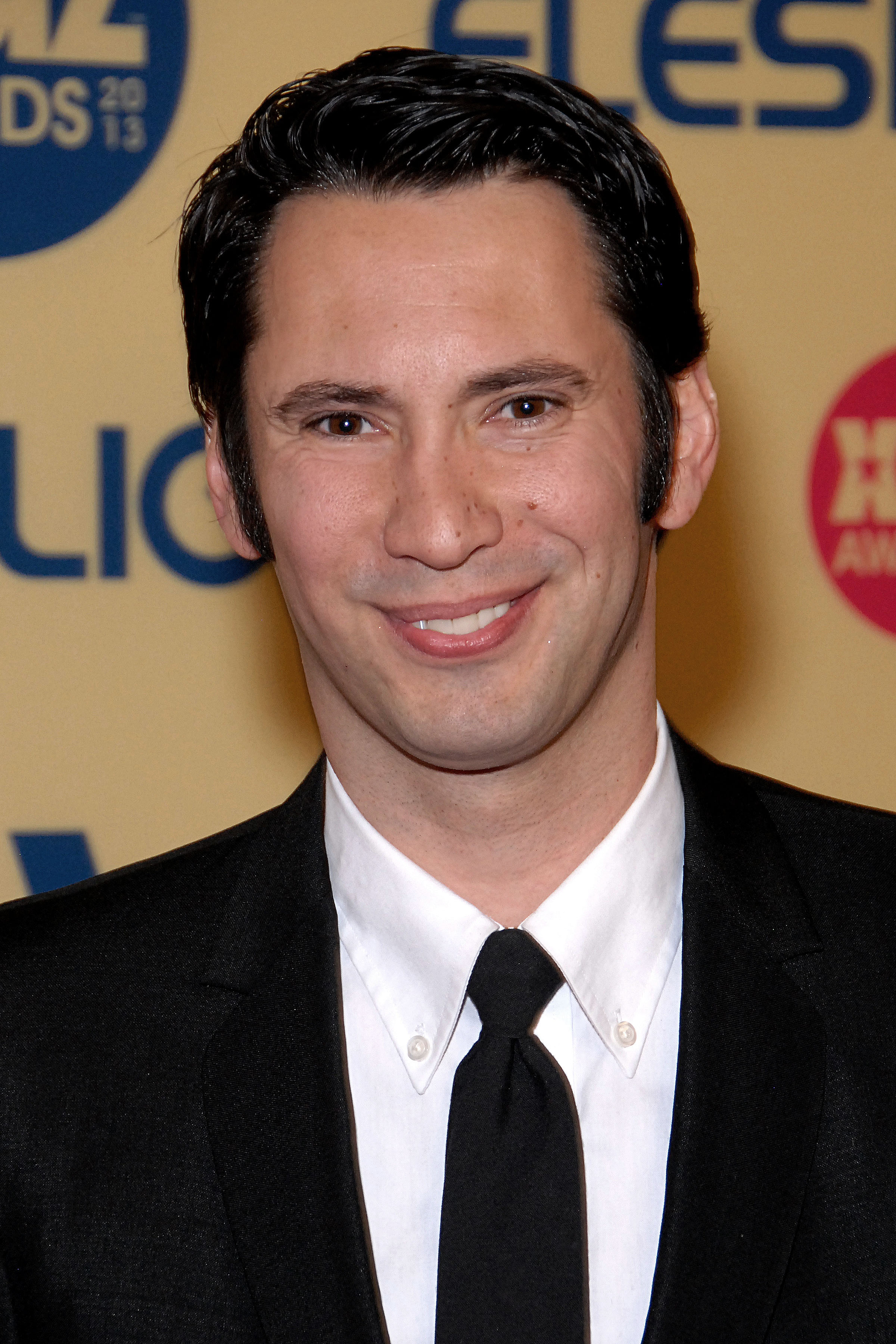

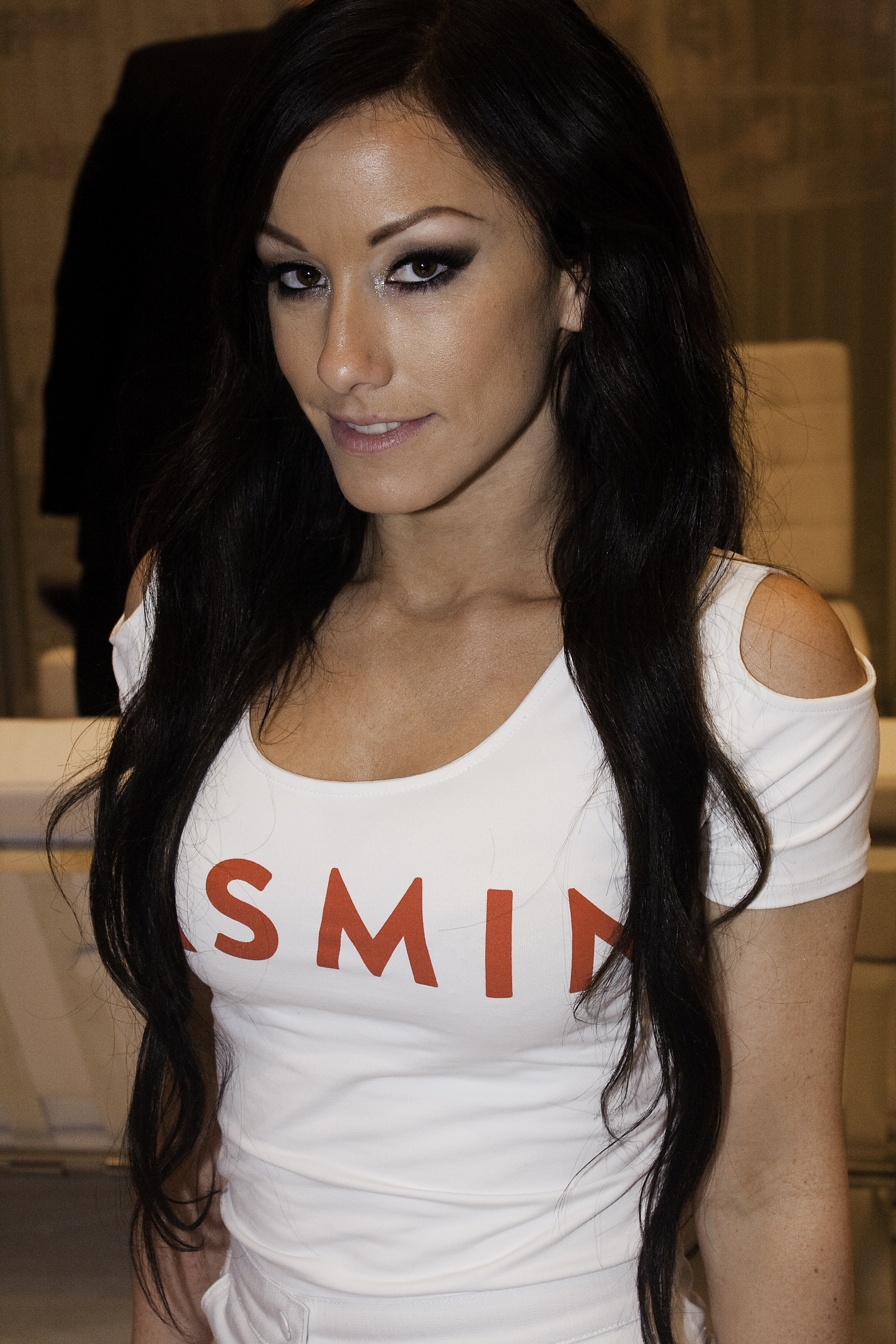

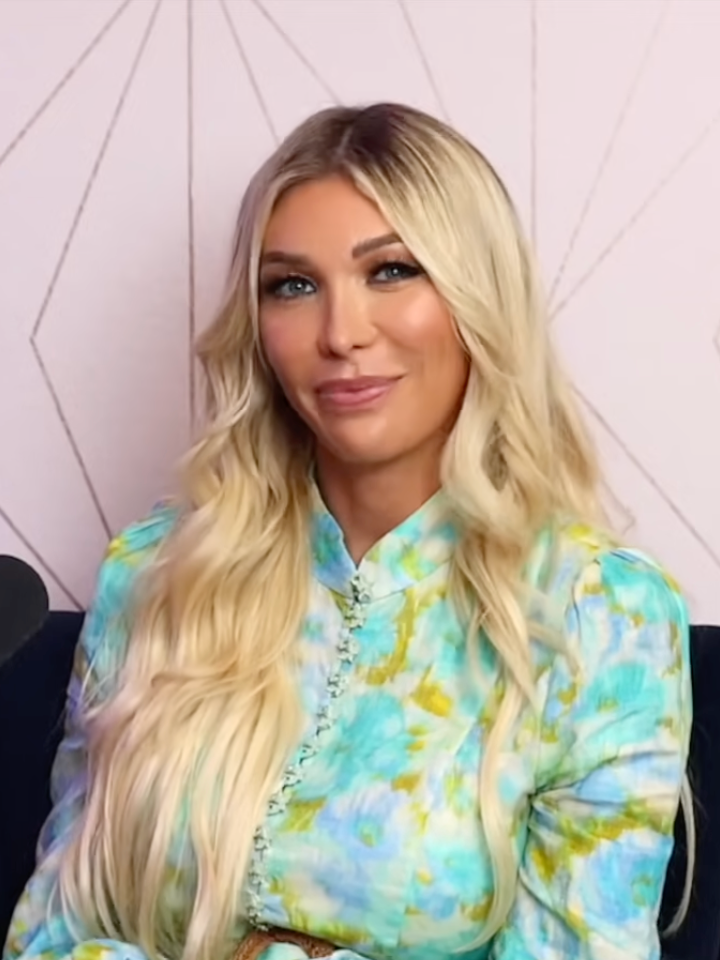

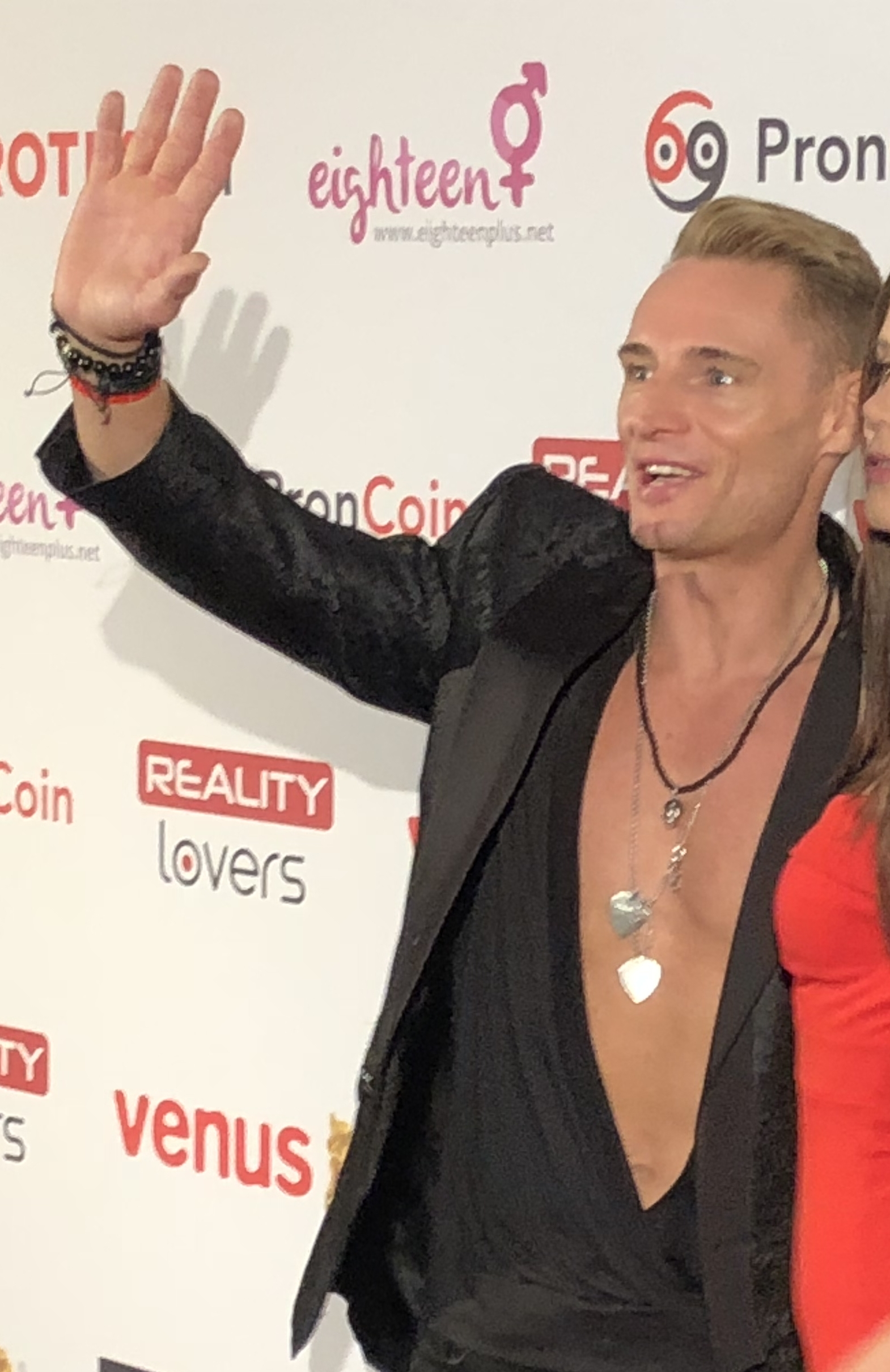
Award	Best Actor	Best Actress	Best Supporting Actor
Winner	Tommy Pistol	Ryan Reid	Ken Feels
Film	Strip	Deadly Vows	Once Upon a Time in the Valley
Award	Best Supporting Actress	Male Performer of the Year	Female Performer of the Year
Winner	Chloe Surreal	Vince Karter	Jennifer White
Film	Mind Games	–	–
Award	Transgender Performer of the Year	Male Foreign Performer of the Year	Female Foreign Performer of the Year
Winner	Aubrey Kate	Marcello Bravo	Eve Sweet
Previous Best Picture
Gold Diggers
Best Picture
Strip

The AVN Awards are film awards sponsored and presented by the American trade magazine AVN (Adult Video News) annually to honor achievements in the global adult entertainment industry. The awards are often called the "Oscars of porn".

The award ceremony occurs in early January during the AVN Adult Entertainment Expo in Las Vegas, Nevada. AVN sponsored the first AVN Awards ceremony in February 1984. Since 2008, the show has aired in a form edited for time on Showtime, which is usually broadcast in a 90-minute time slot.

The awards are divided into over 100 categories, some of which are analogous to industry awards offered in other film and video genres, and others specific to pornographic/erotic film and video.

Awards for gay adult video were a part of the AVN Awards from the 1987 ceremony through the 1998 ceremony. The increasing number of categories made the show unwieldy. For the 1999 ceremony AVN Magazine began hosting the GayVN Awards, an annual adult movie award event for gay adult video.

== Design and categories ==
=== Award design ===
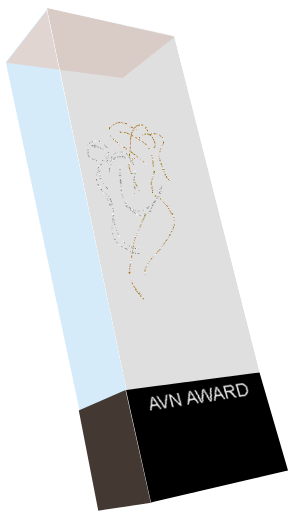
Graphic artwork of the AVN Award trophy from early 2000s

Artwork of the official AVN Award trophy since 2013

The design of the AVN Award changed several times before reaching its present form in 2013 when it was redesigned as part of the 30th anniversary of the awards show. The redesigning effort was led by Michael Krasun and supervised by AVN CEO Theo Sapoutzis. Krasun was a veteran with 25-plus years of experience in the designing, fabricating and building of restaurants, nightclubs, airport facilities and theme fixtures around the world.

The makers aimed to create an artifact that represented "sexual expression, integrity and exotic flair", and after months of work arrived at a figurine that showcased "two people in a very erotic embrace, yet without any explicit details of the bodies on display". This impressive resultant figurine was conferred the official AVN award going forward.

All the award trophies are hand-poured and custom mixed, containing 40 percent resin and 60 percent ground marble, making them very sturdy. An epoxy coating with a mix of bronze powders is applied as final finish. A solid black stone base with the award winners details is engraved on the front side. The artifact, from its inception to fabrication, was accomplished entirely in the US.

=== Award categories ===
- Best Actor
- Best Actress
- Best Supporting Actor
- Best Supporting Actress
- Male Performer of the Year
- Female Performer of the Year
- Male Foreign Performer of the Year
- Female Foreign Performer of the Year
- Transgender Performer of the Year
- Director of the Year
- Best New Starlet
- Best Director
- Best Non-Sex Performance
- Best Cinematography
- Best All-Sex Video
- Best Renting Title of the Year
- Best Selling Title of the Year
- Best Film
- Best Video Feature
- Best Foreign Feature
- Best Tease Performance
- Best All-Girl Sex Scene
- Best All-Girl Feature
- Best Newcomer – Gay Video
- Best Bi-Sexual Video
- Best Gay Video
- Best Actor – Gay Video
- Best Supporting Actor – Gay Video
- Best Director – Bi-Sexual Video
- Best Director – Gay Video
- Best Screenplay – Gay Video
- Best Sex Scene – Gay Video
- Best Non-Sexual Performance – Bi, Gay, or Trans Video
- Best Gay Alternative Video
- Best Gay Solo Video
- Best Gay Specialty Release
- Best Videography – Gay Video
- Best Alternative Adult Feature Film
- Most Outrageous Sex Scene
- Best Sex Comedy
- Best Trans Newcomer
- Breakthrough Award
- Best Performer of the Year – Gay Video
- Best Male Newcomer
- Best Director – Foreign Release
- Best Classic Release
- Best DVD
- Best High Definition Production
- Unsung Starlet of the Year
- Best High-End All-Sex Release
- Best All-Sex Release
- Best MILF Release
- Best Director – Feature
- Best Director – Foreign Feature
- Best Boy/Girl Scene
- Best All-Girl Couples Sex Scene
- MILF Performer of the Year

=== Honorary award ===
- AVN Hall of Fame

=== Listed winners ===
The winners of the AVN Award in various major categories since they began in 1984 have been listed.

== 1984–1989 ==
- (f) – film
- (v) – video

	1984	1985	1986	1987	1988	1989
Best New Starlet	Rachel Ashley	Ginger Lynn	Angel	Barbara Dare	Samantha Strong	Aja
Best Actress (f)	Sharon Mitchell – Sexcapades	Pamela Mann – X Factor	Sheri St. Claire – Corporate Assets	Colleen Brennan – Getting Personal	Krista Lane – Deep Throat II	Ona Zee – Portrait of an Affair
Best Actress (v)			Ginger Lynn – Project Ginger	Nina Hartley – Debbie Duz Dishes	Shanna McCullough – Hands Off	Barbara Dare – Naked Stranger
Best Actor (f)	Richard Pacheco – Irresistible	Eric Edwards – X Factor	Harry Reems – Trashy Lady	Mike Horner – Sexually Altered States	John Leslie – Firestorm II	Robert Bullock – Portrait of an Affair
Best Actor (v)			Eric Edwards – Dangerous Stuff	Buck Adams – Rockey X	Robert Bullock – Romeo and Juliet	Jon Martin – Case of the Sensuous Sinners
Best Supporting Actress (f)	Tiffany Clark – Hot Dreams	Lisa De Leeuw – Dixie Ray, Hollywood Star	Lisa De Leeuw – Raw Talent	Colleen Brennan – Star Angel	Tish Ambrose – Firestorm II	Nina Hartley – Portrait of an Affair
Best Supporting Actress (v)						Jacqueline Lorains – Beauty & the Beast
Best Supporting Actor (f)	Richard Pacheco – Nothing to Hide	John Leslie – Firestorm	Ron Jeremy – Candy Stripers II	Joey Silvera – She's So Fine	Michael Gaunt – Firestorm II	Jamie Gillis – Pretty Peaches II
Best Supporting Actor (v)						Richard Pacheco – Sensual Escape
Best Non-Sex Performance						Jose Duval – Pillowman
Best Director (f)	Cecil Howard – Scoundrels	Anthony Spinelli – Dixie Ray, Hollywood Star	Cecil Howard – Snake Eyes	Cecil Howard – Star Angel	Richard Pacheco – Careful, He May be Watching	Alex de Renzy – Pretty Peaches 2
Best Director (v)		Henri Pachard – Long Hard Nights	Paul Vatelli – Erotic Zones II	Jerome Tanner – Club Exotica	Henri Pachard – Talk Dirty to Me, Part V	John Leslie – Catwoman
Best Cinematography	Ken Gibb – All American Girls	Fred Andes – Dixie Ray, Hollywood Star	Larry Revene – Raw Talent	Sandy Beach – Star Angel	Elroy Brandy – Firestorm II	Mr. Ed – Miami Spice II
Best All-Sex Video	C.T. (Coed Teasers)	Unthinkable	Ball Busters	Wild Things	Baby Face II	Angel Puss
Best Renting Title of the Year					Traci, I Love You	The Devil in Mr. Holmes
Best Selling Title of the Year					Traci, I Love You	Miami Spice II
Best Film	Scoundrels	Talk Dirty To Me Part III	Raw Talent	Devil In Miss Jones 3	Careful, He May Be Watching	Pretty Peaches 2
Best Video Feature	Blue Voodoo	Long Hard Nights	Dangerous Stuff	Blame It on Ginger	Romeo and Juliet	The Catwoman
Best Foreign Feature	Grand Ecstasy	The Arrangement	Programmed For Pleasure	The Comeback of Marilyn	Forbidden Pleasures	The Devil in Mr. Holmes

== 1990–1994 ==
	1990	1991	1992	1993	1994
Best New Starlet	Victoria Paris and Tori Welles (tie)	Jennifer Stewart	Savannah	Alex Jordan	Shayla LaVeaux
Female Performer of the Year				Ashlyn Gere	Debi Diamond
Male Performer of the Year				Rocco Siffredi	Jonathan Morgan
Best Actress (f)	(no award given)	Hyapatia Lee – The Masseuse	Jeanna Fine – Hothouse Rose	Ashlyn Gere – Chameleons	Roxanne Blaze – Justine
Best Actress (v)	Sharon Kane – Bodies in Heat – The Sequel	Lauren Brice – Married Women	Ona Zee – The Starlet	Ashlyn Gere – Two Women	Leena – Blinded By Love
Best Actor (f)	(no award given)	Randy Spears – The Masseuse	Buck Adams – Roxy	Mike Horner – The Seduction of Mary	Mike Horner – Justine
Best Actor (v)	Jon Martin – Cool Sheets	Eric Edwards – The Last X-Rated Movie	Tom Byron – Sizzle	Joey Silvera – The Party	Jonathan Morgan – The Creasemaster
Best Supporting Actress (f)	(no award given)	Deidre Holland – Veil	Britt Morgan – On Trial	Ona Zee – The Secret Garden 1 & 2	Tianna – Justine
Best Supporting Actress (v)	Viper – Mystery of the Golden Lotus	Nina Hartley – The Last X-Rated Movie	Selena Steele – Sirens	Melanie Moore – The Party	Porsche Lynn – Servin' It Up
Best Supporting Actor (f)		John Martin – Pretty Peaches 3	Jon Dough – Brandy and Alexander	Joey Silvera – Face Dance, Parts I & II	Steve Drake – Whispered Lies
Best Supporting Actor (v)	Rick Savage – Bedman and Throbbin	Ron Jeremy – Playin' Dirty	Mike Horner – Bite	Tony Tedeschi – Smeers	Randy Spears – Haunted Nights
Best Non-Sex Performance	Nick Random – True Love	Jose Duval – Oh, What a Night	Carl Esser – On Trial	J.B. – Dirty Little Mind of Martin Fink	Jonathan Morgan – Haunted Nights
Best Tease Performance	Tracey Adams – Adventures of Buttman	Chantelle – Bend Over Babes	Tianna – Indian Summer, Parts 1 & 2	Racquel Darrian – Bonnie and Clyde	Tianna – Justine
Best Director (f)	Henri Pachard – The Nicole Stanton Story, Parts 1 & 2	Andrew Blake – House of Dreams	John Stagliano – Wild Goose Chase	John Stagliano – Face Dance, Parts I & II	Paul Thomas – Justine
Best Director (v)	Jean-Pierre Ferrand and Peter Davy – Voodoo Lust	Paul Thomas – Beauty & the Beast 2	Scotty Fox – The Cockateer	(Tie) Alex de Renzy – Two Women and Anthony Spinelli – The Party	Jim Enright – Haunted Nights
Best All-Girl Sex Scene (f)				Chameleons – Ashlyn Gere and Deidre Holland	Hidden Obsessions – Janine Lindemulder and Julia Ann
Best All-Girl Sex Scene (v)	True Love – Barbara Dare and April West	The New Barbarians – Victoria Paris and Sabrina Dawn	American Buttman in London – Misty McCaine and Carrie Jones	(no award given)	Buttslammers 2 – The Flashlight Orgy (Celeste, Felecia, Lia Baren, Sydney St. James and Tianna)
Best Cinematography	Night Trips – Andrew Blake	House of Dreams – Andrew Blake	Wild Goose Chase – John Stagliano	Face Dance, Parts I & II – John Stagliano	Hidden Obsession – Andrew Blake
Best All-Sex Video	Hello Molly	Buttman's Ultimate Workout	Buttman's Ultimate Workout	Realities 2	The Bottom Dweller
Best All-Girl Feature	Where the Boys Aren't	Ghost Lusters	Buttwoman	Kittens III	Buttslammers
Best Renting Title of the Year	The Nicole Stanton Story	Pretty Peaches 3	The Masseuse	Chameleons	New Wave Hookers 3
Best Selling Title of the Year	The Nicole Stanton Story	House of Dreams	New Wave Hookers 2	Chameleons	Friday Night Delights
Best Film	Night Trips	House of Dreams	(Tie) On Trial and Wild Goose Chase	Face Dance, Parts 1 & 2	Justine
Best Video Feature	Mad Love	Beauty and the Beast	Curse of the Catwoman	The Party	Haunted Nights
Best Foreign Feature	(no award given)	(no award given)	(no award given)	(no award given)	Private Video Magazine

	1990	1991	1992	1993	1994
Best Newcomer – Gay Video	Ryan Yeager	Jason Ross	Danny Sommers	B.J. Slater	Zak Spears
Best Bi-Sexual Video	Bi and Beyond III	The Last Good Bi	Innocence Found	Down Bi Law	Valley of the Bi Dolls
Best Gay Video	Undercover	More of a Man	Jumper	Kiss-Off	Abduction 2 & 3
Best Actor – Gay Video	Tim Lowe – Fratrimony	Joey Stefano – More of a Man, All Worlds Video	Ryan Yeager – Jumper	Michael Brawn – Kiss-Off	Johnny Rey – Romeo and Julian
Best Supporting Actor – Gay Video		Ryan Yeager – Stranded	Jason Ross – One Night Stands	Wes Daniels – Songs in the Key of Sex	Zak Spears – Total Corruption
Best Director – Bi-Sexual Video	Paul Norman – Bi and Beyond III	Paul Norman – Bi and Beyond IV	Paul Norman – Innocence Found	Josh Eliot – Down Bi Law	Josh Eliot – Valley of the Bi Dolls
Best Director – Gay Video	John Travis – Undercover	Taylor Hudson – The Rise	Jean-Daniel Cadinot – The Traveling Journeyman	Chi Chi LaRue – Songs in the Key of Sex	Sam Abdul – Romeo and Julian
Best Screenplay – Gay Video		Jerry Douglas – More of a Man	Jim Steel – Prince Charming	Stan Mitchell – Songs in the Key of Sex	Jerry Douglas – Honorable Discharge
Best Sex Scene – Gay Video	Heat in the Night – Lon Flexxe and Bill Marlowe	The Rise – Ryan Yeager and Scott Bond	Fetish – Ryan Yeager and Jason Ross	Scorcher – Erik Houston and Chris Stone	Romeo and Julian – Johnny Rey and Grant Larson
Best Non-Sexual Performance – Bi, Gay, or Trans Video		Chi Chi LaRue – More of a Man	Sharon Kane – Majestic Knight	Kenneth Weyerhaeuser – Kiss-Off	Gino Colbert – Honorable Discharge
Best Gay Alternative Video					Chi Chi LaRue's Hardbody Video Magazine
Best Gay Solo Video		Straight to Bed	Men Who Work It Alone	The Beat Cop	Pumping Fever
Best Gay Specialty Release					Male Genital Massage
Best Videography – Gay Video		John Trennell – Idol Eyes	Mark Thomas – Fetish	Ellary Stag – Disconnected	Todd Montgomery – Abduction 2 & 3
Best Alternative Adult Feature Film					Beach Babes from Beyond

== 1995–1999 ==
	1995	1996	1997	1998	1999
Best New Starlet	Kylie Ireland	Jenna Jameson	Missy	Johnni Black	Alisha Klass
Female Performer of the Year	Asia Carrera	Kaitlyn Ashley	Missy	Stephanie Swift	Chloe
Male Performer of the Year	Jon Dough	Rocco Siffredi	T.T. Boy	Tom Byron	Tom Byron
Best Actress (f)	Ashlyn Gere – The Masseuse 2	Jeanna Fine – Skin Hunger	Melissa Hill – Penetrator 2: Grudgefuck Day	Dyanna Lauren – Bad Wives	Shanna McCullough – Looker
Best Actress (v)	Ashlyn Gere – Body & Soul	Jenna Jameson – Wicked One	Jeanna Fine – My Surrender	Stephanie Swift – Miscreants	Jeanna Fine – Café Flesh 2
Best Actor (f)	Buck Adams – No Motive	Mike Horner – Lessons in Love	Jamie Gillis – Bobby Sox	Steven St. Croix – Bad Wives	James Bonn – Models
Best Actor (v)	Steven St. Croix – Chinatown	Jon Dough – Latex	Jon Dough – Shock	Tom Byron – Indigo Delta	Michael J. Cox – L.A. Uncovered
Best Supporting Actress (f)	Tyffany Million – Sex	Ariana – Desert Moon	Shanna McCullough – Bobby Sox	Melissa Hill – Bad Wives	Chloe – The Masseuse 3
Best Supporting Actress (v)	Kaitlyn Ashley – Shame	Jeanna Fine – Dear Diary	Juli Ashton – Head Trip	Jeanna Fine – Miscreants	Katie Gold – Pornogothic
Best Supporting Actor (f)	Jon Dough – Sex	Steven St. Croix – Forever Young	Tony Tedeschi – The Show	Wilde Oscar – Doin' the Ritz	Michael J. Cox – Models
Best Supporting Actor (v)	Jonathan Morgan – The Face	Alex Sanders – Dear Diary	Tony Tedeschi – Silver Screen Confidential	Dave Hardman – Texas Dildo Masquerade	Jamie Gillis – Forever Night
Best Non-Sex Performance	E.Z. Ryder – Erotika	Veronica Hart – Nylon	Scotty Schwartz – Silver Screen Confidential	Jamie Gillis – New Wave Hookers 5	Rob Black – The Pornographer
Best Tease Performance	Christina Angel – Dog Walker	Christy Canyon – Comeback	Janine – Extreme Close-Up	Silvia Saint Fresh Meat 4	Ava Lustra – Leg Sex Dream
Best Director (f)	John Leslie – Dog Walker	Michael Zen – Blue Movie	Paul Thomas – Bobby Sox	Nic Cramer – Operation Sex Siege	Nic Cramer – Looker
Best Director (v)	John Leslie – Bad Habits	Michael Ninn – Latex	Michael Ninn – Shock	Rob Black – Miscreants	John Leslie – The Lecher 2
Best All-Girl Sex Scene (f)	The Dinner Party – Celeste, Debi Diamond and Misty Rain	Fantasy Chamber – Felecia, Jenteal and Misty Rain	Dreams of Desire – Melissa Hill and Jill Kelly	Satyr – Missy and Jenna Jameson	White Angel – Laura Palmer, Ruby, Charlie and Claudia
Best All-Girl Sex Scene (v)	Buttslammers 4 – Felecia, Bionca and Debi Diamond	Takin' It to the Limit 6 – Traci Allen, Careena Collins, Felecia, Jill Kelly and Misty Rain	Buttslammers the 13th – Missy, Misty Rain and Caressa Savage	Cellar Dwellers 2 – Jeanna Fine, P. J. Sparxx and Tricia Devereaux	Buttslammers 16 – Caressa Savage, Roxanne Hall and Charlie
Most Outrageous Sex Scene (v)	Depraved Fantasies – Debi Diamond, Bionca and Tammi Ann	Private Video Magazine 20 – Sex under the Eiffel Tower (Channone, David Perry and Jean-Yves Le Castel)	Shock – Shayla LaVeaux, T. T. Boy and Vince Vouyer	My Girlfriend's Girlfriend – Mila and Kiss	Ass Artist – Mila
Best Cinematography	Dog Walker – Jack Remy	Sex 2 – Bill Smith	Unleashed – Andrew Blake	Zazel: The Scent of Love – Philip Mond	Looker – Jack Remy
Best All-Sex Film	The Dinner Party	The Player	Unleashed	Zazel: The Scent of Love	High Heels
Best All-Sex Video	Takin' It to the Limit 1 & 2	Bottom Dweller 33 1/3	John Leslie's Fresh Meat 3	John Leslie's Fresh Meat 4	John Leslie's Fresh Meat 5
Best All-Girl Feature	Creme de Femme	Buttslammers 10	The Violation of Missy	Diva 4	Welcome To The Cathouse
Best Renting Title of the Year	John Wayne Bobbitt Uncut	Latex	Shock	New Wave Hookers 5	Pam & Tommy Lee: Hardcore & Uncensored
Best Selling Title of the Year	John Wayne Bobbitt Uncut	Latex	(Tie) Shock and The World's Biggest Gangbang 2	Zazel: The Scent of Love	Pam & Tommy Lee: Hardcore & Uncensored
Best Film	Sex	Blue Movie	Bobby Sox	Bad Wives	Looker
Best Sex Comedy		Risqué Burlesque	The Show	Cellar Dweller 2	The Pornographer
Best Video Feature	Shame	Latex	Shock	Buda	Café Flesh 2
Best Foreign Feature	Virgin Treasures	The Tower 1 & 2	The Pyramid	The Fugitive, Pt. 1	Tatiana
Breakthrough Award			Steve Perry – for Ben Dover series	Steve Orenstein	Alex Sanders

	1995	1996	1997	1998	1999
Best Performer of the Year – Gay Video	Joey Stefano	J.T. Sloan	Kurt Young	Jim Buck	
Best Newcomer – Gay Video	Steve Marks	Ken Ryker	Kurt Young	Jim Buck	
Best Bi-Sexual Video	Revenge of the Bi Dolls	Remembering Times Gone Bi	Switchhitters VIII	Night of the Living Bi Dolls	
Best Gay Video	Flashpoint	Renegade	Flesh and Blood	Naked Highway	
Best Actor – Gay Video	Ryan Idol – Idol Country	Ken Ryker – Renegade	Kurt Young – Flesh and Blood	Jim Buck – Naked Highway	
Best Supporting Actor – Gay Video	Scott Baldwin – Flashpoint	Johnny Rahm – All About Steve	Dino Phillips – Happily Ever After	Bo Summers – Family Values	
Best Director – Bi-Sexual Video	Josh Eliot – Revenge of the Bi Dolls	James C. Stark – Remembering Times Gone Bi	Gino Colbert – Switchhitters VIII	Josh Eliot – Night of the Living Bi Dolls	
Best Director – Gay Video	John Rutherford – Flashpoint	John Rutherford – The Renegade	Jerry Douglas – Flesh and Blood	Wash West – Naked Highway	
Best Screenplay – Gay Video	Gender – Idol Country	Jerry Douglas – The Diamond Stud	Jerry Douglas – Flesh and Blood	Wash West – Naked Highway	
Best Sex Scene – Gay Video	Flashpoint – Trent Reed and Bryce Colby	Jawbreaker – Daryl Brock, Chip Daniels, Rod Majors, Ty Russell and Scott Russell	Tradewinds – Derek Cameron and Kurt Young	Jeff Stryker's Underground – Jeff Stryker and Derek Cameron	
Best Non-Sexual Performance – Bi, Gay, or Trans Video	Sharon Kane – Conflict of Interest	Lana Luster – Driven Home	Jeanna Fine – Flesh and Blood	Sharon Kane – Family Values	
Best Gay Alternative Video	Vivid Video – A Gay Man's Guide to Safe Sex	Siberian Heat	Nighthawken	Summer, The First Time	
Best Gay Solo Video	(tie) 10 Plus, Vol. 2, Rob Lee's Private Moments	Rex Chandler One on One	Brad Posey's Hot Sessions 3	Titan Men – Alone in the Backwoods	
Best Gay Specialty Release	The New Pledgemaster	Pissed	Orgy Boys 1 & 2	Fallen Angel	
Best Videography – Gay Video	Bruce Cam and Kathy Mack – Idol Country	Todd Montgomery – Big River	Bruce Cam – Desert Train	Wash West – Naked Highway	
Best Alternative Adult Feature Film	Killer Looks	Under Lock & Key	Scoring	Crash	

- From 1999 onwards, AVN Magazine began hosting the GayVN Awards, an annual adult movie award event for gay adult video.

== 2000–2004 ==
	2000	2001	2002	2003	2004
Best New Starlet	Bridgette Kerkove	Tera Patrick	Violet Blue	Jenna Haze	Stormy Daniels
Female Performer of the Year	Inari Vachs	Jewel De'Nyle	Nikita Denise	Aurora Snow	Ashley Blue
Male Performer of the Year	Lexington Steele	Evan Stone	Lexington Steele	Lexington Steele	Michael Stefano
Transsexual Performer of the Year					Vaniity
Best Male Newcomer				Nick Manning	Ben English
Best Actress (f)	Chloe – Chloe	Taylor Hayes and Raylene (tie)	Ginger Lynn – Taken	Taylor St. Claire – Fashionistas	Savanna Samson – Looking In
Best Actress (v)	Serenity – Double Feature!	Serenity – M Caught in the Act	Sydnee Steele – Euphoria	Devinn Lane – Breathless	Julia Ann – Beautiful
Best Actor (f)	James Bonn – Chloe	Evan Stone – Adrenaline	Anthony Crane – Beast	Brad Armstrong – Falling From Grace	Randy Spears – Heart of Darkness
Best Actor (v)	Randy Spears – Double Feature!	Joel Lawrence – Raw	Mike Horner – Euphoria	Dale DaBone – Betrayed By Beauty	Evan Stone – Space Nuts
Best Supporting Actress (f)	Janine – Seven Deadly Sins	Chloe – True Blue	Julie Meadows – Fade To Black	Belladonna – The Fashionistas	Dru Berrymore – Heart of Darkness
Best Supporting Actress (v)	Shanna McCullough – Double Feature!	Midori – West Side	Ava Vincent – Succubus	Sydnee Steele – Breathless	Brooke Ballentyne – Rawhide
Best Supporting Actor (f)	Michael J. Cox – Seven Deadly Sins	Randy Spears – Watchers	Herschel Savage – Taken	Mr. Marcus – Paradise Lost	Steven St. Croix – Looking In
Best Supporting Actor (v)	Tom Byron – LA 399	Wilde Oscar – West Side	Mike Horner – Wild Thing	Randy Spears – Hercules	Randy Spears – Space Nuts
Best Non-Sex Performance	Anthony Crane – Double Feature!	Rob Spallone – The Sopornos	Paul Thomas – Fade To Black	Tina Tyler – The Ozporns	Allan Rene – Opera
Best Tease Performance	Dahlia Grey – Playthings	Jessica Drake – Shayla's Web	Tera Patrick – Island Fever	Belladonna – The Fashionistas	Michelle Wild – Crack Her Jack
Female Foreign Performer of the Year				Rita Faltoyano	Mandy Bright
Male Foreign Performer of the Year				Rocco Siffredi	Manuel Ferrara
Best Director (f)	Ren Savant – Seven Deadly Sins	James Avalon – Les Vampyres	Paul Thomas – Fade To Black	John Stagliano – The Fashionistas	Paul Thomas – Heart of Darkness
Best Director (v)	Jonathan Morgan – Double Feature!	Nic Andrews – Dark Angels	Brad Armstrong – Euphoria	(Tie) Michael Raven – Breathless and Rocco Siffredi – The Ass Collector	Michael Raven – Beautiful
Best Director – Foreign Release	Anita Rinaldi – Return To Planet Sexxx	Tanya Hyde – Hell, Whores and High Heels	Kovi – The Splendor of Hell	Anthony Adamo – Private Gladiator	Gazzman – The Scottish Loveknot
Best All-Girl Sex Scene (f)	Seven Deadly Sins – Janine Lindemulder and Julia Ann	Les Vampyres – Ava Vincent and Syren	Bad Wives 2 – Jail Cell Group	The Fashionistas – Belladonna and Taylor St. Claire	Snakeskin – Dru Berrymore and Teanna Kai
Best All-Girl Sex Scene (v)	Tampa Tushy Fest – Alisha Klass and Chloe	Dark Angels – Sydnee Steele and Jewel De'Nyle	Where The Girls Sweat 5 – Chloe, Taylor St. Claire, Sindee Coxx and Felecia	I Dream of Jenna – Autumn, Nikita Denise and Jenna Jameson	The Violation of Jessica Darlin – Jessica Darlin, Brandi Lyons, Lana Moore, Hollie Stevens, Flick Shagwell, Ashley Blue and Crystal Ray
Most Outrageous Sex Scene (v)	Perverted Stories 22 – Mila, Herschel Savage and Dave Hardman	In Days of Whore – Tyce Buné and Bridgette Kerkove	Perverted Stories 31 – Kristen Kane, Herschel Savage and Rave	Autumn Haze vs. Son of Dong – Autumn Haze	Perverted Stories, The Movie – Julie Night, Maggie Star and Mr. Pete
Best Cinematography	Search for the Snow Leopard – Johnny English	Jake Jacobs & Ralph Parfait	Blond & Brunettes – Andrew Blake	The Villa – Andrew Blake	Hard Edge – Andrew Blake
Best All-Sex Film	Playthings	Erotica	Porno Vision	(no award given)	Hard Edge
Best All-Sex Video	The Voyeur 12	Buttwoman vs. Buttwoman	Buttwoman Iz Bella	Bring 'Um Young 9	Fetish: The Dreamscape
Best All-Girl Feature	The Four Finger Club 2	Hard Love/How to Fuck in High Heels	The Violation of Kate Frost	The Violation of Aurora Snow	Babes Illustrated 13
Best Classic Release	Devil In Miss Jones 3	Chameleons	The Opening of Misty Beethoven	Pretty Peaches 2	Insatiable
Best Renting Title of the Year	Devil in Miss Jones 6	Dream Quest	Island Fever	Briana Loves Jenna	The Fashionistas
Best Selling Title of the Year	The Houston 620	Dream Quest	Snoop Dogg's Doggystyle	Briana Loves Jenna	Hustlaz: Diary of a Pimp
Best Film	Seven Deadly Sins	Watchers	Fade to Black	The Fashionistas	Heart of Darkness
Best Sex Comedy	Double Feature!	M Caught In the Act	Cap'n Mongo's Porno Playhouse	Kung-Fu Girls	Space Nuts
Best Foreign Feature	Amanda's Diary 2	Rocco: Animal Trainer 3	Christoph's Beautiful Girls	Private Gladiator	The Scottish Loveknot
Best Video Feature	Dark Garden	Dark Angels	Euphoria	The Ass Collector	(Tie) Rawhide and Beautiful
Best DVD	Cashmere	Raw	Unreal	Euphoria	The Fashionistas
Best High Definition Production					Rawhide

== 2005–2009 ==
	2005	2006	2007	2008	2009
Best New Starlet	Cytherea	McKenzie Lee	Naomi Russell	Bree Olson	Stoya
Female Performer of the Year	Lauren Phoenix	Audrey Hollander	Hillary Scott	Sasha Grey	Jenna Haze
Male Performer of the Year	Manuel Ferrara	Manuel Ferrara	Tommy Gunn	Evan Stone	James Deen
Transsexual Performer of the Year	Vicki Richter	Gia Darling	Buck Angel	Allanah Starr	Wendy Williams
Best Male Newcomer	Tommy Gunn	Scott Nails	Tommy Pistol	Alan Stafford	Anthony Rosano
Unsung Starlet of the Year			Mika Tan	Gianna Michaels	Amber Rayne
Best Actress (f)	Jenna Jameson – The Masseuse	Savanna Samson – The New Devil in Miss Jones	Jessica Drake – Manhunters	Penny Flame – Layout	
Best Actress (v)	Jessica Drake – Fluff and Fold	Janine Lindemulder – Pirates	Hillary Scott – Corruption	Eva Angelina – Upload	Jessica Drake – Fallen
Best Actor (f)	Justin Sterling – The Masseuse	Randy Spears – Eternity	Randy Spears – Manhunters	Tom Byron – Layout	
Best Actor (v)	Barrett Blade – Loaded	Evan Stone – Pirates	Evan Stone – Sex Pix	Brad Armstrong – Coming Home	Evan Stone – Pirates II: Stagnetti's Revenge
Best Supporting Actress (f)	Lezley Zen – Bare Stage	Jenna Jameson – The New Devil in Miss Jones	Kirsten Price – Manhunters	Kylie Ireland, Layout	
Best Supporting Actress (v)	Ashley Blue – Adore	Stormy Daniels – Camp Cuddly Pines Powertool Massacre	Katsumi – Fashionistas Safado: The Challenge	Hillary Scott – Upload	Belladonna – Pirates II: Stagnetti's Revenge
Best Supporting Actor (f)	Rod Fontana – The 8th Sin	Randy Spears – Dark Side	Kurt Lockwood – To Die For	Randy Spears – Flasher	
Best Supporting Actor (v)	Randy Spears – Fluff and Fold	Tommy Gunn – Pirates	Manuel Ferrara – She Bangs	Barrett Blade – Coming Home	Ben English – Pirates II: Stagnetti's Revenge
Female Foreign Performer of the Year	Katsuni	Katsuni	Katsuni	Monica Mattos	Eve Angel
Male Foreign Performer of the Year	Steve Holmes	Steve Holmes	Jean Val Jean	David Perry	Rocco Siffredi
Best Director (f)	Paul Thomas – The Masseuse	Paul Thomas – The New Devil in Miss Jones	Brad Armstrong – Manhunters	Paul Thomas – Layout	
Best Director (v)	David Stanley – Pretty Girl	Joone – Pirates	Eli Cross – Corruption	John Stagliano – Fashionistas Safado: Berlin	Joone – Pirates II: Stagnetti's Revenge (feature); Eli Cross – Icon (non-feature)
Best Director – Foreign Release	Narcis Bosch – Hot Rats	Rocco Siffredi – Who Fucked Rocco?	Pierre Woodman – Sex City	Alessandro Del Mar – Dangerous Sex	Juan Carlos and Jesus Villaobos – Jason Colt: Mystery of the Sexy Diamonds (feature); Christoph Clark – Nasty Intentions 2 (non-feature)
Best All-Girl Sex Scene (f)	The Masseuse – Jenna Jameson and Savanna Samson	The New Devil in Miss Jones – Jenna Jameson and Savanna Samson	FUCK – Clara G, Felecia, Jessica Drake and Katsumi	Sex & Violins – Faith Leon, Monique Alexander and Stefani Morgan	
Best All-Girl Sex Scene (v)	The Violation of Audrey Hollander – Ashley Blue, Audrey Hollander, Brodi, Gia Paloma, Kelly Kline and Tyla Winn	Pirates – Janine and Jesse Jane	Island Fever 4 – Jana Cova, Jesse Jane, Sophia Santi and Teegan Presley	Babysitters – Alektra Blue, Angie Savage, Lexxi Tyler, Sammie Rhodes and Sophia Santi	
Most Outrageous Sex Scene (v)	Misty Beethoven: The Musical – Chloe, Ava Vincent and Randy Spears	Re-Penetrator – Joanna Angel	Girlvert 11 – Amber Wild, Steve French and Ashley Blue	Ass Blasting Felching Anal Whores – Cindy Crawford, Rick Masters and Audrey Hollander	Night of the Giving Head – Nikki Rhodes, Alan Stafford, Chris Johnson, Claire Dames, Jack Vegas & Samantha Sin
Best Cinematography	Flirts – Andrew Blake	The New Devil in Miss Jones – Ralph Parfait	FUCK – Francois Clousot	Fashion Underground	Paid Companions
Best High-End All-Sex Release				Broken	Icon
Best All-Sex Release	Stuntgirl	Squealer	(Tie) Blacklight Beauties and Neu Wave Hookers	G for Gianna	Alexis Texas is Buttwoman
Best All-Girl Feature	The Connasseur	Belladonna's Fucking Girls	Belladonna: No Warning	Girlvana 3	Girlvana 4
Best MILF Release				It's a Mommy Thing	The Cougar Club
Best Classic Release	Deep Throat	Ginger Lynn The Movie	Neon Nights	Debbie Does Dallas	Zazel: The Scent of Love
Best Renting Title of the Year	1 Night in Paris	The Masseuse	Pirates	Debbie Does Dallas...Again	Cheerleaders
Best Selling Title of the Year	1 Night in Paris	1 Night in China	Pirates	Pirates	Cheerleaders
Best Film	The Masseuse	The New Devil in Miss Jones	Manhunters	Layout	Cry Wolf
Best Sex Comedy	Misty Beethoven: The Musical	Camp Cuddly Pines Powertool Massacre	Joanna's Angels 2	Operation Desert Stormy	Not Bewitched XXX
Best Foreign Feature	Hot Rats	Robinson Crusoe on Sin Island	Porn Wars: Episode 1	Furious Fuckers: Final Race	Jason Colt : The Mystery of the Sexy Diamonds
Best Video Feature	Bella Loves Jenna	Pirates	Corruption	Upload	Pirates 2: Stagnetti's Revenge
Best DVD	Fetish Circus	Pirates			
Best High Definition Production	Island Fever 3	Pirates	Fashionistas Safado	Fashionistas Safado: Berlin	Pirates 2: Stagnetti's Revenge

^[1] The category, introduced in 2007, was first called "Underrated Starlet of the Year (Unrecognized Excellence)". It has since been renamed to "Unsung Starlet of the Year".

== 2010–2014 ==
	2010	2011	2012	2013	2014
Best New Starlet	Kagney Linn Karter	Gracie Glam	Brooklyn Lee	Remy LaCroix	Mia Malkova
Female Performer of the Year	Tori Black		Bobbi Starr	Asa Akira	Bonnie Rotten
Male Performer of the Year	Manuel Ferrara	Evan Stone	Manuel Ferrara	James Deen	Manuel Ferrara
Transsexual Performer of the Year	Kimber James	Bailey Jay		Vaniity	Eva Lin
Best Male Newcomer	Dane Cross	Seth Gamble	Xander Corvus	Logan Pierce	Ike Diezel
Unsung Starlet of the Year	Shawna Leneé	Charley Chase	Bridgette B	Brandy Aniston	Presley Hart
Best Actress	Kimberly Kane – The Sex Files: A Dark XXX Parody	Andy San Dimas – This Ain't Glee XXX & India Summer – An Open Invitation: A Real Swinger's Party in San Francisco	Jessie Andrews – Portrait of a Call Girl	Lily Carter – Wasteland	Remy LaCroix – The Temptation of Eve (New Sensations Erotic Stories)
Best Actor	Eric Swiss – Not Married With Children XXX	Tom Byron – The Big Lebowski: A XXX Parody	Dale DaBone – Elvis XXX: A Porn Parody	Steven St. Croix – Torn	Tommy Pistol – Evil Head
Best Supporting Actress	Penny Flame – Deep Throat	Lexi Belle – Batman XXX: A Porn Parody	Jesse Jane – Fighters	Capri Anderson – Pee-Wee's XXX Adventure: A Porn Parody	Brandy Aniston – Not The Wizard of Oz XXX
Best Supporting Actor	Tom Byron – Deep Throat	Evan Stone – Batman XXX: A Porn Parody	Xander Corvus – Star Trek: The Next Generation - A XXX Parody	Tom Byron – Star Wars XXX: A Porn Parody	Xander Corvus – Underworld
Female Foreign Performer of the Year	Aletta Ocean	Angel Dark	Aleska Diamond	Aleska Diamond	Anissa Kate
Male Foreign Performer of the Year	Toni Ribas	Rocco Siffredi			
Director of the Year	Will Ryder	Axel Braun	Axel Braun	Axel Braun	Axel Braun
Best Director – Feature	David Aaron Clark – Pure	Brad Armstrong – Speed	Graham Travis – Portrait of a Call Girl	Graham Travis – Wasteland	Brad Armstrong – Underworld
Best Director – Foreign Feature	Moire Candy (Louis Moire/Max Candy) – Ritual & Paul Chaplin – Black Beauty: Escape to Eden	Paul Chaplin – Department S, Mission One: City of Broken Angels	Ettore Buchi – Mission Asspossible	Max Candy – Inglorious Bitches	Max Candy & Michael Ninn – The Ingenuous
Best Boy/Girl Scene	Amy Ried, Ralph Long – 30 Rock: A XXX Parody	Kristina Rose, Manuel Ferrara – Kristina Rose Is Slutwoman	Manuel Ferrara, Lexi Belle – The Bombshells 3	Nacho Vidal, Alexis Ford – Darkside	Riley Reid & Mandingo – Mandingo Massacre
Best All-Girl Couples Sex Scene	Tori Black, Lexi Belle – Field of Schemes 5	Jenna Haze, Monique Alexander – Meow!		Brooklyn Lee, Ruth Medina, Samantha Bentley – Brooklyn Lee: Nymphomaniac	
Most Outrageous Sex Scene	Bobbi Starr in "Go Fuck Yourself" from Belladonna: No Warning 4	Adrianna Nicole, Amy Brooke, Allie Haze in "Enema Boot Camp" from Belladonna: Fetish Fanatic 8	Brooklyn Lee, Juelz Ventura in "Suck My Sack With a Straw" from American Cocksucking Sluts	Brooklyn Lee, Rocco Siffredi in "Clothespin-Head" from Voracious: The First Season	
MILF Performer of the Year	Julia Ann	Julia Ann	India Summer	Julia Ann	India Summer
Best All-Girl Release	Evil Pink 4	Meow!	Cherry 2	Dani	Meow! 3
Best MILF Release	It's a Mommy Thing! 4	Dirty Rotten Mother Fuckers 4	Seasoned Players	It's a Mommy Thing! 6	MILF Revolution – Lisa Ann & Jules Jordan
Best Foreign Feature	Billionaire – Pure Play Media	Alice: A Fairy Love Tale	Mission Asspossible	Ass Trapped Undercover	The Ingenuous
Best Sex Comedy	Flight Attendants	Couples Camp	Grindhouse XXX	Nurses 2	Band Sluts

== 2015–2019 ==
	2015	2016	2017	2018	2019
Best New Starlet	Carter Cruise	Abella Danger	Holly Hendrix	Jill Kassidy	Ivy Wolfe
Female Performer of the Year	Anikka Albrite	Riley Reid	Adriana Chechik	Angela White	
Male Performer of the Year	Mick Blue			Markus Dupree	Manuel Ferrara
Transsexual Performer of the Year	Venus Lux		Aubrey Kate		Chanel Santini
Best Male Newcomer	Rob Piper	Brad Knight	Ricky Johnson	Juan "El Caballo" Loco	Jason Luv
Unsung Starlet of the Year	Presley Hart				
Best Actress	Carter Cruise – Second Chances	Penny Pax – The Submission of Emma Marx: Boundaries	Kleio Valentien – Suicide Squad XXX: An Axel Braun Parody	Sara Luvv – The Faces of Alice	Eliza Jane – Anne: A Taboo Parody
Best Actor	Steven St. Croix – Wetwork	Tommy Pistol – Stryker	Xander Corvus – The Preacher's Daughter	Tommy Pistol – Ingenue	Seth Gamble – Deadpool XXX: An Axel Braun Parody
Best Supporting Actress	Veronica Avluv – Cinderella XXX: An Axel Braun Parody	Kleio Valentien – Batman v Superman XXX: An Axel Braun Parody	Joanna Angel – Cindy Queen of Hell	Kristen Scott – Half His Age: A Teenage Tragedy	Joanna Angel – A Trailer Park Taboo
Best Supporting Actor	Xander Corvus – Holly...Would	Steven St. Croix – Peter Pan XXX: An Axel Braun Parody	Brad Armstrong – The Preacher's Daughter	Small Hands – Half His Age: A Teenage Tragedy	Charles Dera – Cartel Sex
Female Foreign Performer of the Year	Anissa Kate	Misha Cross		Jasmine Jae	Anissa Kate
Male Foreign Performer of the Year	Rocco Siffredi		Danny D	Ryan Ryder	Rocco Siffredi
Director of the Year	Mason	Greg Lansky			Kayden Kross
Best Director – Feature	Brad Armstrong – Aftermath	Paul Deeb – Marriage 2.0	Jacky St. James – The Submission of Emma Marx: Exposed	Axel Braun – Justice League XXX: An Axel Braun Parody	Axel Braun – The Possession of Mrs. Hyde
Best Director – Foreign Feature	Herve Bodilis – Anissa Kate the Widow	Dick Bush – The Doctor	John Stagliano – Hard in Love	Hervé Bodilis & Pascal Lucas – Revenge of a Daughter	
Best Boy/Girl Scene	Aidra Fox & Ryan Madison – Jean Fucking	Abigail Mac & Flash Brown – Black & White 4	Kendra Sunderland, Mick Blue – Natural Beauties	Angela White & Manuel Ferrara – Angela 3, AGW/Girlfriends	Avi Love & Ramón Nomar – The Possession of Mrs. Hyde
Best All-Girl Couples Sex Scene		Angela White, Alexis Texas & Anikka Albrite – Angela 2	Serena Blair, Celeste Star & Alix Lynx – AI: Artificial Intelligence	Melissa Moore, Elsa Jean & Adria Rae – Best New Starlets 2017	Ivy Wolfe, Eliza Jane & Jenna Sativa – A Flapper Girl Story
Most Outrageous Sex Scene	Adriana Chechik, Erik Everhard, James Deen & Mick Blue – "Two's Company, Three's a Crowd", from Gangbang Me	Lea Lexis & Tommy Pistol – "Nightmare for the Dairy Council" from Analmals	Holly Hendrix, Adriana Chechik & Markus Dupree – "Creamy Bottom Fun Ball Happy Time" from Holly Hendrix's Anal Experience	Viking Girls Gone Horny, Desire/Girlfriends; Leya Falcon & Ophelia Rain in "Well There's ONE Place You Can Put an AVN Award"	Charlotte Sartre, Margot Downonme & Tommy Pistol in "My First Boy/Girl/Puppet" from The Puppet Inside Me
MILF Performer of the Year	India Summer	Kendra Lust		Cherie DeVille	
Best All-Girl Release	Alexis & Asa, and Women Seeking Women 100 (tie)			Angela Loves Women 3, AGW/Girlfriends	Angela Loves Women 4, AGW/Girlfriends
Best MILF Release	Dirty Rotten Mother Fuckers 7		Dirty Rotten Mother Fuckers 10	MILF Performers of the Year 2017, Elegant Angel Productions	MILF Performers of the Year 2018, Elegant Angel Productions
Best Foreign Feature	Anissa Kate the Widow	The Doctor	Sherlock: A XXX Parody	Bulldogs	A 40 Year Old Widow
Best Sex Comedy	Bikini Babes Are Shark Bait	Love, Sex & TV News	Cindy Queen of Hell	Jews Love Black Cock	Love in the Digital Age
Best Web Retail Store					DallasNovelty.com

== 2020–2024 ==
	2020	2021	2022	2023	2024
Best New Starlet	Gianna Dior	Scarlit Scandal	Blake Blossom	Charly Summer	Chanel Camryn
Female Performer of the Year	Angela White	Emily Willis	Gianna Dior	Kira Noir	Vanna Bardot
Male Performer of the Year	Small Hands		Tommy Pistol	Seth Gamble	Isiah Maxwell
Transsexual Performer of the Year	Natalie Mars	Aubrey Kate	Casey Kisses	Emma Rose	Emma Rose
Best Male Newcomer	Will Pounder	Alex	Anton Harden	Lucky Fate	Hollywood Cash
Best Actress – Featurette	Ivy Wolfe – If It Feels Right	Angela White – Seasons	Lacy Lennon – Black Widow XXX	Blake Blossom – An Honest Man	Maitland Ward – My DP 6
Best Actor – Featurette	Tommy Pistol – The Aura Doll (Future Darkly: The Complete Second Season | DVD)	Tommy Pistol – Another Life	Tommy Pistol – Second Chance	Tommy Pistol – The Bargain	Tommy Pistol – We Are Alone Now
Best Leading Actress	Angela White – Perspective	Maitland Ward – Muse	Kenna James – Under the Veil	Maitland Ward – Drift	Kira Noir – Machine Gunner
Best Leading Actor	Seth Gamble – Perspective	Seth Gamble – A Killer on the Loose	Tommy Pistol – Under the Veil	Seth Gamble – Going Up	Tommy Pistol – Feed Me
Best Supporting Actress	Maitland Ward – Drive	Kira Noir – Primary	Kira Noir – Casey: A True Story	Kira Noir – Sorrow Bay	Victoria Voxxx – Primary 3
Best Supporting Actor	Tommy Pistol – The Gang Makes a Porno: A DP XXX Parody	Xander Corvus – The Summoning	Tommy Pistol – Casey: A True Story	Tommy Pistol – Griners	Danny D – Space Junk
Female Foreign Performer of the Year	Little Caprice	Clea Gaultier	Little Caprice		Cherry Kiss
Male Foreign Performer of the Year	Danny D	Rocco Siffredi	Alberto Blanco	Danny D	Vince Karter
Director of the Year	Kayden Kross		Ricky Greenwood	Kayden Kross	Derek Dozer
Best Director – Comedic	Will Ryder – Love Emergency	Casey Calvert & Eli Cross – Cougar Queen: A Tiger King Parody	Jules Jordan – Flesh Hunter 15		
Best Director – Dramatic	Kayden Kross – Drive	Kayden Kross – Muse	Kayden Kross – Psychosexual		
Best Director – Foreign Feature	Alis Locanta – Rebecca, An Indecent Story	Hervé Bodilis – A Perfect Woman	Julia Grandi – Jia		
Best Boy/Girl Scene	Gianna Dior & Mick Blue – Unlocked (Relentless | DVD)	Maitland Ward & Pressure – Higher Power (f. Mistress Maitland), Deeper/Pulse	Gianna Dior & Troy Francisco – Psychosexual Part I, Blacked Raw/Vixen	Blake Blossom & Jax Slayher – Dream Slut, Blonde, Stacked, Blake Blossom Worships Jax Slayher's Giant Cock	Violet Myers & Chris Diamon – She Ruined Me, Deeper
Best Girl/Girl Sex Scene	Aidra Fox & Kristen Scott – Teenage Lesbian	Elsa Jean & Emily Willis – Influence Elsa Jean, Tushy	Vanna Bardot & Emily Willis – Light Me Up, Explicit Acts, Slayed	Vanna Bardot & Gianna Dior – Heat Wave	Vanna Bardot & Liz Jordan – Punch, Slayed
Best All-Girl Group Sex Scene	Riley Reid, Angela White, & Katrina Jade – I Am Riley	Emily Willis, Riley Reid, & Kristen Scott – Paranormal		Gianna Dior, Jill Kassidy, & Natalia Nix – Close Up	Blake Blossom, Vanessa Sky, Aidra Fox – Lesbian Threesome Scene 3, Sweetheart/Mile High
Most Outrageous Sex Scene	Cherie DeVille & Michael Vegas – The Ghost Rocket (Future Darkly: The Complete Second Season)	Victoria Voxxx, Julia Ann, & Steve Holmes – Move Over, Linda Blair	Scarlet Chase – Anal Slime Bath	Ashley Lane & Tommy Pistol – The Bargain	Ana Foxxx & Tommy Pistol – Raining Blood (or "Night of the Jizzed-In Dead")
MILF Performer of the Year	Alexis Fawx	Cherie DeVille	Alexis Fawx	Cherie DeVille	Penny Barber
Best All-Girl Series or Channel	Women Seeking Women, Girlfriends Films	Women Seeking Women, Girlfriends Films		Cravings, Slayed/Pulse	Touch, Slayed/Pulse
Best MILF Production	40 Years Old, Temptations of a Married Woman		Moms Teach Sex 26, Nubiles/Pulse		
Best Foreign Production	Elements	Impulses	One Night in Barcelona, Dorcel/Pulse	Revenge, Dorcel/Pulse	Missing, Dorcel/Pulse
Best Comedy	Love Emergency				Influence: Vanna Bardot
Best Web Retail Store	adultempire.com		Bellesa Boutique	PinkCherry	PinkCherry

== 2025–2029 ==
	2025	2026	2027	2028	2029
Best New Starlet	Gal Ritchie	Cheerleader Kait			
Female Performer of the Year	Anna Claire Clouds	Jennifer White			
Male Performer of the Year	Vince Karter				
Trans Performer of the Year	Brittney Kade	Aubrey Kate			
Best Male Newcomer	Chocolate God	Axel Haze			
Best Actress – Featurette	Maitland Ward – Pigeonholed	Valentina Nappi – Shamanologist			
Best Actor – Featurette	Seth Gamble – A Loving Home Environment	Tommy Pistol – Mr. Sicko and the Little Lady			
Best Leading Actress	Casey Calvert – Birth	Ryan Reid – Deadly Vows			
Best Leading Actor	Chad Alva – Alive	Tommy Pistol – Strip			
Best Supporting Actress	Chanel Camryn – Sunny Goldmelons	Chloe Surreal – Mind Games			
Best Supporting Actor	Nathan Bronson – Ulterior Motives	Ken Feels – Once Upon a Time in the Valley			
International Female Performer of the Year	Eve Sweet				
International Male Performer of the Year	Christian Clay	Marcello Bravo			
Outstanding Directing - Individual Work	Ricky Greenwood – Gold Diggers	Ricky Greenwood – Deadly Vows			
Best Directing Portfolio – Narrative	Kayden Kross	Ricky Greenwood			
Best Directing Portfolio – Non-Narrative	Jules Jordan	Jonni Darkko			
Best Directing Portfolio – International	Julia Grandi				
Best Boy/Girl Sex Scene	Angel Windell & Chris Diamond – Nine	Chanel Camryn & Milan Ponjevic – Midnight Movie			
Best Girl/Girl Sex Scene	Octavia Red & Blake Blossom – Hot Lesbian Babes Eat Each Other	Miss B Nasty & Kira Noir – Domming Her Husband's Side Piece			
Best All-Girl Group Sex Scene	Lexi Lore, Hazel Moore, Melody Marks & Little Dragon – Just Friends	Jennifer White, Anna Claire Clouds, Vanna Bardot, Blake Blossom, Lilly Bell, Octavia Red & Jewelz Blu – Performers of the Year 2025: Lesbian Orgy			
Most Outrageous Sex Scene	Valentina Nappi – Trentebeard (or Dead by Dawn)	Valentina Nappi – Shamanologist			
MILF Performer of the Year	Cherie DeVille	Lexi Luna			
Best All-Girl Series or Free-Form Line	Play, Slayed/Pulse	Escape From Camp Conversion, Girlcore/Adult Time/Pulse			
Best MILF/Female Mixed-Age Series or Free-Form Line	Moms Bang Teens, Reality Kings/Pulse	Moms Lick Teens 38, Reality Kings/Pulse			
Best International Production	Hotel Vixen Season 2, Vixen Media Group	Ghosted, Digital Playground/Pulse			
Mark Stone Award for Outstanding Comedy	American MILF, MILFY	Her Best Friend's Dad, Sweet Sinner/Mile High/Pulse			
Best Web Retail Store	AdultEmpire.com				

== Hall of Fame ==
=== Reuben Sturman Award ===
- 2000 – David Sturman, General Video of America West
- 2001 – Ed Powers, Ed Powers Productions
- 2001 – Mark Kernes, Senior Editor, AVN
- 2002 – Gloria Leonard, Past President, AVA and Free Speech Coalition
- 2002 – Elyse Metcalf, Retailer Elyse's Passion
- 2003 – Mel Kamins, General Video of America, Cleveland
- 2005 – Harry Mohney, Déjà Vu Showgirls
- 2006 – Robert and Janet Zicari, Extreme Associates
- 2007 – Paul Cambria, Clyde DeWitt and Louis Sirkin
- 2011 – John Stagliano
- 2013 – Lasse Braun

== Reception and review ==
Originally, the awards show was part of the Consumer Electronics Show (CES) in Las Vegas, but it grew and garnered more attention over time, allowing it to be established as a separate event in the 1990s. The event started out as the "Adult Software exhibition" of the show, which attracted as many as 100,000 visitors in addition to those attending CES. When the show became a separate event, it initially moved to Caesars Palace, but it has since moved to other Las Vegas venues.

The New York Times noted that the "precise criteria for winning an AVN are not, well, explicit". A writer from Los Angeles magazine wrote in 2006 that awards often go to consistent advertisers in AVN magazine. In his article, the writer stated: "Imagine the editors of Variety choosing the Academy Award nominations—then handing out Oscars to the winners—and you have a pretty good idea of how much manipulation can go on behind the scenes during the run-up to the AVNs. [...] Actresses trying to secure a nomination stop in to schmooze at the magazine's Chatsworth offices. [An agency] client once presented dolls of herself to editors and writers. Another baked cookies". Violet Blue, the sex writer, described the Awards as "big backslapping event where the same companies and same names win year after year... To think of the 'porn Oscars' as a true representation of porn's very best is like having sex with a Jenna Jameson love doll and telling your friends you had sex with the porn star".

In 2013, actress Tanya Tate offered some insights into the industry in an interview with the Huffington Post about the 30th AVN Awards at which she was nominated for an award. She stated: "If you are more popular with the fans, companies are more likely to book you for their production", "Being nominated for awards help build your recognition with your fan base. People that win male and female performer of the year are generally solid consistent talent that are open to many 'levels', and some of these performers already have higher basic rates than others".

Sports columnist Bill Simmons commented that the Awards were "the most secretly captivating telecasts on TV" alongside the National Spelling Bee and Westminster Kennel Club Dog Show. Las Vegas Weekly described the production of the telecast as "tedious" with many stops and starts, breaks, and re-dos - "Clever editing... is a porn hallmark". Michael Grecco, who filmed the 2009 Awards for his documentary Naked Ambition: An R Rated Look at an X Rated Industry, commented, "This is like covering the Mardi Gras parade. This is where people really express themselves with their full facade."

== See also ==
- Transgender Erotica Awards
- Pornhub Awards
- XBIZ Awards
- Venus Award
- Sexual Freedom Awards
- SHAFTA Awards
- F.A.M.E. Awards
- XRCO Awards
