= John Wayne Bobbitt Uncut =

1994 American pornographic film

- Box cover of the VHS release
- Directed by: Ron Jeremy
- Produced by: Marc Carriere
- Starring: John Wayne Bobbitt; Ron Jeremy; Tiffany Lords; Letha Weapons; Lemmy; Jordan St. James; Jasmin Aloha; Nikki Randall
- Cinematography: Jane Waters
- Distributed by: Leisure Time Communications
- Release date: September 29, 1994
- Running time: 77 minutes
- Country: United States
- Language: English

John Wayne Bobbitt Uncut is a 1994 American pornographic film starring John Wayne Bobbitt, directed by veteran porn actor Ron Jeremy. It won the 1995 AVN Award for both "top selling release of the year" and "top renting release of the year".

== Production ==
John Wayne Bobbitt's penis was amputated by his wife, Lorena Bobbitt, in 1993, but was surgically reattached. In 1994, Bobbitt met porn actor and director Ron Jeremy by chance at the Playboy Mansion. Bobbitt was attending a "Wet and Wild" party when he was approached by Jeremy about doing a small cameo speaking part in a pornographic film; Bobbitt was more interested in a starring role. He told Vanity Fair in 2018 that "A porno seemed like the best way to show my penis worked".

The film includes a brief appearance by Lemmy from the band Motörhead. Jeremy has said that Lemmy also contributed the song "Under the Knife" to the film's soundtrack.

The film had an invitation-only premiere on September 29, 1994, at the Academy of Motion Picture Arts and Sciences. Bobbitt nearly missed the premiere of his own film, because he had been sentenced to jail for domestic battery, but he was released pending an appeal of his conviction.

== Reception and legacy ==
Film critic Owen Gleiberman, writing for Entertainment Weekly, was one of the few mainstream critics to review the film. Gleiberman notes that, "even by conventional porn standards, it's a pretty bad movie". The Phoenix New Times published a review by Dewey Webb, who remarked on the film's "staggeringly cheesy tone", while at the same time noting the anticipated high interest of its release. In contrast, Gene Ross, writing in Adult Video News, gave it a four-N rating. Ross said the film was "destined to become XXX's all-time best seller".

Even before shooting began, the Bobbitt porno flick received more mainstream attention than any adult film in recent memory. Non-hard-core clips from the epic have even appeared on national television, including CNN.

— Dewey Webb, "New Porn Docudrama Explores John Wayne Bobbitt's Severance Package", Phoenix New Times (October 20, 1994)

Two weeks after it was released, the film was reported to have sold 40,000 copies and was at number one on AVN's chart of bestselling porn films. It went on to win the 1995 AVN awards for "top selling release of the year" and "top renting release of the year" in the United States. Bobbit was reported to have received thirty percent of the gross from each videotape sold.

Although it has been decades since the film was made, it continues to be of interest as a touchstone of the 1990s. It was reviewed for Vice by Chris Nieratko in 2009, who stated that "If Ron Jeremy is your director and he's feeding you that line of horseshit [that people want to see your penis post-reattachment], then you're an idiot and deserve a Frankencock. How long before this guy fades back into obscurity?" Feminist website Refinery29 discussed Bobbitt's porn films in 2019, after the release of Jordan Peele's documentary series Lorena, about John and Lorena Bobbitt.
