= Jumper (1991 film) =

- Front cover of a VHS release
- Directed by: Chi Chi LaRue
- Written by: Stan Ward (credited as Stan Mitchell)
- Starring: Ryan Yeager; Adam Archer; Danny Sommers; Alex Thomas; Tom Farrell; David Rockmore; Wes Daniels; Gender
- Cinematography: Joe Rock
- Edited by: Michael Zen
- Music by: Rock Hard
- Distributed by: HIS Video
- Release date: 1991
- Running time: 82 minutes
- Country: United States
- Language: English

Jumper is a 1991 American gay pornographic film directed by Chi Chi LaRue. It starred Ryan Yeager as the titular character. Written by Stan Ward (stage name Stan Mitchell), the film was originally released by HIS Video. In the film, an angel, Jumper, is sent to Earth to spend five days influencing the lives of the following men in West Hollywood, California: an aspiring model, a straight-identified man, a bickering couple, a nerd, and a Hollywood producer. The film received generally positive reception and awards, including AVN Awards and Grabby Awards.

== Plot ==
Jumper (Ryan Yeager) is an American Revolutionary War soldier who is killed at Yorktown in 1783 and becomes an angel. The voice from above whom Jumper calls "Dad" (voiced by Gender) gives Jumper five days to complete his first mission and to influence the lives of men in present-day West Hollywood.

Early in Jumper's mission he targets Jeffrey Carrington (Adam Archer), who is planning a one-night stand to advance his modeling career. Jeffrey bumps into Jumper (dressed like a bum), who keeps him from having his fling, seducing him instead at Jeffrey's apartment. While Jeffrey is asleep, Jumper gives Jeffrey his bum clothes, wears Jeffrey's, and leaves.

In Jeffrey's clothes, Jumper meets Carpenter (Danny Sommers)—an angry, straight-identifying man who dislikes gay men and resists their advances—outside a porn theater. When Carpenter enters the theater to avoid Jumper (and watch heterosexual pornography), Jumper follows him. Unaware of Jumper's nature, Carpenter cannot resist temptation and they give each other handjobs and oral sex. He brings Jumper to his motel room for more fun. While Carpenter is asleep Jumper takes his clothes, leaving him Jeffrey's. While he talks to "Dad", Jumper admits his feelings for Carpenter; however, he does not know his first name.

Invisible, Jumper meets uptight Jerry (Alex Thomas) and unemployed actor Jim (Tom Farrell), a bickering couple unaware of his presence. To help them reconcile, he uses his powers on the telephone to give Jim an acting role. Since Jerry is still angry, Jumper puts a spell on him to loosen him up enough to make up with Jim. When Jim and Jerry's lovemaking is interrupted by a phone call from Jim's mother (who accepts the couple), Jumper transports them to bed wearing only briefs and they continue uninterrupted. At the end of the scene, Jerry and Jim shower together.

Still in Carpenter's clothes, Jumper knocks on the door of nerdy Jethro's (David Rockmore) apartment (interrupting his watching gay pornography) and pretends to be a peacetime soldier in need of an apartment. When Jethro wakes up after Jumper renders him unconscious, he realizes he is naked. Jumper seduces him, and while Jethro is asleep he takes his clothes and gives him Carpenter's and Carpenter's motel address.

Jumper enters the office of closeted Hollywood producer Jay Cassidy (Wes Daniels) for an "audition". Jay resists, yet Jumper seduces him. He gives Jay a love story about two gay men, puts him to sleep, and leaves him naked. His mission complete, Jumper returns to heaven but misses West Hollywood.

As Jumper hears from "Dad", Jerry and Jim are still together despite their ups and downs; six weeks after their reconciliation, they celebrate Jim's opening night. Jeffrey and Jethro meet at one of Madonna's Blond Ambition World Tour concerts, and eventually become lovers. Although Carpenter seduces Jethro (as planned by Jumper), he still has feelings for the angel. Within a week after Jumper's journey, Carpenter is killed by gay bashers, trying to save a gay man's life. The gay love story becomes a movie directed and written by Jay.

"Dad" tells Jumper that "Dad" is whoever Jumper wants him to be. Jumper loses his wings (and his boxers, leaving him naked) and is reunited with Carpenter, who is "Dad" transformed. When he learns that Carpenter's first name is Joe, he tells him he will call him "Dad" for a while—or for eternity.

== Cast ==
- Ryan Yeager as Jumper Crane
- Danny Sommers as Joe Carpenter
- Adam Archer as Jeffrey Carrington
- Alex Thomas as Jerry
- Tom Farrell as Jim
- Wes Daniels as Jay Cassidy
- David Rockmore as Jethro
- The Fab Cizell Climax as Mrs. Grundy
- Gender as "Dad"

== Reception ==
Dave Kinnick of Adult Video News rated the film four and a half stars out of five, calling it VCA's "strongest gay title in years [and] Yeager's finest moment among many good ones to date". However, he considered it "20% too long", and criticized some technical issues in the production—he noted that one scene that was so darkly lit it was as if it were "filmed in a coal mine", and the reverb used for the voice of God [by drag performer Gender] went off and on like that of the Wizard of Oz in the 1939 film. Jeffrey Escoffier, in his book Bigger Than Life, described the screenplay as a "well-developed [one] that requires some degree of acting in addition to skills as an adult performer", and thought the film was "modeled somewhat" on Heaven Can Wait.

In 1992, it won AVN Awards for Best Gay Video and Best Actor in a Gay Video (Ryan Yeager), the Gay Erotic Video Awards for Best Screenplay (Stan Ward) and Best Supporting Actor (Danny Sommers), and the Grabby Awards for Best Screenplay (Ward).
