= Alban Ceray =

Monegasque pornographic actor

- Born: 3 January 1945 (age 80); Monaco
- Occupation: Actor

Alban Ceray (born 3 January 1945) is a Monegasque pornographic actor. His career spans over 30 years, from the Golden Age of French porn in the 1970s to the Internet era in the early 2000s.

== Early life and career ==
Ceray is a Monegasque citizen and now lives in the principality. An orphan, he was adopted by a rich family in Beausoleil, a French town bordering Monaco, and he inherited from his parents at a very young age and had to manage the family patrimony. His inexperience quickly led to being cheated and ruined. He has dabbled various trades, experiencing great difficulties before starting his career in hardcore pornography in the mid-1970s. Having moved to Paris to open an antique shop at the bottom of the Rue Saint-Denis, he had as a neighbor of his store one of the first erotic theaters of Paris, the Saint-Denis Theatre. Ceray was closing his shop when his neighbor was opening his. His neighbor came to dinner at a restaurant that faced their two shops. The director of the theater arrived with a defeated face and said: "The couple that performs on stage tonight, the man is angry and will not come ...". Ceray offered jokingly to replace him. "You would do that for me? If the actress is okay?"

No sooner said than done, with the agreement of the young woman, Ceray found himself on stage. He performed on stage all week until, on Saturday evening, José Bénazéraf, the producer-director of X-rated films in the 1970s, came to watch the show. At the end of that evening, Ceray was asked if he would agree to perform in Bénazéraf's next film in the role of a butler. This was the beginning of a career of more than 500 movies. He became one of the most familiar faces in French cinema X. He became a bartender in the mid-1980s and more active in the swingers club "Le 106". He then became the manager of his own swingers club, "Le Clos Palissy" (on Bernard-Palissy street behind the former Drugstore Saint-Germain), while still performing occasionally.

In 2003, he was in Virginie, performing alongside French actors Manuel Ferrara and HPG, as well as the Czech actress Laura Angel.

He has performed with Traci Lords, Brigitte Lahaie, and many others, and he is a longtime friend with his partner Richard Allan. He retired after making over 500 films.

In 2011, he starred in the film DXK, inspired by New York v. Strauss-Kahn.

== Bibliography ==
- Du lit au divan - Alban Ceray - Table ronde Ed. 1992 - ISBN 2-7103-0519-4

== Partial filmography ==
- 1976 - Mains douces et lèvres chaudes by Henri Sala
- 1976 - La Comtesse Ixe (or Sueurs chaudes) by Jean Rollin
- 1976 - Amours Collectives by Jean-Pierre Bouyxou
- 1977 - Qui m'aime me suce by Maxime de Best
- 1977 - La fille à la fourrure (or Le délire des sens) by Claude Pierson
- 1977 - Belles d'un soir by Frédéric Lansac
- 1977 - Parties fines by Gérard Kikoïne (with Brigitte Lahaie in the lead role)
- 1977 - Jouir jusqu'au délire by Gérard Vernier
- 1977 - Insomnies sous les tropiques by Claude Mulot (as Frédéric Lansac)
- 1977 - Les Plaisirs fous by Jean Desvilles (as Georges Fleury)
- 1977 - Helga, la louve de Stilberg by Patrice Rhomm
- 1979 - Les Soirées d'un couple voyeur by Jean-Claude Roy (as Patrick Aubin)
- 1979 - Accouplements pour voyeurs by Jean-Claude Roy (as Patrick Aubin)
- 1980 - Les Petites Écolières by Claude Mulot (as Frédéric Lansac)
- 1982 - Attention, fillettes (Dans le Chaleur de St.Tropez) by Gérard Kikoïne
- 1983 - Le lit d'Elodie by Marc Dorcel
- 1984 - La Maison des 1001 plaisirs by Michel Leblanc
- 1987 - Diamond Baby by Michael Goritschnig (as Michel Jean)
- 1987 - Traci, I Love You by Jean-Pierre Floran
- 1985 - Le Fruit défendu
- 1994 - Les Visiteuses
- 2007 - Le Camping des foutriquets
- 2011 - Hard - season 2 episode 11 (as himself)
- 2011 - DXK by Christoph Clark
