= Angelina Please =

American pornographic film actress (1997–2022)

- Born: 1997 or 1998; Chicago, Illinois, U.S.
- Died: March 11, 2022 (aged 24); Las Vegas, Nevada, U.S.
- Occupation: Pornographic film actress
- Years active: 2019–2022

Francesca Elizabeth Montalbano (1997 or 1998 – March 11, 2022), known professionally as Angelina Please, was an American transgender pornographic film actress. A part of the adult film industry from 2019 to 2022, she was nominated for multiple industry awards before and after her death.

== Life and career ==
Montalbano was originally from Chicago and began her pornographic film career in 2019. She said in December 2021 that she had reunited with her grandmother and mother after a long estrangement. Shortly before her death on March 11, 2022, she paid for fellow performer Gracie Jane's best friend to undergo rehabilitation for her drug addiction; Jane later credited Montalbano with saving her friend's life. Throughout her three-year tenure in the industry, she was nominated for a Transgender Erotica Award every year she was eligible. She had similarly been nominated for AVN and Fleshbot Awards.

After her death, Casey Kisses, who had appeared in previous films with Montalbano, praised her acting abilities and stated that she believed Montalbano was likely to become an award-winner. Gracie Jane, a close friend of Montalbano's, paid tribute to her in her 2023 Transgender Erotica Award acceptance speech. After Montalbano's death, scenes she had shot beforehand – "Porn Crush #03" and "It's a Trans Sandwich (And I'm the Meat!) #02" – were nominated for the Fleshbot Awards' "Trans - Movie of the Year" in 2022 and 2023.

According to her family, Montalbano had struggled with methamphetamine, later moving on to party drugs. Two weeks before her death, she had filmed a scene with Casey Kisses, who stated that Montalbano seemed "normal" and "cheery". It was estimated by friends that Montalbano had shot around 10 scenes in the weeks leading up to her death. After she had not been heard from for five days, her neighbor, fellow pornographic film actress Aspen Brooks, appealed for information on Twitter about her safety. The Las Vegas Metropolitan Police reportedly found Montalbano's body, determining there was no signs of foul play. Her death was subsequently confirmed by Brooks. After Montalbano's death, her older sibling Lonnie set up a GoFundMe to pay for her remains to be returned to Chicago.

Many paid tribute to Montalbano in the wake of her death. These included her friends, including Brooks and another porn actress, Kylie Le Beau, as well as filmmaker Steven Grooby, founder of Grooby Productions.
