= Savannah Bond =

Australian pornographic film actress (born 1990 or 1991)

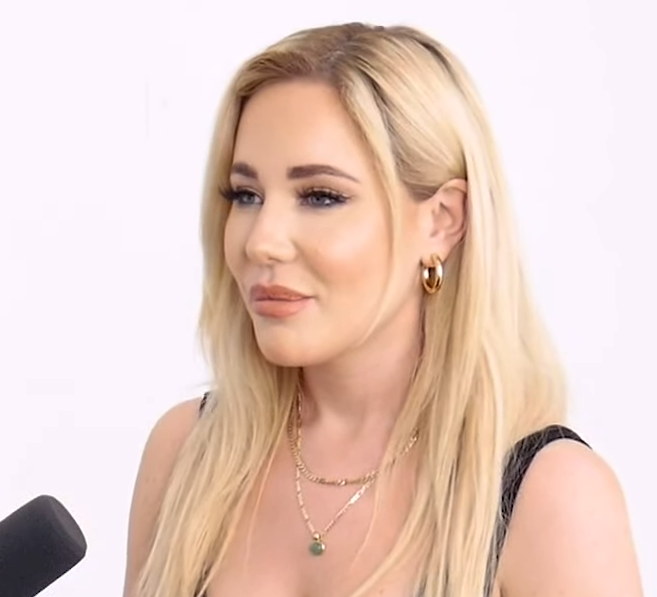
- Bond in 2022
- Born: 1990 or 1991; Melbourne, Victoria, Australia
- Occupation: Pornographic film actress

Savannah Bond (born 1990 or 1991) is an Australian pornographic film actress.

== Early life ==
Bond grew up in Melbourne, where she studied beauty therapy and worked in retail. Bond later worked as a stripper in Melbourne and Sydney, and eventually moved to Townsville, Queensland.

== Career ==
In 2019, Bond started working in the adult film industry. She began with Jules Jordan in Los Angeles and spent her first two months in the industry working solely for Jordan's company. By the end of the year, Bond had accumulated over 30 acting credits. She starred alongside Angela White and Gia Derza in Savannah Bond Beach Bikini Slut, released by Evil Angel in 2021.

After the lifting of travel restrictions in Australia, Bond moved to Los Angeles, where she established herself as a regular performer in adult films. In 2022, Bond was featured in a BANG! exclusive movie Flawless Tits 7 with fellow performer Zac Wild. She appeared in over 50 films in 2022, including for Jules Jordan. Bond was selected by Cherry Pimps as their model of the month for April 2022. That same month she appeared on Holly Randall's Unfiltered podcast for a 53 minute segment discussing her career thus far. She has also been featured in movies produced by Vixen Media Group and Ricky's Room.

In May 2025 during the 7th Annual Pornhub Awards in Los Angeles, Savannah Bond was nominated in 2 different categories, Hottest Ass and Favorite BBW respectively.

During the 2026 AVN Awards, Bond was the winner of the Best MILF Movie/Series category.

=== Awards ===
- 2021 Fleshbot Award – Movie of the Year – Savannah Bond: Beach Bikini Slut
- 2022 AVN Award – Best Blowbang Scene – Savannah Bond: Beach Bikini Slut
- 2022 Urban X Award – Urban X Hottie
- 2022 Fleshbot Award – Best Group Sex Scene – The Gangbang of Savannah Bond
- 2023 AVN Award – Best Foursome/Orgy Scene – Blacked Raw V56
- 2023 XBIZ Award – Best Sex Scene - Vignette – Blacked Raw V56
- 2023 Adult Empire Award – Porn Clip of the Year – Double Anal Angels
- 2024 Pornhub Award – Top DP Performer
- 2026 AVN Award - Best MILF Movie or Series

== Personal life ==
In 2020, Bond said that her parents were supportive of her career, but that her older brother no longer talked to her.
