= Brittney Kade =

American pornographic film actress

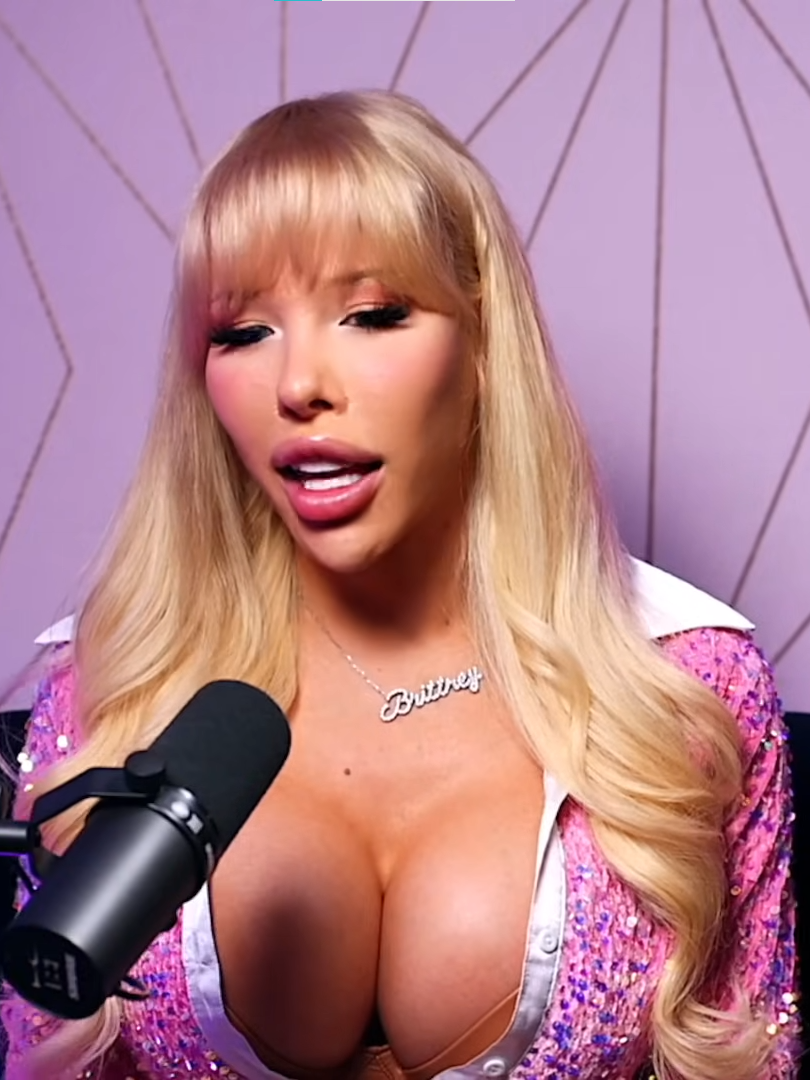
- Kade in 2025
- Occupation: Pornographic film actress

Brittney Kade is an American transgender pornographic film actress. She received the AVN Award for Transgender Performer of the Year in 2025.

== Career ==
=== Pornographic films ===
Kade has received multiple adult film industry awards including an Adult Empire Award in 2026, a NightMoves Award in 2024, and a Transgender Erotica Award in 2022. She was also awarded Best Trans Newcomer at the 2023 AVN Awards and Transgender Performer of the Year at the 2025 AVN Awards.

AEBN ranked Kade as one of the top-selling transgender adult film actresses in 2024.

=== Mainstream appearances ===
In 2025, Kade appeared in the music video for "Bands On Me" by Chase Icon, who is herself transgender. Icon described Kade as the Maddie Ziegler to my Sia"
