= Alexis Fawx =

American pornographic film actress

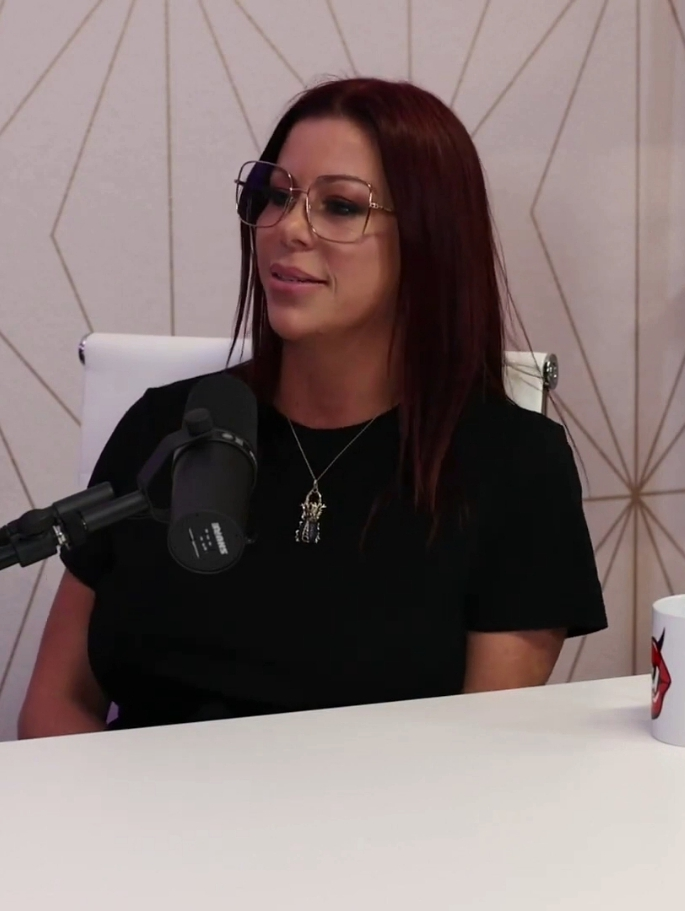
- Fawx in 2023
- Occupation: Pornographic film actress
- Years active: 2010–present

Alexis Fawx is an American pornographic film actress.

== Career ==
Before entering the adult film industry, Fawx joined the United States Air Force and worked as a paralegal. She was selected as the Girlsway Girl of the Month for March 2017.

In 2018, Fawx was ranked as the fourth-most searched straight actor by AEBN, and was ranked in the top 10 of searches in 2022. That same year, she signed a 12-month exclusive deal with Mile High Media. Fawx signed an exclusive contract with Brazzers in 2020, who she has praised for their receptiveness to her ideas. Fawx was inducted into the Brazzers Hall of Fame in 2024.

Having begun her career in her 30s, Fawx stated that this led her to being frequently cast into 'MILF' roles, with her first appearance in the archetype being in the film MILF Soup. This would bring significant notability for Fawx within the industry, and she won the 2022 XBIZ Award for 'MILF Performer in the Year' and the 2024 Award for 'MILF Premium Social Media Star of the Year'. She has also hosted the 2022 XRCO Awards and won XMA Awards. Fawx won the AVN Award for MILF Performer of the Year in 2020 and 2022, as well as the 'Best Foursome/Orgy' Award in 2025.

Fawx also sells content on OnlyFans and FanCentro as well as NFTs. Fawx films vlogs and hosts a podcast, High as Fawx, which she co-hosts with her best friend Asian Joe, discussing matters including Fawx's personal life to her passion for cannabis. The podcast also has an associated coffee brand, High AF Coffee. Between April and June 2020, amidst the COVID-19 pandemic, Fawx pledged all proceeds to the Frontline Responders Fund.

In March 2025, Alexis appeared on The Brazzers Podcast 2 along with fellow United States Armed Forces veteran star Kayley Gunner.

== Awards ==
- 2019 NightMoves Award – Best Body (Editor's Choice)
- 2020 XCritic Award – Best MILF
- 2020 AVN Award – MILF Performer of the Year
- 2020 Spank Bank Award – Magnificent MILF of the Year
- 2021 NightMoves Award – Best MILF Performer (Fan's Choice)
- 2022 XBIZ Award – MILF Performer of the Year
- 2022 AVN Award – MILF Performer of the Year
- 2023 Fleshbot Award – Best MILF
- 2024 XBIZ Creator Award – MILF Premium Social Media Star of the Year
- 2025 XMA Award – Best Sex Scene - Orgy/Group – Brazzers Presents: 20 For 20
- 2025 AVN Award – Best Foursome/Orgy Scene – Brazzers Presents: 20 For 20
- 2025 XMA Creator Award – MILF Premium Social Media Star of the Year
- 2025 XMA Creator Award – Trans Collab Clip of the Year
