= Jim Steel (director) =

American pornographic film director and producer

- Born: April 24, 1958
- Died: November 5, 2014 (aged 56); Palm Springs
- Other names: J Steel, James Steel, Patrick Dennis, Scott Parisi

Jim Steel (April 24, 1958 – November 5, 2014) was an American director, writer, production manager and producer of pornography. He was an inductee of the Grabby Awards Hall of Fame and the GayVN Awards Hall of Fame.

== Adult film career ==
Steel's career dates back to the late 1980s. He is well known in the gay adult film industry as "the only person in this business today who understands how to mix comedy and sex..." He worked continuously through 2009 in various capacities.

Steel was once half of the producing team known in adult film as "Patrick Dennis." His first breakout hit was Davey and the Cruisers. He later directed the popular "Rites" series for HIS Video (Rites of Summer, Rites of Spring, Rites of Winter, and Rites of Fall), and the "Pay to Play" series of films. By 1994, he had produced or directed more than 140 films.

Later works included a stint with Falcon Studios as well as the revived HIS Video label and the revived Men of Odyssey label.

He was primarily known for his work in the Gay Pornography market, but worked consistently in both gay and straight adult video. He occasionally played nonsexual cameos in the films he produced.

== Awards ==
Jim Steel was inducted into the Grabby Awards Hall of Fame in 1999 and the GayVN Awards Hall of Fame in 2005.

== Cameo appearances ==
- French Connection 1: Temptation (Falcon Studios, 1998)
- Conquest (Wicked Pictures, 1997)
- Jock-a-Holics (Sierra Pacific/Tyger Films, 1993)
- Lost In Vegas (All World's Video, 1993)

== Selected producing filmography (gay) ==
- Tulsa County Line (Men of Odyssey, 2001)
- Top Secret (Men of Odyssey, 2000)
- Caesar's Hard Hat Gang Bang (Men of Odyssey, 2000)
- Echoes (Men of Odyssey, 2000)
- Technical Ecstasy (Men of Odyssey, 1999)
- Mass Appeal (Men of Odyssey, 1998)
- Pick Up (Vivid Man, 1995)

== Selected directing filmography (gay) ==
- Teacher's Pet (HIS Video, 2007)
- Devil Inside (HIS Video, 2006)
- Up All Night (Falcon Studios, 2005)
- Mass Appeal 2 (Men of Odyssey, 2002)
- The Joint (Men of Odyssey, 2001)
- Carnal Intentions (Men of Odyssey, 2001)
- Uniform Ball #1: The Blue Collar Edition (Hard As Steel Productions, Vivid, 2001)
- The Journey Back (Men of Odyssey, 2000)
- Ryker's Revenge (Men of Odyssey, 1998)
- Dreaming in Blue (Vivid Man, 1998)
- Uniform Ball #2: The Military Edition (Hard As Steel Productions, Vivid, 1998)
- Hollywood Knights (Vivid Man, 1997)
- Men's Room (Vivid Man, 1996)
- A Night with Todd Stevens (Vivid Man, 1996)
- Pure (Vivid Man, 1996)
- Rescue 69-11 (Vivid Man, 1996)
- Crossroads (Vivid Man, 1993)
- Memories of Summer (Hard As Steel Productions, Vivid, 1992)
- The Return of Grant Fagin (Vivid Man, 1991)

== See also ==
- List of male performers in gay porn films
- List of pornographic movie studios
- List of Grabby recipients

== Sources ==
- Johnson, Peter. "Falcon Names New Directors." Adult Video News. February 11, 2005. Accessed November 30, 2007.
- "LFP Revives HIS Brand With The Devil Inside." Adult Video News. September 25, 2006. Accessed November 30, 2007.
- Richards, Rick. "Men of Odyssey Returns Under Bob East." Adult Video News. March 26, 2007. Accessed November 30, 2007.
- Spencer, William. "On the Set With Jim Steel." Manshots. February 1995.

GayVN Awards Hall of Fame
2005
