= Yasmin Lee =

American pornographic actress

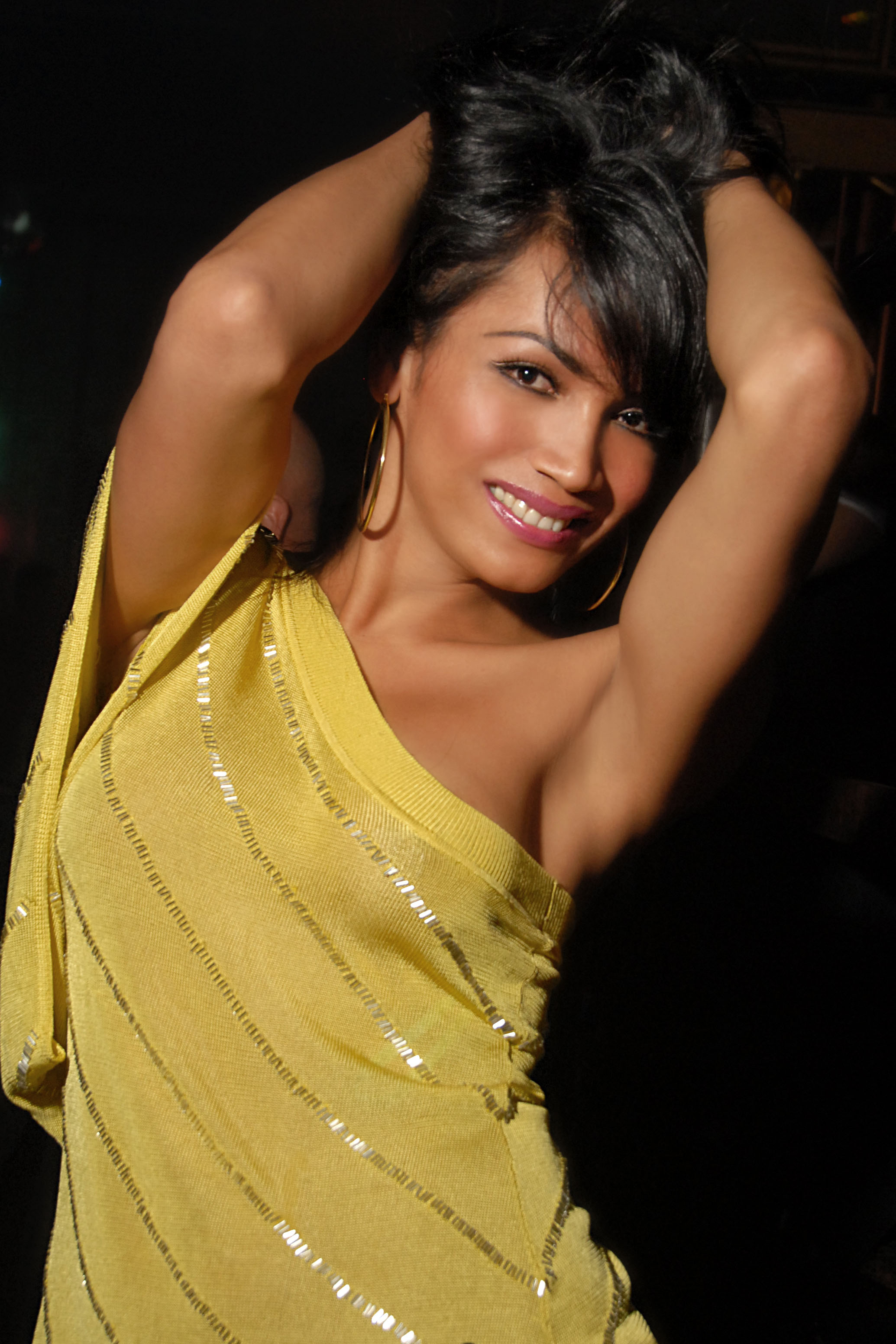
Lee attending "Fetish Nation" Party at Circus Disco, Hollywood, CA, September 2006

Yasmin Lee (born 1983 or 1984) is an American transgender pornographic film actress and model. She appeared in the film The Hangover Part II as Kimmy.

== Early life and career ==
Lee lived with her family in various refugee camps in Cambodia (due to the Khmer Rouge and the then-ongoing Cambodian genocide) before emigrating to the United States. She joined the U.S. Navy at age 18 but was honorably discharged within a year under the "don't ask, don't tell" policy after Lee reported another sailor for mocking her sexual orientation. Lee moved to Los Angeles, where she pursued a career as a make-up artist for The Pussycat Dolls, acting as a drag performer on the side, ultimately transitioning at age 21. She has twice been nominated for an AVN Award for her work in transgender pornography.

She was a regular performer at Kink.com and she won in 2011 the "Kinkiest TGirl Domme" Award.

=== Mainstream appearances ===
Lee made her way into mainstream roles with special appearances on various TV shows, including The Maury Povich Show and The Tyra Banks Show. She appeared in the 2011 horror film Red Ice, the 2011 comedy The Hangover Part II, and the 2019 romance Loves Me, Loves Me Not.

=== Activism ===
In 2011, Lee appeared in a panel discussion on LGBT rights with the American Civil Liberties Union.

== Awards and nominations ==
- 2008 AVN Award nomination – Transsexual Performer of the Year
- 2009 AVN Award nomination – Transsexual Performer of the Year
