= Traci, I Love You =

1987 film

- Directed by: Jean-Pierre Floran
- Produced by: Traci Lords
- Edited by: Michael Zen
- Music by: Michael Beat
- Distributed by: Caballero Home Video
- Release date: December 1987
- Running time: 74 minutes
- Language: English

Traci, I Love You is a 1987 pornographic film directed by Jean Charles and starring Traci Lords, Marilyn Jess, Gabriel Pontello and Alban Ceray. It was Lords's final adult film in the industry. It was produced in Cannes, France, two days after her eighteenth birthday. As her only film produced after she turned 18, it is the only one legally available in the United States, due to child pornography laws.

The film has been another aspect of controversy to Lords's life. It was the third and final film by her then self-titled production company (Traci Lords Company). She had sold the rights for a reported $100,000, profiting from her former profession post-scandal, while consistently regretting making adult films and criticizing the porn industry. In her 2003 autobiography, Underneath It All, she explained her actions:

I sold that fucking movie for a period of ten years and with it bought myself some shelter from the storm. It was an agonizing decision, and one that made me a harder person, but it had to be done. I hated the fact that I made it possible for someone to go into a video store and rent it. But selling that film gave me some control over my life.

She regained the rights to the film in 1996 and has not allowed it to be sold, though old copies are still available in used markets.

== Plot ==
In the film, Lords is the reigning queen of "good girl gone bad." This is a story of a glamour photographer's fixation with a beautiful model named Traci. A French film festival is the setting, where Traci arrives and gets the attention of photographers. She gets the special attention of Jean-Paul (Gabriel Pontello), who sees her as his favorite nude model. Jean Paul finds Traci to be the very essence of sensuality. She finally agrees to pose for him and they begin a love affair, where he helps her to explore her sexuality through his underworld connections in the Arena of Pleasure. Traci discovers true love and the ultimate sex adventure.

First, Traci has sex with a casting agent. She becomes a topless dancer, and Jean-Paul secretly watches in the audience. Off stage, she gets a necklace from Jean-Paul with her name engraved, which makes her remember another sexual encounter. On that night, with an audience watching, she ends up in an orgy with Leanna, Diana, Monique (Marilyn Jess) and a group of strange men dressed in all black. Jean-Paul watches from the audience before joining. Traci's presence arouses the audience members who finally get involved. After remembering, Traci takes the necklace to meet Jean-Paul in a car. He puts his gift around her neck, then Traci opens her legs to reveal she is not wearing any panties.

== Cast ==
- Alban Ceray as "Mr. Alisair"
- Marilyn Jess as "Monique"
- Alain L'Yle as "Blond man" (uncredited)
- Traci Lords as "Traci"
- Gabriel Pontello as "Jean-Paul"
