= Casey Kisses =

American pornographic film actress

- Occupation: Pornographic film actress
- Years active: 2014–present

Casey Kisses is an American transgender pornographic film actress.

== Life and career ==
In an interview with AVN, Kisses stated that she first began having gender dysphoria at a young age, and that she was unable to express these feelings to her parents due to their abusive and violent actions. She grew up in the Miami neighborhood of Little Haiti, where Kisses stated she did not feel comfortable expressing these feelings to her peers. During her youth, she was also involved in a motorcycle gang, though she was kicked out after it was discovered that she was homosexual. Her early life was the subject of the Adult Time film Casey: A True Story, which was directed by Joanna Angel.

Kisses began working multiple jobs, and stated that she realized she was transgender after seeing a YouTube which she heavily resonated with. When Kisses was 24, she was in a car accident which left her unable to walk for multiple months. Though she was unable to work and had to live with her aunt in Panama City, Kisses began her venture into camming, which she began doing full-time in 2015.

Moving to Las Vegas in 2016 to join the adult film industry, Kisses has won a significant number of awards, as well as being the cover star of the Grooby Productions magazine Grooby Girls in November 2019. One of the most prestigious was her achieving the AVN Award for Transgender Performer of the Year in 2022, coinciding with her winning 'Trans Performer of the Year' at that year's XRCO Awards. She has also won other AVN, Fleshbot, and Transgender Erotica awards. Kisses has frequently partnered with Kylie Le Beau in scenes, and the duo won an XMA Award for 'Streamer Duo of the Year' in 2026. Kisses has praised the improvement of how the trans community is treated in the adult film industry, though stating her belief that the industry still needed to improve further.

Other than her awards, Kisses has repeatedly ranked as one of the most-searched transgender adult film actors in the 2020s. She had also performed on Chaturbate in 2020, giving the proceeds to fellow performer Peppermint, who had been diagnosed with breast cancer.
