= Emma Rose (actress) =

American pornographic film actress

- Occupations: Pornographic film actress; activist
- Years active: 2020–present

Emma Rose is an American transgender pornographic film actress and activist who has won multiple industry awards as well as criticizing black market surgeries within the adult film industry and the fetishization of transgender women.

== Life and career ==
Rose transitioned in 2017, stating that she has spent over US$100,000 on surgeries as of 2023. She began her career in the adult film industry in 2020, signing an exclusive contract with TransAngels in 2021 and became an Adult Time ambassador in 2024.

Rose was selected as the 'Trans Performer of the Year' at the 40th AVN Awards, and has won multiple nominations as well. She has won other industry awards throughout her career, including AltStar, Fleshbot, Pornhub, Transgender Erotica, and XRCO awards.

=== Activism ===
Rose has been outspoken in her activism about black market surgeries for transgender pornographic actors, stating that she had gotten two surgeries to inject silicone in her buttocks, and that complications have made it difficult to sit as likely needing a Blood transfusion. She has described these surgeries as a 'well-known secret' in the industry, and that she has discouraged other actresses from getting the same surgery.

She has also criticized the fetishization of transgender women by people who are against trans rights.
