= AVN Award for Best Supporting Actress =

Pornographic film award category

- Awarded for: Best Supporting Actress
- Country: United States
- Presented by: AVN Media Network
- First award: 1984
- Currently held by: Chloe Surreal
- Website: avnawards.avn.com

The AVN Award for Best Supporting Actress is an award that has been given by sex industry company AVN since the award ceremony's inception in 1984. As of January 2026, the titleholder is Chloe Surreal.

== Winners and nominees ==
=== 1984–1989 ===
Year	Photo	Winner Film	Nominees Films
1984		Tiffany Clark; Hot Dreams	
1985		Lisa De Leeuw; Dixie Ray, Hollywood Star	
1986		Lisa De Leeuw; Raw Talent	
1987		Colleen Brennan (f); Star Angel	
1988		Tish Ambrose (f); Firestorm II	
1989		Nina Hartley (f); Portrait of an Affair	
1989		Jacqueline Lorains (v); Beauty & the Beast	

=== 1990–1994 ===
Year	Photo	Winner Film	Nominees Films
1990		Viper; Mystery of the Golden Lotus	
1991		Deidre Holland (f); Veil	
1991		Nina Hartley (v); The Last X-Rated Movie	
1992		Britt Morgan (f); On Trial	
1992		Selena Steele (v); Sirens	
1993		Ona Zee; The Secret Garden (f)	
1993		Melanie Moore (v); The Party	
1994		Tianna (f); Justine	
1994		Porsche Lynn (v); Servin' It Up	

=== 1995–1999 ===
Year	Photo	Winner Film	Nominees Films
1995		Tiffany Million (f); Sex	
1995		Kaitlyn Ashley (v); Shame	
1996		Ariana (f); Desert Moon	
1996		Jeanna Fine (v); Dear Diary	
1997		Shanna McCullough (f); Bobby Sox	
1997		Juli Ashton (v); Head Trip	
1998		Melissa Hill (f); Bad Wives	
1998		Jeanna Fine (v); Miscreants	
1999		Chloe (f); The Masseuse 3	
1999		Katie Gold (v); Pornogothic	

=== 2000–2004 ===
Year	Photo	Winner Film	Nominees Films
2000		Janine Lindemulder (f); Seven Deadly Sins	Melissa Hill; Nothing to Hide 3 & 4
2000		Janine Lindemulder (f); Seven Deadly Sins	Misty Rain; Things Change 3
2000		Janine Lindemulder (f); Seven Deadly Sins	Regan Starr; Seven Deadly Sins
2000		Janine Lindemulder (f); Seven Deadly Sins	Sydnee Steele; The Trophy
2000		Janine Lindemulder (f); Seven Deadly Sins	Kobe Tai; The Awakening
2000		Janine Lindemulder (f); Seven Deadly Sins	Inari Vachs; Three
2000		Shanna McCullough (v); Double Feature!	
2000		Shanna McCullough (v); Double Feature!	Chloe; Torn
2000		Shanna McCullough (v); Double Feature!	Dee; Revenge
2000		Shanna McCullough (v); Double Feature!	Kylie Ireland; The 69th Parallel
2000		Shanna McCullough (v); Double Feature!	Tracy Love; L.A. 399
2000		Shanna McCullough (v); Double Feature!	Missy; The Kissing Game
2000		Shanna McCullough (v); Double Feature!	Coral Sands; Crossroads
2000		Shanna McCullough (v); Double Feature!	Stephanie Swift; Desiree
2000		Shanna McCullough (v); Double Feature!	Tina Tyler; The Devil in Miss Jones
2001		Chloe (f); True Blue	Julia Ann; Secret Party
2001		Chloe (f); True Blue	Bridgette Kerkove; Watchers
2001		Chloe (f); True Blue	Shanna McCullough; Looker 2: Femme Fatale
2001		Chloe (f); True Blue	Sydnee Steele; A Midsummer Night's Cream
2001		Chloe (f); True Blue	Ava Vincent; Adrenaline
2001		Midori (v); American Booty	
2001		Midori (v); American Booty	Alexa; Partners Forever
2001		Midori (v); American Booty	Juli Ashton; Best Friends
2001		Midori (v); American Booty	Chloe; White Lightning
2001		Midori (v); American Booty	Jeanna Fine; Ooze
2001		Midori (v); American Booty	Bridgette Kerkove; Out of Control
2001		Midori (v); American Booty	Anna Malle; A Witch's Tail
2001		Midori (v); American Booty	Sonja Redd; Goddaughter 5
2001		Midori (v); American Booty	Tabitha Stevens; Bride of Double Feature
2001		Midori (v); American Booty	Gwen Summers; Trailer Trash Nurses
2001		Midori (v); American Booty	Keri Windsor; The Collector
2002		Julie Meadows (f); Fade to Black	April; Bad Wives 2
2002		Julie Meadows (f); Fade to Black	Nikita Denise; Rapunzel
2002		Julie Meadows (f); Fade to Black	Kylie Ireland; Bad Wives 2
2002		Julie Meadows (f); Fade to Black	Heather Lyn; Free Sex on Earth
2002		Julie Meadows (f); Fade to Black	Shanna McCullough; Mafioso
2002		Julie Meadows (f); Fade to Black	Sydnee Steele; Marissa
2002		Ava Vincent (v); Succubus	Diana DeVoe; Disturbed
2002		Ava Vincent (v); Succubus	Kylie Ireland; Vengeance
2002		Ava Vincent (v); Succubus	Kelsey; Destiny Calling
2002		Ava Vincent (v); Succubus	Bridgette Kerkove; The Gate
2002		Ava Vincent (v); Succubus	Inari Vachs; Dead Men Don't Wear Rubbers
2002		Ava Vincent (v); Succubus	Zana; XXX Training
2003		Belladonna (f); Fashionistas	Adajja; Love Games
2003		Belladonna (f); Fashionistas	Rebecca Bardoux; Heartbreaker
2003		Belladonna (f); Fashionistas	T.J. Hart; Poison Angel
2003		Belladonna (f); Fashionistas	Sharon Kane; Heartbreaker
2003		Belladonna (f); Fashionistas	Caroline Pierce; Fashionistas
2003		Belladonna (f); Fashionistas	Misty Rain; Les Vampyres 2
2003		Belladonna (f); Fashionistas	Gwen Summers; Wifetaker
2003		Sydnee Steele (v); Breathless	April; Something So Right
2003		Sydnee Steele (v); Breathless	Violet Blue; Karma
2003		Sydnee Steele (v); Breathless	Asia Carrera; My Father's Wife
2003		Sydnee Steele (v); Breathless	Nikita Denise; I Dream of Jenna
2003		Sydnee Steele (v); Breathless	Wendy Divine; Jolean and the Pussycats
2003		Sydnee Steele (v); Breathless	Haven; Out of Control 2
2003		Sydnee Steele (v); Breathless	Brooke Hunter; Sinful Rella
2003		Sydnee Steele (v); Breathless	Devinn Lane; Turning Point
2003		Sydnee Steele (v); Breathless	Aurora Snow; In & Out of Beverly Hills
2003		Sydnee Steele (v); Breathless	Ava Vincent; Heartbreaker
2004		Dru Berrymore (f); Heart of Darkness	Sunrise Adams; Heart of Darkness
2004		Dru Berrymore (f); Heart of Darkness	Julie Meadows; Mirror Image
2004		Dru Berrymore (f); Heart of Darkness	Ava Vincent; Heart of Darkness
2004		Brooke Ballentyne (v); Rawhide	Briana Banks; Tricks
2004		Brooke Ballentyne (v); Rawhide	Asia Carrera; Angel X
2004		Brooke Ballentyne (v); Rawhide	Stormy Daniels; Beautiful
2004		Brooke Ballentyne (v); Rawhide	Jessica Drake; About a Woman
2004		Brooke Ballentyne (v); Rawhide	Brooke Hunter; Truck Stop Trixie
2004		Brooke Ballentyne (v); Rawhide	Jenna Haze; Screwless
2004		Brooke Ballentyne (v); Rawhide	Kaylynn; Sweet 101
2004		Brooke Ballentyne (v); Rawhide	Bridgette Kerkove; Improper Conduct
2004		Brooke Ballentyne (v); Rawhide	Devinn Lane; Space Nuts
2004		Brooke Ballentyne (v); Rawhide	Ann Marie Rios; Sweet 101
2004		Brooke Ballentyne (v); Rawhide	Sydnee Steele; Kink

=== 2005–2009 ===
Year	Photo	Winner Film	Nominees Films
2005		Lezley Zen (f); Bare Stage	Violet Blue; The 8th Sin
2005		Lezley Zen (f); Bare Stage	Dasha; The 8th Sin
2005		Lezley Zen (f); Bare Stage	Wendy Divine; The Masseuse
2005		Ashley Blue (v); Adore	
2005		Ashley Blue (v); Adore	Asia Carrera; Sweatshop
2005		Ashley Blue (v); Adore	Chloe; Misty Beethoven: The Musical
2005		Ashley Blue (v); Adore	Stormy Daniels; Suspicious Minds
2005		Ashley Blue (v); Adore	Jessica Drake; Killer Sex & Suicide Blondes
2005		Ashley Blue (v); Adore	Michelle Michaels; Happily Never After
2005		Ashley Blue (v); Adore	Katie Morgan; High Desert Pirates
2005		Ashley Blue (v); Adore	Rachel Rotten; Café Flesh 3
2005		Ashley Blue (v); Adore	Brittney Skye; Payback
2005		Ashley Blue (v); Adore	Lezley Zen; Fluff & Fold
2006		Jenna Jameson (f); The New Devil in Miss Jones	Jessica Drake; Eternity
2006		Jenna Jameson (f); The New Devil in Miss Jones	Roxanne Hall; Les Bitches
2006		Jenna Jameson (f); The New Devil in Miss Jones	T. J. Hart; Scorpio Rising
2006		Jenna Jameson (f); The New Devil in Miss Jones	Nicki Hunter; Two Hot
2006		Jenna Jameson (f); The New Devil in Miss Jones	Jennifer Luv; Scorpio Rising
2006		Stormy Daniels (v); Camp Cuddly Pines Powertool Massacre	
2006		Stormy Daniels (v); Camp Cuddly Pines Powertool Massacre	Nikki Benz; Jack’s Teen America 2
2006		Stormy Daniels (v); Camp Cuddly Pines Powertool Massacre	Jessica Drake; Camp Cuddly Pines Powertool Massacre
2006		Stormy Daniels (v); Camp Cuddly Pines Powertool Massacre	Audrey Hollander; Desperate Wives 2
2006		Stormy Daniels (v); Camp Cuddly Pines Powertool Massacre	Kimberly Kane; Polarity
2006		Stormy Daniels (v); Camp Cuddly Pines Powertool Massacre	Jennifer Luv; Taboo 21
2006		Stormy Daniels (v); Camp Cuddly Pines Powertool Massacre	Marie Luv; Jack’s Teen America 7
2006		Stormy Daniels (v); Camp Cuddly Pines Powertool Massacre	Missy Monroe; Debbie Goes to Rehab
2006		Stormy Daniels (v); Camp Cuddly Pines Powertool Massacre	Haley Paige; Prisoner
2006		Stormy Daniels (v); Camp Cuddly Pines Powertool Massacre	Lauren Phoenix; The Edge Runner
2007		Kirsten Price (f); Manhunters	Dasha; Emperor
2007		Kirsten Price (f); Manhunters	Exotica; Manhunters
2007		Kirsten Price (f); Manhunters	Liza Harper; To Die For
2007		Kirsten Price (f); Manhunters	Carmen Hart; Manhunters
2007		Kirsten Price (f); Manhunters	Austin Kincaid; Fade to Black 2
2007		Kirsten Price (f); Manhunters	Lexie Marie; Fade to Black 2
2007		Katsuni (v); Fashionistas Safado: The Challenge	
2007		Katsuni (v); Fashionistas Safado: The Challenge	Alana Evans; Corruption
2007		Katsuni (v); Fashionistas Safado: The Challenge	Nicki Hunter; Wild Things on the Run 3
2007		Katsuni (v); Fashionistas Safado: The Challenge	Kylie Ireland; Corruption
2007		Katsuni (v); Fashionistas Safado: The Challenge	Jassie; Sacred Sin
2007		Katsuni (v); Fashionistas Safado: The Challenge	Kat; Caliente
2007		Katsuni (v); Fashionistas Safado: The Challenge	Tory Lane; The Fling
2007		Katsuni (v); Fashionistas Safado: The Challenge	Kaylani Lei; Curse Eternal
2007		Katsuni (v); Fashionistas Safado: The Challenge	Carmen Luvana; Tailgunners
2007		Katsuni (v); Fashionistas Safado: The Challenge	Katie Morgan; Get Luckier!
2007		Katsuni (v); Fashionistas Safado: The Challenge	Stefani Morgan; Illicit
2007		Katsuni (v); Fashionistas Safado: The Challenge	Haley Paige; The New Neighbors
2007		Katsuni (v); Fashionistas Safado: The Challenge	Texas Presley; Orgazmika
2007		Katsuni (v); Fashionistas Safado: The Challenge	Keri Sable; The Visitors
2007		Katsuni (v); Fashionistas Safado: The Challenge	Aurora Snow; Rumour Had 'Em
2008		Kylie Ireland (f); Layout	Monique Alexander; Debbie Does Dallas ... Again
2008		Kylie Ireland (f); Layout	Penny Flame; The Fashion Underground
2008		Kylie Ireland (f); Layout	Joey; Layout
2008		Kylie Ireland (f); Layout	Cara Lott; Flasher
2008		Kylie Ireland (f); Layout	Hillary Scott; Debbie Does Dallas ... Again
2008		Hillary Scott (v); Upload	
2008		Hillary Scott (v); Upload	August; Supernatural
2008		Hillary Scott (v); Upload	Jessica Drake; Love Always
2008		Hillary Scott (v); Upload	Alana Evans; Not the Bradys XXX
2008		Hillary Scott (v); Upload	Penny Flame; Spunk'd the Movie
2008		Hillary Scott (v); Upload	India; Afrodite Superstar
2008		Hillary Scott (v); Upload	Kylie Ireland; Upload
2008		Hillary Scott (v); Upload	Veronica Jett; Nowhere Angels
2008		Hillary Scott (v); Upload	Katsuni; Fashionistas Safado: Berlin
2008		Hillary Scott (v); Upload	Kimberly Kane; Ave. X
2008		Hillary Scott (v); Upload	Sunny Lane; The Make Up
2008		Hillary Scott (v); Upload	Janine Lindemulder; Janine Loves Jenna
2008		Hillary Scott (v); Upload	Aurora Snow; Insertz
2008		Hillary Scott (v); Upload	Charlotte Stokely; Girls Lie
2008		Hillary Scott (v); Upload	Shyla Stylez; Coming Home
2009		Belladonna; Pirates II: Stagnetti's Revenge	Ashlynn Brooke; Hearts and Minds II: Modern Warfare
2009		Belladonna; Pirates II: Stagnetti's Revenge	Cassandra Cruz; Hearts and Minds II: Modern Warfare
2009		Belladonna; Pirates II: Stagnetti's Revenge	Claire Dames; Night of the Giving Head
2009		Belladonna; Pirates II: Stagnetti's Revenge	Stormy Daniels; The Wicked
2009		Belladonna; Pirates II: Stagnetti's Revenge	Kimberly Kane; Miles From Needles
2009		Belladonna; Pirates II: Stagnetti's Revenge	Katsuni; Pirates II: Stagnetti's Revenge
2009		Belladonna; Pirates II: Stagnetti's Revenge	Sunny Lane; Roller Dollz
2009		Belladonna; Pirates II: Stagnetti's Revenge	Ava Lauren; The Chauffeur's Daughter
2009		Belladonna; Pirates II: Stagnetti's Revenge	Shawna Leneé; This Ain't The Munsters XXX
2009		Belladonna; Pirates II: Stagnetti's Revenge	Marie Luv; Bad News Betties
2009		Belladonna; Pirates II: Stagnetti's Revenge	Katie Morgan; Fired
2009		Belladonna; Pirates II: Stagnetti's Revenge	Bree Olson; Carolina Jones & the Broken Covenant
2009		Belladonna; Pirates II: Stagnetti's Revenge	Teagan Presley; Not Bewitched XXX
2009		Belladonna; Pirates II: Stagnetti's Revenge	Stephanie Swift; Burn

=== 2010–2014 ===
Year	Photo	Winner Film	Nominees Films
2010		Penny Flame; Throat: A Cautionary Tale	Ashlynn Brooke; 30 Rock: A XXX Parody
2010		Penny Flame; Throat: A Cautionary Tale	Jada Fire; The Jeffersons: A XXX Parody
2010		Penny Flame; Throat: A Cautionary Tale	Sharon Kane; Jenna Confidential
2010		Penny Flame; Throat: A Cautionary Tale	Kagney Linn Karter; Not Married with Children XXX
2010		Penny Flame; Throat: A Cautionary Tale	Sunny Lane; Flight Attendants
2010		Penny Flame; Throat: A Cautionary Tale	Lindsey Meadows; The Price of Lust
2010		Penny Flame; Throat: A Cautionary Tale	Katie Morgan; The Love Box
2010		Penny Flame; Throat: A Cautionary Tale	Brittany O'Connell; Not Married with Children XXX
2010		Penny Flame; Throat: A Cautionary Tale	Kirsten Price; 2040
2010		Penny Flame; Throat: A Cautionary Tale	Amber Rayne; The 8th Day
2010		Penny Flame; Throat: A Cautionary Tale	Kristina Rose; Seinfeld: A XXX Parody
2010		Penny Flame; Throat: A Cautionary Tale	Hillary Scott; Fleshed Out
2010		Penny Flame; Throat: A Cautionary Tale	Misty Stone; Flight Attendants
2010		Penny Flame; Throat: A Cautionary Tale	Brynn Tyler; Not Three's Company XXX
2011		Lexi Belle; Batman XXX: A Porn Parody	Tori Black; Stripper Diaries
2011		Lexi Belle; Batman XXX: A Porn Parody	Tara Lynn Foxx; This Ain't Glee XXX
2011		Lexi Belle; Batman XXX: A Porn Parody	Sasha Grey; Real Wife Stories 6
2011		Lexi Belle; Batman XXX: A Porn Parody	Kylie Ireland; Scorned
2011		Lexi Belle; Batman XXX: A Porn Parody	Annabelle Lee; Cheers: A XXX Parody
2011		Lexi Belle; Batman XXX: A Porn Parody	Lorelei Lee; An Open Invitation: A Real Swinger's Party in San Francisco
2011		Lexi Belle; Batman XXX: A Porn Parody	Melissa Monet; River Rock Women’s Prison
2011		Lexi Belle; Batman XXX: A Porn Parody	Kirsten Price; Speed
2011		Lexi Belle; Batman XXX: A Porn Parody	Rayveness; Couples Camp
2011		Lexi Belle; Batman XXX: A Porn Parody	Kristina Rose; Seinfeld 2: A XXX Parody
2011		Lexi Belle; Batman XXX: A Porn Parody	Andy San Dimas; Malice in Lalaland
2011		Lexi Belle; Batman XXX: A Porn Parody	Misty Stone; Awakening to Love
2011		Lexi Belle; Batman XXX: A Porn Parody	India Summer; The Sex Files 2: A Dark XXX Parody
2011		Lexi Belle; Batman XXX: A Porn Parody	Sarah Vandella; Official Wife Swap Parody
2012		Jesse Jane; Fighters	Brooke Lee Adams; The Flintstones: A XXX Parody
2012		Jesse Jane; Fighters	Alektra Blue; The Rocki Whore Picture Show: A Hardcore Parody
2012		Jesse Jane; Fighters	Dana DeArmond; Beverly Hillbillies: A XXX Parody
2012		Jesse Jane; Fighters	Kimberly Kane; Horizon
2012		Jesse Jane; Fighters	Kagney Linn Karter; Beverly Hillbillies: A XXX Parody
2012		Jesse Jane; Fighters	Kayden Kross; Fighters
2012		Jesse Jane; Fighters	Lily LaBeau; Pervert
2012		Jesse Jane; Fighters	Brooklyn Lee; Spider-Man XXX: A Porn Parody
2012		Jesse Jane; Fighters	Chanel Preston; Rezervoir Doggs: An Exquisite Films Parody
2012		Jesse Jane; Fighters	Ann Marie Rios; Escaladies
2012		Jesse Jane; Fighters	Samantha Ryan; Pervert
2012		Jesse Jane; Fighters	Bobbi Starr; Scooby Doo: A XXX Parody
2012		Jesse Jane; Fighters	India Summer; Eternal
2012		Jesse Jane; Fighters	Sarah Vandella; Official Psycho Parody
2013		Capri Anderson; Pee-Wee’s XXX Adventure: A Porn Parody	Tori Black; Official The Hangover Parody
2013		Capri Anderson; Pee-Wee’s XXX Adventure: A Porn Parody	Dana DeArmond; Voilà
2013		Capri Anderson; Pee-Wee’s XXX Adventure: A Porn Parody	Gracie Glam; Spartacus MMXII: The Beginning
2013		Capri Anderson; Pee-Wee’s XXX Adventure: A Porn Parody	Kimberly Kane; Official The Hangover Parody
2013		Capri Anderson; Pee-Wee’s XXX Adventure: A Porn Parody	Kagney Linn Karter; Godfather: A Dreamzone Parody
2013		Capri Anderson; Pee-Wee’s XXX Adventure: A Porn Parody	Devon Lee; Spartacus MMXII: The Beginning
2013		Capri Anderson; Pee-Wee’s XXX Adventure: A Porn Parody	Lea Lexis; Voracious: The First Season
2013		Capri Anderson; Pee-Wee’s XXX Adventure: A Porn Parody	Chanel Preston; The Valley
2013		Capri Anderson; Pee-Wee’s XXX Adventure: A Porn Parody	Raylene; Torn
2013		Capri Anderson; Pee-Wee’s XXX Adventure: A Porn Parody	Andy San Dimas; Shared Wives
2013		Capri Anderson; Pee-Wee’s XXX Adventure: A Porn Parody	Celeste Star; Revenge of the Petites
2013		Capri Anderson; Pee-Wee’s XXX Adventure: A Porn Parody	Bobbi Starr; Dallas XXX: A Parody
2013		Capri Anderson; Pee-Wee’s XXX Adventure: A Porn Parody	Misty Stone; Men in Black: A Hardcore Parody
2013		Capri Anderson; Pee-Wee’s XXX Adventure: A Porn Parody	India Summer; Torn
2014		Brandy Aniston; Not The Wizard of Oz XXX	Bailey Blue; Change of Heart
2014		Brandy Aniston; Not The Wizard of Oz XXX	Alyssa Branch; Bridesmaids
2014		Brandy Aniston; Not The Wizard of Oz XXX	Dana DeArmond; Orgy University
2014		Brandy Aniston; Not The Wizard of Oz XXX	Alexis Ford; Just in Beaver Fever
2014		Brandy Aniston; Not The Wizard of Oz XXX	Zoey Holloway; Homecoming
2014		Brandy Aniston; Not The Wizard of Oz XXX	Chastity Lynn; Clerks XXX: A Porn Parody
2014		Brandy Aniston; Not The Wizard of Oz XXX	Odile; Daddy's Girls
2014		Brandy Aniston; Not The Wizard of Oz XXX	Chanel Preston; Laverne & Shirley XXX: A DreamZone Parody
2014		Brandy Aniston; Not The Wizard of Oz XXX	Jessa Rhodes; Bikini Outlaws
2014		Brandy Aniston; Not The Wizard of Oz XXX	Claire Robbins; What Do You Want Me to Say?
2014		Brandy Aniston; Not The Wizard of Oz XXX	Samantha Ryan; Man of Steel XXX: An Axel Braun Parody
2014		Brandy Aniston; Not The Wizard of Oz XXX	Stoya; Code of Honor
2014		Brandy Aniston; Not The Wizard of Oz XXX	Trinity St. Clair; Grease XXX
2014		Brandy Aniston; Not The Wizard of Oz XXX	Christie Stevens; OMG … It's the Dirty Dancing XXX Parody

=== 2015–2019 ===
Year	Photo	Winner Film	Nominees Films
2015		Veronica Avluv; Cinderella XXX: An Axel Braun Parody	Julia Ann; Thor XXX: An Axel Braun Parody
2015		Veronica Avluv; Cinderella XXX: An Axel Braun Parody	Carmen Caliente; Not Jersey Boys XXX: A Porn Musical
2015		Veronica Avluv; Cinderella XXX: An Axel Braun Parody	Stormy Daniels; Sleeping Beauty XXX: An Axel Braun Parody
2015		Veronica Avluv; Cinderella XXX: An Axel Braun Parody	Skin Diamond; The Doctor Whore Porn Parody
2015		Veronica Avluv; Cinderella XXX: An Axel Braun Parody	Alana Evans; E.T. XXX: A DreamZone Parody
2015		Veronica Avluv; Cinderella XXX: An Axel Braun Parody	Nina Hartley; Owner Gets Clipped
2015		Veronica Avluv; Cinderella XXX: An Axel Braun Parody	Kylie Ireland; The Pornographer
2015		Veronica Avluv; Cinderella XXX: An Axel Braun Parody	Aaliyah Love; American Hustle XXX Porn Parody
2015		Veronica Avluv; Cinderella XXX: An Axel Braun Parody	Belle Noire; The Long Hard Ride
2015		Veronica Avluv; Cinderella XXX: An Axel Braun Parody	Chanel Preston; Cape Fear XXX
2015		Veronica Avluv; Cinderella XXX: An Axel Braun Parody	Jessa Rhodes; Second Chances
2015		Veronica Avluv; Cinderella XXX: An Axel Braun Parody	Claire Robbins; 24 XXX: An Axel Braun Parody
2015		Veronica Avluv; Cinderella XXX: An Axel Braun Parody	Siri; Sweetness and Light
2015		Veronica Avluv; Cinderella XXX: An Axel Braun Parody	Aiden Starr; Pornocopia
2016		Kleio Valentien; Batman v Superman XXX: An Axel Braun Parody	Anikka Albrite; The Turning
2016		Kleio Valentien; Batman v Superman XXX: An Axel Braun Parody	Julia Ann; Stryker
2016		Kleio Valentien; Batman v Superman XXX: An Axel Braun Parody	Skin Diamond; Love, Sex & TV News
2016		Kleio Valentien; Batman v Superman XXX: An Axel Braun Parody	Jessica Drake; Starmaker
2016		Kleio Valentien; Batman v Superman XXX: An Axel Braun Parody	Allie Haze; Love, Lust & Longing
2016		Kleio Valentien; Batman v Superman XXX: An Axel Braun Parody	Karla Kush; My Girlfriend's Mother 8
2016		Kleio Valentien; Batman v Superman XXX: An Axel Braun Parody	Abigail Mac; Flesh
2016		Kleio Valentien; Batman v Superman XXX: An Axel Braun Parody	Chanel Preston; This Ain't The Interview XXX
2016		Kleio Valentien; Batman v Superman XXX: An Axel Braun Parody	Amber Rayne; Wanted
2016		Kleio Valentien; Batman v Superman XXX: An Axel Braun Parody	Jessa Rhodes; Sisters of Anarchy
2016		Kleio Valentien; Batman v Superman XXX: An Axel Braun Parody	Celeste Star; Saving Humanity
2016		Kleio Valentien; Batman v Superman XXX: An Axel Braun Parody	Misty Stone; Magic Mike XXXL: A Hardcore Parody
2016		Kleio Valentien; Batman v Superman XXX: An Axel Braun Parody	Stoya; Screwing Wall Street: The Arrangement Finders IPO
2016		Kleio Valentien; Batman v Superman XXX: An Axel Braun Parody	Kasey Warner; Mother's Little Helper
2017		Joanna Angel; Cindy Queen of Hell	Britney Amber; The Donald
2017		Joanna Angel; Cindy Queen of Hell	Julia Ann; Keep It in the Family
2017		Joanna Angel; Cindy Queen of Hell	Mercedes Carrera; Project Pandora: A Psychosexual Lesbian Thriller
2017		Joanna Angel; Cindy Queen of Hell	Adriana Chechik; Color Blind
2017		Joanna Angel; Cindy Queen of Hell	Bree Daniels; Lefty
2017		Joanna Angel; Cindy Queen of Hell	Alexis Fawx; The Preacher’s Daughter
2017		Joanna Angel; Cindy Queen of Hell	Holly Heart; The Young & the Rest of Us
2017		Joanna Angel; Cindy Queen of Hell	Kendra James; Missing: A Lesbian Crime Story
2017		Joanna Angel; Cindy Queen of Hell	Karla Kush; Forbidden Affairs 5: My Wife’s Daughter
2017		Joanna Angel; Cindy Queen of Hell	Angel Long; Hard in Love
2017		Joanna Angel; Cindy Queen of Hell	Aaliyah Love; New Beginnings
2017		Joanna Angel; Cindy Queen of Hell	Katie Morgan; Republican Candidate Wife Swap
2017		Joanna Angel; Cindy Queen of Hell	April O'Neil; Ten Inch Mutant Ninja Turtles and Other Porn Parodies
2017		Joanna Angel; Cindy Queen of Hell	Jessa Rhodes; Good Little Girl
2017		Joanna Angel; Cindy Queen of Hell	Kasey Warner; Color Blind
2018		Kristen Scott; Half His Age: A Teenage Tragedy	Joanna Angel; My Killer Girlfriend
2018		Kristen Scott; Half His Age: A Teenage Tragedy	A.J. Applegate; Adventures With the Baumgartners
2018		Kristen Scott; Half His Age: A Teenage Tragedy	Kat Dior; Extradition
2018		Kristen Scott; Half His Age: A Teenage Tragedy	Karlee Grey; Ingenue
2018		Kristen Scott; Half His Age: A Teenage Tragedy	Nina Hartley; Confessions of a Sinful Nun
2018		Kristen Scott; Half His Age: A Teenage Tragedy	Elsa Jean; Nerds
2018		Kristen Scott; Half His Age: A Teenage Tragedy	Aaliyah Love; Inner Demons
2018		Kristen Scott; Half His Age: A Teenage Tragedy	Kira Noir; Ethni•City
2018		Kristen Scott; Half His Age: A Teenage Tragedy	Brett Rossi; Fantasy Factory
2018		Kristen Scott; Half His Age: A Teenage Tragedy	Chanel Preston; The Obsession
2018		Kristen Scott; Half His Age: A Teenage Tragedy	Layla Sin; Love for Sale 2
2018		Kristen Scott; Half His Age: A Teenage Tragedy	Luna Star; Bad Babes Inc.
2018		Kristen Scott; Half His Age: A Teenage Tragedy	Violet Starr; The Submission of Emma Marx: Evolved
2018		Kristen Scott; Half His Age: A Teenage Tragedy	Charlotte Stokely; Justice League XXX: An Axel Braun Parody
2019		Joanna Angel; A Trailer Park Taboo	Kat Dior; The Cursed XXX
2019		Joanna Angel; A Trailer Park Taboo	Kenna James; The Puppeteer
2019		Joanna Angel; A Trailer Park Taboo	Elsa Jean; Talk Derby to Me
2019		Joanna Angel; A Trailer Park Taboo	JoJo Kiss; Flawless
2019		Joanna Angel; A Trailer Park Taboo	Lily LaBeau; Star Wars: The Last Temptation – A Digital Playground XXX Parody
2019		Joanna Angel; A Trailer Park Taboo	Ivy Lebelle; I Know Who You Fucked Last Halloween
2019		Joanna Angel; A Trailer Park Taboo	April O’Neil; Fantasy Factory: Wastelands
2019		Joanna Angel; A Trailer Park Taboo	Penny Pax; Lady Boss
2019		Joanna Angel; A Trailer Park Taboo	Romi Rain; The Seduction of Heidi
2019		Joanna Angel; A Trailer Park Taboo	Alison Rey; The Call Girl
2019		Joanna Angel; A Trailer Park Taboo	Charlotte Stokely; Becoming Elsa: A Coming of Age Story
2019		Joanna Angel; A Trailer Park Taboo	Misty Stone; Cartel Sex
2019		Joanna Angel; A Trailer Park Taboo	Stoya; Talk Derby to Me
2019		Joanna Angel; A Trailer Park Taboo	Sarah Vandella; Anne: A Taboo Parody

=== 2020–present ===
Year	Photo	Winner Film	Nominees Films
2020		Maitland Ward; Drive	Joanna Angel; Love Song
2020		Maitland Ward; Drive	Nina Hartley; Confessions of a Sinful Nun 2: The Rise of Sister Mona
2020		Maitland Ward; Drive	Ella Hughes; Uninvited
2020		Maitland Ward; Drive	Kenna James; Teenage Lesbian
2020		Maitland Ward; Drive	Avi Love; A Daughter’s Deception
2020		Maitland Ward; Drive	Kira Noir; The Gentleman
2020		Maitland Ward; Drive	Penny Pax; Lost Love
2020		Maitland Ward; Drive	Mona Wales; The Girls Next Door
2020		Maitland Ward; Drive	Jane Wilde; Better Things to Do
2021		Kira Noir; Primary	Joanna Angel; The Path to Forgiveness
2021		Kira Noir; Primary	Vanna Bardot; A Killer on the Loose
2021		Kira Noir; Primary	Adriana Chechik; Muse
2021		Kira Noir; Primary	Kenna James; Pushing Boundaries
2021		Kira Noir; Primary	Avi Love; The Ex-Girlfriend Debacle
2021		Kira Noir; Primary	Penny Pax; Primary
2021		Kira Noir; Primary	Demi Sutra; Prison Heat
2021		Kira Noir; Primary	Daisy Taylor; The Path to Forgiveness
2021		Kira Noir; Primary	Whitney Wright; The Producer II
2022		Kira Noir; Casey: A True Story	Brooklyn Gray; Blue Moon Rising
2022		Kira Noir; Casey: A True Story	Ryan Keely; Matriarch
2022		Kira Noir; Casey: A True Story	Helena Locke; Under the Veil
2022		Kira Noir; Casey: A True Story	Misha Montana; Ink Motel 3
2022		Kira Noir; Casey: A True Story	Jessa Rhodes; Kill Code 87
2022		Kira Noir; Casey: A True Story	Scarlett Sage; Written in the Stars
2022		Kira Noir; Casey: A True Story	Charlotte Stokely; Under the Veil
2022		Kira Noir; Casey: A True Story	Misty Stone; Sweet Sweet Sally Mae
2022		Kira Noir; Casey: A True Story	Victoria Voxxx; Primary Season 2
2023		Kira Noir; Sorrow Bay	Vanna Bardot; Love, Sex & Music
2023		Kira Noir; Sorrow Bay	Lilly Bell; Going Up, Lust Cinema
2023		Kira Noir; Sorrow Bay	Skye Blue; A Taste of Kunst
2023		Kira Noir; Sorrow Bay	Anna Claire Clouds; Hysteria
2023		Kira Noir; Sorrow Bay	Ana Foxxx; Torn
2023		Kira Noir; Sorrow Bay	Brooklyn Gray; Sorrow Bay
2023		Kira Noir; Sorrow Bay	Charlotte Sins; Grinders
2023		Kira Noir; Sorrow Bay	Jennifer White; Deranged (Vols. 1 & 2)
2023		Kira Noir; Sorrow Bay	Maya Woulfe; Going Up
2024		Victoria Voxxx; Primary 3	Aiden Ashely; Redemption
2024		Victoria Voxxx; Primary 3	Cali Caliente; Sally Mae: The Revenge of the Twin Dragons
2024		Victoria Voxxx; Primary 3	Charlie Forde; Behind the Scenes
2024		Victoria Voxxx; Primary 3	Laney Grey; Redemption
2024		Victoria Voxxx; Primary 3	Andi James; The Wedding
2024		Victoria Voxxx; Primary 3	Geisha Kyd; Space Junk
2024		Victoria Voxxx; Primary 3	Ryan Reid; Reckless
2024		Victoria Voxxx; Primary 3	August Skye; Reckless
2024		Victoria Voxxx; Primary 3	Jane Wilde; Trouble
2025		Chanel Camryn; Sunny Goldmelons	Monique Alexander; Project X
2025		Chanel Camryn; Sunny Goldmelons	Vicki Chase; Gold Diggers
2025		Chanel Camryn; Sunny Goldmelons	Kimmy Granger; Gold Diggers
2025		Chanel Camryn; Sunny Goldmelons	Selena Ivy; Last Splash
2025		Chanel Camryn; Sunny Goldmelons	Sophia Locke; Alive
2025		Chanel Camryn; Sunny Goldmelons	Leana Lovings; Birth
2025		Chanel Camryn; Sunny Goldmelons	Freya Parker; Spun
2025		Chanel Camryn; Sunny Goldmelons	Shay Sights; Let Me In
2025		Chanel Camryn; Sunny Goldmelons	Jennifer White; Dirty Cops
2026		Chloe Surreal; Mind Games	

== See also ==
- AVN Award for Best Supporting Actor
