= AVN Award for Female Performer of the Year =

Adult entertainment industry award

- Awarded for: Female Performer of the Year
- Country: United States
- Presented by: AVN Media Network
- First award: 1993; 33 years ago
- Currently held by: Jennifer White
- Website: avn.com/awards

The AVN Award for Female Performer of the Year is presented every January in Las Vegas, Nevada at the AVN Awards ceremony sponsored and presented by the American adult video industry trade magazine Adult Video News (AVN). It represents the female porn star who has had the best body of work in the previous year. It has been given annually since 1993.

Tori Black was the first two-time winner, winning back-to-back in 2010 and 2011. Angela White was the first three-time winner, winning back-to-back-to-back in 2018, 2019 and 2020. Kira Noir became the first black woman to win the award in 2023.

== Winners and nominees ==
=== 1990s ===
| Year | Photo | Winner | Nominees |
|---|---|---|---|
| 1993 | | Ashlyn Gere | |
| 1994 | | Debi Diamond | Rebecca Bardoux; Celeste; Ashlyn Gere; Shayla LaVeaux; Leena; Tiffany Mynx; P. J. Sparxx; Crystal Wilder; Ona Zee |
| 1995 | | Asia Carrera | Tammi Ann; Ariana; Kaitlyn Ashley; Misty Rain; Shane; Ashlyn Gere; Sarah Jane Hamilton; Kylie Ireland; Leena; Tyffany Million; Brittany O'Connell |
| 1996 | | Kaitlyn Ashley | Tammi Ann; Juli Ashton; Celeste; Careena Collins; Jeanna Fine; Tera Heart; Melissa Hill; Jenna Jameson; Lana Sands; Nici Sterling |
| 1997 | | Missy | Juli Ashton; Alex Dane; Jeanna Fine; Melissa Hill; Jenna Jameson; Jill Kelly; Christi Lake; Shayla LaVeaux; Caressa Savage; Nici Sterling; Nikki Tyler |
| 1998 | | Stephanie Swift | Chloe; Jill Kelly; Christi Lake; Dyanna Lauren; Shanna McCullough; Mila; Missy; Tiffany Mynx; Julie Rage; Jasmin St. Claire; Serenity; Stacy Valentine |
| 1999 | | Chloe | Johnni Black; Asia Carrera; Roxanne Hall; Alisha Klass; Jill Kelly; Midori; Mocha; Tiffany Mynx; Silvia Saint; Serenity; Stacy Valentine |

=== 2000s ===
| Year | Photo | Winner | Nominees |
|---|---|---|---|
| 2000 | | Inari Vachs | Chloe; Sabrina Johnson; Alisha Klass; Monique; Raylene; Serenity; Alexandra Silk; Stephanie Swift |
| 2001 | | Jewel De'Nyle | Jessica Darlin; Dee; Bridgette Kerkove; Shelbee Myne; Kristi Myst; Alexandra Quinn; Serenity; Sydnee Steele; Inari Vachs; Ava Vincent |
| 2002 | | Nikita Denise | Chloe; Jewel De'Nyle; Bridgette Kerkove; Monique; Taylor St. Claire; Serenity; Sydnee Steele; Ava Vincent |
| 2003 | | Aurora Snow | April Flowers; Briana Banks; Belladonna; Calli Cox; Nikita Denise; Jewel De'Nyle; Jessica Drake; Devinn Lane; Jodie Moore; Obsession; Michele Raven; Olivia Saint; Nicole Sheridan; Taylor St. Claire; Sydnee Steele |
| 2004 | | Ashley Blue | Sunrise Adams; Belladonna; Jessica Darlin; Olivia Del Rio; Jewel De'Nyle; Bridgette Kerkove; Devinn Lane; Ashley Long; Carmen Luvana; Gina Lynn; Monique; Taylor Rain; Savanna Samson; Aurora Snow |
| 2005 | | Lauren Phoenix | Ashley Blue; Cindy Crawford; Cytherea; Jessica Drake; Ariana Jollee; Katja Kassin; Katrina Kraven; Gina Lynn; Julie Night; Jayna Oso; Taylor Rain; Alicia Rhodes; Savanna Samson; Venus |
| 2006 | | Audrey Hollander | Jada Fire; Nicki Hunter; Roxy Jezel; Ariana Jollee; Dillan Lauren; Melissa Lauren; Missy Monroe; Gia Paloma; Lauren Phoenix; Taylor Rain; Sandra Romain; Brittney Skye; Flower Tucci; Venus |
| 2007 | | Hillary Scott | Belladonna; Jasmine Byrne; Jada Fire; Jenna Haze; Roxy Jezel; Kimberly Kane; Kinzie Kenner; Sunny Lane; Tory Lane; Shy Love; Marie Luv; Sandra Romain; Sativa Rose; Flower Tucci |
| 2008 | | Sasha Grey | Monique Alexander; Courtney Cummz; Stormy Daniels; Jada Fire; Jenna Haze; Jesse Jane; Sunny Lane; Rebeca Linares; Brianna Love; Kirsten Price; Amy Ried; Savanna Samson; Annette Schwarz; Hillary Scott |
| 2009 | | Jenna Haze | Belladonna; Ashlynn Brooke; Roxy DeVille; Jessica Drake; Sasha Grey; Jenny Hendrix; Jesse Jane; Kayden Kross; Sunny Lane; Sunny Leone; Rebeca Linares; Marie Luv; Gianna Michaels; Bobbi Starr; Alexis Texas |

=== 2010s ===
| Year | Photo | Winner | Nominees |
|---|---|---|---|
| 2010 | | Tori Black | Belladonna; Lexi Belle; Ashlynn Brooke; Dana DeArmond; Chayse Evans; Jenna Haze; Kayden Kross; Jesse Jane; Amber Rayne; Nikki Rhodes; Ann Marie Rios; Kristina Rose; Bobbi Starr; Misty Stone |
| 2011 | | Tori Black | Asa Akira; Monique Alexander; Lexi Belle; Jenna Haze; Kagney Linn Karter; Kimberly Kane; Kayden Kross; Faye Reagan; Kristina Rose; Andy San Dimas; Bobbi Starr; Riley Steele; Misty Stone; Alexis Texas |
| 2012 | | Bobbi Starr | Asa Akira; Lexi Belle; Dana DeArmond; Gracie Glam; Allie Haze; Jesse Jane; Kagney Linn Karter; Kimberly Kane; Kayden Kross; Lily LaBeau; Phoenix Marie; Chanel Preston; Kristina Rose; Andy San Dimas; Alexis Texas |
| 2013 | | Asa Akira | Jessie Andrews; Eva Angelina; Lexi Belle; Lily Carter; Dana DeArmond; Skin Diamond; Gracie Glam; Allie Haze; Kayden Kross; Lily LaBeau; Brooklyn Lee; Chanel Preston; Kristina Rose; Samantha Saint; Andy San Dimas; Bobbi Starr; Jada Stevens; Misty Stone; Alexis Texas |
| 2014 | | Bonnie Rotten | Asa Akira; Anikka Albrite; Bailey Blue; Dani Daniels; Dana DeArmond; Skin Diamond; Allie Haze; Remy LaCroix; Maddy O'Reilly; Chanel Preston; Riley Reid; Samantha Saint; Sheena Shaw; Jada Stevens |
| 2015 | | Anikka Albrite | A.J. Applegate; Adriana Chechik; Dani Daniels; Skin Diamond; Veruca James; Zoey Monroe; Maddy O'Reilly; Chanel Preston; Romi Rain; Riley Reid; Bonnie Rotten; Dahlia Sky; Jada Stevens; Jodi Taylor |
| 2016 | | Riley Reid | Anikka Albrite; August Ames; A.J. Applegate; Vicki Chase; Adriana Chechik; Carter Cruise; Dani Daniels; Aidra Fox; Keisha Grey; Jillian Janson; Eva Lovia; Maddy O'Reilly; Romi Rain; Kleio Valentien |
| 2017 | | Adriana Chechik | Anikka Albrite; August Ames; A.J. Applegate; Vicki Chase; Abella Danger; Aidra Fox; Keisha Grey; Chanell Heart; Katrina Jade; Jillian Janson; Sara Luvv; Megan Rain; Riley Reid; Veronica Rodriguez |
| 2018 | | Angela White | August Ames; Adriana Chechik; Abella Danger; Aidra Fox; Keisha Grey; Holly Hendrix; Katrina Jade; Elsa Jean; Eva Lovia; Riley Reid; Lana Rhoades; Jessa Rhodes; Natalia Starr; Gina Valentina |
| 2019 | | Angela White | Adriana Chechik; Abella Danger; Honey Gold; Katrina Jade; Elsa Jean; Jill Kassidy; Abigail Mac; Ariana Marie; Kira Noir; Riley Reid; Kristen Scott; Kissa Sins; Gina Valentina; Whitney Wright |

=== 2020s ===
| Year | Photo | Winner | Nominees |
|---|---|---|---|
| 2020 | | Angela White | Adriana Chechik; Abella Danger; Joanna Angel; Ana Foxxx; Alina Lopez; Abigail Mac; Kira Noir; Kenzie Reeves; Riley Reid; Karma Rx; Kristen Scott; Jane Wilde; Emily Willis; Whitney Wright |
| 2021 | | Emily Willis | Adriana Chechik; Abella Danger; Gia Derza; Gianna Dior; Ana Foxxx; Emma Hix; Kenna James; Alina Lopez; Kira Noir; Kyler Quinn; Kenzie Reeves; Naomi Swann; Angela White; Jane Wilde |
| 2022 | | Gianna Dior | Aiden Ashley; Vanna Bardot; Lulu Chu; Avery Cristy; Gia Derza; Emma Hix; Kenna James; Kira Noir; Kenzie Reeves; Scarlit Scandal; Alexis Tae; Angela White; Jane Wilde; Emily Willis |
| 2023 | | Kira Noir | Aiden Ashley; Vanna Bardot; Lilly Bell; Blake Blossom; Savannah Bond; Anna Claire Clouds; Gianna Dior; Ana Foxxx; Kenna James; Maddy May; April Olsen; Alexis Tae; Angela White; Jane Wilde |
| 2024 | | Vanna Bardot | Lilly Bell; Blake Blossom; Lulu Chu; Anna Claire Clouds; Nicole Doshi; Ana Foxxx; Liz Jordan; Maddy May; Kira Noir; Kylie Rocket; Alexis Tae; Angela White; Jennifer White; Angel Youngs |
| 2025 | | Anna Claire Clouds | Vanna Bardot; Lilly Bell; Blake Blossom; Jewelz Blu; Chanel Camryn; Nicole Doshi; Liz Jordan; Cherry Kiss; Kira Noir; Octavia Red; Willow Ryder; Angela White; Jennifer White; Angel Youngs |
| 2026 | | Jennifer White | Chloe Amour; Vanna Bardot; Lilly Bell; Blake Blossom; Chanel Camryn; Anna Claire Clouds; Liz Jordan; Cherry Kiss; Nicole Kitt; Rissa May; Octavia Red; Gal Ritchie; Kylie Rocket; Angela White |
| 2027 | | | Lilly Bell; Blake Blossom; Anna Claire Clouds; Elly Clutch; Hazel Heart; Cheerleader Kait; Cherry Kiss; Nicole Kitt; Rissa May; Octavia Red; Gal Ritchie; Emma Rosie; Charlotte Sins; Angela White; Jennifer White |

== Multiple wins and nominations ==
=== Multiple wins ===
| Wins | Performer | Years |
|---|---|---|
| 3 | Angela White | 2018, 2019, 2020 |
| 2 | Tori Black | 2010, 2011 |

=== Three or more nominations ===
| Nominations | Performer | Years |
|---|---|---|
| 10 | Angela White | 2018, 2019, 2020, 2021, 2022, 2023, 2024, 2025, 2026, 2027 |
| 7 | Riley Reid | 2014, 2015, 2016, 2017, 2018, 2019, 2020 |
| 7 | Adriana Chechik | 2015, 2016, 2017, 2018, 2019, 2020, 2021 |
| 7 | Kira Noir | 2019, 2020, 2021, 2022, 2023, 2024, 2025 |
| 5 | Serenity | 1998, 1999, 2000, 2001, 2002 |
| 5 | Belladonna | 2003, 2004, 2007, 2009, 2010 |
| 5 | Jenna Haze | 2007, 2008, 2009, 2010, 2011 |
| 5 | Bobbi Starr | 2009, 2010, 2011, 2012, 2013 |
| 5 | Kayden Kross | 2009, 2010, 2011, 2012, 2013 |
| 5 | Abella Danger | 2017, 2018, 2019, 2020, 2021 |
| 5 | Vanna Bardot | 2022, 2023, 2024, 2025, 2026 |
| 5 | Anna Claire Clouds | 2023, 2024, 2025, 2026, 2027 |
| 5 | Lilly Bell | 2023, 2024, 2025, 2026, 2027 |
| 5 | Blake Blossom | 2023, 2024, 2025, 2026, 2027 |
| 4 | Chloe | 1998, 1999, 2000, 2002 |
| 4 | Jewel De'Nyle | 2001, 2002, 2003, 2004 |
| 4 | Jesse Jane | 2008, 2009, 2010, 2012 |
| 4 | Alexis Texas | 2009, 2011, 2012, 2013 |
| 4 | Lexi Belle | 2010, 2011, 2012, 2013 |
| 4 | Kristina Rose | 2010, 2011, 2012, 2013 |
| 4 | Dana DeArmond | 2010, 2012, 2013, 2014 |
| 4 | Asa Akira | 2011, 2012, 2013, 2014 |
| 4 | Chanel Preston | 2012, 2013, 2014, 2015 |
| 4 | Anikka Albrite | 2014, 2015, 2016, 2017 |
| 4 | Jane Wilde | 2020, 2021, 2022, 2023 |
| 4 | Ana Foxxx | 2020, 2021, 2023, 2024 |
| 4 | Jennifer White | 2024, 2025, 2026, 2027 |
| 3 | Ashlyn Gere | 1993, 1994, 1995 |
| 3 | Tiffany Mynx | 1994, 1998, 1999 |
| 3 | Jill Kelly | 1997, 1998, 1999 |
| 3 | Sydnee Steele | 2001, 2002, 2003 |
| 3 | Monique | 2000, 2002, 2004 |
| 3 | Bridgette Kerkove | 2001, 2002, 2004 |
| 3 | Taylor Rain | 2004, 2005, 2006 |
| 3 | Savanna Samson | 2004, 2005, 2008 |
| 3 | Jada Fire | 2006, 2007, 2008 |
| 3 | Jessica Drake | 2003, 2005, 2009 |
| 3 | Sunny Lane | 2007, 2008, 2009 |
| 3 | Kimberly Kane | 2007, 2011, 2012 |
| 3 | Misty Stone | 2010, 2011, 2013 |
| 3 | Andy San Dimas | 2011, 2012, 2013 |
| 3 | Allie Haze | 2012, 2013, 2014 |
| 3 | Skin Diamond | 2013, 2014, 2015 |
| 3 | Jada Stevens | 2013, 2014, 2015 |
| 3 | Dani Daniels | 2014, 2015, 2016 |
| 3 | Maddy O'Reilly | 2014, 2015, 2016 |
| 3 | A.J. Applegate | 2015, 2016, 2017 |
| 3 | August Ames | 2016, 2017, 2018 |
| 3 | Aidra Fox | 2016, 2017, 2018 |
| 3 | Keisha Grey | 2016, 2017, 2018 |
| 3 | Katrina Jade | 2017, 2018, 2019 |
| 3 | Emily Willis | 2020, 2021, 2022 |
| 3 | Kenzie Reeves | 2020, 2021, 2022 |
| 3 | Gianna Dior | 2021, 2022, 2023 |
| 3 | Kenna James | 2021, 2022, 2023 |
| 3 | Alexis Tae | 2022, 2023, 2024 |
| 3 | Liz Jordan | 2024, 2025, 2026 |
| 3 | Cherry Kiss | 2025, 2026, 2027 |
| 3 | Octavia Red | 2025, 2026, 2027 |

== See also ==
- AVN Award for Best Actress
- AVN Award for Best Supporting Actress
- AVN Award for Female Foreign Performer of the Year
- AVN Award for Transsexual Performer of the Year
- AVN Award for Male Performer of the Year
- AVN Award for Male Foreign Performer of the Year
- AVN Award for Best Actor
- AVN Award for Best Supporting Actor
