= 38th AVN Awards =

US pornography award ceremony in 2021

- Date: January 23, 2021
- Location: Held virtually due to the COVID-19 pandemic
- Presented by: MyFreeCams.com
- Hosted by: Kira Noir and Skyler Lo

Highlights
- Best Film: Muse
- Best Actress: Angela White
- Best Actor: Tommy Pistol
- Most wins: Angela White (6)
- Most nominations: Angela White (10)

38th AVN Awards

The 38th AVN Awards officially the 38th AVN Awards presented by MyFreeCams.com was a pornography awards ceremony held on January 23, 2021. The 38th edition of the ceremony which began in 1984 encompassed 120 categories involving content creation, production, retail and web/tech forums in the adult industry. Due to the ongoing global COVID-19 pandemic the ceremony was held virtually and streamed on Adult Video News' AVNStars.com.

== Show overview ==
=== Production ===
In July 2020 it was announced the award ceremony and related events typically held in Las Vegas would instead be held virtually due to the ongoing pandemic. “The health and safety of our attendees and exhibitors is our top priority, so out of an abundance of caution we’ve made the difficult decision to not hold our January events in-person, but instead create a digital experience that will give industry professionals and the fans of adult entertainment unique opportunities to interact online,” said Tony Rios, chief executive officer of AVN Media Network. The award ceremony was held January 23, the AVN Adult Entertainment Expo was also held on the AVN Stars platform the leading up to the ceremony, as well as the GayVN Awards held on January 18 exclusively on the GayVN Stars website.

=== Hosts ===
On January 8, 2021, adult performers Kira Noir and Skyler Lo were announced as co-hosts for the show.

== Winners and nominees ==
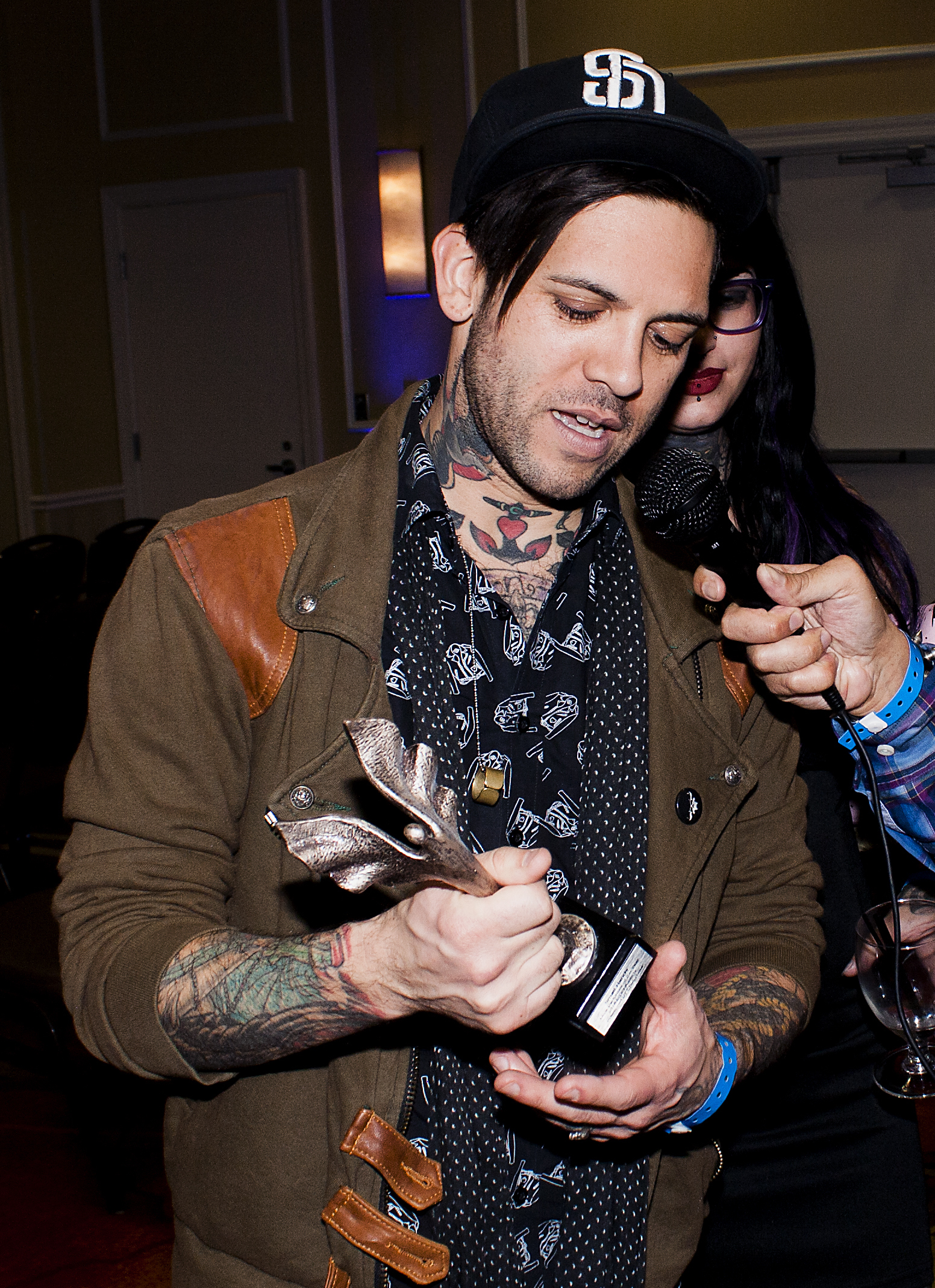
Small hands winner of Male Performer of the Year.

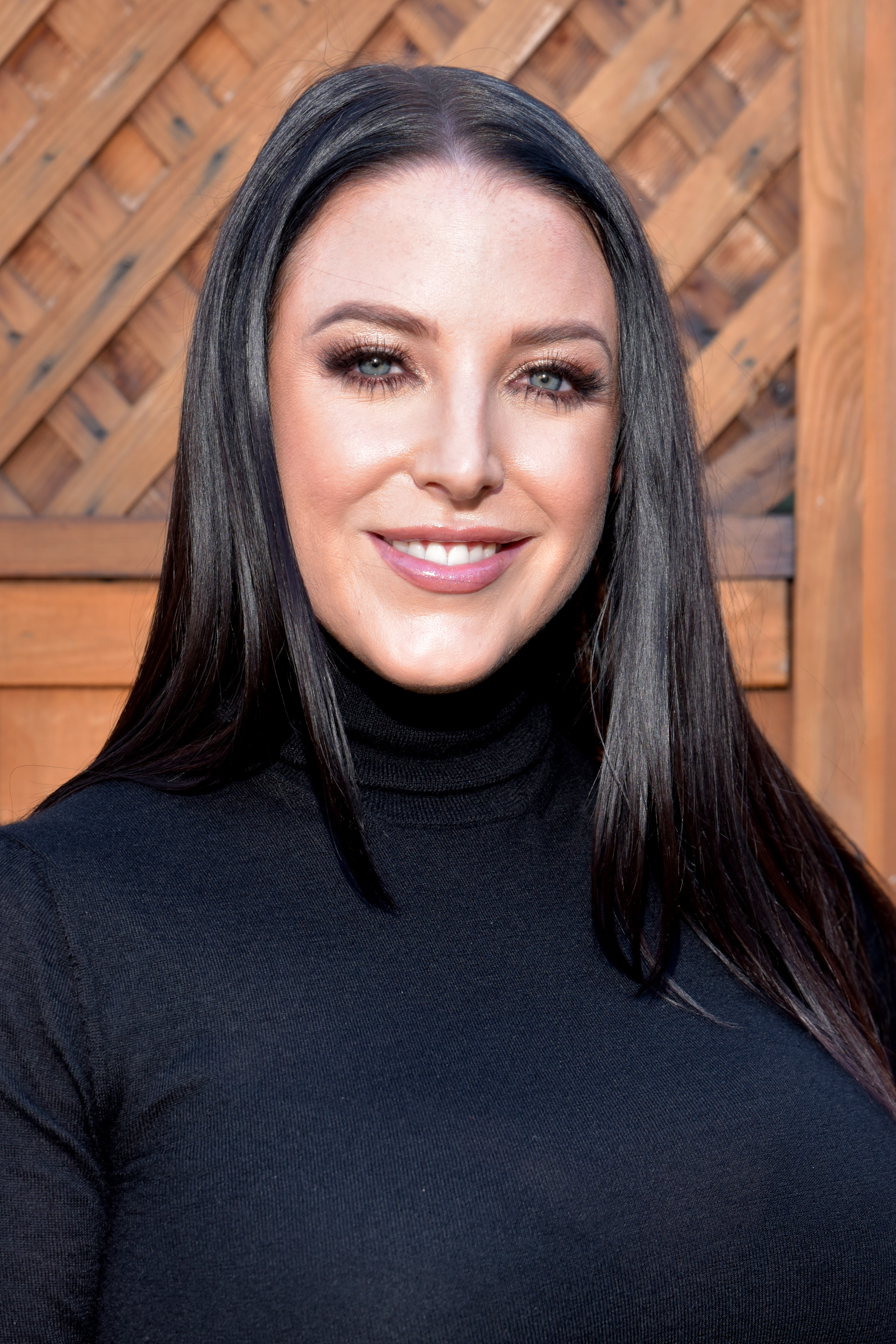
Angela White won Best Actress in addition to wins for Best Group Sex Scene, Best Non-Sex Performance, Favorite Female Porn Star, Most Spectacular Boobs and Social Media Star.

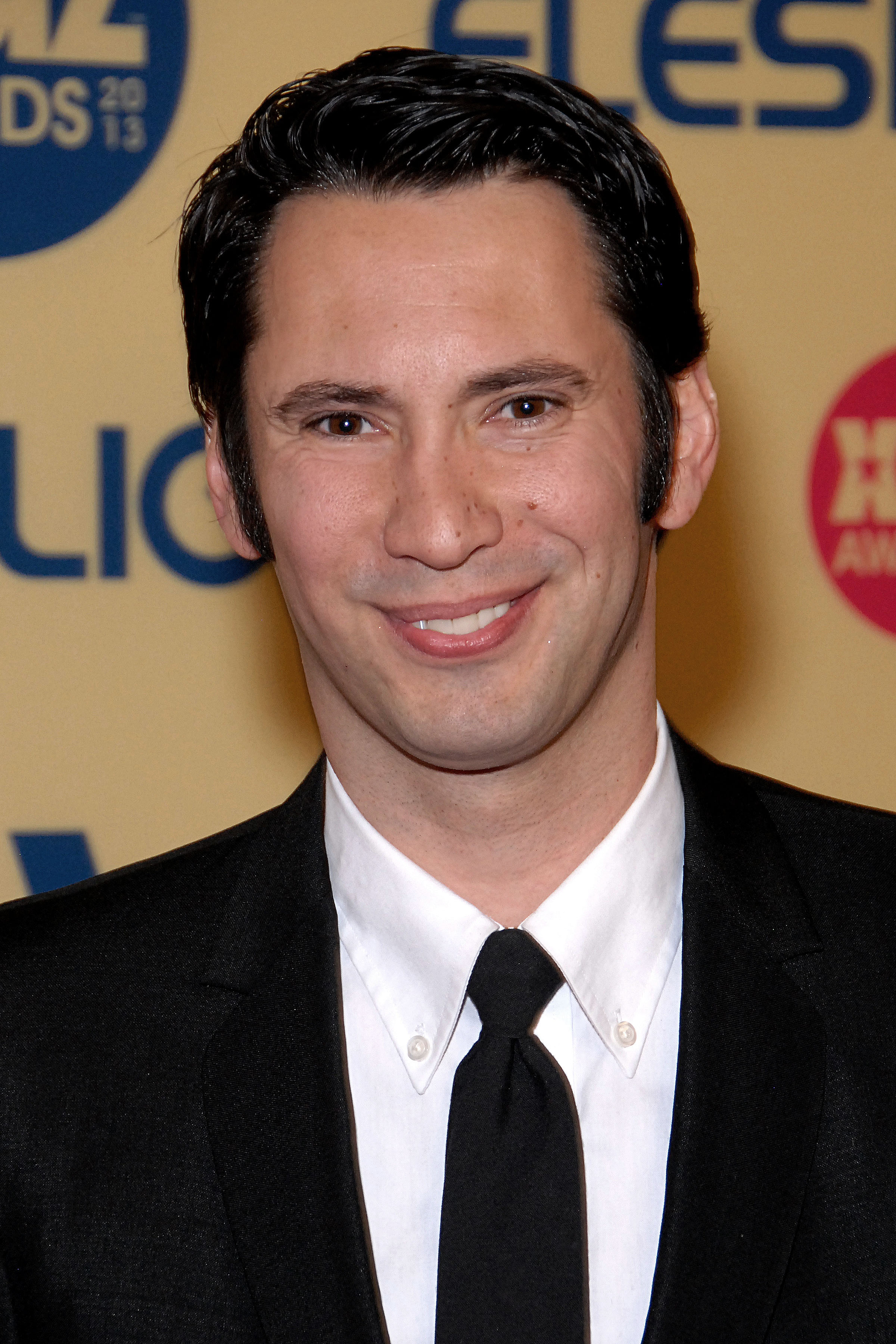
Tommy Pistol winner of Best Actor – Featurette.

=== Major awards ===
Winners in bold.

Ref(s)
Female Performer of the Year	Male Performer of the Year
Adriana Chechik; Abella Danger; Gia Derza; Gianna Dior; Ana Foxxx; Emma Hix; Kenna James; Alina Lopez; Kira Noir; Kyler Quinn; Kenzie Reeves; Naomi Swann; Angela White; Jane Wilde; **Emily Willis**	Mick Blue; Xander Corvus; Charles Dera; Damon Dice; Markus Dupree; Manuel Ferrara; Seth Gamble; **Small Hands**; Ricky Johnson; Keiran Lee; Isiah Maxwell; Ramón Nomar; Tommy Pistol; Jax Slayher; Prince Yahshua
Best Actress	Best Actor
Evelyn Claire, Romantic Charades, AllHerLuv; Lotus Lain, Chemistry Eases the Pain, Pink and White Productions; Alina Lopez, Fertile (f. Under the Bed Vol. 2), Pure Taboo/Pulse; Avi Love, Another Life 2, AllHerLuv; Kenzie Reeves, A Beautiful Mistake, MissaX; Kendra Spade, What Set Us Apart (f. True Lesbian), Adult Time/Pulse; Khloe Kapri, Krazy Khloe (f. Social Experiment), PornFidelity/Kelly Madison/Juicy; Demi Sutra, Afrodisiac: A Demi Sutra Story, Pure Taboo/AdultTime.com; **Angela White, Seasons, AllHerLuv**; Emily Willis, Nymphomania: An Emily Willis Story, Pure Taboo/AdultTime.com	Dick Chibbles, The Real Me, Pure Taboo/Pulse; Stirling Cooper, The Specialist, MissaX; Charles Dera, Nice Girls Finish Last (f. Cutting the Cord: A Jane Wilde Story), Pure Taboo/Pulse; Johnny Goodluck, No One Was Supposed to Be Here, Pure Taboo/AdultTime.com; Steve Holmes, Afrodisiac: A Demi Sutra Story, Pure Taboo/AdultTime.com; Alex Jones, No More Mr. Nice Guy (f. It's Complicated), Bellesa/Mile High; Tyler Nixon, A Beautiful Mistake, MissaX; Logan Pierce, Chemistry Eases the Pain, Pink and White Productions; **Tommy Pistol, Another Life, MissaX**; Michael Vegas, Three's a Crowd?, MissaX
Best Leading Actress	Best Leading Actor
Aiden Ashley, A Killer on the Loose, Missa X/Pulse; Cherie DeVille, 40 Years Old, Comes to Life, Dorcel/Wicked; Ana Foxxx, Primary, Lust Cinema; Kimmy Granger, Vacation in Purgatory, Digital Playground/Pulse; Madison Ivy, No Mercy for Mankind, Digital Playground/Pulse; Lacy Lennon, Alien Rhapsody, Girlfriends Films; Cadence Lux, The Producer II, AllHerLuv; Naomi Swann, My Sinful Valentine, Sweet Sinner/Mile High; Mona Wales, Pushing Boundaries, MissaX; **Maitland Ward, Muse, Deeper**	Nathan Bronson, My Sinful Valentine, Sweet Sinner/Mile High; Danny D., No Mercy for Mankind, Digital Playground/Pulse; **Seth Gamble, A Killer on the Loose, MissaX/Pulse**; Quinton James, The Seductress, Sweet Sinner/Mile High; Ryan Mclane, Pushing Boundaries, MissaX; Tyler Nixon, Don't Say a Word, MissaX/Pulse; Derrick Pierce, Primary, Lust Cinema; Tommy Pistol, iLove, Wicked Passions; Michael Vegas, Out With a Bang, Digital Playground/Pulse; Chad White, Who's Your Daddy?, MissaX/Pulse
Female Foreign Performer of the Year	Male Foreign Performer of the Year
Little Caprice; Alexis Crystal; Anna de Ville; Cassie Del Isla; **Clea Gaultier**; Angelika Grays; Jasmine Jae; Anissa Kate; Tina Kay; Nelly Kent; Cherry Kiss; Jia Lissa; Liya Silver; Sybil; Tiffany Tatum; Eva Elfie	Mike Angelo; Alberto Blanco; Marcello Bravo; Kristof Cale; Christian Clay; Danny D.; Charlie Dean; Dorian Del Isla; Erik Everhard; Angelo Godshack; Freddy Gong; Vince Karter; Joss Lescaf; **Rocco Siffredi**; Jay Snakes
Best Supporting Actress	Best Supporting Actor
Joanna Angel, The Path to Forgiveness, AllHerLuv/Pulse; Vanna Bardot, A Killer on the Loose, MissaX/Pulse; Adriana Chechik, Muse, Deeper; Kenna James, Pushing Boundaries, MissaX; Avi Love, The Ex-Girlfriend Debacle, GirlGirl/Jules Jordan; **Kira Noir, Primary, Lust Cinema**; Penny Pax, Primary, Lust Cinema; Demi Sutra, Prison Heat, Sweetheart/Mile High; Daisy Taylor, The Path to Forgiveness, AllHerLuv/Pulse; Whitney Wright, The Producer II, AllHerLuv	Brad Armstrong, Finding Rebecca, Wicked Pictures; Dante Colle, A Killer on the Loose, MissaX/Pulse; Stirling Cooper, Obsessed, Sweet Sinner/Mile High; **Xander Corvus, The Summoning, Digital Playground/Pulse**; Damon Dice, Stranger Than Fiction, Wicked Pictures; Small Hands, Primary, Lust Cinema; Lance Hart, Some TS Like It Hot, TransSensual/Mile High; Scott Nails, Exit 118, Digital Playground/Pulse; Brad Newman, Don't Say a Word, MissaX/Pulse; Zac Wild, Catfished 2, Sweet Sinner/Mile High
Best Featurette	Best Foreign Production
A Beautiful Mistake, MissaX; Chemistry Eases the Pain, Pink and White Productions; **Fashionistas Lost, EvilAngel.com**; Keep Your Family Close, Pure Taboo/Pulse; Mirror Game, Sssh.com; Mom's Not Coming Back, Sweetheart, Pure Taboo/AdultTime.com; Romantic Charades, AllHerLuv; Transgressions: A Sovereign Syre Story, Pure Taboo/AdultTime.com; What Set Us Apart (f. True Lesbian), Adult Time/Pulse; Writer's Block (f. Social Experiment), PornFidelity/Kelly Madison/Juicy	Bikini Models, Scarlett Revell/Adult Source; Harmony's Extreme, Harmony Films; I Fucking Love Berlin, ZoZo/Evil Angel; **Impulses, Dorcel**; Jacky, Jacquie et Michel Elite; Love Is Blind, JoyBear/Pulse; Manuel's Euro Tour: Paris, Jules Jordan Video; No Mercy for Mankind, Digital Playground/Pulse; Sicalipsis, Union/Canal+; Super Host, Lightsouthern/Pure Play
Director of the Year	Best Editing
James Avalon; Kay Brandt; Axel Braun; Manuel Ferrara; Ricky Greenwood; Jules Jordan; **Kayden Kross**; Mason; Pat Myne; Eddie Powell; Mike Quasar; Jacky St. James; Chris Streams; Paul Woodcrest; Missa X	Cougar Queen: A Tiger King Parody, Girlsway Productions; Woody All-In; I Fucking Love Berlin, ZoZo/Evil Angel; Scott RR Driscoll; Influence Elsa Jean, Tushy; Han Foley; A Killer on the Loose, MissaX/Pulse; Milo Popp & Bob le Flambeur; Lana, BurningAngel Entertainment; Small Hands; **Muse, Deeper; Duboko**; Paranormal, GirlGirl/Jules Jordan; Zombie; The Path to Forgiveness, AllHerLuv/Pulse; Missa X; Sicalipsis, Union/Canal+; Cosmo Liveti; The Summoning, Digital Playground/Pulse; Alexplose, Papa McMuffin, Margot Misandry & Mike Lee Torres
Best Special Effects	Best Soundtrack
Elf, UnrealPorn.com; Fetish Dreamland, SevereSexFilms.com; Lana, BurningAngel Entertainment; Mirror Game, Sssh.com; No Mercy for Mankind, Digital Playground/Pulse; Out With a Bang, Digital Playground/Pulse; **Paranormal, GirlGirl/Jules Jordan**; The Summoning, Digital Playground/Pulse; T-Girl Space Pirates, Bad Girl Mafia/Joy; Take My Soul, MeanaWolf.com	Girlcore: The Complete Second Season, Adult Time/Pulse; Jacky, Jacquie et Michel Elite; Jane's Anal Addiction, Darkko/Evil Angel; **Lana, BurningAngel Entertainment**; Lesbian Rockstars, GirlGirl/Jules Jordan; Muse, Deeper; Oiled & Spoiled 2, Belladonna/Evil Angel; Primary, Lust Cinema; Sicalipsis, Union/Canal+; The Summoning, Digital Playground/Pulse
Best Directing – Comedy	Cougar Queen: A Tiger King Parody, Girlsway Productions; Casey Calvert & Eli Cross
Best Directing – Drama	Muse, Kayden Kross
Best Directing – Foreign Production	A Perfect Woman, Dorcel/Wicked; Hervé Bodilis
Best Directing – Non-Narrative Production	The Insatiable Emily Willis, Jules Jordan Video; Jules Jordan
Best Director – Site/Network Content	Laurent Sky, Vixen.com/Tushy.com/Blacked.com
All-Girl Performer of the Year	Charlotte Stokely
Best All-Girl Group Sex Scene	Paranormal, GirlGirl/Jules Jordan; Emily Willis, Riley Reid & Kristen Scott
Best All-Girl Movie or Anthology	Paranormal, GirlGirl/Jules Jordan
Best All-Girl Series or Site	Women Seeking Women, Girlfriends Films
Best Anal Movie or Anthology	The Art of Anal Sex 11, Tushy/Pulse
Best Anal Series or Site	Anal Angels, Tushy/Pulse
Best Anal Sex Scene	Rocco's Back to America for More Adventures, Rocco Siffredi/Evil Angel; Jane Wilde & Rocco Siffredi
Best Art Direction	Muse, Deeper
Best BDSM Movie or Anthology	Mistress Maitland, Deeper/Pulse
Best Blowbang Scene	Emily Willis 10 Man Blowbang (f. Facialized 7), Hard X/O.L. Entertainment; Emily Willis
