= Female Performer of the Year =

Female Performer of the Year may refer to:

- AVN Award for Female Performer of the Year
- XBIZ Award for Female Performer of the Year
