= Michael Raven =

American pornographic film director (born 1964)

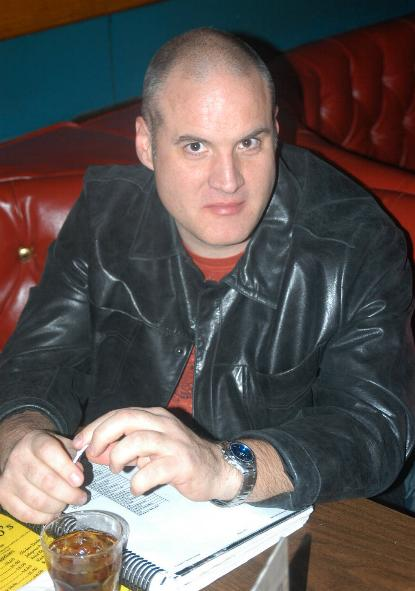
- Raven in 2006
- Born: Michael Bryan; 1964 (age 60–61); Dallas, Texas
- Spouse: Sydnee Steele (m. 1992; div. 2001)

Michael Raven (born 1964) is an American pornographic film director. He is a member of the AVN Hall of Fame.

Raven met his wife Sydnee Steele while working as a car salesman. They married, finding a common interest in pornography and swinging, and moved to Los Angeles, California to turn their hobbies into careers. Their marriage lasted for ten years.

== Awards ==
- 2001 AVN Award - Best Editing, Film (Watchers) with Sammy Slater
- 2001 AVN Award - Best Screenplay, Film (Watchers) with George Kaplan
- 2003 AVN Award - Best Director, Video (Breathless)
- 2003 AVN Award - Best Screenplay, Film (Breathless) with Devan Sapphire
- 2004 AVN Award - Best Director, Video (Beautiful)
- 2004 AVN Award - Best Screenplay, Video (Beautiful)
- 2008 AVN Hall of Fame inductee
