= Abella Danger =

American pornographic film actress (born 1995)

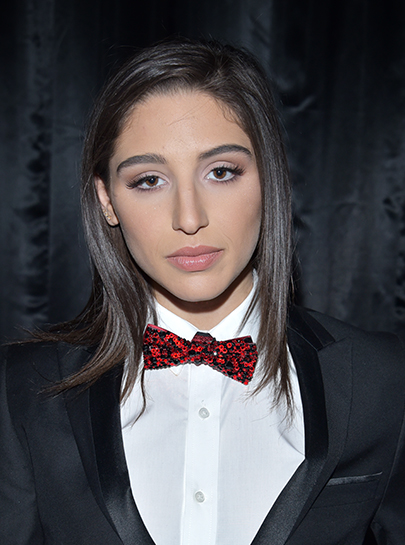
- Danger in 2017
- Born: November 19, 1995 (age 31); Miami, Florida, U.S.
- Other name: Bella Danger
- Occupation: Pornographic film actress
- Years active: 2014–2022

Abella Danger (born November 19, 1995) is an American pornographic film actress and director.

== Early life ==
Danger was born and raised in Miami, Florida. Danger went to South Miami Middle School.

== Career ==
Danger made her adult film debut in July 2014 for Bang Bros. She later moved to Los Angeles, California. Fortune has described her as one of the most popular and in-demand performers in the business. She has also worked as a director.

In 2019, Danger was cast in Her & Him, the directorial porn debut of mainstream Hollywood actress Bella Thorne. The short film is produced by Pornhub and is the third film in the company's Visionaries Director's Club series. Danger also features in the second film in the series, I Love You.

Danger contributed vocals and appears in the music video to the song, "911", by Israeli EDM producer and DJ Borgore off his second studio album, The Art of Gore.

In February 2021, Danger starred in Thorne's music video for Shake It, which featured the two engaged in simulated sexual activity that led to the video being taken down from YouTube shortly after its premiere, after it was taken down, the video became available again. The appearance was noted as a continuation of a mutually beneficial collaboration between the two, providing Thorne with legitimacy in the adult entertainment community and providing Danger with wider mainstream exposure.

In 2022, Danger posed with mainstream Hollywood actress Denise Richards, to recreate a scene from the film Wild Things (1998), which Danger initiated after learning that Richards had joined OnlyFans. On January 7, 2023, Danger co-hosted the AVN Awards with Reya Sunshine, which marked the show's return to a live audience for the first time since 2020. In 2023, Danger was deemed the "Most Popular Female Performer" at the Fifth Annual Pornhub Awards. The same year, Danger was viewed over 1.89 billion times on Pornhub, more than any other performer.

Danger retired from the adult industry, and since 2024, she has been studying at the University of Miami with the goal of becoming an attorney and sports agent.

== Personal life ==
In 2018, Danger was in a relationship with singer Gaby Guerrero (Gaby G), and appeared in her music video "City on Fire", playing a character luring the singer to the dark side of Los Angeles.

== Awards ==
Year	Event	Award	Film
2016	AVN Award	Best New Starlet	—N/a
2016	XBIZ Award	Best New Starlet	—N/a
2016	XRCO Award	Best New Starlet	—N/a
2016	AVN Award	Hottest Newcomer	—N/a
2016	Doppio Senso Night Award	Best International New Starlet	—N/a
2016	NightMoves Award	Best Female Performer (Editor's Choice)	—N/a
2017	AVN Award	Best Star Showcase	Abella
2017	AVN Award	Best Double Penetration Sex Scene (with Markus Dupree and Mick Blue)	Abella
2017	AVN Award	Best Virtual Reality Sex Scene (with Joanna Angel and Manuel Ferrara)	Angel 'n Danger
2017	NightMoves Award	Best Butt (Editor's Choice)	—N/a
2017	NightMoves Award	Best All Girl Release (Fan's Choice)	Riley & Abella
2018	XBIZ Award	Best Sex Scene – Gonzo Release (with Markus Dupree)	Fucking Flexible 2
2018	XBIZ Award	Best Sex Scene – Comedy Release (with Joanna Angel and Isiah Maxwell)	Jews Love Black Cock
2018	XRCO Award	Orgasmic Analist	—N/a
2018	NightMoves Award	Best Butt (Editor's Choice)	—N/a
2018	Pornhub Award	Top Squirting Performer	—N/a
2019	AVN Award	Most Epic Ass	—N/a
2019	AVN Award	Best Group Sex Scene (with Angela White, Kira Noir, Mia Malkova, Tori Black, Ana Foxxx, Jessa Rhodes, Vicki Chase, Mick Blue, Alex Jones, Bambino, Ricky Johnson, and Ryan Driller)	After Dark
2019	Fleshbot Award	Best Group Sex Scene (with Angela White, Kira Noir, Mia Malkova, Tori Black, Ana Foxxx, Jessa Rhodes, Vicki Chase, Mick Blue, Alex Jones, Bambino, Ricky Johnson, and Ryan Driller)	After Dark
2019	XRCO Award	Awesome Analist	—N/a
2019	NightMoves Award	Best Butt (Fan's Choice)	—N/a
2019	Pornhub Award	Most Popular Female Pornstar by Women	—N/a
2019	Pornhub Award	Best Instagram	—N/a
2019	Pornhub Award	Hottest Ass	—N/a
2020	AVN Award	Most Epic Ass	—N/a
2020	XBIZ Award	Best Sex Scene – Erotic-Themed (with Small Hands)	Her and Him
2020	XRCO Award	Awesome Analist	—N/a
2020	Pornhub Award	Top Squirting Performer	—N/a
2020	Pornhub Award	Hottest Ass	—N/a
2021	AVN Award	Most Epic Ass	—N/a
2021	Fleshbot Award	Best Ass	—N/a
2022	AVN Award	Most Epic Ass	—N/a
2022	Pornhub Award	Top Anal Performer	—N/a
2022	Pornhub Award	Hottest Ass	—N/a
2023	AVN Award	Most Amazing Ass	—N/a
2023	Pornhub Award	Most Popular Female Performer	—N/a
2023	Pornhub Award	Hottest Ass	—N/a
2024	AVN Award	Most Amazing Ass	—N/a
2024	Urban X Award	Hall of Fame	—N/a
2024	Pornhub Award	Hottest Ass	—N/a
2025	AVN Award	Most Amazing Ass	—N/a
2026	AVN Award	Most Amazing Ass	—N/a
