= Pornucopia =

- Genre: Television documentary
- Country of origin: United States
- Original language: English
- No. of episodes: 6

Original release
- Network: HBO
- Release: June 16, 2004

Pornucopia is an American documentary series by HBO spin off from Real Sex that focuses on the Californian porn industry. It featured interviews with Jenna Jameson, Jenna Haze, Katie Morgan, Dave Cummings, Evan Stone, Jeff Stryker, Stormy Daniels and many more.

== Episode list ==
Episode	Title	Description
1	Perky and Punctual	Auditions at the World Modeling Agency, the AVN Awards, JK Productions
2	Women on Top	The Internet, Danni Ashe, pioneers, webcasts
3	"Same Sex" Sex	Girlfriends Films, SIR Video Productions, The Live and Raw Hotel, Jeff Stryker, Big Blue Productions
4	The Business of Kink	Vaniity, Dave Cummings
5	Love and/or Sex	Couples and spouses, Dave Friedman, Jonathan Morgan
6	Questions, Anyone?	Viagra, parodies, Katie Morgan, AVN Awards
