= Julie Meadows =

American pornographic actress, writer (born 1974)

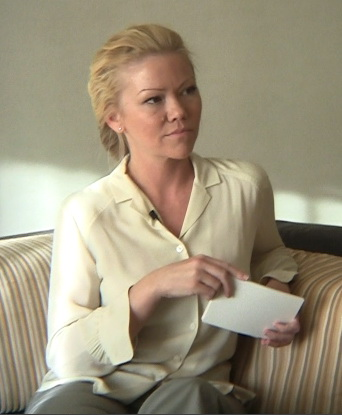
- Born: Lydia Lee; February 3, 1974 (age 52); Texarkana, Texas, U.S.
- Other name: Julia Meadows
- Occupations: Writer; web designer; pornographic actress; documentarian
- Height: 5 ft 6 in (1.68 m)
- Website: juliemeadows.com

Julie Meadows (born Lydia Lee; February 3, 1974) is an American writer, web designer and former pornographic actress, who became a documentarian after retiring from the adult film industry. She was active in the industry from 1998 to 2004 and is sometimes said to resemble the actress Julia Stiles.

== Early life and education ==
Born on February 3, 1974, in Texarkana, Texas, Meadows has three sisters. She married at the age of 17 and gave birth to a son just after their first anniversary.

== Career ==
Meadows met the film director Michael Raven while dancing in Dallas. She moved to Los Angeles, California, six months later, where she began working in adult films in 1998. Her first film was Ed Powers' Dirty Debutantes 94.

Meadows was a contract performer for VCA for two years, before leaving in January 2003. She retired from the adult industry in 2004; she later stated her reason for retiring was that she was no longer interested in making movies.

In March 2010, Meadows appeared in a Public Service Announcement for the Free Speech Coalition on the topic of Internet infringement of adult content, directed by Michael Whiteacre. The spot, entitled the "FSC All-Star Anti-Piracy PSA," found Meadows in the company of adult performers such as Lisa Ann, Kimberly Kane, Ron Jeremy, and Wicked Pictures contract stars Alektra Blue and Kaylani Lei.

On February 14, 2011, Meadows (as Lydia Lee) and producing/directing partner Michael Whiteacre released the first two episodes of their documentary, The Devil And Shelley Lubben, a biographical exposé of anti-pornography crusader Shelley Lubben starring Meadows, Kayden Kross, Nina Hartley, Monica Foster, Melissa Monet and Danny Wylde. She backed out of working on later episodes though.

== Awards and nominations ==
Year	Ceremony	Result	Award	Work
2000	Hot d'Or Award	Nominated	Best American New Starlet	—N/a
2000	XRCO Award	Nominated	Starlet of the Year	—N/a
2001	AVN Award	Nominated	Best Actress – Film	Watchers
2001	NightMoves Award	Won	Best Actress (Editor's Choice)	—N/a
2002	AVN Award	Won	Best Supporting Actress – Film	Fade To Black
2002	AVN Award	Nominated	Best Group Sex Scene – Video (with Alec Metro & Allysin Chaynes)	Let's Play Doctor
2003	AVN Award	Nominated	Best Actress – Video	Sex World 2002
2004	AVN Award	Nominated	Best Supporting Actress – Film	Mirror Image
