= Kira Noir =

American pornographic film actress (born 1994 or 1995)

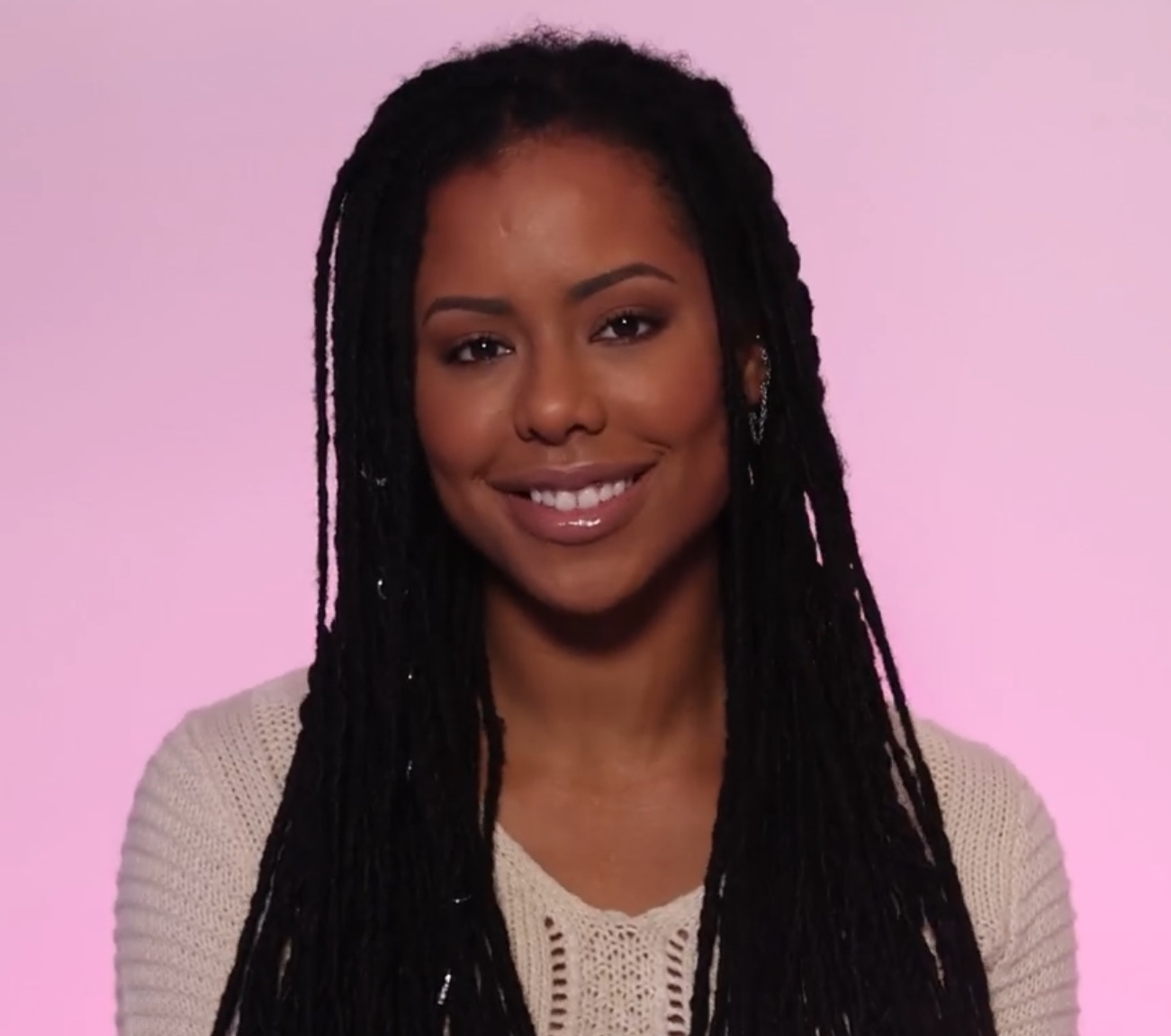
- Noir in 2022
- Born: 1994 or 1995 (age 31–32); California, U.S.
- Occupations: Pornographic film actress; activist
- Years active: 2014–present

Kira Noir (born 1994 or 1995) is an American pornographic film actress and activist who has been active in the industry since 2014. She has won and been nominated for multiple awards throughout her career, including winning the AVN Award for Female Performer of the Year in 2023, the AVN Award for Best Actress in 2024, and the AVN Award for Best Supporting Actress in three consecutive years.

== Career ==
Born in California and raised in Nashville, Tennessee, Noir stated she had a difficult time finding a job after graduating from high school. She took on a job as a stripper, including at Larry Flynt's Hustler Club in St. Louis, a job which she stated she enjoyed due to the work culture. Her move into the adult film industry came after she had seen Bonnie Rotten and was inspired by her stage presence. She also cited actresses such as Skin Diamond and Stoya as personal inspirations.

One of Noir's films was the directorial debut of Ana Foxxx, Filthy Fashion Models. She attended her first AVN Adult Entertainment Expo in 2016.

Noir digitally hosted, along with fellow adult film star Skyler Lo, the 38th AVN Awards. She signed an exclusive contract with Brazzers in 2023, and has since featured multiple films by the company.

Outside of the adult film industry, she appeared in a 2018 music video by pornographic film actor Small Hands, as well as a G-Eazy music video.

=== Activism ===
Noir was also one of the actresses selected for Pornhub's Sextainability series. The partnership with the environmental initiative 2030 or Bust had Noir, along with many other actresses, produce solo videos which promoted environmental causes. She has also advocated for open discussions of consent, emphasizing its importance to a healthy sex life.

She has been critical of how the adult film industry treats black women, particularly the framing of interracial pornography between black women and white men. She was also elected to the Performer Availability Screening Service (PASS) Board of Directors in 2025, alongside fellow actresses RubyLynne and Beth McKenna.

== Personal life ==
Murals of Noir have been painted in Kenya, the country of her family's origin.

== Awards ==
- 2018 Urban X Award – Best Anal Performer
- 2019 AVN Award – Best Group Sex Scene – After Dark
- 2019 XCritic Award – Best Girl on Girl Action (Scene) – Tough Critic
- 2020 XBIZ Award – Best Sex Scene - Comedy – 3 Cheers for Satan
- 2020 XRCO Award – Unsung Siren
- 2020 XCritic Award – Best Girl on Girl Action (Scene) – The Path to Forgiveness
- 2021 XBIZ Award – Best Sex Scene - All Girl – Primary
- 2021 AVN Award – Best Supporting Actress – Primary
- 2021 AVN Award – Mainstream Venture of the Year
- 2022 AVN Award – Best Supporting Actress – Casey: A True Story
- 2023 AVN Award – Female Performer of the Year
- 2023 AVN Award – Best Supporting Actress – Sorrow Bay
- 2023 XBIZ Award – Best Sex Scene - Trans – Muses: Eva Maxim
- 2023 Pornhub Award – Top Blowjob Performer - Female
- 2023 Fleshbot Award – Best Sex Scene-Translesbian – More
- 2024 XBIZ Award – Best Sex Scene - Feature Movie – Climax 3
- 2024 AVN Award – Best Leading Actress – Machine Gunner
- 2024 AVN Award – Best Oral Sex Scene – Machine Gunner
- 2024 AVN Award – Best Tag-Team Sex Scene – Machine Gunner
- 2024 XRCO Award – Best Actress – Machine Gunner
- 2024 NightMoves Award – Best Actress
- 2025 XMA Award – Best Sex Scene - Orgy/Group – Brazzers Presents: 20 for 20
- 2025 AVN Award – Best Foursome/Orgy Scene – Brazzers Presents: 20 for 20
- 2025 Urban X Award – Best Actress
- 2026 AVN Award – Best Girl/Girl Sex Scene – Hot and Mean 38
- 2026 Urban X Hall of Fame
