= Jenna Haze =

American pornographic film actress (born 1982)

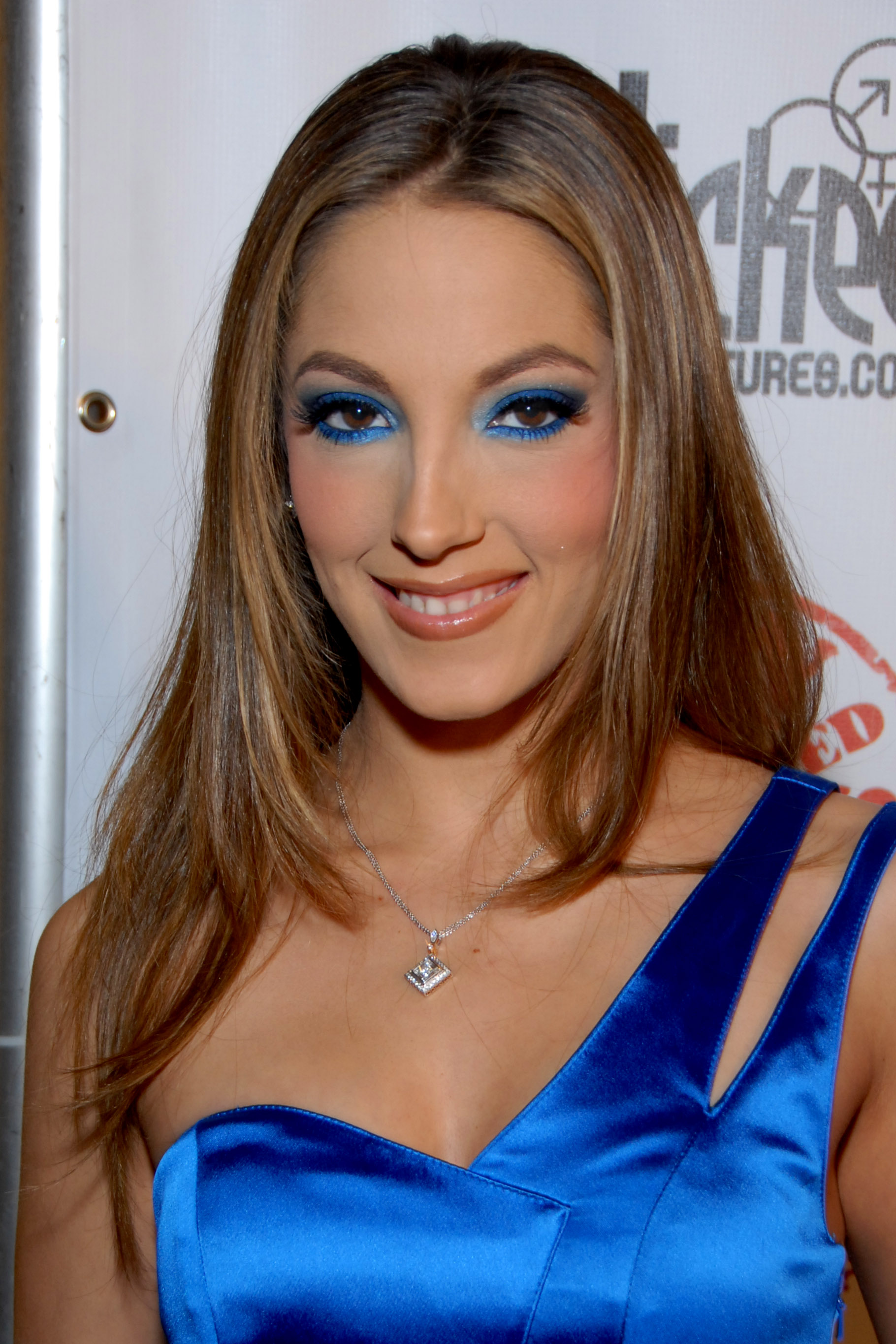
- Haze in 2009
- Born: 1982 (age 43–44)
- Occupation: Pornographic film actress
- Years active: 2001–2019
- Website: jennahaze.com

Jenna Haze (born 1982) is an American former pornographic film actress. Haze has won numerous pornography industry awards, including the 2003 AVN Award for Best New Starlet and the 2009 AVN Award for Female Performer of the Year, making her the second performer in history to win both awards in the course of her career, after Missy. In 2012, she was inducted into both the AVN and XRCO Halls of Fame.

== Career ==
Haze entered the adult film industry on July 18, 2001. Between 2002 and 2005, she was a contract performer for the film company Jill Kelly Productions (JKP). During most of her time at the company, she performed exclusively with women, out of loyalty to her then-boyfriend, an industry cameraman. She returned to working with men in the 2006 multi-award-winning release Jenna Haze Darkside, produced by Jules Jordan.

In February 2002, Haze appeared in a scene for Jill Kelly Productions (JKP). Soon after signing with JKP, she formed a serious relationship with an industry cameraman and began a three-year period of performing exclusively with women. At the 2003 AVN Awards ceremony, Haze was named Best New Starlet and her masturbation scene in Big Bottom Sadie was awarded Best Solo Sex Scene. In 2004, she appeared on the HBO show Pornucopia, a six-part documentary on the pornography industry in California.

Haze became a free agent in April 2005, after deciding not to renew her contract with JKP, partly because Jill Kelly had recently left the company. After leaving JKP and splitting with her boyfriend, Haze returned to working with male performers. The April 2006 release Jenna Haze Darkside featured her first heterosexual sex scenes in over three years. The film was produced and directed by her new boyfriend Jules Jordan. Later in the year, she began writing a sex advice column for the pornographic magazine, Fox.

Her film work was also rewarded in 2007, with AVN Awards for Best Oral Sex Scene (Video) and Best Group Sex Scene (Video), as well as a nomination for Female Performer of the Year.

In April 2007, Jenna Haze Oil Orgy became the first adult movie to be released on three high definition formats, Blu-ray, HD DVD and DVD-WMV.

In January 2008, her scene with Manuel Ferrara in Evil Anal 2 won the AVN Award for Best Couples Sex Scene (Video). In August 2008, Haze achieved the first feature dancing award of her career winning Adult Movie Entertainer of the Year in the 11th annual Adult Nightclub and Exotic Dancer Awards. On January 10, 2009, Haze and Belladonna hosted the 2009 AVN Awards, and Haze won Female Performer of the Year.

In 2010, Complex ranked Haze sixteenth on their list of "The 50 Prettiest Porn Stars of All Time" and fifth on their list of "The 10 Hottest Orange County Women." Complex also ranked her twentieth on their list of "The Top 100 Hottest Porn Stars (Right Now)" in 2011. She was also placed on CNBC's yearly list of "The Dirty Dozen: Porn's Most Popular Stars" in 2011 and 2012.

On February 7, 2012, Haze announced her retirement from performing via a homemade YouTube video, followed by a press release. She revealed that she had not shot a scene since April 2011, but she would possibly continue to direct and produce.

=== Jennaration X Studios ===
In 2009, Haze launched her own production company, Jennaration X Studios, headed by Haze and distributed through Jules Jordan Video. Haze is directing and performing in her production films.

=== Appearances ===
In the 2007 mainstream comedy film Superbad Haze made a short appearance in the role of Vagtastic Voyage Girl #2. Haze made a short appearance in the 2009 action/thriller film Crank: High Voltage as a porn star on strike.

Published in 2007, Haze was among the adult stars featured in the erotic photography book Naked Ambition: An R-Rated Look at an X-Rated Industry. The special edition of the book included a fine art photograph of Haze signed by the photographer Michael Grecco.

Shortly after announcing her retirement in 2012, Haze appeared in the March edition of the men's magazine FHM in a layout with former Gossip Girl star Taylor Momsen, and shortly thereafter had a cameo in Momsen's band The Pretty Reckless' music video for the song "My Medicine". She then appeared onstage with the band at their March 13 Los Angeles House of Blues performance and gave Momsen an impromptu lap dance. Haze again appeared in the video for the band's 2026 release "When I Wake Up".

In 2025, Haze was the cover model for the artwork of American black metal band Deafheaven's album Lonely People with Power.

== Awards ==
- 2003 AVN Award for Best New Starlet
- 2003 AVN Award for Best Solo Sex Scene – Big Bottom Sadie
- 2006 F.A.M.E. Award for Fan Favorite Best Butt
- 2006 NightMoves Award for Best All Sex/Gonzo Release (Fan's Choice) – Jenna Haze Darkside
- 2007 AVN Award for Best Oral Sex Scene, Video – Jenna Haze Darkside
- 2007 AVN Award for Best Group Sex Scene, Video – Fashionistas Safado: The Challenge
- 2007 XRCO Award for Best On-Screen Chemistry – Fashionistas Safado: The Challenge
- 2007 F.A.M.E. Award for Favorite Oral Starlet
- 2007 F.A.M.E. Award for Favorite Gonzo Movie –Jenna Haze Dark Side
- 2007 FICEB Ninfa Award for Most Original Sex Scene – Fashionistas Safado
- 2008 AVN Award for Best Couple Sex Scene, Video – Evil Anal 2
- 2008 XRCO Award for Orgasmic Oralist
- 2008 F.A.M.E. Award for Favorite Anal Starlet
- 2009 AVN Award for Female Performer of the Year
- 2009 AVN Award for Best Tease Performance – Pretty As They Cum
- 2009 XBIZ Award for Female Performer of the Year
- 2009 XRCO Award for Female Performer of the Year
- 2009 F.A.M.E. Award for Dirtiest Girl In Porn
- 2009 F.A.M.E. Award for Favorite Oral Starlet
- 2009 NightMoves Award for Best Feature Dancer (Editor's Choice)
- 2009 Hot d'Or Award for Best American Female Performer
- 2010 XFANZ Award for Female Star of the Year
- 2010 XRCO Award for Orgasmic Analist
- 2010 F.A.M.E. Award for Dirtiest Girl In Porn
- 2010 F.A.M.E. Award for Favorite Anal Starlet
- 2010 Fame Registry Award for Most Popular Pornstar
- 2011 AVN Award for Best All-Girl Couples Sex Scene – Meow!
- 2011 AVN Award for Fan Favorite Performer
- 2011 XRCO Award for Orgasmic Oralist
- 2011 NightMoves Award for Best Feature Dancer (Fan's Choice)
- 2011 Fame Registry Award for MVP of the Year
- 2011 Fame Registry Award for Most Popular Pornstar
- 2012 Fame Registry Award for Most Popular Pornstar
- 2012 AVN Hall of Fame inductee
- 2012 XRCO Hall of Fame inductee

Jennaration X Studios:

- 2011 AVN Award for Best All-Sex Release – Just Jenna
- 2011 AVN Award for Best All-Girl Release – Meow!
- 2011 AVN Award for Best Young Release – Cum Spoiled Brats

== Personal life ==
According to her social media pages, Haze returned to school and majored in psychology.

In 2012 and 2013, Haze was romantically involved with heavy metal singer Greg Puciato of the band the Dillinger Escape Plan.
