= Bobbi Starr =

American pornographic film actress (born 1983)

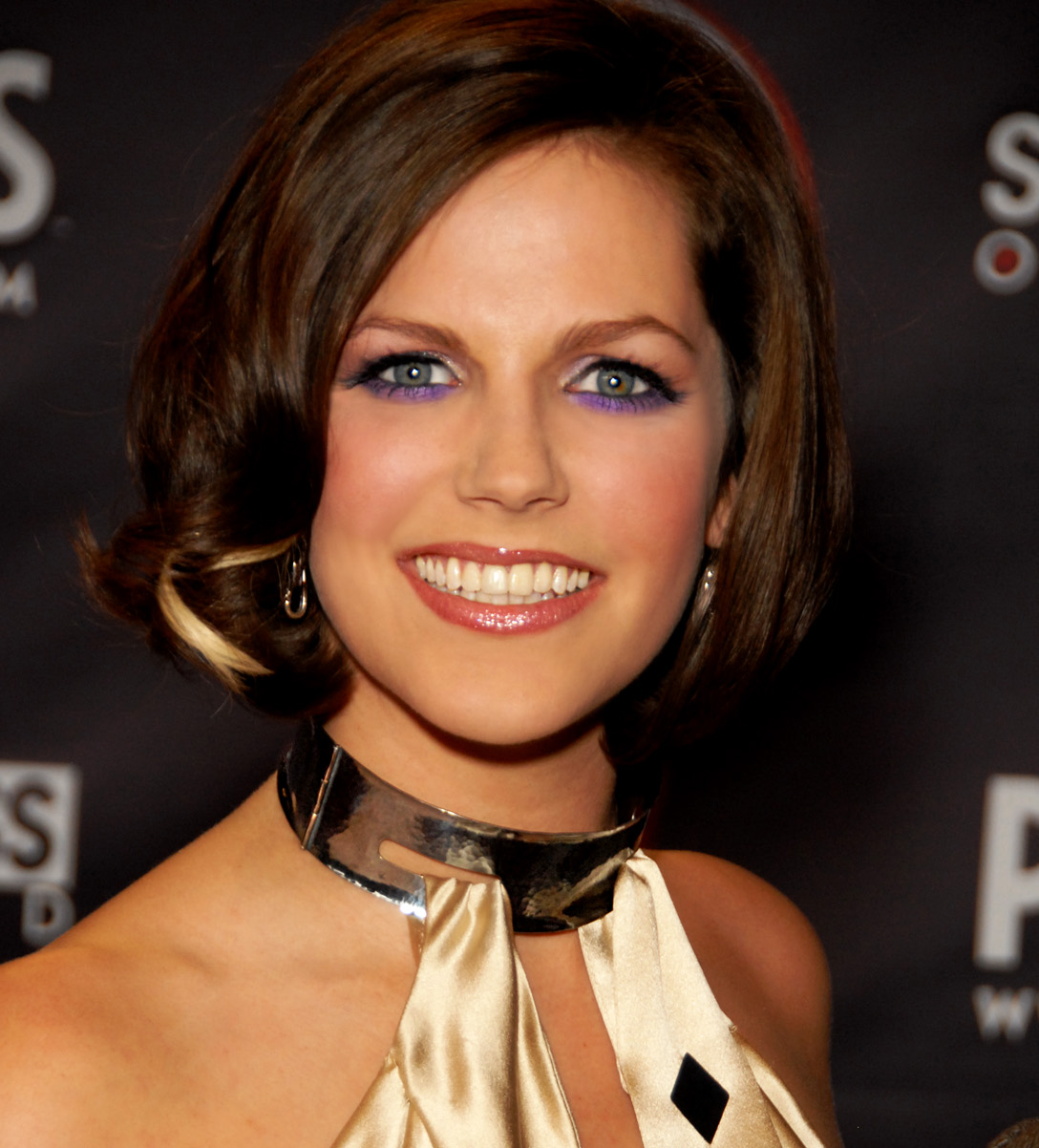
- Starr in 2010
- Born: 1983 (age 42–43); Santa Clara, California, U.S.
- Occupation: Pornographic film actress

Bobbi Starr (born 1983) is an American pornographic film actress. She won the AVN Award for Female Performer of the Year in 2012 and was inducted into the AVN Hall of Fame in 2026.

== Early life and education ==
Born in Santa Clara, California and raised in an upper-middle-class family, Starr was homeschooled early in life. She competed in the Junior Olympics in swimming, studied the oboe and graduated from San Jose State University. She has expressed an ambition to study pre-med with the aim of becoming a gynecologist. Her intent was to work within the adult entertainment industry, where she identified a lack of female gynecologists.

== Pornographic film career ==
At age 22, Starr begin performing in fetish scenes for Kink.com before transitioning into more mainstream pornography. Starr was named by CNBC as one of the 12 most popular pornographic film actresses in 2011 and 2013. Starr has directed films for adult film distributor Evil Angel, beginning with Bobbi's World (2011), a female POV movie.

Starr was a finalist for the reality show America's Next Hot Porn Star, a series set up similarly to America's Next Top Model. She blogged for Popporn.com and wrote a column for Fox Magazine called "Adventures in Porny Land", and was featured in a book by Frederick Community College professor Rich Moreland about feminists in the pornography industry.

== Personal life ==
Starr has said she does not label her sexual orientation, but considers herself "more gay than straight". In 2013, Starr announced on her blog that she was expecting a child.

== Awards ==
As Performer
Year	Award	Category/Movie
2009	XRCO Award	Superslut
2010	AVN Award	Most Outrageous Sex Scene: Belladonna: No Warning 4
2010	AVN Award	Best Double Penetration Sex Scene: Bobbi Starr & Dana DeArmond's Insatiable Voyage
2010	XRCO Award	Superslut
2010	XRCO Award	Orgasmic Oralist
2011	XRCO Award	Orgasmic Analist
2012	AVN Award	Female Performer of the Year
2012	AVN Award	Best POV Sex Scene: Double Vision 3
2012	AVN Award	Best Porn Star Website: BobbiStarr.com
2012	XRCO Award	Orgasmic Analist
2026	AVN Award	Hall of Fame

As Director/Producer
Award	Category	Movie
2012 AVN Award	Best All-Sex Release, Mixed Format	Bobbi's World
2013 AVN Award	Best Gonzo Release	Bobbi Violates San Francisco
2013 XCritic Award	Best All Girl Release	Kiss Me Lick Me Fuck Me
