= Melissa Hill =

American pornographic film actress

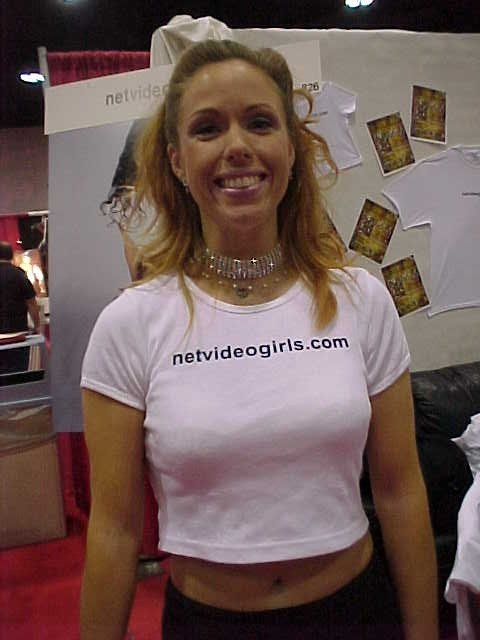
- Hill in 2001
- Occupation: Pornographic film actress

Melissa Hill is a American retired pornographic film actress. She was inducted into the AVN Hall of Fame in 2014 and XRCO Hall of Fame in 2015.

== Career ==
Hill began her career in the adult entertainment industry in 1993, appearing in more than 250 movies over the next ten years until her retirement. Over the course of her career, she was nominated for several AVN Awards. Hill won the Best Actress—Film award in 1997 for Penetrator 2 (Pleasure Productions). In 1998, she was named Best Supporting Actress—Film for Paul Thomas' Bad Wives (Vivid Entertainment).

Hill served as Second Vice President of the Adult Performers Actors Guild (APAG) from 2016 to 2017. She has also appeared in a variety of mainstream productions, such as the porn-themed comedy Orgazmo from South Park creators Trey Parker and Matt Stone. She also has acted in non-sex roles, including the 2013 film Measure X.

== Awards ==
- 1997 AVN Award – Best All-Girl Sex Scene, Film (Dreams of Desire)
- 1997 AVN Award – Best Actress—Film (Penetrator 2: Grudge Day)
- 1998 AVN Award – Best Supporting Actress—Film (Bad Wives)
- 2014 AVN Hall of Fame
- 2015 XRCO Hall of Fame

== Personal life ==
Hill is a San Francisco native, and she spent most of her childhood studying ballet, even becoming an instructor for five years after graduating from high school.
