= Sydnee Steele =

American pornographic film actress (born 1968/1969)

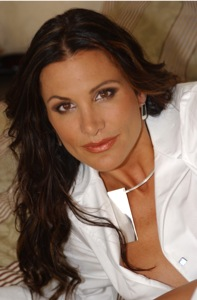
- Born: 1968 or 1969 (age 57–58); Dallas, Texas, U.S.
- Other names: Sydnee; Sidney Steele; Sydnee Steel
- Occupations: Sex therapist; author; pornographic film actress
- Spouse: Michael Raven (m. 1992; div. 2001)

Sydnee Steele (born 1968 or 1969) is an American sex therapist, author, and former pornographic film actress. She appeared in over 300 pornographic films before her retirement in 2005.

== Early life ==
Steele was born in Dallas, Texas, the daughter of a college professor. She has described herself as having been a very shy and introverted child, relating in a 2001 interview with AVN, "I used to hide behind my parents' legs when people would say hi to me." Before entering pornography, she held a position as a financial officer at a yacht company in Texas.

== Career ==
=== Pornographic film ===
In the early 1990s, while working as a jewelry saleswoman in a Dallas shopping mall, Steele met Michael Raven, a car salesman who sold her a new Miata. They married, finding a common interest in pornography and swinging, and moved to Los Angeles, California to turn their hobbies into careers. Their marriage lasted for ten years, during which Raven became a well-known pornographic film director. The couple opted not to have children.

Steele was introduced to the industry through a friend, A.J. Crowell, who at the time was publisher and owner of Sundown, a Texas adult entertainment listings guide. Her debut performance in the adult entertainment industry involved being painted like a zebra in a three-girl scene in The Queen's Challenge (1997), with Anna Malle and Jade St. Clair. She remained freelance in the early part of her career, working with many adult film production companies including Elegant Angel, Metro Studios, New Sensations, Sin City, VCA Pictures and Vivid Entertainment.

In 2001 she signed an exclusive contract with Wicked Pictures, becoming a "Wicked Girl". After that she performed in mostly plot-based pornographic films (also known as features) and began winning awards. She was awarded the 2002 AVN Award for Best Actress for her role in the film. She was again nominated for Best Actress in 2003 for Falling From Grace and in 2004 for Lost And Found.

After her Wicked contract she says she received media coverage in nationally distributed publications, including The New York Times, Time and Premiere.

In 2004, while filming Pillow Talk, directed by Devinn Lane, she told Adult Video News that she had fallen in love with a man from outside the industry, and would only perform girl-girl scenes. It would turn out to be her last pornographic film. Steele left the industry in April 2005.

In 2007, she was inducted into the AVN Hall of Fame.

=== Other ventures ===
From 2002 to 2004 Steele wrote "The Steele Factor", a monthly column discussing pornography, sexuality and free speech for AVN. She has written several articles for AVN Online and Club Magazine.

After retiring from pornography, Steele studied under Dr. Patti Britton, author of The Art of Sex Coaching, to become a certified Pranic practitioner and sex coach, to help couples learn new sexual techniques to improve their sex lives and their relationships. Steele has written a book with hypnotherapist Luke Chao entitled Seducing Your Woman (Burman Books, June 1, 2006, ISBN 978-0-9737166-7-2), a book meant as a guide for men to assist in building sexual confidence and knowledge.

In July 2007, Steele was scheduled to speak as a relationship consultant at the New York State Bar Association's Family Law Section, but her talk was canceled when her past as a pornographic film actress was revealed.

== Awards ==
X-Rated Critics Organization

- 2000 Unsung Siren

Adult Video News

- 2001 Best Couples Sex Scene – Film, with Bobby Vitale for Facade
- 2001 Best All-Girl Sex Scene – Video, with Jewel De'Nyle for Dark Angels
- 2002 Best Actress – Video, for Euphoria
- 2003 Best Supporting Actress – Video, for Breathless
- 2007 AVN Hall of Fame

Adam Film World Guide

- 2003 Best Supporting Actress – Video (Breathless)

== Partial filmography ==
- Cougar School (2009)
- Pillow Talk (2004)
- Island Girls (2003)
- Sex Through the Ages (2002)
- My Father's Wife (2002)
- Snob Hill (2000)
- Nymphomercials (1999)
- V-World Matrix (1999)
- Blowjob Fantasies 2 (1998)
- Taboo 17 (1998)
- Dirty Dancers 12 (1997)
