= Aurora Snow =

American pornographic film actress and writer (born 1981/1982)

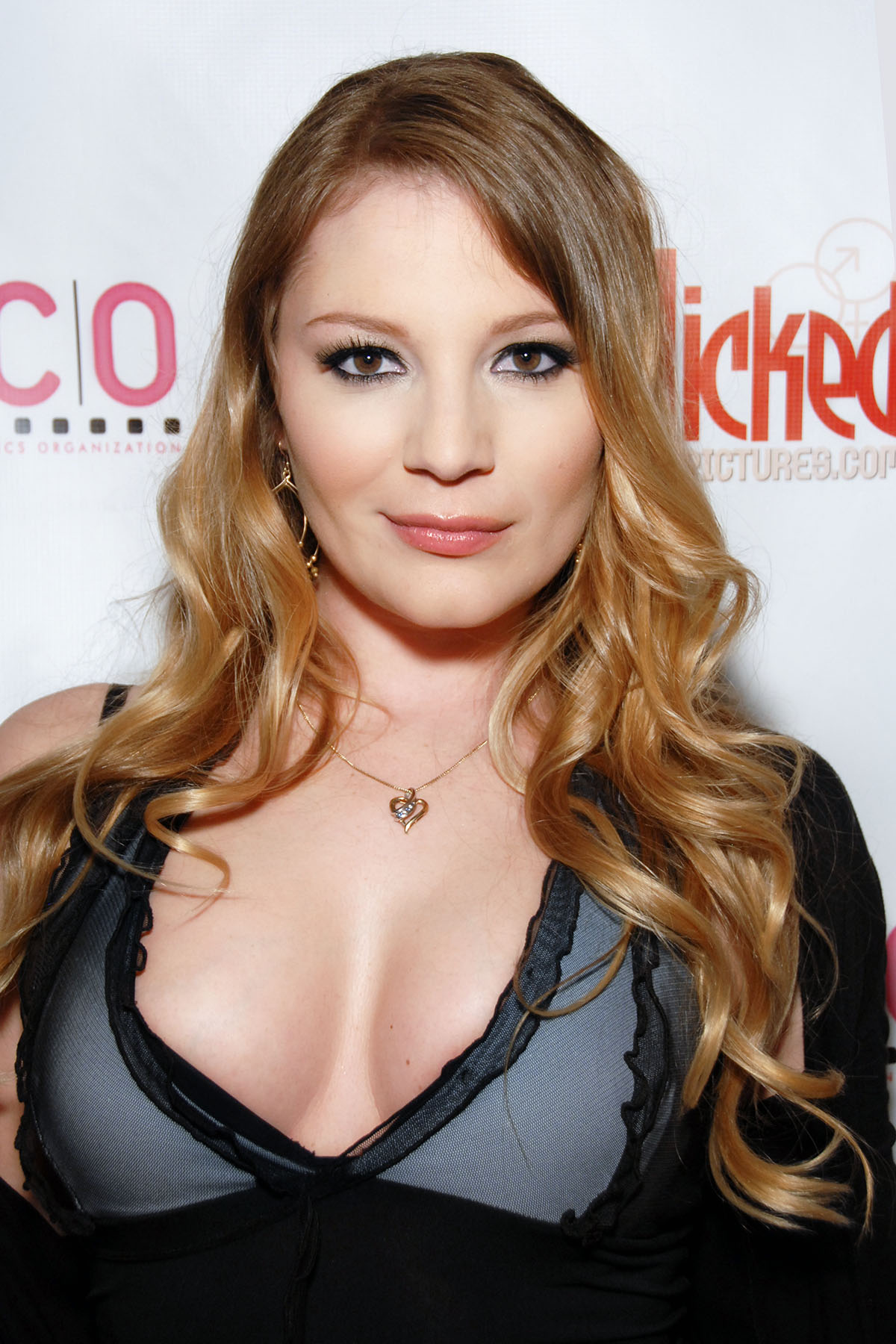
- Snow in 2011
- Born: 1981 or 1982 (age 44–45)
- Education: University of California, Irvine; Glendale Community College
- Occupations: Writer; director; pornographic film performer

Aurora Snow (born 1981 or 1982) is a retired American pornographic film actress, director, and columnist.

== Early life ==
Snow was raised by a single mother and was the oldest of three siblings.

== Career ==
=== Adult films ===
Snow joined the pornographic entertainment industry when she was 18 years old, planning to work in porn for only a year. One of her first professionally made and distributed movies was More Dirty Debutantes 152, produced by Ed Powers.

Snow was a contract performer and director for Sin City between May 2003 and May 2005. She made her directorial debut for the company with the film Assploitations. Snow has hosted programs for Playboy TV.

In July 2010, she reported on the obscenity case against John Stagliano for Adult Video News.

Despite not using condoms in most of her on-screen performances, she came out in favor of the 2012 Los Angeles ballot measure known as Measure B, which mandated the use of condoms for all pornographic movie scenes filmed in the county. She wrote on her website, "Safety isn't sexy, condoms aren't sexy, but they are safe." Snow left the pornographic film industry after ten years in 2011 and moved from Los Angeles to Macon, Missouri.

=== Mainstream media appearances ===
Snow appeared in the 2002 feature film The Rules of Attraction as Masked Naked Girl at Party.

Snow made a cameo appearance in the Judd Apatow film Superbad. On January 6, 2010, Snow appeared in an episode of 1000 Ways to Die titled "Death On Arrival" to discuss edible underwear during the "Way to Die #444: Deadliest Munch" segment of the episode.

Snow has been a contributor for The Daily Beast and Glammonitor, writing articles about the porn industry and women's issues. In 2013, Snow publicly criticized the adult film industry as racist, specifically for actively discouraging white female performers from engaging in actual or simulated sex with black men. Writing in The Daily Beast, Snow stated that such advice often comes from older white men in powerful positions within the industry.

On March 6, 2014, Snow spoke at Harvard Law School on the topic of "Sex, Drugs, and Rolling Dice: The Regulation of Vice." On March 19, 2015, Snow spoke at the University of South Carolina School of Law on "Vice, Porn and American Culture."

== Personal life ==
In 2004, Snow was engaged to fellow pornographic film actor Jay Ashley. In September 2013, Snow wrote an article for The Daily Beast titled "A Porn Star's Letter to Her Unborn Son" in which she announced she was pregnant with her first child and stated how she would explain her choice to work in the porn industry to her son once he is older. The letter quickly went viral on the Internet. She gave birth to her son in December 2013. Her father stated that he was proud upon finding out about her occupation.

== Awards ==
- 2003 XRCO Award – Best Threeway Sex Scene (for Trained Teens) with Gauge & Jules Jordan
- 2003 AVN Award – Female Performer of the Year
- 2011 XRCO Hall of Fame inductee
- 2017 AVN Hall of Fame inductee
