= Katie Morgan =

American pornographic film actress

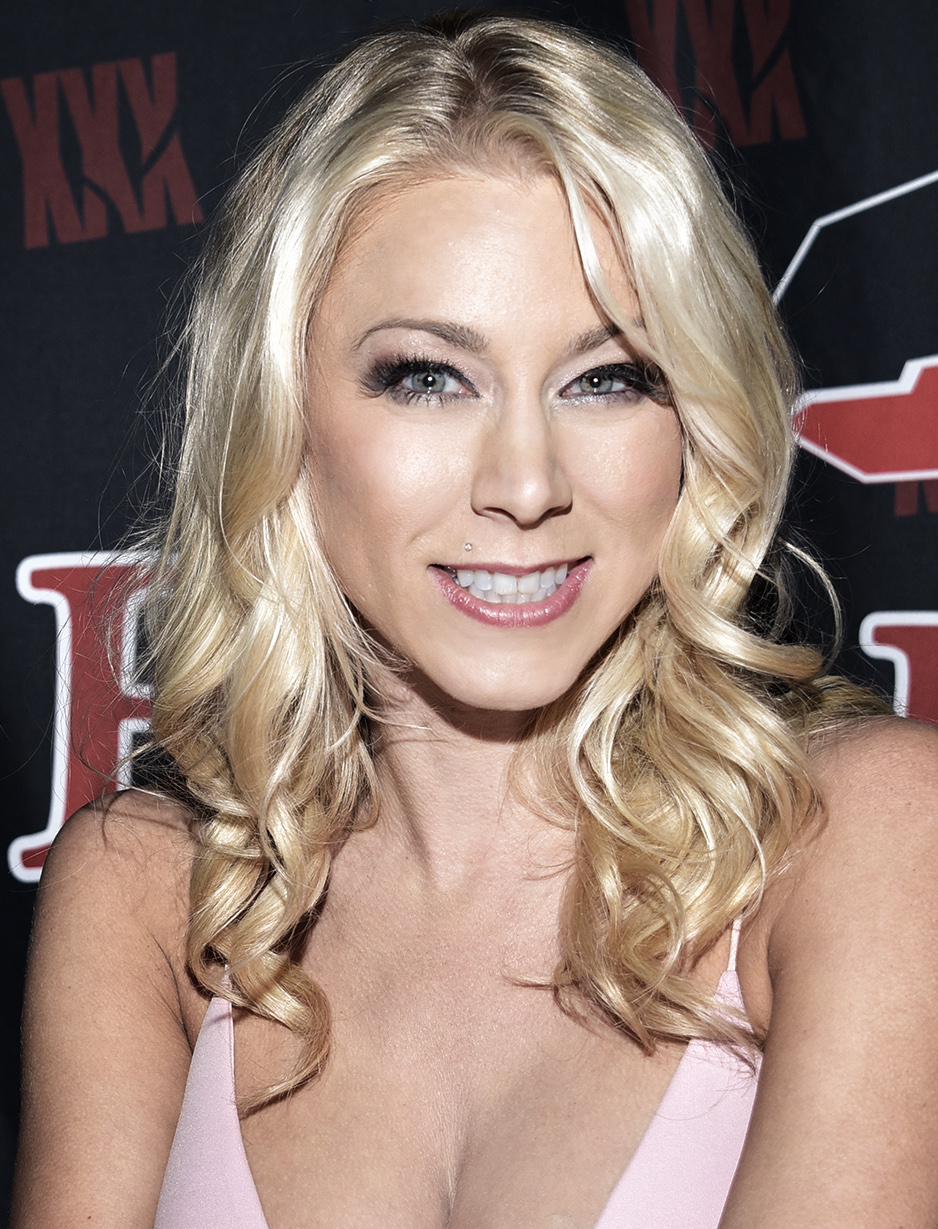
- Morgan in 2017
- Occupation: Pornographic film actress
- Spouses: Jim Jackman (m. 2009, divorced); Evan Stone (m. 2017, ended)

Katie Morgan is an American pornographic film actress.

== Career ==
Morgan initially entered the pornographic film industry by cold-calling a pornographic film actress known to a friend, who introduced her to an agent. In the HBO documentary film Katie Morgan: A Porn Star Revealed (2005), she describes having chosen the surname "Morgan" in reference to the alcoholic beverage Captain Morgan's Rum, and the first name "Katie" in reference to the real first name of the Scarlett O'Hara character in Gone with the Wind (1936).

She unofficially retired from adult films in 2008, and it was made official when she married a year later. In September 2015, she ended seven years of retirement by announcing her signing with Nexxxt Level Talent and began shooting productions in Los Angeles and Miami.

=== Appearances ===
Morgan has been featured on HBO's A Real Sex Xtra: Pornucopia – Going Down in the Valley, Katie Morgan on Sex Toys, Katie Morgan: Porn 101, and Katie Morgan's Sex Tips: Questions, Anyone?, some of which, she would host completely naked except for a pair of high heels.

In 2008, she made her first mainstream feature film appearance in Kevin Smith's comedy Zack and Miri Make a Porno. From 2011 to 2013, she hosted Having Sex, With Katie Morgan on Smith's SModcast Podcast Network.

== Awards ==
- 2005 XRCO Award – Unsung Siren
- 2009 AVN Award – Crossover Star of the Year
- 2009 Mr. Skin Anatomy Award – Best Porn Star Gone Hollywood (Zack and Miri Make a Porno)
- 2013 AVN Hall of Fame
- 2021 XRCO Hall of Fame

== Personal life ==
Morgan married Jim Jackman, whom she met on the set of Zack and Miri Make a Porno.
