= Sophia Locke =

American pornographic film actress

- Occupation: Pornographic film actress

Sophia Locke is an American pornographic film actress.

Locke began her career in 2010 and took a hiatus from 2016 until 2021. She has starred frequently in films about BDSM or other taboo topics.

== Career ==
Sophia Locke first started her pornographic career in 2010 on camming website LiveJasmin. Wearing a mask to hide her identity, she stated she was inspired by her first $150 to quit her job and enter the adult industry.

In 2015, Locke signed an exclusive deal with Cams.com.

In 2016, Locke began a five-year hiatus from the adult industry. According to her, this was due to her partner disapproving of the job. They moved to Seattle and she began working in real estate. After the couple separated, Locke opened an OnlyFans account, gradually re-entering the business.

In 2022, talking about her hiatus from the adult industry, Locke stated, "Some people have regrets about going into the adult industry...I regret ever leaving." In the same interview, she stated she had missed the connections within the adult industry and the ability to change public perceptions about pornography.

== Awards ==
Locke has been nominated for several awards, including 'Best MILF' in the 2023 Fleshbot Awards and for 'Favorite MILF' in the 2023 Pornhub Awards.

She was also nominated for the 2025 (for 'Best Sex Scene - All Girl') and 2026 XMA Awards, in the latter of which she won her first major award for 'MILF Performer of the Year' along with 'Best Sex Scene - Orgy/Group (Mixed)'.

== Personal life ==
Originally living in Las Vegas, Locke moved to Los Angeles to have better studio and production opportunities. She is a native of Long Beach, California. Locke has stated that, outside of the adult industry, her life is relatively peaceful.

She is currently managed by ATMLA after being with 101 Modeling for three years.
