= Dana DeArmond =

American pornographic film actress

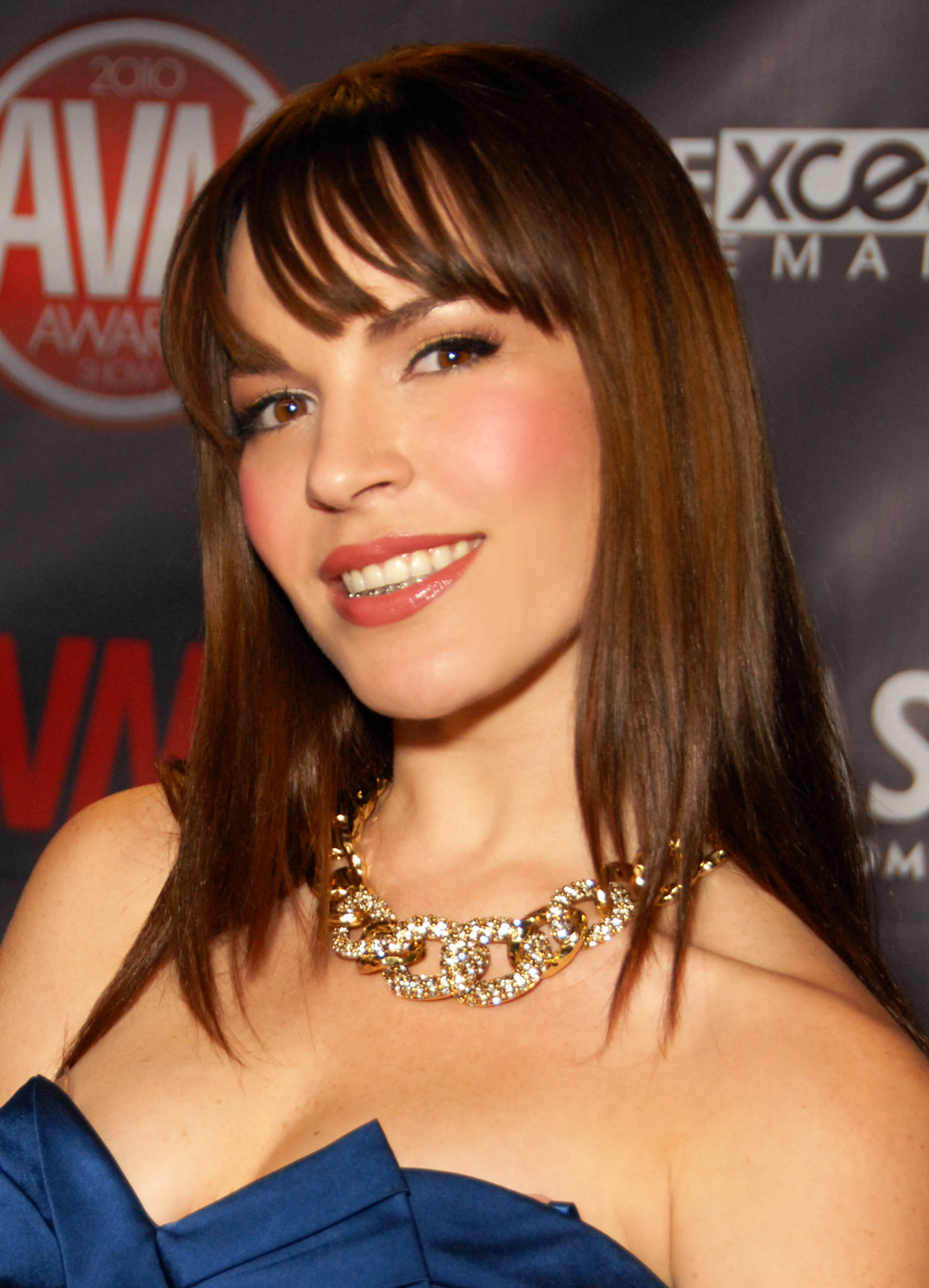
- DeArmond in 2010
- Occupations: Pornographic film actress; director
- Years active: 2004–present

Dana DeArmond is an American pornographic film actress and director. She joined the adult film industry in 2004 and is a member of the AVN, XRCO, and Urban X Halls of Fame.

== Early life and career ==
DeArmond grew up in Orlando, Florida. DeArmond had gained popularity before her porn career, as an internet personality with over 300,000 friends on Myspace. After meeting porn director Eon McKai on MySpace, she did her first scene for the film Neu Wave Hookers. DeArmond has hosted a show titled Dirty/Nerdy on Vivid Radio for SiriusXM.

DeArmond has directed two documentary porn movies in which she helps young people whom she meets on the web break into the business, called Dana DeArmond Does the Internet and Dana DeArmond's Role Modeling. She has also guest lectured on the adult industry for classes at University of California, Irvine and University of California, Santa Barbara.

=== Appearances ===
DeArmond was one of the models featured in Michael Grecco's photo book, Naked Ambition: An R Rated Look at an X Rated Industry and Dave Naz's book L.A. Bondage. After DeArmond's house and belongings were destroyed in a fire in January 2007, the adult industry participated in several fundraising activities to help replace what she lost. DeArmond co-hosted the 2010 Urban X Awards with porn actress Misty Stone.

In November 2007, DeArmond and her then-boyfriend, male performer Daniel, attended UC Irvine as guest lecturers for its Sociology of Sexuality class. She got the job through fellow performer Belladonna who lectured there previously. Following a lecture from Kassia Wosick-Correa, DeArmond spoke about her involvement in the adult film industry and the dynamics of her relationships. She also screened video clips and answered questions from the class.

In January 2014, DeArmond, Asa Akira, Chanel Preston, and Jessie Andrews were featured in a Cosmopolitan article titled "4 Porn Stars on How They Stay Fit". The article was inspired by actress Gabrielle Union's comment made on Conan O'Brien's talk show about striving to follow the fitness routines of the porn stars she saw at her gym.

In 2021, she was cast in the drama film Pleasure.

== Personal life ==
DeArmond admits to having social anxiety, stating, "I made my life so I don’t have to come into contact with lots of people except for once or twice a year when I sign." She dealt with her social anxiety by spending a lot of time on MySpace and an "Indie Rock" chat room on AOL. DeArmond identifies as a feminist.

In 2017, DeArmond accused T.J. Miller and Jordan Vogt-Roberts of sexual harassment on the set of Mash Up. She also alleged that Vogt-Roberts kissed her without her consent after having drinks with him after they wrapped work.

== Achievements ==
Year	Ceremony	Category	Film
2009	Urban X Award	Best Anal Sex Scene	Rico The Destroyer
2010	Urban X Award	Best Anal Sex Scene	Juicy White Anal Booty 4
2012	AVN Award	Best Girl/Girl Sex Scene	Belladonna: Sexual Explorer
2016	AVN Hall of Fame inductee	—N/a	
2021	Transgender Erotica Award	Best Non-TS Female Performer	—N/a
2022	XRCO Hall of Fame inductee	—N/a	
2023	Urban X Hall of Fame inductee	—N/a	
2024	Pornhub Award	Top MILF Performer	—N/a
