= AVN Media Network =

Adult entertainment company

AVN Media Network, Inc.
- Industry: Adult digital media
- Founded: 1982
- Key people: Paul Fishbein, Darren Roberts, Founders; Tony Rios, Chairman & CEO
- Products: Publishing, digital media and event management
- Number of employees: 50-100
- Website: avnmedianetwork.com

AVN Media Network is a publishing, digital media and event management company for the adult entertainment industry. AVN Media Network's portfolio of businesses includes several widely recognized adult industry publications, expos, shows, and communities. These include gfy.com, an adult webmaster community, AVN magazine, AVN Online, GAYVN and AVN Adult Entertainment Expo.

AVN Media Network, Inc. is headquartered in the Chatsworth, CA

== See also ==
- AVN Adult Entertainment Expo
- Pornography in the United States
