= Ana Foxxx =

American pornographic actress (born 1988/89)

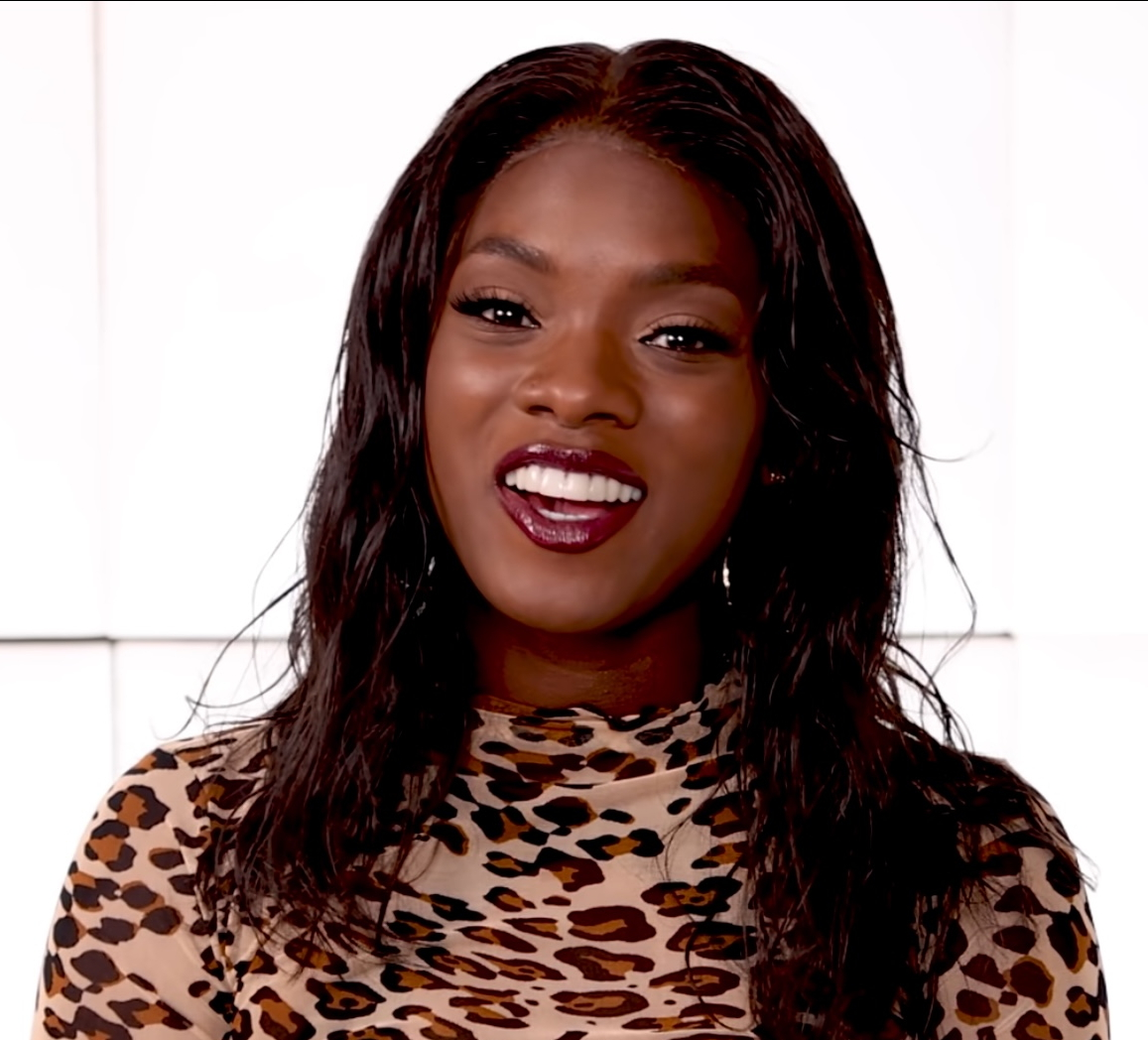
- Foxxx in 2021
- Born: 1988 or 1989 (age 36–37)
- Occupation: Pornographic film actress
- Years active: 2011–present

Ana Foxxx (born 1988 or 1989) is an American pornographic film actress. Having starred in hundreds of adult films, she has won multiple awards throughout her career. She began her career in 2011, and has been active in the industry ever since.

== Career ==
Foxxx was a part of Richardson's Valentine's Day Capsule in 2021.

She has been nominated for multiple AVN Awards in her career, and won the 2019 award for 'Best Group Sex Scene' and the 2024 award for 'Most Outrageous Sex Scene'. She also won several XBIZ Awards, the NightMoves Award for 'Best Actress', the Urban X Awards for 'Female Performer of the Year' and 'Pornstar of the Year', and was inducted into the Urban X Hall of Fame.

In 2015, Foxxx appeared in Sean Baker's comedy-drama film Tangerine.

=== Activism ===
Foxxx was openly critical against the adoption of California Proposition 60, which would require pornography performers in the state to wear condoms during filming.

Foxxx has been critical of racism in the adult film industry throughout her career. She stated that, in 2012, she was highly uncomfortable after being told to participate in a scene with a series of men who were wearing Confederate flags on their shirt. She stated she only participated in the scene due to financial pressures.

Foxxx's criticisms also included Exposed Models LA, who had allegedly sent an email stating that, as a part of Black History Month, they would be paying their talent at the lowest rate on interracial scenes. She stated, "It's disrespectful on so many levels. I don't wanna work with anyone who changes their rate to work with someone of a different race."

== Awards ==
- 2017 XBIZ Award – Best Sex Scene - Gonzo Release – Black Anal Asses
- 2018 XBIZ Award – Best Sex Scene - All-Sex Release – Axel Braun's Brown Sugar
- 2018 Urban X Award – Female Performer of the Year
- 2019 XCritic Award – Underrated Starlet
- 2019 AVN Award – Best Group Sex Scene – After Dark
- 2019 Spank Bank Award – Ebony Princess of the Year
- 2020 Spank Bank Award – America's Porn Sweetheart
- 2021 XBIZ Award – Best Sex Scene - All-Girl – Primary
- 2022 XBIZ Award – Best Sex Scene - All-Girl – Sweet Sweet Sally Mae
- 2022 XBIZ Award – Best Sex Scene - Virtual Reality – Wicked Wedding
- 2022 Urban X Hall of Fame
- 2022 Urban X Award – Pornstar of the Year
- 2023 NightMoves Award – Best Actress
- 2024 AVN Award – Most Outrageous Sex Scene – Raining Blood (Night of the Jizzed-In Dead)
- 2025 XMA Award – Best Sex Scene - All-Girl – Come Out to Play: An All-Girl Warriors Parody
- 2025 Bazowie Award – Fan Favorite Fandom Video – Come Out to Play: An All-Girl Warriors Parody
- 2026 XMA Award – Best Sex Scene - All-Girl – Come Out to Play: An All-Girl Warriors Parody
