= Julian Andretti =

American pornographic actor and director

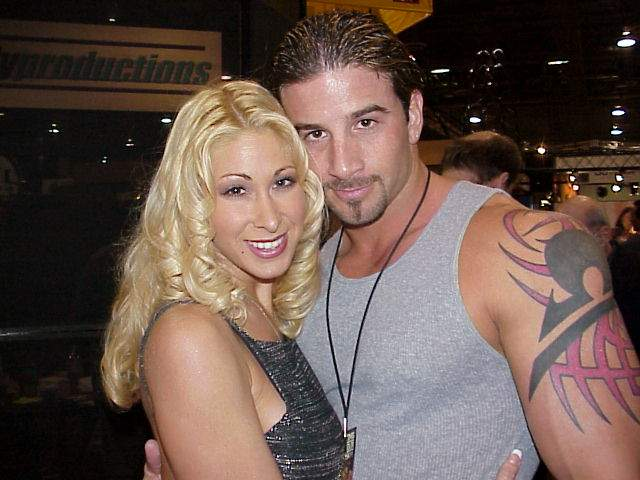
- Tiffany Mynx and Julian Andretti
- Born: Julián Ríos; October 12, 1970 (age 56); Santiago, Chile
- Other names: Jordan Rivers, Julian Andretti, Julián Ríos, Julien, Julio Rùiz, London Kane
- Occupations: Pornographic actor; director
- Years active: 1996–2013
- Height: 6 ft 2 in (1.88 m)
- Spouses: Jill Kelly (m. 2000; div. 2002) Lanny Barby (m. 2005; div. 2007)

Julián Ríos (born October 12, 1970), known professionally as Julian Andretti, is an American actor, producer, screenwriter and director of pornographic films.

== Early life ==
Andretti was born Julián Ríos. Most biographies and reference works state that Andretti was born on October 12, 1970, in Santiago, Chile, although some sources give his birthplace as West Covina, a small city west of California. Raised in a Latin American family of Lebanese descent, he is the second of six brothers and sisters. He grew up in West Covina in California, Everett and Seattle in Washington.

After graduating in 1988 from La Jolla High School in La Jolla, Andretti joined the United States Marine Corps, serving six years as a sergeant (1988-1994). He was a veteran of the Persian Gulf War. He also attended Pepperdine University in Malibu.

== Career ==
At age 25 Andretti entered adult cinema working as a personal trainer.

Under the stage name Jordan Rivers, he participated in several bisexual and gay films produced by Chi Chi LaRue, including Choke 'Em (1996) as Marines Intern and Bi Night Fly (1996) as Jordan.

After those first gay movies, he focused exclusively on straight scenes, starring in nearly 500 adult movies over 13 years, including a porn parody of the Sunny Patrol series - Babewatch 11 (2000).

In January 2000, his photos appeared in Playgirl magazine.

In 2001, he signed an exclusive contract with New Sensations and participated in the productions of Hearts & Minds, Innocence, Sweetwater and Naked Eye, as well as Naughty College Schoolgirls and Young As They Cum.

Andretti also had contracts with Vivid Entertainment, Metro Pictures, VCA Pictures and the Red Light District. He was seen, among others in the films: Hardcore Buffet No. 3 - Mercedez (2003), directed by Chi Chi LaRue, Art Of Anal 3 (2004) and Broken English (2004) with Monika Sweetheart and Nomi, Provocative Passion (2008 ) with Shy Love, and some films in which he did not participate in sexual scenes either: the movie Pirates (2005). He also appeared in the documentary Fluffy Cumsalot, Porn Star (2003).

Andretti has also appeared in Playgirl productions such as Provocative Passion (2006), Longing for Him (2006), Deep Indulgence (2006), and Always on Fire (2007).

In 2000, Andretti was nominated for the French Hot D'or Award for Best American Actor and the XRCO Award for Performer of the Year. In 2011 he won the survey of the Spanish portal 20minutos.es "The best pornographic actors".

== Personal life ==
On May 27, 2000, he married pornographic actress Jill Kelly and he resigned from acting to become a partner and COO of Jill Kelly Productions with his wife; they both stopped having sex with other people and wanted to start a family.

In previous years Andretti avoided talking about his beginnings in gay and bisexual porn, but more recently he talks openly about the subject when interviewed: "I think I did two bisexual movies, I never did gay. I did a handful of solo masturbation videos too and a handful of single layouts. It seems like every couple of years someone finds a reason to bring this up. I really did it for the money. They gave me ridiculous amounts of money with the hopes that I would do full gay movies".

When Andretti was asked if, at the time he did the movies, he was having bisexual tendencies or curious about gay sex in general: "Yes," he answered. "I know the experience now though. It's something that happened, I now know what it feels like, and after having tried it, I just know that it's not me".

He also said: "When people ask me about it directly, I'm not going to lie to them," says Julian. "It's not a topic of conversation I'm going to bring up, but I'm not going to lie about it either. The only time I lied about it was when I first signed with Metro and they asked if I'd done anything like that. I told them no and it just so happens that they had produced one of the movies so they already knew. I just wasn't proud of it, I didn't want them to know, and I didn't want it to affect my job".

Julian also said that he feels that homophobia is slightly rampant in the straight porn community, but claims people who deny their past or present in gay porn don't help that situation.

In 2002, he was featured on the television show Spice Hotel, on Friday, Saturday and Sunday nights on Spice Live, dedicated to porn star couples. He left the porn industry in 2005 and he turned to real estate and was replaced by Evan Stone.

On March 5, 2005, Andretti married Canadian porn star Lanny Barby and they divorced in 2007.

In 2006, with Derek Dozer, Andretti co-owned the porn company Twisted Pink and changed their name to Sudden Impact after founder Lola moved to Naughty America.

Andretti worked for Vivid Video, VCA Pictures, Metro Pictures, Vivid Entertainment, New Sensations, Twisted Pink Video, and Pistol Whip Media / Sudden Impact Video. He was also associated with Memphis Monroe (2008).

== Testimonials about his profession ==
When I was in high school, I watched porn. And now the people I watched then, Nina Hartley, Peter North, Marilyn Chambers, I know these people. My mom says, "My son is a porn star." I didn't lie to them [family]. If I was ashamed of what I did, I would've done something else.

My family supports me. My grandparents joke about it. I was home in Seattle at Christmas. Grandpa says, "We've been to every adult store in town and we can't find your movies. Give us some of the titles?" I said no. My mom, her friends, my sister joke with me.

== Awards and nominations ==
- 2000 Hot d'Or nominated - Best American Actor
