= XRCO Awards =

Adult entertainment industry award

XRCO Award
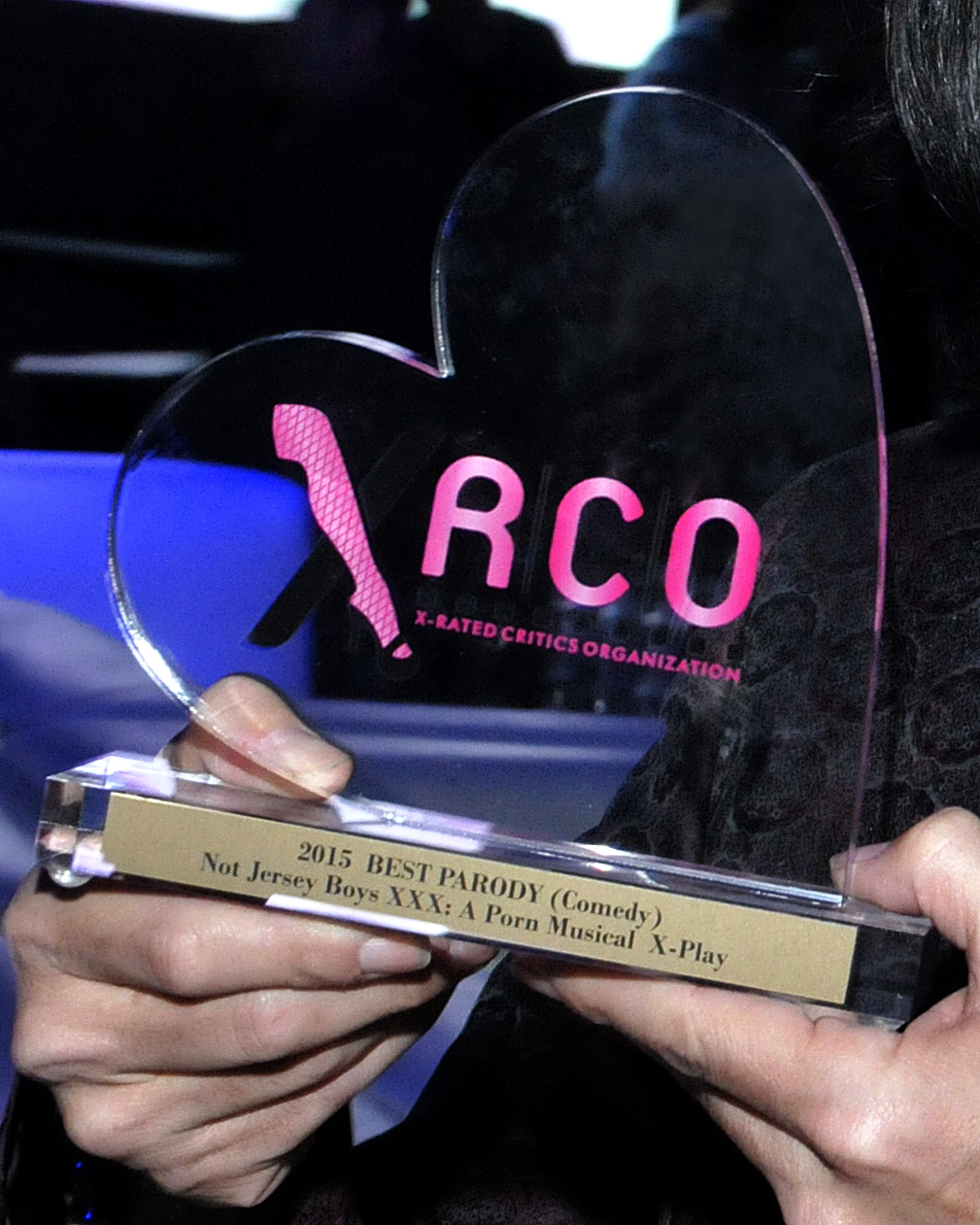
- New trophy introduced in 2015 retains the original heart shape, but it is now clear and has a base
- Sponsored by: X-Rated Critics Organization
- Date: February 14, 1985; 41 years ago
- Location: Los Angeles, California, U.S.
- Country: United States
- Reward: Trophy
- Website: dirtybob.com/xrco/winners.htm

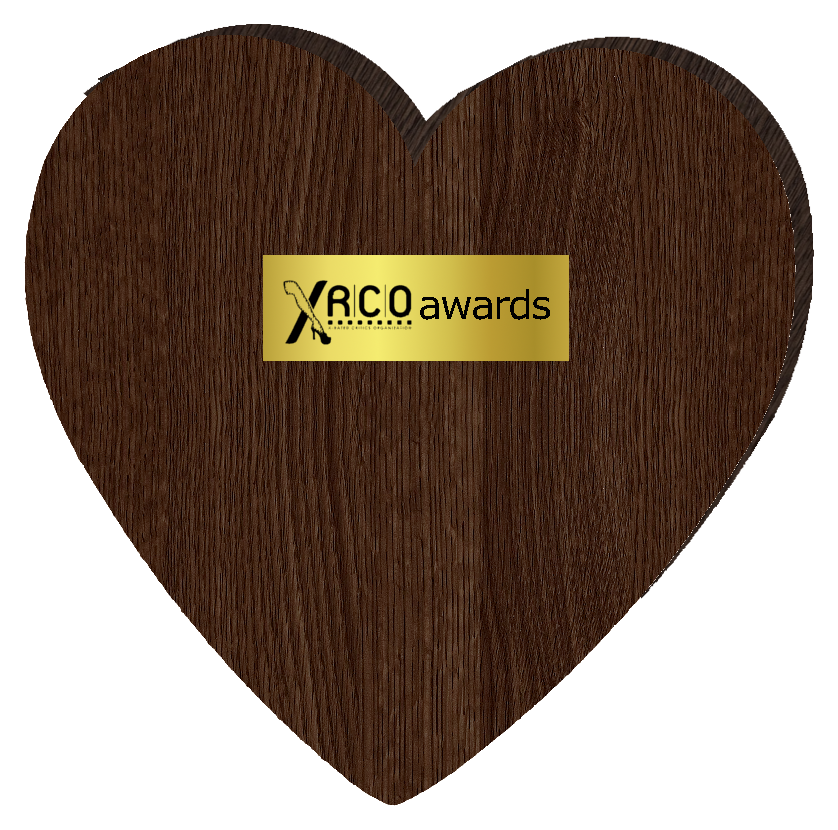
Original award plaques were made of wood in the shape of a heart and used until 2014

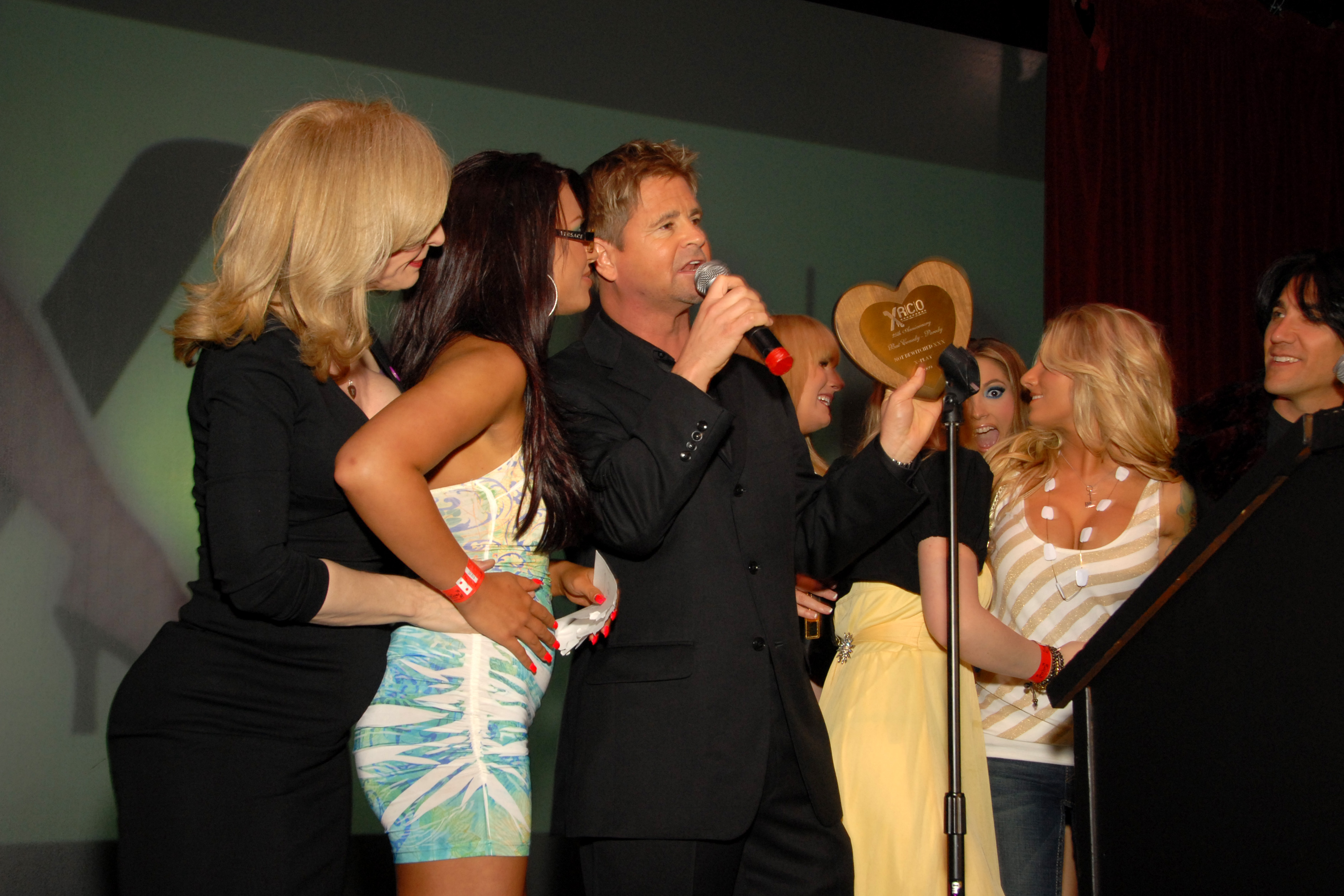
Cast and crew of the feature Not Bewitched on stage during the 25th Anniversary XRCO Awards at The Highlands, Hollywood, CA on April 17, 2009 (from left to right: Nina Hartley, Eva Angelina, Will Ryder, Flower Tucci, Sunny Lane, who is back to camera in yellow dress, Jenna Haze, Teagan Presley and producer Scott David)

The XRCO Awards were given by the American X-Rated Critics Organization annually to people working in adult entertainment and was the only adult industry awards show reserved exclusively for industry members.

Once every calendar year, XRCO members were asked to submit their own nominations. Members did not have to vote in every award category, and were asked only to vote in areas that they feel qualified in. The award ceremony usually took place during the spring and no later than the first week of April. Some of the works and workers were inducted into the XRCO Hall of Fame during the awards.

The XRCO online archive is missing many results prior to 1993 and the site encourages visitors to send in older results. The awards have been called "an X-rated version of the Academy Awards" and "a combination high-school beer bash, Mardi gras and Frederick's of Hollywood lingerie show". They have also been referred to as the "critics' circle awards for porn".

== History ==
After the controversy and criticism of the best erotic scene victory for the movie Virginia in 1984 at the Adult Film Association of America (AFAA) awards, the X-Rated Critics Organization (XRCO) and its "Heart-On Awards", were founded. Jim Holliday was a founder and previously the honorary historian of the X-Rated Critics Organization. After Holliday's death, the position of XRCO Historian was temporarily filled by XRCO founding member Bill Margold until 2006.

The first XRCO Awards were presented on February 14, 1985, where Ginger Lynn won a "veritable Triple Crown: 'Best Female Performer', 'Video Vixen' and 'Starlet of the Year'". Until 1991, the awards were presented on Valentine's Day each year. The specific award categories at the XRCO Awards have changed over the years.

In March 2015, changes to the award program were announced. Citing the venue and date changes made in 2014, the event organizers announced that the awards show would be recorded and broadcast by the company Vrai Voyeur. Also announced was the debut of a new design for the award handed out to winners. The "iconic wooden heart on trophies" would be retired and be replaced with "something bigger and better than ever".

== All in the Family Theme ==
- 2016: The Father Figure (Digital Sin/Tabu Tales)
- 2017: Me, My Brother and Another (New Sensations)
- 2018: Dysfucktional: Blood Is Thicker Than Cum (Kelly Madison/Juicy)
- 2019: A Trailer Park Taboo (Pure Taboo/Pulse)
- 2020: My Stepson Is Evil (Evil Angel Films)

== Best 3D Release ==
- 2012: This Ain't Ghostbusters XXX (Hustler Video)

== Best Actor (Single Performance) ==
- 1985: Eric Edwards (Great Sexpectations)
- 1986: Jerry Butler (Snake Eyes)
- 1987: John Leslie (Every Woman Has a Fantasy 2)
- 1988: Jamie Gillis (Deep Throat II)
- 1994: Jon Dough (New Wave Hookers 3)
- 1995: Steven St. Croix (Dog Walker)
- 1996: Jon Dough (Latex)
- 1997: Tom Byron (Flesh)
- 1998: Tom Byron (Indigo Delta)
- 1999: James Bonn (Masseuse 3)
- 2000: Randy Spears (Double Feature)
- 2001: Joel Lawrence (Raw)
- 2002: Evan Stone (Cap'n Mongo's Porno Playhouse)
- 2003: Rocco Siffredi (The Fashionistas)
- 2004: Randy Spears (Space Nuts – Wicked Pictures)
- 2005: Randy Spears (Misty Beethoven The Musical – VCA Pictures)
- 2006: Randy Spears (Eternity – Wicked Pictures)
- 2007: Randy Spears (Curse Eternal – Wicked Pictures)
- 2008: Randy Spears (Black Widow – Wicked Pictures)
- 2009: Evan Stone (Pirates II: Stagnetti's Revenge – Digital Playground)
- 2010: Eric Swiss (Not Married with Children XXX – X-Play/LFP Video)
- 2011: Evan Stone
- 2012: Anthony Rosano
- 2013: Steven St. Croix (Torn – New Sensations Couples)
- 2014: Richie Calhoun (The Submission of Emma Marx – New Sensations)
- 2015: Steven St. Croix (Wetwork – Vivid)
- 2016: Derrick Pierce (Magic Mike XXXL: A Hardcore Parody – Wicked Pictures)
- 2017: Tommy Pistol (Suicide Squad XXX: An Axel Braun Parody – Wicked Comix)
- 2018: Tommy Pistol (Ingenue - Wicked Pictures)
- 2019: Tommy Pistol (Anne: A Taboo Parody - Pure Taboo/Pulse)
- 2020: Seth Gamble (Perspective - Adult Time/Pulse)

== Best Actress (Single Performance) ==
- 1985: Rachel Ashley (Every Woman Has a Fantasy)
- 1986: Gloria Leonard (Taboo American Style (The Miniseries))
- 1987: Colleen Brennan (Getting Personal)
- 1988: Krista Lane (Deep Throat II)
- 1989: Ariel Knight (Romeo And Juliet II)
- 1990: Sharon Kane (Bodies In Heat 2)
- 1991: Jeanna Fine (Steal Breeze)
- 1992: Jeanna Fine (Brandy And Alexander)
- 1993: Ashlyn Gere (Chameleons Not The Sequel)
- 1994: Leena (Blinded by Love)
- 1995: Tyffany Million (Sex)
- 1996: Jeanna Fine (Skin Hunger)
- 1997: Jeanna Fine (My Surrender)
- 1998: Dyanna Lauren (Bad Wives)
- 1999: Jeanna Fine (Café Flesh 2)
- 2000: Inari Vachs (The Awakening)
- 2001: Taylor Hayes (Jekyll & Hyde)
- 2002: Taylor Hayes (Fade to Black)
- 2003: Belladonna (The Fashionistas)
- 2004: Ashley Long (Compulsion – Elegant Angel)
- 2005: Jessica Drake (Fluff And Fold – Wicked Pictures)
- 2006: Savanna Samson (The New Devil in Miss Jones – Vivid)
- 2007: Hillary Scott (Corruption – Sex Z Pictures)
- 2008: Eva Angelina (Upload – Sex Z Pictures)
- 2009: Jessica Drake (Fallen – Wicked Pictures)
- 2010: Kimberly Kane (The Sex Files: A Dark XXX Parody – Revolution X/Digital Sin)
- 2011: Kimberly Kane
- 2012: Jessie Andrews
- 2013: Lily Carter (Wasteland – Elegant Angel Productions)
- 2014: Remy LaCroix (The Temptation of Eve – New Sensations Erotic Stories)
- 2015: Penny Pax (Wetwork – Vivid)
- 2016: Penny Pax (The Submission of Emma Marx: Boundaries – New Sensations Erotic Stories)
- 2017: Kleio Valentien (Suicide Squad XXX: An Axel Braun Parody – Wicked Comix)
- 2018: Jill Kassidy (Half His Age: A Teenage Tragedy - Pure Taboo/Pulse)
- 2019: Avi Love (The Possession of Mrs. Hyde - Wicked)
- 2020: Angela White (Perspective - Adult Time/Pulse)
- 2021: Maitland Ward (Muse - Deeper/Pulse)
- 2022: Maitland Ward (Muse 2 - Deeper/Pulse)
- 2023: Maitland Ward (Drift - Deeper/Pulse)
- 2024: Kira Noir (Machine Gunner - Digital Playground)
- 2025: Casey Calvert (Birth - Adult Time/Pulse)
- 2026: Lilly Bell (The Secrets We Share)

== Best Adult Web Site ==
- 2019: EvilAngel
- 2020: Adult Time

== Best Amateur or Pro-Am Series ==
- 1994: Randy West's Up and Cummers
- 1995: Anal Adventures of Max Hardcore
- 1996: Max
- 1997: Cumback Pussy
- 1998: Filthy First-Timers
- 1999: Real Sex Magazine
- 2000: Real Sex Magazine
- 2001: Up and Cummers
- 2002: Up and Cummers
- 2003: Shane's World
- 2004: Breakin' 'Em In (Red Light District)
- 2005: Breakin' 'Em In (Red Light District)
- 2006: New Whores 2 (Mayhem)

== Best Anal or D.P. Sex Scene ==
- 1994: (Arabian Nights)
  - Julian St. Jox
  - Porsche Lynn
  - Sean Michaels
- 1995: (Butt Banged Bicycle Babes)
  - Kim Chambers
  - Mark Davis
  - Yvonne
  - John Stagliano
- 1996: (Bottom Dweller 33 1/3)
  - Careena Collins
  - Jake Steed
- 1997: (Car Wash Angels)
  - Careena Collins
  - T. T. Boy
  - Tom Byron
- 1998: (Behind the Sphinc Door)
  - Alisha Klass
  - Tom Byron
- 1999: (Tushy Heaven)
  - Alisha Klass
  - Samantha Stylle
  - Sean Michaels
- 2000: (When Rocco Meats Kelly 2)
  - Alba de Monte
  - Kelly
  - Nacho Vidal
  - Rocco Siffredi

== Best Anal Series ==
- 2019: Anal Beauty (Tushy)
- 2020: Anal Models (Tushy/Pulse)

== Best Comedy or Parody ==
=== 2004–2010 ===
- 2004: Space Nuts (Wicked Pictures)
- 2005: Misty Beethoven The Musical (VCA Pictures)
- 2006: Camp Cuddly Pines Powertool Massacre (Wicked Pictures)
- 2007: Britney Rears 3 (X-Play/Hustler Video)
- 2008: Not the Bradys XXX (X-Play/Hustler)
- 2009: Ashlynn Goes to College 2 (New Sensations) – non-parody
- 2009: Not Bewitched XXX (X-Play) – parody
- 2010: Not Married with Children XXX (X-Play/LFP Video)

=== 2011–2016 ===
==== Comedy ====
- 2011: The Big Lebowski: A XXX Parody (New Sensations)
- 2012: The Rocki Whore Picture Show: A Hardcore Parody (Wicked Pictures)
- 2013: Star Wars XXX: A Porn Parody (Axel Braun/Vivid)
- 2014: Grease XXX: A Parod (Adam & Eve Pictures)
- 2015: Not Jersey Boys XXX: A Porn Musical (X-Play/Pulse)
- 2016: Peter Pan XXX: An Axel Braun Parody (Wicked Fairy Tales)

==== Drama ====
- 2011: The Sex Files 2: A Dark XXX Parody (Revolution X/Digital Sin)
- 2012: Taxi Driver: A XXX Parody (Pleasure Dynasty/Exile)
- 2013 (tie): Dallas XXX: A Parody (Adam & Eve Pictures) and Diary of Love (Smash Pictures)
- 2014: OMG ... It's the Leaving Las Vegas XXX Parody (Septo/Paradox/Exquisite)
- 2015: Cinderella XXX: An Axel Braun Parody (Wicked Fairy Tales)
- 2016: Magic Mike XXXL: A Hardcore Parody (Wicked Pictures)

==== Comic ====
- 2012: Spider-Man XXX: A Porn Parody (Vivid Entertainment Group)
- 2013: Superman vs. Spider-Man XXX: An Axel Braun Parody (VividXXXSuperheroes)
- 2014: Man of Steel XXX: An Axel Braun Parody (VividXXXSuperheroes)
- 2015 (tie): Barbarella XXX: A Kinky Parody (Kink.com/Jules Jordan) and The Doctor Whore Porn Parody (Wood Rocket/Digital Sin)
- 2016: Batman v. Superman XXX: An Axel Braun Parody (Wicked Pictures)

=== 2017–present ===
==== Comedy ====
- 2017: Cindy Queen of Hell (Burning Angel/Exile)
- 2018: Bad Babes Inc. (Adam & Eve Pictures)
- 2019: Love in the Digital Age (New Sensations Romance)
- 2020: Love Emergency (Adam & Eve Pictures)

==== Parody ====
- 2017: Suicide Squad XXX: An Axel Braun Parody (Wicked Comix)
- 2018: Justice League XXX: An Axel Braun Parody (Wicked Comix)
- 2019: Deadpool XXX: An Axel Braun Parody (Wicked Comix)
- 2020: Captain Marvel XXX: An Axel Braun Parody (Wicked Comix)

== Best Cumback ==
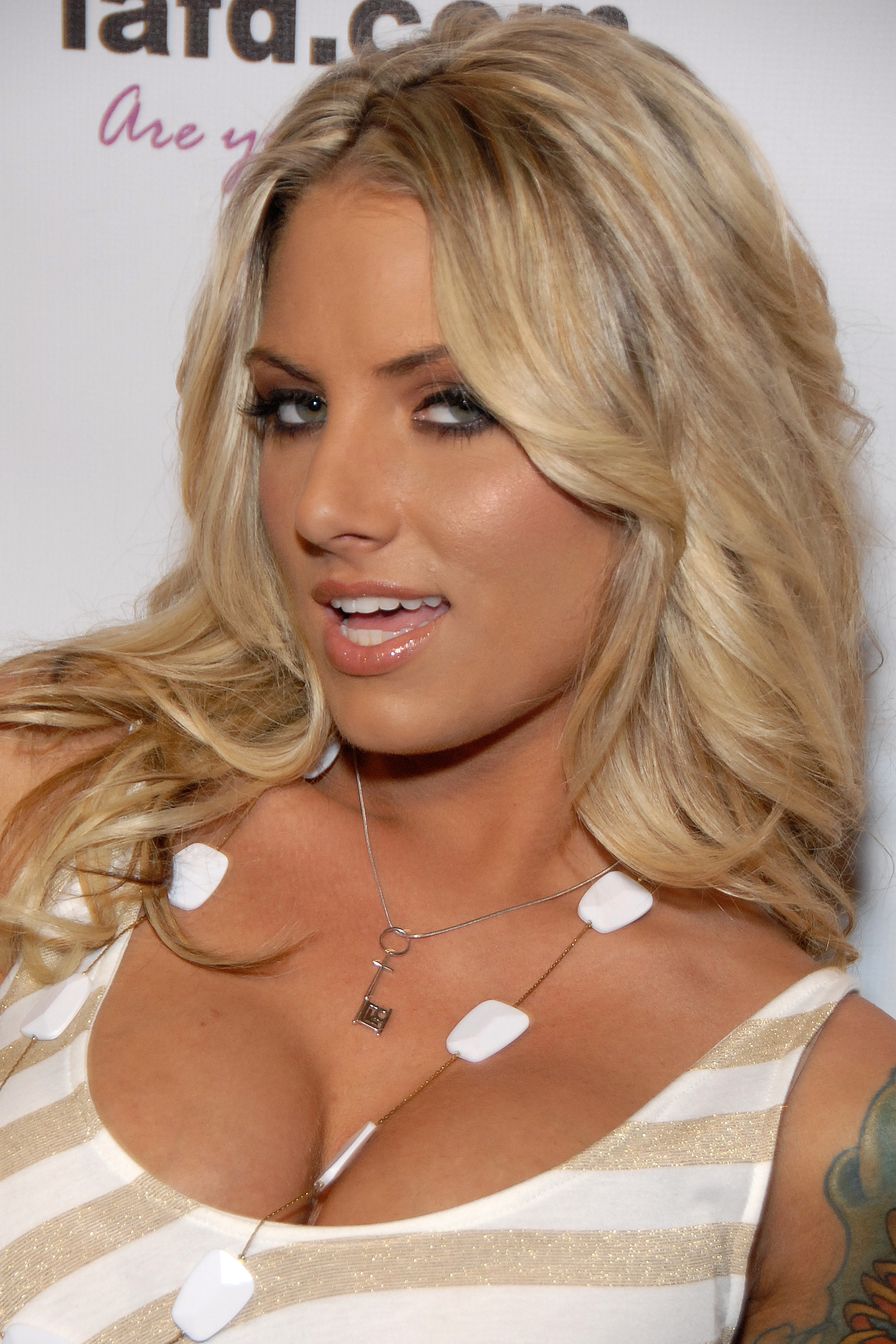
Teagan Presley at 2009 XRCO Award Show

- 2007: Lisa Ann
- 2008: Kaylani Lei
- 2009: Teagan Presley
- 2010: Eva Angelina
- 2011: Dale DaBone
- 2012: Prince Yahshua
- 2013: Steven St. Croix
- 2014: Sunny Lane
- 2015: Ryder Skye
- 2016: Ryan Conner
- 2017: Briana Banks
- 2018: Tori Black

== Best Director ==
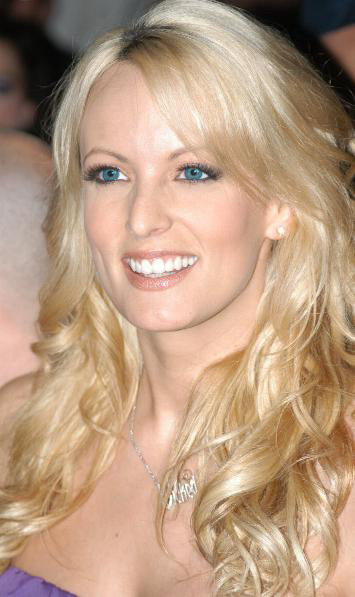
Stormy Daniels at 2007 XRCO Award Show

- 1988: John Leslie
- 1994: Paul Thomas
- 1995: John Leslie
- 1996: Michael Ninn
- 1997: Gregory Dark
- 1998: John Leslie
- 1999: John Leslie
- 2000: Paul Thomas
- 2001: Michael Raven
- 2002: Jules Jordan
- 2003: John Stagliano
- 2004: Jules Jordan
- 2005: Jules Jordan
- 2006: Joone

=== Features ===
- 2007: Brad Armstrong
- 2008: (tie) Brad Armstrong and Stormy Daniels
- 2009: Brad Armstrong
- 2010: Will Ryder
- 2011: Brad Armstrong
- 2012: Graham Travis
- 2013: Graham Travis
- 2014: Jacky St. James
- 2015: Jacky St. James
- 2016: Jacky St. James
- 2017: Brad Armstrong
- 2018: Bree Mills
- 2019: Kayden Kross
- 2020: Kayden Kross

=== Non-Features ===
- 2007: Jules Jordan
- 2008: Jules Jordan
- 2009: Jules Jordan
- 2010: William H.
- 2011: William H.
- 2012: William H.
- 2013: William H.
- 2014: Mason
- 2015: Mason
- 2016: Greg Lansky
- 2017: Greg Lansky
- 2018: Greg Lansky
- 2019: Jonni Darkko
- 2020: Jules Jordan

=== Parody ===
- 2011: Axel Braun
- 2012: Axel Braun
- 2013: Axel Braun
- 2014: Will Ryder
- 2015: Axel Braun
- 2016: Axel Braun
- 2017: Axel Braun
- 2018: Axel Braun
- 2019: Axel Braun
- 2020: Joanna Angel

=== Web ===
- 2014: Greg Lansky
- 2015: Greg Lansky
- 2016: Stills By Alan
- 2017: Stills by Alan
- 2018: (tie) Maestro Claudio & Ivan
- 2019: Ivan
- 2020: Kayden Kross

== Best DVD Extras ==
- 2006: Camp Cuddly Pines Powertool Massacre

== Best Ethnic/Interracial/Blended Series ==
- 2010: Big Black Wet Asses (Elegant Angel)
- 2011: Asian Fucking Nation (Darkko Productions/Evil Angel)
- 2012: Lex the Impaler (Jules Jordan Video)
- 2013: Mandingo Massacre (Jules Jordan Video)
- 2015: My First Interracial (Blacked/Jules Jordan)
- 2016: My First Interracial (Blacked/Jules Jordan)
- 2017: Black & White (Blacked/Jules Jordan)
- 2018: Interracial Icon (Blacked/Jules Jordan)
- 2019: Blacked Raw (Blacked Raw)
- 2020: Blacked Raw (Blacked Raw/Pulse)

== Best: Girl-Girl Sex Scene ==
- 1985: (Body Girls)
  - Erica Boyer
  - Robin Everett
- 1986: (Pleasure Island)
  - 5 Woman orgy
- 1994: (Hidden Obsessions)
  - Janine
  - Julia Ann
- 1995: (The Dinner Party)
  - Celeste
  - Debi Diamond
  - Misty Rain
- 1996: (Takin' It To The Limit 6)
  - Careena Collins
  - Felecia
  - Jill Kelly
  - Misty Rain
  - Traci Allen
- 1997: (Beyond Reality 1)
  - Careena Collins
  - Felecia
- 1998: (Miscreants)
  - Jeanna Fine
  - Stephanie Swift
  - Tiffany Mynx
- 1999: (Tampa Tushy Fest 1)
  - Alisha Klass
  - Chloe
- 2000: (Torn)
  - Chloe
  - Ginger Lynn
- 2001: (Les Vampires)
  - Ava Vincent
  - Syren
- 2002: (No Man's Land 33)
  - Inari Vachs
  - Jewel De'Nyle
- 2003: (The Fashionistas)
  - Belladonna
  - Taylor St. Claire
- 2004: (My Plaything – Jenna Jameson 2 - Digital Sin)
  - Carmen Luvana
  - Jenna Jameson
- 2005: (The Violation of Audrey Hollander - JM Productions)
  - Ashley Blue
  - Audrey Hollander
  - Brodi
  - Gia Paloma
  - Kelly Kline
  - Tyla Wynn

Note: A "Best Girl-Girl Release" category was created in 2005. No "Best Girl-Girl Scene" awards have been given out since.

== Best Girl-Girl Release or Series ==
- 2006: Belladonna's Fucking Girls (Belladonna/Evil Angel)
- 2007: Belladonna: No Warning 2 (Belladonna Productions/Evil Empire)
- 2008: Belladonna's Fucking Girls 4 (Belladonna/Evil Angel)
- 2009: Belladonna’s Girl Train (Belladonna Entertainment)
- 2010: Women Seeking Women (Girlfriends Films)
- 2011: Women Seeking Women (Girlfriends Films)
- 2012: Women Seeking Women (Girlfriends Films)
- 2013: Women Seeking Women (Girlfriends Films)
- 2014: Women Seeking Women (Girlfriends Films)
- 2015: Women Seeking Women (Girlfriends Films)
- 2016: Women Seeking Women (Girlfriends Films)
- 2017: Angela Loves Women (AGW/Girlfriends Films)
- 2018: Women Seeking Women (Girlfriends Films)
- 2019: Angela Loves Women (AGW/Girlfriends Films)
- 2020: Angela Loves Women (AGW/Girlfriends Films)

== Best Gonzo Release ==
- 2006: Slut Puppies (Jules Jordan/Evil Angel)
- 2007: Jenna Haze Darkside (Jules Jordan Video)
- 2008: Flesh Hunter 10 (Jules Jordan Video)
- 2009: Alexis Texas Is Buttwoman (Elegant Angel)
- 2010: Big Wet Asses 15 (Elegant Angel)
- 2011: Tori Black Is Pretty Filthy 2 (Elegant Angel)
- 2012: Asa Akira Is Insatiable 2 (Elegant Angel)
- 2013: Asa Akira Is Insatiable 3 (Elegant Angel Productions)
- 2014: Remy LaCroix's Anal Cabo Weekend (LeWood/Buttman/Evil Angel)
- 2015: V for Vicki (Jonni Darkko/Evil Angel)
- 2016: Angela 2 (AGW Entertainment/Girlfriends Films) and Anikka's Anal Sluts (BAM Visions/Evil Angel)
- 2017: Natural Beauties (Vixen/Jules Jordan)
- 2018: Angela 3 (AGW Entertainment/Girlfriends Films)
- 2019: Angela Loves Anal 2 (AGW/Girlfriends Films)
- 2020: Angela White: Darkside (Jules Jordan Video)

== Best Gonzo Series ==
- 1997: Shane's World
- 1999: Whack Attack
- 2000: Please
- 2001: Please!
- 2002: Service Animals
- 2003: Flesh Hunter
- 2004: Flesh Hunter
- 2005: Service Animals (Joey Silvera/Evil Angel)
- 2006: Service Animals (Joey Silvera/Evil Angel)
- 2007: Joey Silvera's Service Animals (All Blew Shirts/Evil Empire)
- 2008: Ass Worship (Jules Jordan Video)
- 2009: Big Wet Asses (Elegant Angel)
- 2010: Seasoned Players (Tom Byron Pictures/Evolution Distribution)
- 2011: Big Wet Asses (Elegant Angel)
- 2012: Big Wet Asses (Elegant Angel)
- 2013: Raw (Manuel Ferrara/Evil Angel)
- 2014: Wet Asses (Jules Jordan Video)
- 2015: DP Me (Hard X/O.L. Entertainment)
- 2016: Anal Beauty (Tushy/Jules Jordan Video) and Gangbang Me (Hard X)
- 2017: Angela Loves (AGW/Girlfriends Films)
- 2018: Angela Loves (AGW/Girlfriends Films)
- 2019: DP Me (Hard X/O.L. Entertainment)
- 2020: Raw (Manuel Ferrara/Jules Jordan)

== Best Group Sex Scene ==
- 1985: (Stud Hunters)
  - Pippi Anderssen
  - 5 other male performers
- 1986: (New Wave Hookers)
  - Ginger Lynn
  - Steve Powers
  - Tom Byron
- 1994: Slave to Love
  - orgy
- 1995: (Friday Night Delights)
  - Britney Loara
  - Lexington Steele
  - John E. Depth
  - Mr. Marcus
- 1996: (New Wave Hookers 4)
  - The staircase orgy
- 1997: (American Tushy)
  - Alex Sanders
  - Hakan
  - Missy
  - Taren Steele
- 1998: (The Psychosexuals)
  - Chloe
  - Mickey G.
  - Missy
  - Ruby
- 1999: (Asswoman In Wonderland)
  - Iroc
  - Luciano
  - Stryc-9
  - Tiffany Mynx
- 2000: (Tristan Taormino's Ultimate Guide to Anal Sex)
  - Final Orgy
- 2001: (In the Days of Whore)
  - Kristi Myst
  - other gang bang participants
- 2002: (Gangbang Auditions 7)
  - Aurora Snow
  - Five men
- 2003: (The Fashionistas)
  - Friday
  - Rocco Siffredi
  - Sharon Wild
  - Taylor St. Claire
- 2004: (Flesh Hunter 5 – Evil Angel)
  - Arnold Schwarzenpecker
  - John Strong
  - Mark Wood
  - Taylor Rain
  - Trent Tesoro
- 2005: (Baker’s Dozen 2 – Brandon Iron Productions/Platinum X Pictures)
  - Julie Night
  - Kami Andrews
  - Missy Monroe
  - Others

== Best Male-Female (Couples) Sex Scene ==
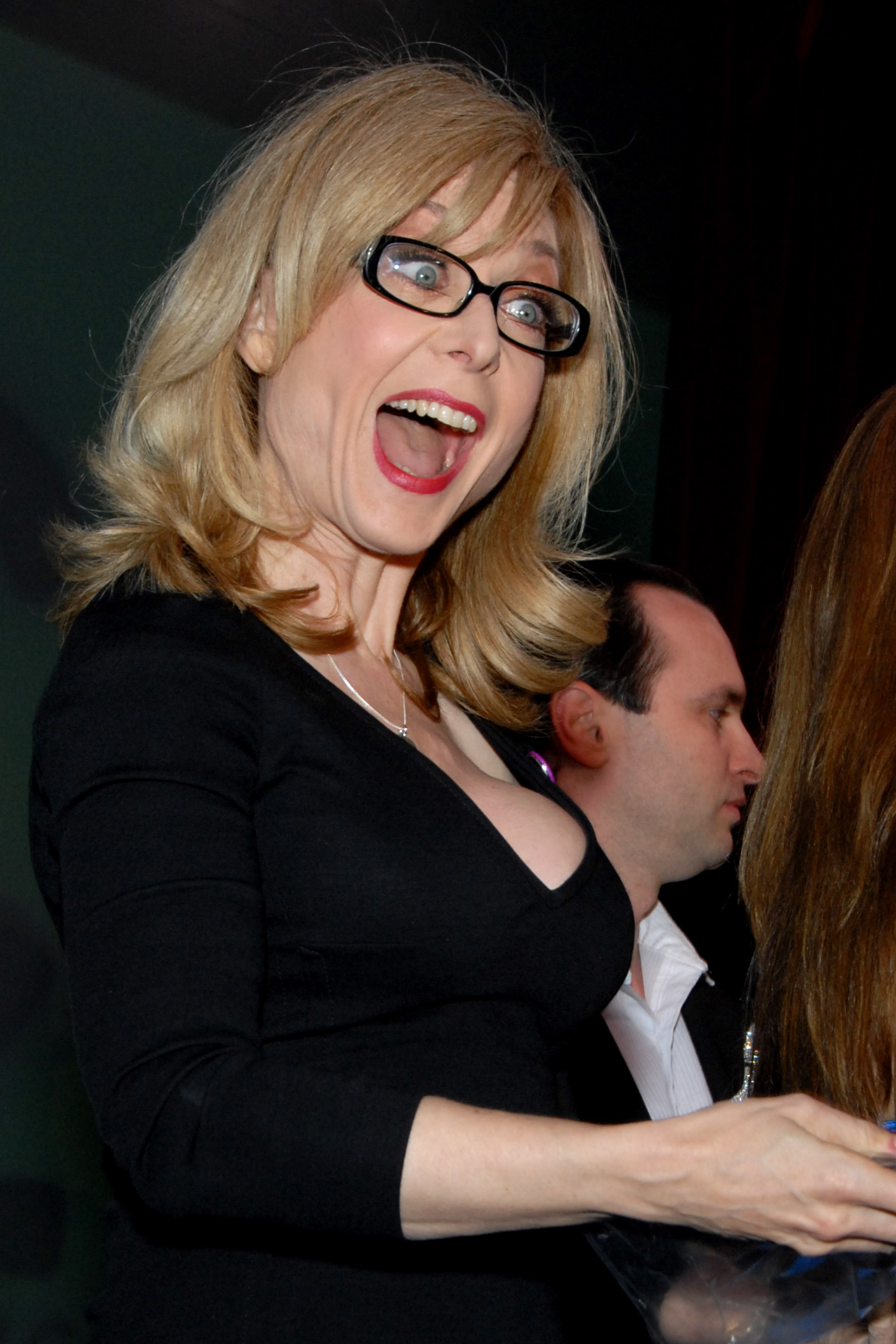
Nina Hartley at 2009 XRCO Award Show

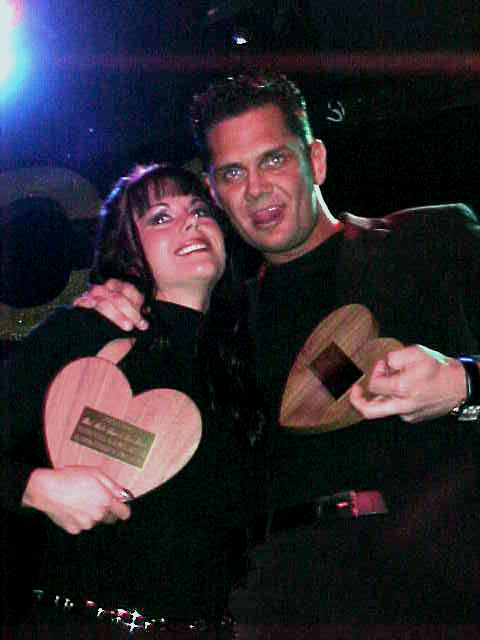
Jewel De'Nyle and Nacho Vidal holding their trophies for Best Male-Female Sex Scene, April 2001

- 1985: (Every Woman Has A Fantasy)
  - John Leslie
- 1986: (Ball Busters)
  - John Leslie
  - Nina Hartley
- 1991: (The Chameleon)
  - Buck Adams
  - Tori Welles
- 1994: (Mud Shark In The Water)
  - Britney Loara
  - Sean Michaels
- 1995: (Seymore and Shane on the Loose)
  - Lana
  - T. T. Boy
- 1996: (Kink)
  - Careena Collins
  - Rocco Siffredi
- 1997: (Max 8: The Fugitive)
  - Lovette
  - Max Hardcore
- 1998: (The Psychosexuals)
  - Mickey G.
- 1999: (Pink Hotel on Butt Row)
  - Elena
  - T. T. Boy
- 2000: (Nothing to Hide 3 and 4)
  - Gwen Summers
  - Julian
- 2001: (Xxxtreme Fantasies of Jewel De'Nyle)
  - Jewel De'Nyle
  - Nacho Vidal
- 2002: (Welcome To Chloeville 3)
  - Chloe
  - Mark Davis
- 2003: (The Fashionistas)
  - Rocco Siffredi
  - Taylor St. Claire
- 2004: (Babes in Pornland 14: Bubble Butt Babes – Puritan Video Productions)
  - Jewel De'Nyle
  - Manuel Ferrara
- 2005: (XXX – Mercenary Pictures)
  - Katsumi
  - Lexington Steele
- 2006: (Dark Side – Red Light District Video)
  - Herschel Savage
  - Penny Flame

== Best Mini-Feature Series ==
- 1994: Sodomania
- 1995: Sodomania

== Best On-Screen Chemistry ==
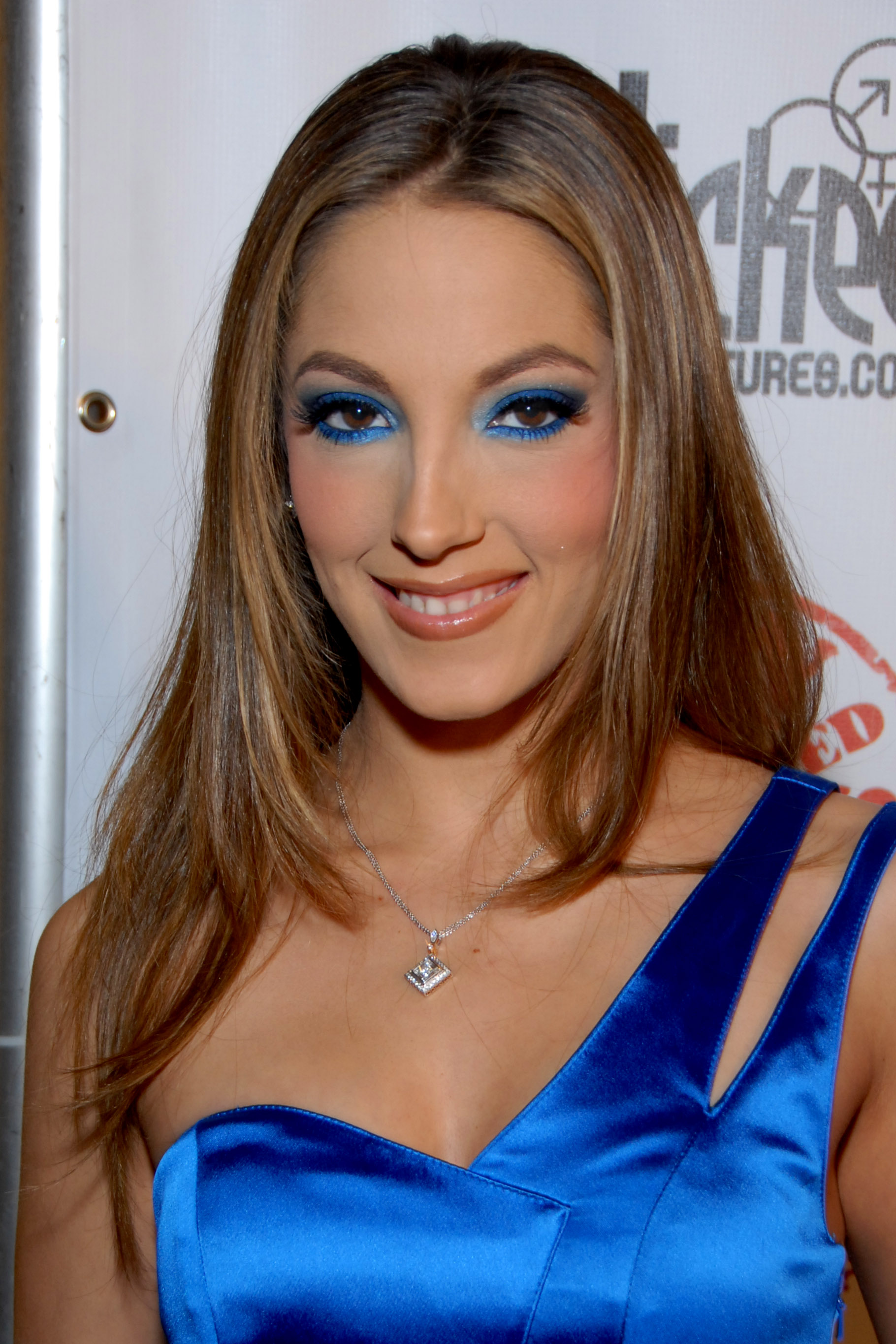
Jenna Haze at 2009 XRCO Award Show

- 2007: (Fashionistas Safado: The Challenge)
  - Gianna
  - Jenna Haze
  - Rocco
- 2008:
  - James Deen
  - Joanna Angel
- 2009:
  - James Deen
  - Joanna Angel

== Best POV Release or Series ==
- 2007: Jack's POV 5 (Digital Playground)
- 2008: inTERActive (Teravision/Hustler)
- 2009: Tunnel Vision 3 (Jules Jordan Productions)
- 2010: (tie) POV Jugg Fuckers 2 (Darkko Productions/Evil Angel) and POV Pervert 11 (Mike John Productions/Jules Jordan Video)
- 2011: POV Pervert (Mike John Productions/Jules Jordan Video)
- 2012: POV Pervert (Mike John Productions/Jules Jordan Video)
- 2013: POV Pervert (Mike John/Jules Jordan)
- 2015: POV Pervert (Mike John/Jules Jordan)
- 2016: Lex's Point of View (Evil Angel)
- 2017: POV Sluts (Toni Ribas/Evil Angel)
- 2018: Bang POV (Bang Bros)

== Best Release ==
- 2006: Pirates (Digital Playground/Adam & Eve)
- 2007: Curse Eternal (Wicked Pictures)
- 2008: Babysitters (Digital Playground)
- 2009: Cheerleaders (Digital Playground)
- 2010: Flight Attendants (X-Play/Adam & Eve Pictures)
- 2011: Pornstar Superheroes (Elegant Angel)
- 2012: Lost and Found (New Sensations)
- 2013: Wasteland (Elegant Angel Productions)
- 2014: The Submission of Emma Marx (New Sensations)
- 2015: Second Chances (New Sensations)
- 2016: Being Riley (Tushy/Jules Jordan Video)
- 2017: Preacher's Daughter (Wicked Pictures)
- 2018: The Submission of Emma Marx: Evolved (New Sensations)
- 2019: Abigail (Tushy)
- 2020: Drive (Deeper/Pulse)

Before the 2006 awards, separate categories existed for film, video and DVD.

=== Best Epic ===
- 2006: Pirates (Digital Playground/Adam & Eve)
- 2007: Corruption (Sex Z Pictures)
- 2008: Upload (Sex Z Pictures)
- 2009: (tie) Fallen (Wicked Pictures) and Pirates II: Stagnetti's Revenge (Digital Playground)
- 2010: 2040 (Wicked Pictures)
- 2011: Speed (Wicked Pictures)
- 2012: Portrait of a Call Girl (Elegant Angel)
- 2013: Voracious: The First Season (John Stagliano/Evil Angel)
- 2014: Underworld (Wicked Pictures)
- 2015: Wetwork (Vivid)
- 2016: Wanted (Wicked Pictures/Adam & Eve)

=== DVD of the Year ===
- 2001: Dream Quest
- 2002: Dark Angels: Special Edition
- 2003: Euphoria
- 2004: The Fashionistas (Evil Angel)
- 2005: Millionaire (Private U.S.A./Pure Play Media)

=== Best Feature Film of the Year ===
- 1985: Every Woman Has a Fantasy
- 1987: Every Woman Has a Fantasy 2
- 1988: Pretty Peaches 2
- 1991: Pretty Peaches 3 - The Quest
- 1992: Wild Goose Chase
- 1993: Chameleons Not the Sequel
- 1994: Justine: Nothing to Hide 2
- 1995: Dog Walker
- 1996: Borderline
- 1997: Sex Freaks
- 1998: Bad Wives
- 1999: Masseuse 3
- 2000: The Awakening
- 2001: Les Vampyres
- 2002: Fade to Black
- 2003: The Fashionistas
- 2004: Compulsion
- 2005: The Masseuse (Vivid Entertainment Group)
- 2005: Pirates

=== Best Video Feature of the Year ===
- 1985: Let Me Tell Ya 'bout White Chicks
- 1986: Black Throat
- 1987: Dream Girls
- 1988: Nightshift Nurses
- 1989: Catwoman
- 1990: The Chameleon
- 1991: Buttman's Ultimate Workout
- 1992: Buttman's European Vacation
- 1993: Buttman vs. Buttwoman
- 1994: Pussyman
- 1995: Takin' It to the Limit
- 1996: Latex
- 1997: Buttman In The Crack
- 1998: The Psychosexuals
- 1999: Café Flesh 2
- 2000: Torn
- 2001: Buttman's Toy Stories
- 2002: Euphoria
- 2003: The Ass Collector
- 2004: Beautiful
- 2005: In the Garden of Shadows (Ninn Worx/Pure Play Media)

== Best Screenplay ==
- 1985: Every Woman Has A Fantasy
- 1986: Taboo American Style
- 1988: Deep Throat II (Michael Evans)

== Best Series ==
- 1996: Joey Silvera's Butt Row

== Best Supporting Actor ==
- 1985: Joey Silvera (Public Affairs)
- 1986: Joey Silvera (She's So Fine)

== Best Supporting Actress ==
- 1985: Sharon Kane (Throat: 12 Years After)
- 1986: Kimberly Carson (Girls On Fire)
- 1987: Colleen Brennan (Star Angel)
- 1988: Amber Lynn (Taboo 5)
- 1989: Jacqueline Lorains (Beauty And The Beast)
- 1990: Nina Hartley (My Bare Lady)

== Best Threeway Sex Scene ==
- 2001: (Please 9)
  - Amanda
  - Jessica
  - Nacho Vidal
- 2002: (Up Your Ass 18)
  - Aurora Snow
  - Lexington Steele
  - Mr. Marcus
- 2003: (Trained Teens)
  - Aurora Snow
  - Gauge
  - Jules Jordan
- 2004: (Mason's Dirty Tricks – Elegant Angel)
  - Julie Night
  - Manuel Ferrara
  - Steve Holmes
- 2005: (Flesh Hunter 7 – Jules Jordan/Evil Angel)
  - Alberto Rey
  - Mark Ashley
  - Teagan Presley

== Best Vignette Series ==
- 1995: The Voyeur

== Deep Throat Award ==
- 2009: Angelina Valentine

== Female Performer of the Year ==
- 1985: Ginger Lynn
- 1989: Nina Hartley
- 1990: Tori Welles
- 1991: Christy Canyon
- 1992: Jeanna Fine
- 1993: Ashlyn Gere
- 1994: Debi Diamond
- 1995: Leena
- 1996: Juli Ashton
- 1997: Missy
- 1998: Jill Kelly
- 1999: Stacy Valentine
- 2000: Inari Vachs
- 2001: Jewel De'Nyle
- 2002: Jewel De'Nyle
- 2003: Belladonna
- 2004: Ashley Blue
- 2005: Lauren Phoenix
- 2006: Nicki Hunter
- 2007: Hillary Scott
- 2008: Sasha Grey
- 2009: Jenna Haze
- 2010: Tori Black
- 2011: Tori Black
- 2012: Asa Akira
- 2013: Asa Akira
- 2014: Remy LaCroix
- 2015: Anikka Albrite
- 2016: Adriana Chechik
- 2017: Adriana Chechik
- 2018: Angela White
- 2019: Angela White
- 2020: Angela White
- 2021: Emily Willis
- 2022 (tie): Gianna Dior & Emily Willis
- 2023: Jane Wilde
- 2024: Vanna Bardot
- 2025: Chanel Camryn
- 2026: Jennifer White

== Girl/Girl or Lesbian Performer of the Year ==
- 2016: Tanya Tate
- 2017: Shyla Jennings
- 2018: Charlotte Stokely
- 2019: Charlotte Stokely
- 2020: Charlotte Stokely
- 2021: Charlotte Stokely
- 2022: Charlotte Stokely
- 2023: Aidra Fox
- 2024: Anna Claire Clouds
- 2025: Anna Claire Clouds
- 2026: Kylie Rocket

== Kinky Scene ==
- 1985: (Insatiable II)
  - Jamie Gillis
  - Marilyn Chambers
- 1986: (Nasty)
  - Gayle Sterling
  - Jamie Gillis
  - Lynx Canon

== Mainstream Adult Media Favorite ==
- 2004: Mary Carey
- 2005: (tie) Seymore Butts (Family Business – Showtime Entertainment) and Jenna Jameson (How to Make Love Like a Porn Star – Regan Books)
- 2006: Stormy Daniels
- 2007: Ron Jeremy
- 2008: Stormy Daniels
- 2009: Sasha Grey
- 2010: Sasha Grey
- 2011: Riley Steele
- 2012: Bree Olson
- 2013: James Deen
- 2014: James Deen
- 2015: Asa Akira
- 2016: Jessica Drake
- 2017: Julia Ann
- 2018: Joanna Angel

== Male Performer of the Year ==
- 1994: Marc Wallice
- 1995: Jon Dough
- 1996: T. T. Boy
- 1997: T. T. Boy
- 1998: Tom Byron
- 1999: Mr. Marcus
- 2000: Bobby Vitale
- 2001: Evan Stone
- 2002: Lexington Steele
- 2003: Erik Everhard
- 2004: Manuel Ferrara
- 2005: Manuel Ferrara
- 2006: Manuel Ferrara
- 2007: Tommy Gunn
- 2008: Evan Stone
- 2009: James Deen
- 2010: Evan Stone
- 2011: Manuel Ferrara
- 2012: Manuel Ferrara
- 2013: Manuel Ferrara
- 2014: Manuel Ferrara
- 2015: Mick Blue
- 2016: Mick Blue
- 2017: Mick Blue
- 2018: Markus Dupree
- 2019: Small Hands
- 2020: Mick Blue

== MILF of the Year ==
- 2007: Janine
- 2008: Kylie Ireland
- 2009: Julia Ann
- 2010: Lisa Ann
- 2011: Julia Ann
- 2012: India Summer
- 2013: Veronica Avluv
- 2014: Francesca Le
- 2015: India Summer
- 2016: Kendra Lust
- 2017: Cherie DeVille
- 2018: Cherie Deville
- 2019: Bridgette B.
- 2020: Bridgette B.
- 2021: Britney Amber
- 2022: Brandi Love
- 2023: Natasha Nice
- 2024: Penny Barber
- 2025: Lexi Luna
- 2026: Penny Barber

== Most Outrageous DVD Extras ==
- 2007: Corruption (Sex Z Pictures)
- 2008: Upload (Sex Z Pictures)
- 2009: Pirates II: Stagnetti's Revenge (Digital Playground)
- 2010: 2040 (Wicked Pictures)
- 2011: Speed (Wicked Pictures)

== New Starlet ==
- 1985: Ginger Lynn
- 1986: Amber Lynn
- 1987: Barbara Dare
- 1988: Porsche Lynn
- 1989: Aja
- 1990: Tori Welles
- 1991: Ashlyn Gere
- 1992: Angela Summers
- 1993: Nikki Dial
- 1994: Shayla LaVeaux
- 1995: Misty Rain
- 1996: Jenna Jameson
- 1997: Stacy Valentine
- 1998: Nikita
- 1999: Raylene
- 2000: Jewel De'Nyle
- 2001: Tera Patrick
- 2002: Monica Mayhem
- 2003: Carmen Luvana
- 2004: Lauren Phoenix
- 2005: Teagan Presley
- 2006: Hillary Scott
- 2007: Sasha Grey
- 2008: Bree Olson
- 2009: Stoya
- 2010: Kagney Linn Karter
- 2011: (tie) Allie Haze & Chanel Preston
- 2012: Jessie Andrews
- 2013: Remy LaCroix
- 2014: A.J. Applegate
- 2015: Carter Cruise
- 2016: Abella Danger
- 2017: Elsa Jean
- 2018: (tie) Lena Paul & Whitney Wright
- 2019: Gia Derza
- 2020: Gianna Dior
- 2021: Avery Cristy
- 2022: Blake Blossom
- 2023: Nicole Doshi
- 2024: Chanel Camryn
- 2025: Gal Ritchie
- 2026: Cheerleader Kait

== New Stud ==
- 2000: Evan Stone
- 2001: Dillon Day
- 2003: Manuel Ferrara
- 2004: Ben English
- 2005: Tommy Gunn
- 2006: Scott Nails
- 2007: Derrick Pierce
- 2008: Charles Dera
- 2009: C.J. Wright
- 2010: Dane Cross
- 2011: Xander Corvus
- 2012: Giovanni Francesco
- 2013: Logan Pierce
- 2014: Tyler Nixon
- 2015: Rob Piper
- 2016: Damon Dice
- 2017: Ricky Johnson
- 2018: Dredd
- 2019: Jason Luv
- 2020: Stirling Cooper

== Oral Scene ==
- 1985: (Succulent)
  - Little Oral Annie
  - Ron Jeremy
- 1986: (Love Bites)
  - Amber Lynn
  - Peter North
  - Rick Savage

== Orgasmic or Awesome Analist ==
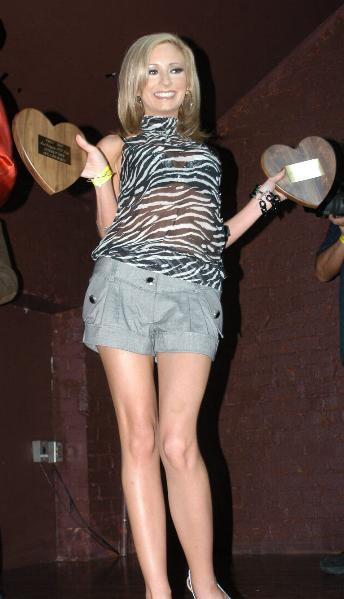
Hillary Scott holding up two 2007 XRCO Awards

- 2001: Chloe
- 2002: Jewel De'Nyle
- 2003: Belladonna
- 2004: Lauren Phoenix
- 2005: Lauren Phoenix
- 2006: Katja Kassin
- 2007: Hillary Scott
- 2008: Hillary Scott
- 2009: Belladonna
- 2010: Jenna Haze
- 2011: Bobbi Starr
- 2012: Bobbi Starr
- 2013: Kristina Rose
- 2014: Jada Stevens
- 2015: Adriana Chechik
- 2016: A.J. Applegate
- 2017: Vicki Chase
- 2018: Abella Danger
- 2019: Abella Danger
- 2020: Abella Danger
- 2021: Angela White
- 2022: Emily Willis
- 2023 (tie): Vicki Chase & Angela White
- 2024: Vicki Chase
- 2025: Liz Jordan
- 2026: Jennifer White

== Orgasmic Oralist ==
- 2000: Bobbi Bliss
- 2001: Inari Vachs
- 2002: Kaylynn
- 2003: Kaylynn
- 2004: Felicia Fox
- 2005: Roxy Jezel
- 2006: Hillary Scott
- 2007: Hillary Scott
- 2008: Jenna Haze
- 2009: Belladonna
- 2010: Bobbi Starr
- 2011: Jenna Haze
- 2012: Brooklyn Lee
- 2013: Brooklyn Lee
- 2014: Vicki Chase
- 2015: Vicki Chase
- 2016: Vicki Chase
- 2017: Vicki Chase
- 2018: Vicki Chase
- 2019: Vicki Chase
- 2020: Vicki Chase
- 2021: Vicki Chase
- 2022: Angela White
- 2023: Blake Blossom
- 2024: Nicole Doshi
- 2025: Willow Ryder
- 2026: Blake Blossom

== Personal Favorite ==
- 2021: Angela White
- 2022: Angela White
- 2023: Blake Blossom
- 2024: Angela White
- 2025: Blake Blossom
- 2026: Octavia Red

== Star Showcase ==
- 2019: I Am Angela
- 2020: Angela White: Dark Side
- 2021: Elsa Jean, Influence
- 2022: Influence: Emily Willis
- 2023: April Olsen Knows Best
- 2024: Deep Inside Jennifer White
- 2025: Fuck Angela
- 2026: Hollywood Whore: A Jennifer White Showcase Film

== Superslut ==
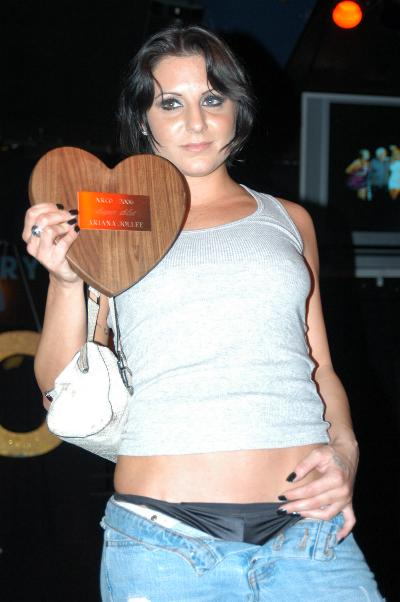
Ariana Jollee holding her 2006 XRCO Award for Superslut

- 2003: Catalina
- 2004: Julie Night
- 2005: Ariana Jollee
- 2006: Ariana Jollee
- 2007: Hillary Scott
- 2008: Annette Schwarz
- 2009: Bobbi Starr
- 2010: Bobbi Starr
- 2011: Kristina Rose
- 2012: Asa Akira
- 2013: Brooklyn Lee
- 2014: Bonnie Rotten
- 2015: Adriana Chechik
- 2016: Adriana Chechik
- 2017: Holly Hendrix
- 2018: Holly Hendrix
- 2019: Adriana Chechik
- 2020: Angela White
- 2021: Gia Derza
- 2022: Gia Derza
- 2023: April Olsen
- 2024: Summer Vixen
- 2025: Rebel Rhyder
- 2026: Rebel Rhyder

== Teen or Cream Dream ==
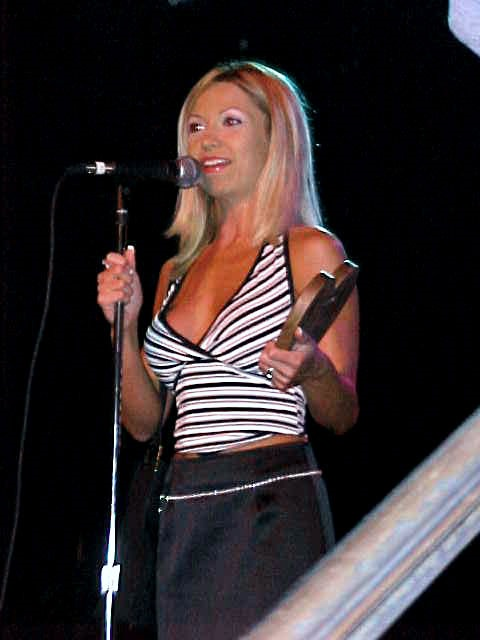
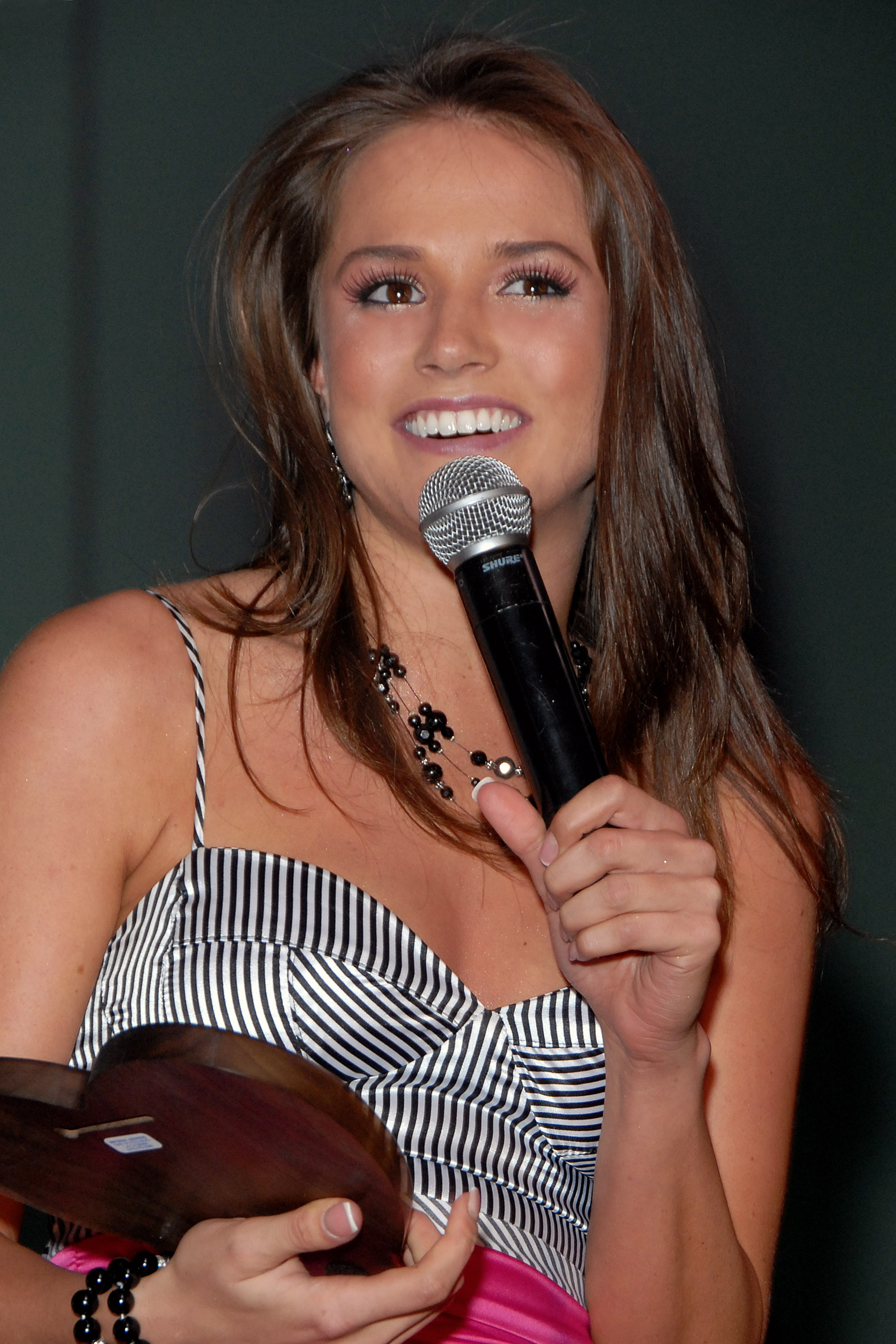
Allysin Chaynes (left) and Tori Black (right) accepting their Cream Dream awards in 2001 and 2009 respectively
- 2001: Allysin Chaynes
- 2002: Aurora Snow
- 2003: Ashley Blue
- 2004: Cytherea
- 2005: Teagan Presley
- 2006: Kinzie Kenner
- 2007: Mia Rose
- 2008: Bree Olson
- 2009: Tori Black
- 2010: Lexi Belle
- 2011: Tara Lynn Foxx
- 2012: Allie Haze
- 2013: Lily Carter
- 2014: Mia Malkova
- 2015: August Ames
- 2019: Kenzie Reeves
- 2020: Gabbie Carter
- 2021: Naomi Swann
- 2022: Liz Jordan
- 2023: Coco Lovelock
- 2024: Molly Little
- 2025: Hailey Rose
- 2026: Hailey Rose

== Trans Performer of the Year ==
- 2019: Aubrey Kate
- 2020: Aubrey Kate
- 2021: Daisy Taylor

== Unsung Siren ==
- 1993: Debi Diamond
- 1994: Lacy Rose
- 1995: Shane
- 1996: Tammi Ann
- 1997: Sindee Coxx
- 1998: Chloe
- 1999: Katie Gold
- 2000: Sydnee Steele
- 2001: Shelbee Myne
- 2002: Alana Evans
- 2003: Olivia Saint
- 2004: Sabrine Maui
- 2005: Katie Morgan
- 2006: Haley Paige
- 2007: Mika Tan
- 2008: Roxy DeVille
- 2009: Amber Rayne
- 2010: Marie Luv
- 2011: Charley Chase
- 2012: India Summer
- 2013: Vicki Chase
- 2014: Vicki Chase
- 2015: Casey Calvert
- 2016: Amber Rayne
- 2017: Veruca James
- 2018: Casey Calvert
- 2019: Valentina Nappi
- 2020: Kira Noir
- 2021: Aiden Ashley
- 2022: Natasha Nice
- 2023: Spencer Bradley
- 2024: Gizelle Blanco
- 2025: Chloe Amour
- 2026: Emma Rosie

== Unsung Swordsman ==
- 1996: Steve Hatcher
- 1997: Dave Hardman
- 1999: Luciano
- 2000: Ian Daniels
- 2001: Erik Everhard
- 2002: Dave Cummings
- 2003: Brandon Iron
- 2004: Steve Holmes
- 2005: Brian Surewood
- 2006: Brandon Iron
- 2007: Mark Wood
- 2008: James Deen
- 2009: Charles Dera
- 2010: Sascha
- 2011: Mark Ashley
- 2012: Mr. Pete
- 2013: Mark Ashley
- 2015: John Strong
- 2016: John Strong
- 2017: Johnny Sins
- 2018: Charles Dera
- 2019: Charles Dera
- 2020: Charles Dera

== Woodsman of the Year ==
- 1994: Sean Michaels
- 1995: Alex Sanders
- 1996: T. T. Boy

== Worst Movie ==
- 1994: Nympho Zombie Coeds
- 1995: Gum-Me-Bare
- 1996: World's Biggest Gang Bang
- 1997: Frankenpenis
- 1998: 87 And Still Bangin'
- 1999: World's Biggest Anal Gangbang
- 2000: The Vomitorium
- 2001: Watch Me Camp Bitch!
- 2002: Fossil Fuckers
- 2003: You're Never Too Old to Gangbang
