= Eva Angelina =

American pornographic film actress (born 1984/85)

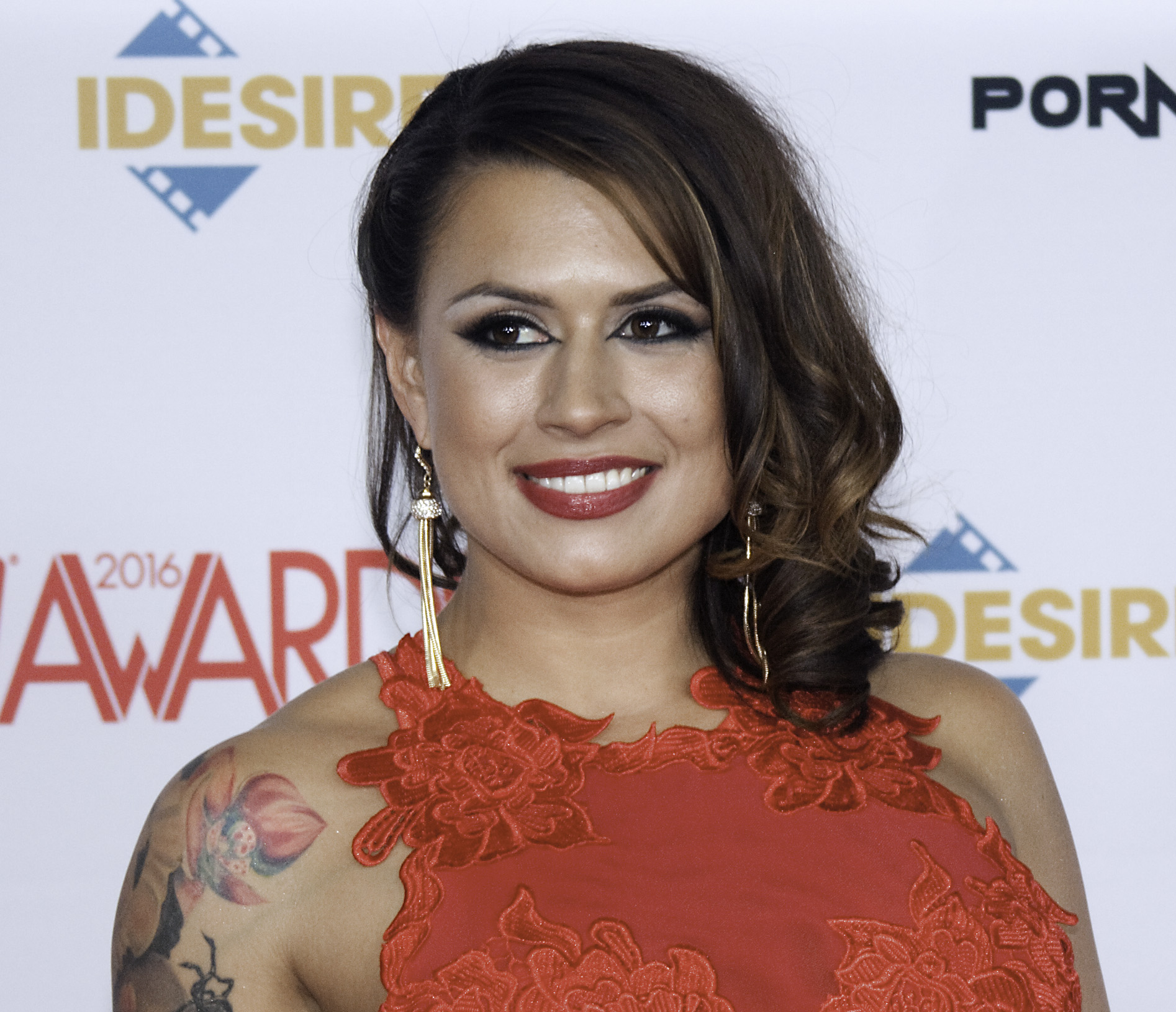
- Angelina in 2016
- Born: 1984 or 1985 (age 40–41); Huntington Beach, California, U.S.
- Occupation: Pornographic film actress
- Spouse: Danny Mountain (m. 2007–2009)

Eva Angelina (born 1984 or 1985) is an American pornographic film actress. She has won several industry awards, including the 2007 NightMoves Award for Best Actress, the 2008 AVN Award for Best Actress, the 2008 XRCO Award for Best Actress, and the 2008 XBIZ Award for Female Performer of the Year. She was inducted into the AVN Hall of Fame in 2018.

After retiring from the porn industry she worked in real estate and firefighting for several years, but made a comeback in 2024 signing a contract with Vixen Media Group.

== Early life ==
Angelina was born in Huntington Beach, California. She started in pornography at the age of 18. Three years later she applied to join the US Navy but was rejected because of insufficient college degrees.

== Career ==
Angelina entered the porn industry by answering a newspaper advertisement; her first scene was for the Shane's World series with Mr. Pete in 2003, at the age of 18. She became known for wearing glasses during her performances. During her career, she won several industry awards including the XBIZ award for Female Performer of the Year in 2008.

She was named a Penthouse Pet in 2010, and in the same year named by Maxim as one of the 12 top female stars in porn. In 2014, she told Vice that she had earned a real estate license and was seeking to transition away from porn. In 2018 she began training to become a firefighter and paramedic, and after graduating from St Petersburg College Firefighting Academy in Florida in 2021 she worked as a firefighter for three years, going under her real name Nicole Tyler.

In 2024, she made a significant comeback in the porn industry by signing a contract with Vixen Media Group to exclusively perform for their brands. Now embracing the MILF label, Angelina plans to remain in the industry for some time while also taking classes in medical school to eventually qualify for emergency department work.

== Personal life ==
Angelina was married to British pornographic film actor Danny Mountain from 2007 to 2009. She has two daughters. She spends her personal time doing CrossFit training and spending time with her family and friends. She also uses her voice to advocate for her former colleagues in the fire service.

== Awards ==
- 2007 AEBN VOD Award – Performer of the Year
- 2007 September Twistys Treat
- 2007 NightMoves Award – Best Actress (Fan's Choice)
- 2008 AVN Award – Best Actress - Video – Upload
- 2008 AVN Award – Best Solo Sex Scene - Video – Upload
- 2008 Adult Empire Award – Empire Girl
- 2008 XBIZ Award – Female Performer of the Year
- 2008 XRCO Award – Best Actress, Single Performance – Upload
- 2008 NightMoves Award – Best All-Sex Gonzo Release (Editor's Choice) – E for Eva
- 2010 AVN Award – Best All-Girl Group Sex Scene – Deviance
- 2010 XBIZ Award – Pornstar Website of the Year
- 2010 XRCO Award – Best Cumback
- 2010 June Penthouse Pet of the Month
- 2010 Fame Registry Award – Fan Favorite
- 2011 AVN Award – Best Tease Performance – Car Wash Girls
- 2011 Fame Registry Award – Fan Favorite Hottest Brunette
- 2012 Fame Registry Award – Fan Favorite Hottest Brunette
- 2018 AVN Hall of Fame
- 2025 NightMoves Hall of Fame
- 2025 Adult Empire Award – Comeback Star of the Year
- 2026 XMA Award – Best Sex Scene - Orgy/Group (Female Led) – Yes Chief
