= Wife, Mom, Bounty Hunter =

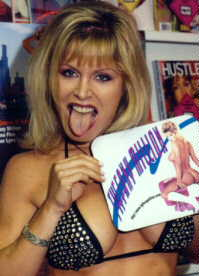
Sandra Scott, then known as Tiffany Million in the 90's.

Wife, Mom, Bounty Hunter is a reality TV show starring Sandra Scott balancing family life with running her own bail bonds business in Florence, Arizona, United States.
