= Jill Kelly (actress) =

American pornographic actress (born 1971)

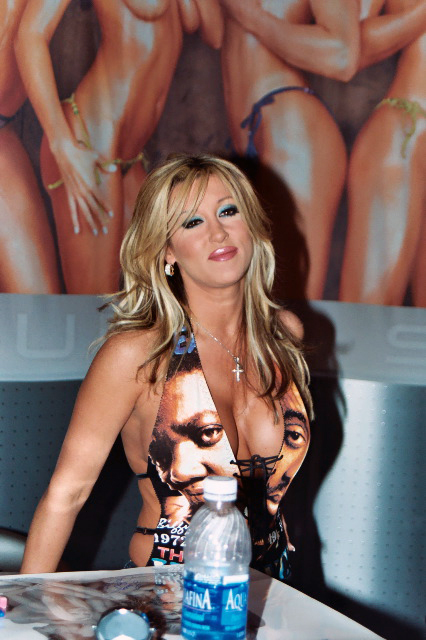
- Kelly at the 2003 Adult Entertainment Expo
- Born: Adrianne D. Moore; February 1, 1971 (age 55); Pomona, California, U.S.
- Other names: Jill Kellie; Calista Jammer; Jill Kelley; Adrian; Calista J.; Calista Jay, Jill Kennedy; Jill Roberts
- Occupations: Pornographic actress; director; producer
- Height: 5 ft 7 in (1.70 m)
- Spouses: Cal Jammer (m. 1993; died 1995) Julian Andretti (m. 2000; div. 2001) Corey Jordan (m. 2003; div. 2004)

Jill Kelly (born February 1, 1971) is an American pornographic actress, director and producer. Kelly is an AVN Hall of Fame inductee.

== Career ==
Kelly's stage name was derived from the names of the Charlie's Angels characters portrayed by Farrah Fawcett and Jaclyn Smith. She started out as a stripper at the Babydolls adult entertainment theater in her hometown, first performing at the age of 15 with false identification. After she broke up with her then-boyfriend, he informed the club of her true age, which caused them to fire her. When Kelly turned 18 she returned to the club, commenting that "they didn't even recognize me."

She later did live sex shows with Tiffany Million at the O'Farrell Theatre in San Francisco.

=== Mainstream appearances ===
Kelly has appeared in over 50 B movies, including The Legend of the Roller Blade Seven, Toad Warriors, and Big Sister 2000. In the spring of 1998, she appeared in Spike Lee's He Got Game.

=== Other ventures ===
Kelly started her own company, Jill Kelly Productions (JKP), in October 1998. In April 2005, following the company's bankruptcy filing, Penthouse magazine paid $1.765 million to acquire its assets, which included the entire JKP back catalogue and nearly 60 unreleased features.

== Personal life ==
A native of Southern California, Kelly was born in the Los Angeles suburb of Pomona. She "married" porn actor Cal Jammer, whom she met at a CES convention in Las Vegas in 1993. They were officially married a month later. Jammer introduced her to the world of adult movies and her career was launched. However, she separated from him due to his infidelities off-camera, which she called "the deal breaker". Jammer died by suicide, shooting himself.

On May 6, 2000, she married adult star Julian Andretti, but the couple were divorced by the end of 2001. She then was married for a third time, to porn actor/producer/director Corey Jordan on September 20, 2003. This marriage would not last, either, and the couple parted ways a year later only to finalize their divorce in October 2004.

Kelly also had an off-screen relationship with her fellow female colleague P.J. Sparxx in the mid-'90s. The pair would tour together and dance on stage as part of a dance duo act called "Fire & Ice". They also released a porn feature film of the dance act called Fire & Ice: Caught In The Act. Kelly and Sparxx elucidated on their relationship in the "Behind the Scenes" documentary series Sex Under Hot Lights. Sparxx posited that she and Kelly had similar sexual personalities. Kelly stated that Sparxx had supported her following her husband's suicide in January 1995. Sparxx and Kelly claimed to be exclusively involved in terms of women, but were in an open relationship in regards to other men, with Kelly claiming she was also involved with a boyfriend at the time.

Kelly identifies as bisexual.

== Awards ==
- 1996 AVN Award – Best All-Girl Sex Scene (Video) – Takin' It To The Limit 6 (with Careena Collins, Felecia, Misty Rain, & Traci Allen)
- 1996 XRCO Award – Best Girl-Girl Sex Scene – Takin' It To The Limit 6 (with Careena Collins, Felecia, Misty Rain, & Traci Allen)
- 1997 AVN Award – Best All-Girl Sex Scene (Film) – Dreams of Desire (with Melissa Hill)
- 1998 XRCO Award – Female Performer of the Year
- 1999 AVN Award – Best Couples Sex Scene (Video) – Dream Catcher (with Eric Price)
- 1999 Hot d'Or Award – Best American Actress – Exile
- 1999 NightMoves Award – Best Actress (Editor's Choice)
- 2001 FOXE Award – Female Fan Favorite
- 2002 FOXE Award – Female Fan Favorite
- 2003 AVN Hall of Fame
- 2003 FOXE Award – Female Performer of the Year
- 2006 Free Speech Coalition Lifetime Achievement Award
- 2007 NightMoves Hall of Fame
- 2011 Legends of Erotica Hall of Fame
