= Shane (actress) =

American former pornographic actress, director, producer (born 1969)

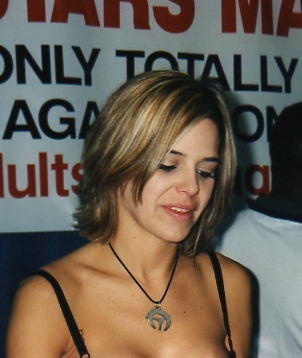
- Shane in 1998
- Born: December 16, 1969 (age 56)
- Occupations: Pornographic actress; writer
- Height: 5 ft 5 in (1.65 m)
- Spouse: Bobby Fernandez-Hewitt

Shane (born December 16, 1969) is an American former pornographic actress and writer, known for creating the Shane's World series of adult videos after having debuted in the Seymore Butts video series. She is also the founder of an adult film production company of the same name. Shane is a member of the AVN Hall of Fame.

== Career ==
At the age of 17, she began working as a stripper. Shane started her adult film career in 1993. According to her Adult Video News magazine profile, she and a girlfriend were impressed by a video made by Seymore Butts and decided to make a video of her own, which she sent to him. He invited her to Los Angeles, and soon after, she began making videos with him and for other production companies. The videos she made with Butts became among the most popular titles in reality porn. In 1994, Shane and Butts caused controversy when Shane performed a sex act on a volunteer firefighter at an Elmont, New York fire department without permission of the department for the video Seymore and Shane Playing with Fire. In addition to performing and appearing in Butts' videos and those for her own production company, she worked predominantly in non-sex roles for a variety of adult film studios such as Evil Angel, Flying Leap Productions, Odyssey Entertainment, VCA Pictures, and Wicked Pictures.

Shane broke up with her fiancé, Butts, in 1995 and started her own production company, Shane's World. In 1999, after the release of Shane’s World, Vol. 18: The Roller Coaster of Love, she retired from the adult industry to start a family with her husband.< After her retirement, Shane was involved in a trademark dispute with two former employees: her personal assistant and cameraman, who go by the industry pseudonyms of Jennie and Brian Grant. This resulted in a licensing deal for the Shane's World name and the production company continued under the ownership of the Grants.

Shane was inducted into the AVN Hall of Fame in 2005. In June 2007, Shane came out of retirement to shoot a video called Shane and Friends for Odyssey Video.

=== Directing ===
Shane's World movies revolve around taking porn stars out of their element on trips to exotic or interesting locations and filming everything that happens in a documentary style. The premise of the studio's movies can be summed up as "MTV's The Real World meets gonzo style pornography". Shane's World gave many stars their start, which helped to increase their fan base.

== Personal life ==
Shane is also known as Shannon Hewitt. She is married to Bobby Fernandez-Hewitt of the band Orgy.

== Awards ==
- 1995 X-Rated Critics Organization (XRCO) Unsung Siren
- 1996 Fans of X-Rated Entertainment (F.O.X.E) Female Fan Favorite
- 1997 XRCO Best Gonzo Series for Shanes World
- 1997 F.O.X.E Female Fan Favorite
- 1998 Free Speech Coalition Positive Image Award
- 2005 AVN Hall of Fame
