= Tiffany Million =

American pornographic actress and professional wrestler (born 1966)

Tyffany Million
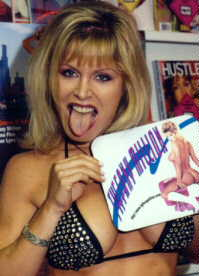
- Born: Sandra Lee Schwab; April 6, 1966 (age 60); Richmond, California, U.S.
- Other names: Tiffani Million; Tiffany Melon; Tiffany Millons; Tyffany Million; Tifanny Million; Sandra Margot; Tiffany Mellon; Tiffany Melons; Tiffany Millon; Tiffany Millions; Sandra Margot Giani; Sandra Margot-Escott; Sandra Scott
- Occupations: Professional wrestler; pornographic performer
- Height: 5 ft 5 in (1.65 m)

Tyffany Million (born Sandra Lee Schwab on April 6, 1966), also known as Tiffany Million, is a former professional wrestler and American pornographic performer who appeared in both heterosexual and lesbian videos. She retired from the adult industry in 1995.

As Sandra Scott, she was the subject of the 2007 reality show Wife, Mom, Bounty Hunter, which aired on WE: Women's Entertainment for one season. She also appeared as herself in the 2012 documentary film After Porn Ends.

== Career ==
=== Professional wrestling ===
In the late 1980s she became a member of the Gorgeous Ladies of Wrestling (G.L.O.W.) organization and adopted the wrestling name of "Tiffany Mellon". She and Roxy Astor were a tag team known as the "Park Avenue Knockouts". She left G.L.O.W. in 1989, claiming that G.L.O.W.'s management harassed her and a fellow wrestler because they were suspected of being lesbians.

=== Mainstream film and television ===
Million appeared in several mainstream films and television series such as Caged Fury, The Sleeping Car and Tales from the Crypt.

=== Adult films ===
In 1992 she entered the porn industry, making her first appearance in the video Twister. By 1995 she had appeared in about 100 X-rated films. She also started a production company, Immaculate Video Conceptions, and produced and directed seven movies that had a playful, feminist point of view. In 1994, she was one of the first adult film stars profiled in her own issue of the Carnal Comics line of autobiographical comic books. She does acknowledge that she was involved with women in her personal life and, for a time in the mid-'90s, she had a relationship with porn actress and fellow Carnal Comics star Jill Kelly.

For 20 years, Million worked as a stripper.

=== Later career ===
After getting an inheritance, she quit the adult business.

According to her website, she is now a happily married mother of two children. She is a self-described libertarian and individualist feminist.

As of 2007, she was going by the names Sandra Margot-Escott and Sandra Scott and is a bounty hunter and private investigator for Skye-Lane Investigations. By no later than 2004, according to her website, she was refusing to answer questions about her pornography career.

She is featured on the reality TV show, Wife, Mom, Bounty Hunter, which premiered on the WE Channel on April 20, 2007. In 2010, she appeared in the documentary After Porn Ends.

== Awards ==
- 1993 XRCO Award – Best Couples Scene – Face Dance 2
- 1994 AVN Award – Best Group Scene, Film – New Wave Hookers 3
- 1995 AVN Award – Best Supporting Actress, Film – Sex
- 1995 XRCO Award – Best Actress, Single Performance – Sex
- 2025 AVN Hall of Fame
- 2026 XRCO Hall of Fame
