= Leena La Bianca =

Italian American pornographic film actress

- Occupation: Pornographic film actress
- Years active: 1992–present
- Website: leenalabianca.com

Leena La Bianca is an American pornographic film actress.

== Early life ==
Born in Italy, La Bianca grew up in Denver, Colorado. She began in the amateur side of the pornography industry before moving to California to become a full-time pornographic film actress, making her professional pornographic debut in a movie titled Leena (1992).

== Career ==
La Bianca has also acted in theater in the 1996 play Sweet Hostage and in 1998, she was in The Actors' Gang play, Steeltown.

== Awards ==
- 1994 AVN Award - Best Actress, Video (Blinded by Love)
- 1994 XRCO Award - Best Actress, Single Performance (Blinded by Love)
- 1995 AVN Award - Best Group Sex Scene, Video (Pussyman 5)
- 1995 XRCO Award - Female Performer of the Year
- 1995 FOXE Award - Female Fan Favorite
- 2009 XRCO Hall of Fame inductee
