= Chloe Amour =

American pornographic film actress and model (born 1991/1992)

- Born: 1991 or 1992 (age 34–35); San Antonio, Texas, U.S.
- Occupations: Pornographic film actress; model
- Years active: 2013–present

Chloe Amour (born 1991 or 1992) is an American pornographic film actress. Born in San Antonio, Texas, she is of Cherokee, Spanish and Mexican descent. Amour moved to California to pursue a career in adult films after being discovered by an agent from Model Mayhem. Amour won a XRCO Award in 2025 and a XMA Award in 2026.

== Career ==
Chloe Amour entered the porn industry at the age of 22. Working as a fashion model, she was recruited by an agency who had seen her shooting scenes for Playboy Plus. Amour was active in the porn industry from April 2013 to December 2018 and then decided to have a year off to recover from a burnout caused by a hectic work schedule. When she returned in early 2020 the COVID-19 pandemic hit, productions were shut off for several months and her intended one year off from the adult industry was extended to a five year hiatus. In 2023, she made a second comeback. Amour began featuring in more and more films and during 2024, she starred in a scene Explicit Acts 4 with fellow star Olivia Jay for Vixen Media Group as well as The Shower for 2 Drops. In the spring of 2025, Amour made headlines for her Digital Sins film He's In Charge Vol 6 with male star Milan Ponjevic. She also featured in a scene with fellow Latina star Katana Kombat in collaboration with creator 2 Drops. During her career, Amour has been a multiple nominee for XBIZ, AVN and XRCO awards and fronted many magazine covers. Amour was nominated for 5 different categories during 2026 AVN Awards.
