= Let Me Tell Ya 'bout Black Chicks =

- Directed by: Gregory Dark
- Written by: Gregory Dark; Antonio Passolini (Anthony R. Lovett)
- Produced by: Gregory Dark; Walter Dark
- Cinematography: Junior "Speedy" Bodden
- Edited by: Alex Craig
- Music by: Johnny Powers
- Distributed by: VCA Pictures
- Release date: 1985
- Running time: 69 minutes

Let Me Tell Ya 'bout Black Chicks is an interracial pornographic film from 1985 directed by Gregory Dark and produced by the Dark Brothers (Gregory Dark and Walter Dark). It is a follow-up to the 1984 film Let Me Tell Ya 'bout White Chicks.

== Synopsis ==
The film begins with four African-American women (Cherry Layme, Lady Stephanie, Purple Passion, and Sahara) lounging in a hotel room. The four are dressed as maids and they discuss sexual encounters they have had with white men (and in one instance with a white woman). Their manner and dialog has been criticized for playing to stereotypes.

== Klansmen scene controversy ==
Sahara with Steve Powers and Mark Wallice dressed as Klansmen

Like many of the films produced by the Dark Brothers, Let Me Tell Ya 'bout Black Chicks is controversial. One scene in particular led to the withdrawal of the film from the home video market. In the scene involving Sahara, Steve Powers, and Mark Wallice, the two men are dressed as members of the Ku Klux Klan, a white supremacist organization. When the pair encounter Sahara they say "Let's fuck the shit out of this darky!" and begin a series of racist remarks that continues throughout the scene. Despite the insults, or perhaps because of them, Sahara is portrayed as an enthusiastic participant in the sexual encounter, which includes fellatio and double penetration. In relating the encounter to the other maids, Sahara describes the experience as "too good".

According to script writer Antonio Passolini, the film-makers' intention was to be as politically incorrect as possible. Passolini says that he originally intended to portray Sahara "masturbating to [a] picture of Jesus that she was looking at as she cleaned the altar at a church", but Gregory Dark would not film it that way. Instead, the Klansmen find Sahara masturbating while listening to gospel music. Director Gregory Dark says of the scene, "I had these Ku Klux Klan guys riding on top of black girls as if they're horses. That scene made me happy."

== Cast ==
Actresses

- Black Sapphire
- Fallon (aka Robin Lee)
- Lady Stephanie (aka Stephanie Bradley)
- Cherry Layme
- Jeannie Pepper
- Purple Passion
- Sahara

Actors

- Dan T. Mann
- Tony Martino (aka Chuck Martino, Philmore Butts)
- Tony Montana
- Steve Powers
- Marc Wallice
- Ray Wells
