= Let Me Tell Ya 'bout White Chicks =

- Directed by: Donald Dash; Gregory Dark
- Written by: Donald Dash; Gregory Dark
- Produced by: Gregory Dark, Walter Dark
- Edited by: Cynthia Wisper
- Music by: Johnny Powers
- Distributed by: VCA Pictures
- Release date: 1984
- Running time: 67 minutes

Let Me Tell Ya 'bout White Chicks is an interracial pornographic film from 1984 and the first pornographic film directed and produced by the Dark Brothers, Gregory Dark and Walter Dark.

== Background ==
Early 1980s American pornographic film producers began to acknowledge that their films had not been appealing for a black male audience and Let Me Tell Ya 'bout White Chicks was particularly the Dark Brothers effort in such nascent niche. The film was followed by the controversial Let Me Tell Ya 'bout Black Chicks in 1985.

== Synopsis ==
A group of African-American men, mostly petty criminals, gathered in a room are talking about their experiences with white women. It is soon revealed that one of them (Tony El-Ay) never had sex with a white woman. Furthermore, he rejects the very idea and his friends try to convince him by praising white women. Before he is finally won over, he confesses his fear of white women.

== Cast ==
Actresses

- Kristie Duval (as Christy)
- Deidre Hopkins
- Helen Detoit
- Maria Tortuga
- Pat Manning
- Sondra Stillman (aka Lois Ayres)
- Sophia Charm

Actors

- Bubba the Black
- Doobie Brown
- Fast Talking Sammy
- Jack Baker
- Robbie Dee
- Tony El-Ay (as Tony El'Ay)
