= Kim Chambers =

American pornographic actress (born 1974)

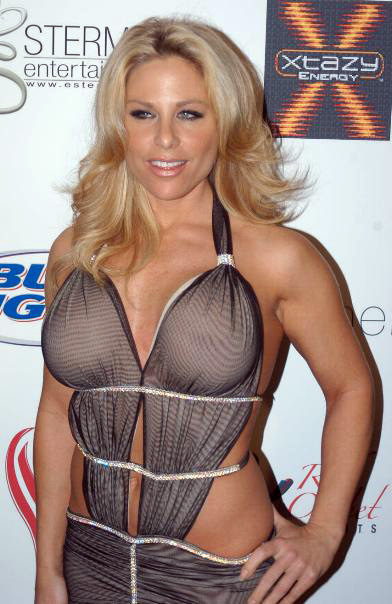
- Chambers at Ron Jeremy's birthday party, 2007
- Born: January 11, 1974 (age 52); Fullerton, California, USA
- Occupation: Pornographic actress
- Height: 5 ft 4 in (1.63 m)
- Spouse: Scott Styles (divorced)

Kimberly Chambers (born January 11, 1974) is an American retired pornographic actress.

== Career ==
She entered the adult film industry in 1993 at the age of around 19 and has since performed in over 200 films. She has also directed at least four films. Chambers picked her stage name as an homage to Marilyn Chambers, whom she met when she was 16 years-old.

In 2002, she appeared with her then-husband Scott Styles, whom she married in 1998, and Ron Jeremy in an infomercial for a male enhancement product called ExtenZe. She also appeared as herself on Ricki Lake in 2002 with her then husband. She retired as an adult performer in 2008.

Since leaving the adult industry, Chambers has been a professional figure competitor and has given advice on sex, health, and fitness with columns in Marie Claire, American Curves, and Muscle Mayhem. Chambers also released a DVD called "Kimflex: Behind the Scenes", which featured nude workouts and erotic dancing. She has also hosted a weekly "Ask a Porn Star" segment on KBPI's "The Uncle Nasty Show" broadcast in Denver, Colorado.

== Awards ==
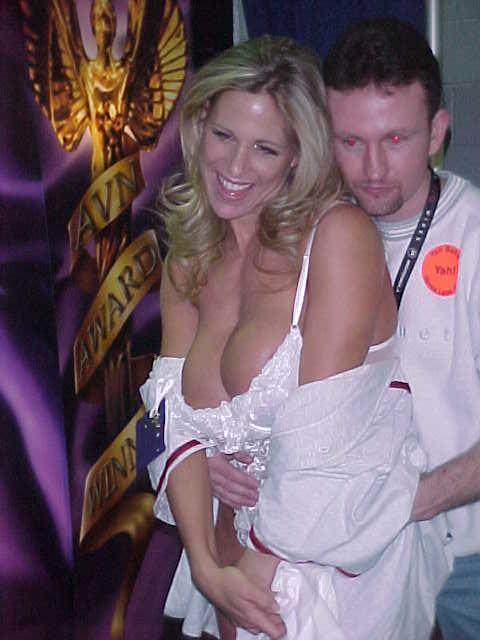
Chambers with her former husband Scott Styles at the 2000 AVN Expo

- 1994 XRCO Award winner – Best Anal Sex Scene (Butt Banged Bicycle Babes) with Yvonne, Mark Davis & John Stagliano
- 2001 FOXE Award winner – Female Fan Favorite
- 2002 AVN Award winner – Best Solo Sex Scene (Edge Play - VCA Pictures)
