= Shane's World =

American pornographic film company

- Company type: Private
- Industry: Pornography
- Founded: 1996; 30 years ago
- Founder: Shane
- Headquarters: United States
- Area served: Worldwide
- Products: Pornographic films
- Website: www.shanesworld.com

Shane's World Studios is an American independent pornographic film company started in 1996. It is one of the first companies to pioneer the reality style videos of adult entertainment. The company was originally started by Seymore Butts' ex-girlfriend Shane, who lent her name to the business. Shane had sold the company in 1999 after she decided to get married and leave the adult industry.

== History ==
Shane's World films revolve around taking porn stars out of their element, on trips to exotic or interesting locations, and filming everything that happens in a documentary style. The premise of the studio's films can be summed up as "The Real World meets gonzo style pornography". Shane's World has given many stars their start, which helps to increase their fan base because of the intimate look that fans are allowed into their personality.

In 2003 Shane's World gained mainstream notoriety with the release of Shane's World 32: Campus Invasion. The media interest which followed that trip to Indiana University landed the company on Dateline NBC, The O'Reilly Factor, Inside Edition, USA Today, Time magazine and MTV News. Rolling Stone magazine gave Shane's World a four-page spread in their "100 Greatest Guitarists" issue. Shane's World also became the first adult company to be featured in an Abercrombie and Fitch catalog.

The company has been criticized for exploiting drunken college students who will later regret their performance in a porn film.

Due to the success of Shane's World 32, Shane's World decided that college campuses were an untapped market and so the College Invasion series began. College Invasion titles bring porn stars to college campuses to party with the students, and starting with volume 3, the college students often participate and have sex with the porn stars. The studio claims it gets hundreds of invitation letters a month from students across the country who want them to come to their school. The series hit its 11th volume in March 2007.

On August 29, 2007, Shane's World released its first College Invasion Male title, a series that sees male porn stars visit gay college parties.

The company has won several awards within the Adult Entertainment industry, including Best Couples Sex video and Best Couples Sex series, as well as Most Sex-Positive Adult Company by the Sexuality.org awards. College Invasion won 'Best Gonzo Series' at the 2007 AVN Awards.

Shane's World Studios also markets a line of adult novelties through Cal Exotics. In October 2008, Shane's World announced that it had launched a competition through its YouTube channel to find the college at which they would shoot the next episode of their College Invasion series. The announcement encouraged non-pornographic clips only of between 1 and 2 minutes in length shot by students on the grounds of their college.

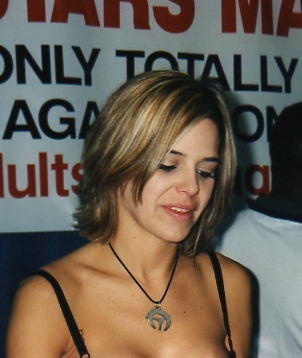
Shane signing at CES

== Notes ==
- Fraternity House Porn Stars Suspended By University. March 30, 2005.
- Rolling Stone magazine article by Ken Hegan: The New Sex Ed, Rolling Stone, August 27, 2003.
- CNN: Indiana Univ. may sue over porn film shot on campus, November 22, 2002.
