= VCA Pictures =

American pornographic film company

- Industry: Pornography
- Founder: Russ Hampshire
- Headquarters: United States
- Products: Pornographic films
- Parent: Hustler Video
- Website: vcaxxx.com

VCA Pictures (Video Company of America) is an American independent pornographic film production and distribution company. The company was founded by Russ Hampshire, and was formerly a major player during the 'Golden Age of Porn'. Throughout the 1970s and 1980s VCA produced big budget, plot-oriented feature films. In 1982 VCA sold 12,000 units of Insatiable on its first day of release, making it the top selling video (not just adult video) that year in America. In the 1990s Hampshire served one year in jail for the interstate transportation of obscene materials. In 2003, VCA was bought by Hustler Video, a subsidiary of Larry Flynt-owned Larry Flynt Publications. VCA maintains a separate identity within the LFP conglomerate. VCA distributed the 1998 documentary Wadd: The Life & Times of John C. Holmes, and in 2004 provided footage for the HBO documentary Pornucopia.

== Films ==
Notable films VCA has produced or distributed include Insatiable, New Wave Hookers, The Devil in Miss Jones 2, The Opening of Misty Beethoven, Times Square Comes Alive, Café Flesh, Debbie Does Dallas 3, Black Throat, Let Me Tell Ya 'bout Black Chicks and Britney Rears.

== Directors ==
Notable directors to have worked for VCA include Jim Holliday, Axel Braun, Gerard Damiano, Alex de Renzy, Gregory Dark, Henri Pachard, John Leslie, Paul Thomas, John Stagliano, Ben Dover, Michael Ninn, Veronica Hart, Eon McKai, Chloe, Nicki Hunter and Eli Cross.

== Awards ==
The following is a selection of some of the major awards VCA films have won:

- 1984 AVN Award – Best Art Director – Film (Cafe Flesh)
- 1986 AVN Award – Best Film (Raw Talent)
- 1986 AVN Award – Best Cinematography (Raw Talent)
- 1986 AVN Award – Best Screenplay – Film (Raw Talent)
- 1987 AVN Award – Best Film (The Devil in Miss Jones, Part 3)
- 1987 AVN Award – Best Screenplay – Film (Sexually Altered States)
- 1987 AVN Award – Best Foreign Feature (Comeback of Marilyn)
- 1988 AVN Award – Best All-Sex Release (Baby Face II)
- 1988 AVN Award – Best Editing – Film (Baby Face II)
- 1988 AVN Award – Best Editing – Video (Edwin Durell's Dreamgirls)
- 1989 AVN Award – Best All-Sex Release (Angel Puss)
- 1989 AVN Award – Best Film (Pretty Peaches 2)
- 1989 AVN Award – Best Director – Film (Pretty Peaches 2)
- 1989 ANV Award – Best Editing – Film (Pretty Peaches 2)
- 1989 AVN Award – Best Director – Video (Catwoman)
- 1989 AVN Award – Best Editing – Video (Catwoman)
- 1989 AVN Award – Best Screenplay – Video (Catwoman)
- 1989 AVN Award – Best Video Feature (Catwoman)
- 1990 AVN Award – Best Couples Sex Scene (The Chameleon)
- 1990 AVN Award – Best Video Feature (Mad Love)
- 1991 AVN Award – Top Renting Release of the Year (Pretty Peaches 3)
- 1991 AVN Award – Best Couples Sex Scene (Beauty & the Beast 2)
- 1991 AVN Award – Best Director – Video (Beauty & the Beast 2)
- 1991 AVN Award – Best Editing – Video (Beauty & the Beast 2)
- 1991 AVN Award – Best Video Feature (Beauty & the Beast 2)
- 1992 AVN Award – Top Selling Release of the Year (New Wave Hookers 2)
- 1992 AVN Award – Best Editing – Video (Curse of the Catwoman)
- 1992 AVN Award – Best Video Feature (Curse of the Catwoman)
- 1992 AVN Award – Best Packaging - Film (New Wave Hookers 2)
- 1993 AVN Award – Best Compilation Tape (Only the Very Best on Film)
- 1993 AVN Award – Top Selling Release of the Year (Chameleons)
- 1993 AVN Award – Top Renting Release of the Year (Chameleons)
- 1993 ANV Award – Best Editing – Film (Chameleons)
- 1994 AVN Award – Top Renting Release of the Year (New Wave Hookers 3)
- 1994 AVN Award – Best Editing – Video (The Creasemaster's Wife)
- 1994 AVN Award – Best Boxcover Concept (Rocket Girls)
- 1994 AVN Award – Best Group Sex Scene– Film (New Wave Hookers 3)
- 1994 AVN Award – Best Overall Marketing Campaign – Video (American Garter)
- 1995 AVN Award – Best Film (Sex)
- 1995 AVN Award – Best Editing – Film (Sex)
- 1995 AVN Award – Best Art Direction – Film (Sex)
- 1995 AVN Award – Best Art Direction – Video (Bad Habits)
- 1995 AVN Award – Best Special Effects (Virtual Sex)
- 1995 XRCO Award – Best Video (Latex)
- 1996 AVN Award – Top Selling Release of the Year (Latex)
- 1996 AVN Award – Best Art Direction – Video (Latex)
- 1996 AVN Award – Best Editing – Video (Latex)
- 1996 AVN Award – Best Special Effects (Latex)
- 1996 AVN Award – Best Video Feature (Latex)
- 1996 AVN Award – Top Renting Release of the Year (Latex)
- 1996 AVN Award – Best Cinematography for (Sex 2)
- 1997 AVN Award – Top Selling Release of the Year (Shock)
- 1997 AVN Award – Best Art Direction – Video (Shock)
- 1997 AVN Award – Best Director – Video (Shock)
- 1997 AVN Award – Best Editing – Video (Shock)
- 1997 AVN Award – Best Special Effects (Shock)
- 1997 AVN Award – Best Video Feature (Shock)
- 1997 AVN Award – Top Renting Release of the Year (Shock)
- 1998 AVN Award – Best All-Girl Release (Diva 4)
- 1998 AVN Award – Best Art Direction – Video (New Wave Hookers 5: The Next Generation)
- 1998 AVN Award – Best Special Effects (New Wave Hookers 5)
- 1998 AVN Award – Best Trailer (New Wave Hookers 5)
- 1998 AVN Award – Best Art Direction - Video (New Wave Hookers 5)
- 1998 AVN Award – Top Renting Release of the Year (New Wave Hookers 5)
- 1998 AVN Award – Best All-Girl Feature (Diva 4)
- 1998 AVN Award – Best All-Girl Series (Diva)
- 1998 AVN Award – Best Overall Marketing Campaign - Company Image
- 1998 AVN Award – Best Videography (Diva)
- 1998 XRCO Award – Best Video (Cafe Flesh 2)
- 1999 AVN Award – Best Couples Sex Scene (Dream Catcher)
- 1999 AVN Award – Best Video Feature (Cafe Flesh 2)
- 1999 AVN Award – Best Special Effects (Cafe Flesh 2)
- 1999 AVN Award – Best Ethnic-Themed Release (Dinner Party at Six)
- 2000 AVN Award – Top Renting Release of the Year (Devil in Miss Jones 6)
- 2000 AVN Award – Best Video Feature (Dark Garden)
- 2000 AVN Award – Best Classic DVD (The Devil in Miss Jones Parts III & IV)
- 2000 AVN Award – Best DVD (Cashmere)
- 2000 AVN Award – Best Special Effects (Cashmere)
- 2001 AVN Award – Best Classic DVD (Chameleons Not the Sequel)
- 2001 AVN Award – Best Art Direction – Video (Shayla's Web)
- 2001 AVN Award – Best DVD (Raw)
- 2001 AVN Award – Best Screenplay – Video (Raw)
- 2002 AVN Award – Best DVD (Unreal)
- 2002 AVN Award – Best Classic DVD (The Opening of Misty Beethoven)
- 2002 AVN Award – Best Sex Comedy (Cap'n Mongo's Porno Playhouse)
- 2003 AVN Award – Best Classic DVD (Pretty Peaches 2)
- 2004 AVN Award – Best Editing – Video (New Wave Hookers 7)
- 2004 XRCO Award – Best Comedy or Parody (Misty Beethoven: The Musical)
- 2005 AVN Award – Best Sex Comedy (Misty Beethoven: The Musical)
- 2005 AVN award – Most Outrageous Sex Scene (Misty Beethoven: The Musical) with Chloe, Ava Vincent & Randy Spears
- 2006 AVN award – Most Outrageous Sex Scene (Re-Penetrator) with Joanna Angel
- 2007 AVN Award – Best All Sex Release (Neu Wave Hookers) – shared with Blacklight Beauties (Pulse Pictures)
