= 32nd AVN Awards =

US adult industry award ceremony in 2015

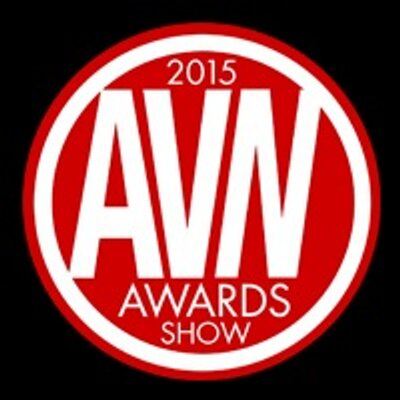
- Date: January 24, 2015
- Site: The Joint; Hard Rock Hotel and Casino, Paradise, Nevada, USA
- Hosted by: Alexis Texas; Tommy Pistol; Danielle Stewart
- Preshow hosts: Joanna Angel; Dana DeArmond; Karlie Montana

Highlights
- Best Picture: 24 XXX: An Axel Braun Parody
- Most nominations: Aftermath (22)

32nd AVN Awards was an event during which Adult Video News (AVN) presented its annual AVN Awards to honor the best pornographic movies and adult entertainment products of 2014 in the United States. The ceremony was held on January 24, 2015, at The Joint in the Hard Rock Hotel and Casino, Paradise, Nevada. The 32nd AVN Awards were co-hosted by Alexis Texas and Tommy Pistol.

24 XXX: An Axel Braun Parody won Best Parody, Best Screenplay-Parody, and Movie of the Year, with Axel Braun also winning Best Director-Parody, while Aftermath, which had the most nominations of any movie, won Best Drama, Best Screenplay, and Armstrong took home Best Director-Feature. The coveted Best New Starlet and Female Performer of the Year awards went to Carter Cruise and Anikka Albrite respectively. Albrite's husband, Mick Blue, won the Male Performer of the Year title. This marks the first time in the show's history that a married couple has simultaneously won both Performer of the Year awards.

The International Business Times found "a surprise: The Best Non-Feature Film award went to a female director, Mason, for Allie, although she was a no-show at the ceremony she also won Director of the Year.

A video featuring Tila Tequila won the award for Best Celebrity Sex Tape over videos featuring Farrah Abraham and Mimi Faust.

The awards show was recorded for its annual national broadcast on cable TV in the United States in mid-2015.

== Winners and nominees ==
On August 27, 2014, the award categories for the 2015 ceremonies were announced. A change to the categories was announced in that VOD-only titles would be accepted according to certain eligibility requirements.

On November 20, 2014, the nominees for the 2015 awards were announced at an event in Hollywood which represented the first time that AVN Media Network had announced its nominees at a public event. According to the AVN staff, "AVN streamlined the categories for the 2015 AVN Awards with the aim of making it easier for studios, directors and performers to find the correct ways in which to nominate their work. Some redundancies were eliminated and categories that were too similar were in some cases merged to create a tight list of 108 categories."

=== Major awards ===
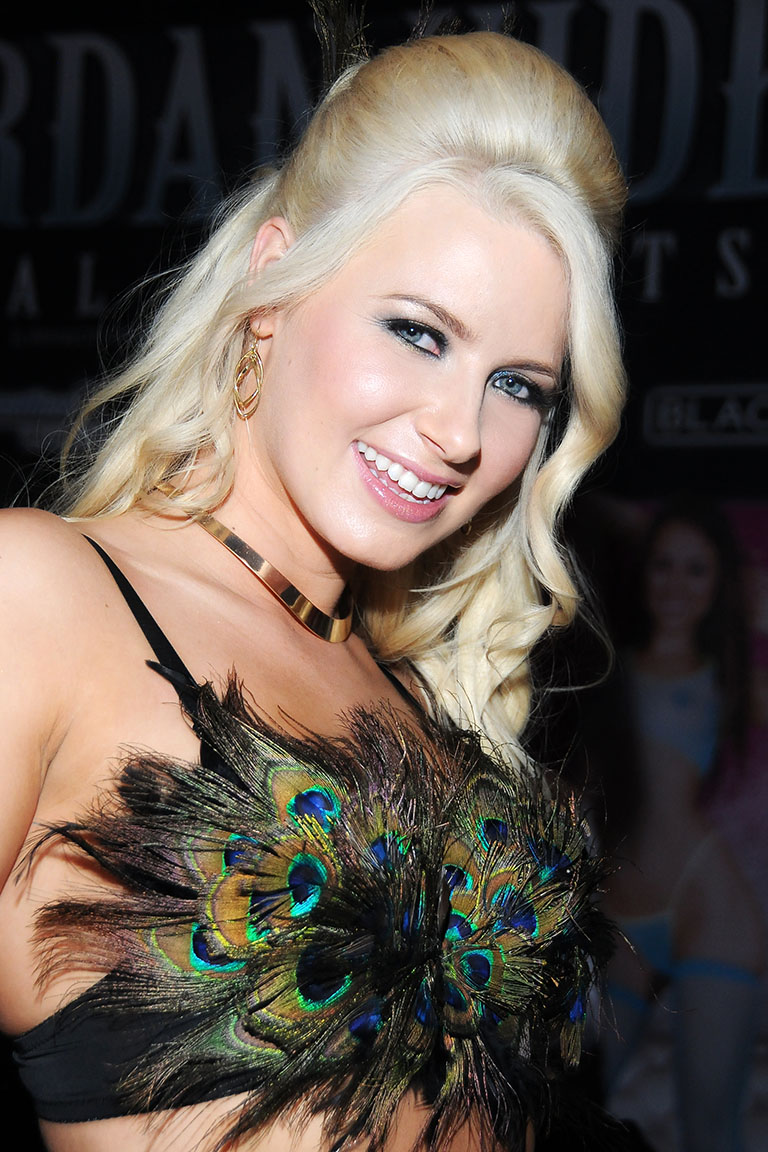
Anikka Albrite, winner of the 2015 AVN Female Performer of the Year Award

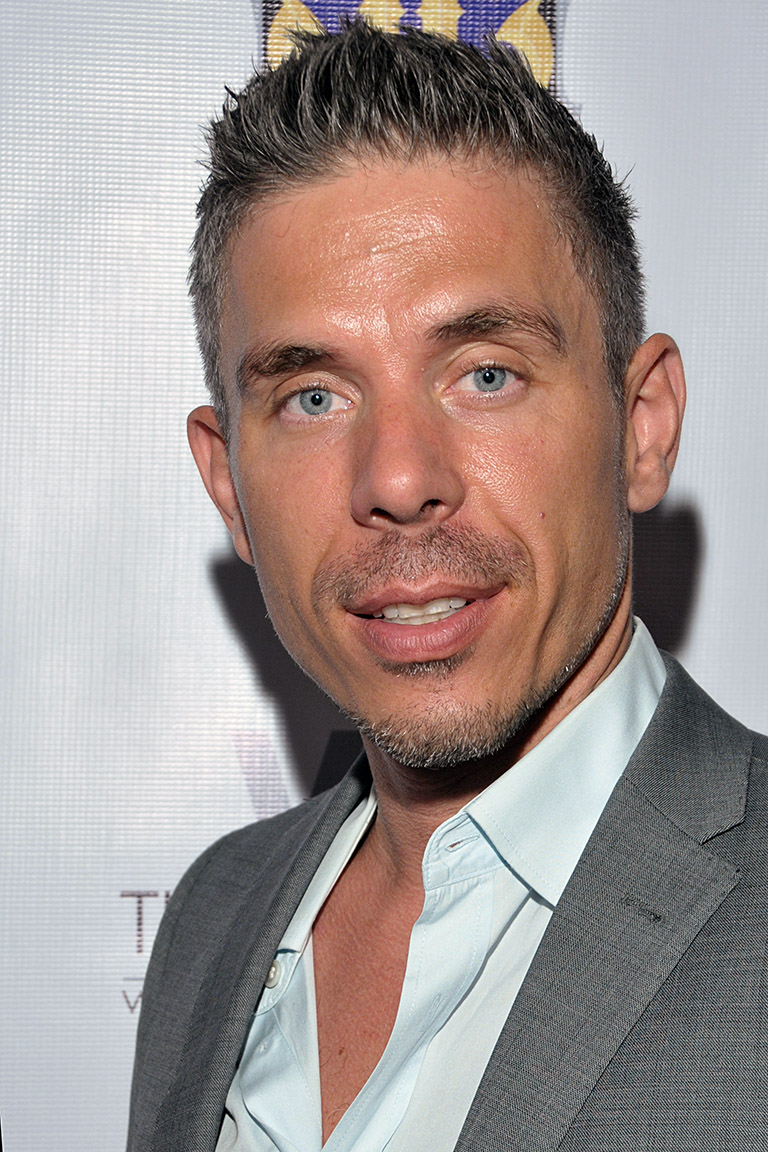
Mick Blue, winner of the 2015 AVN Male Performer of the Year Award

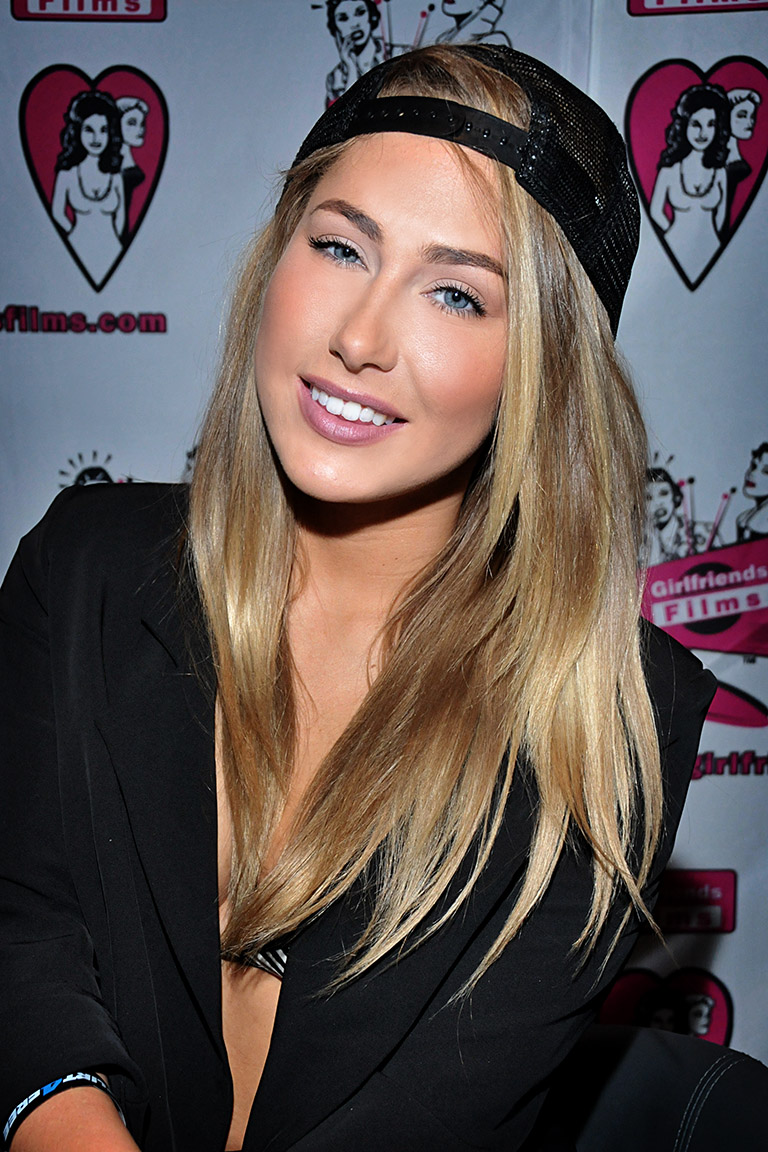
Carter Cruise, winner of the 2015 AVN Best New Starlet & Best Actress

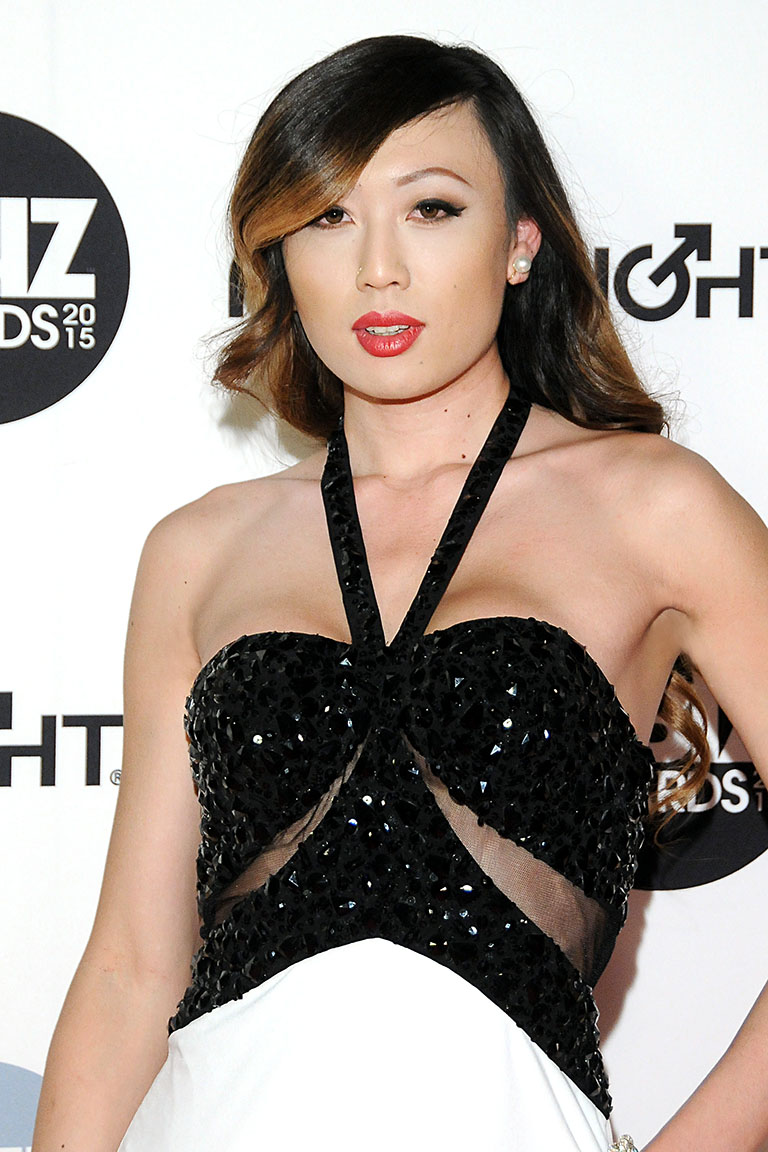
Venus Lux, winner of the 2015 AVN Transsexual Performer of the Year Award

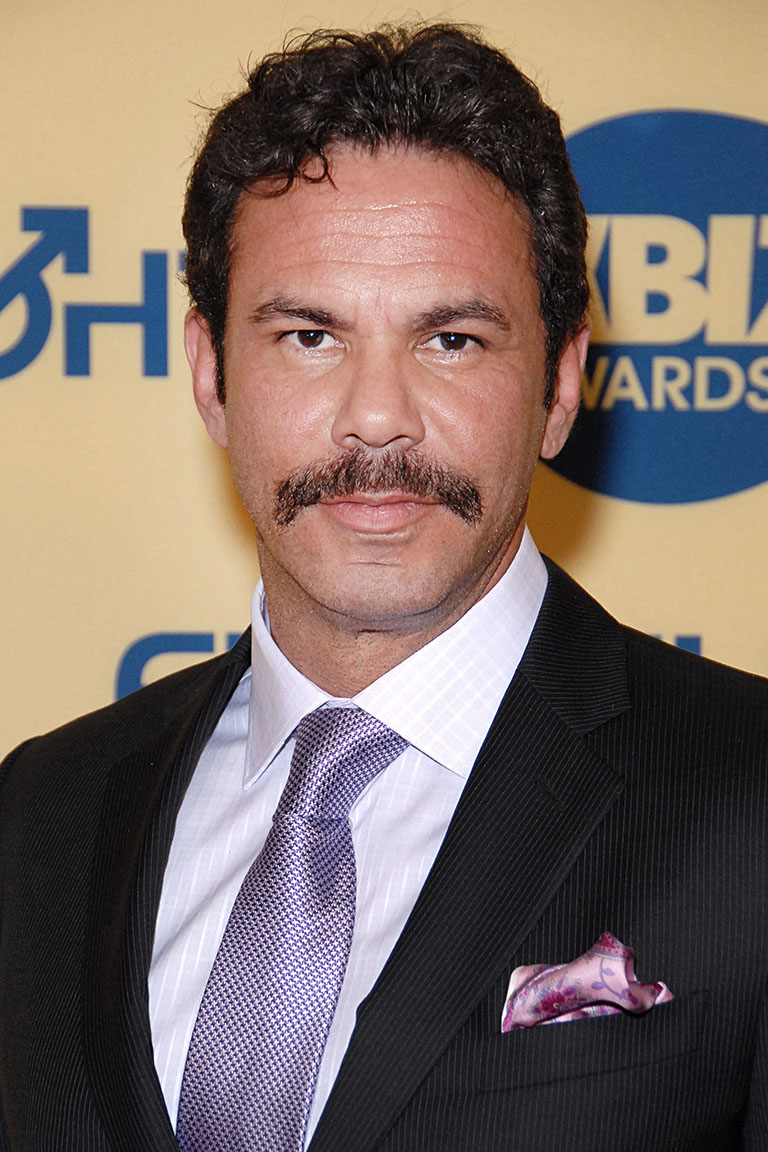
Steven St. Croix, winner of the 2015 AVN Best Actor Award

Winners of categories (listed in reverse order of presentation) announced during the awards ceremony January 24, 2015, are highlighted in boldface.

Movie of the Year	Transsexual Performer of the Year
**24 XXX: An Axel Braun Parody** (Best Parody); (Rather than nominees for this category, contenders are chosen from the winners in the "Best Release" categories such as Best Vignette Release, Best Parody Release and several others. Voting is conducted separately just prior to the awards ceremony.)	**Venus Lux**; Jonelle Brooks; Chanel Couture; James Darling; Jessy Dubai; Foxxy; Khloe Hart; Kelly Klaymour; Eva Lin; Kelli Lox; Chelsea Poe; Tyra Scott; Tiffany Starr; Vaniity; Wendy Williams
Best Drama	Best Parody
**Aftermath**; Apocalypse X; Champagne Showers; Forbidden Affairs: My Wife’s Sister; The Gardener; Holly...Would; Hollywood Babylon; The Hunted: City of Angels; Lollipop; Mother-Daughter Affair; Silhouette; These Things We Do; Voracious: Season 2; Wetwork; White Witch	**24 XXX: An Axel Braun Parody**; 9 1/2 Weeks: An Erotic XXX Parody; American Hustle XXX Porn Parody; Austin Powers XXX: A Porn Parody; Barbarella: A Kinky Parody; Cape Fear XXX; Cinderella XXX: An Axel Braun Parody; The Doctor Whore Porn Parody; E.T. XXX: A DreamZone Parody; Game of Bones: Winter Is Cumming; Not Jersey Boys XXX: A Porn Musical; Snow White XXX: An Axel Braun Parody; Spider-Man XXX 2: An Axel Braun Parody; This Ain't Boardwalk Empire XXX; The Whore of Wall Street
Best Sex Scene in a Foreign-Shot Production	Director of the Year
**Samantha Bentley, Henessy & Rocco Siffredi - Rocco's Perfect Slaves 2**; Cherry Kiss, Tarra White & Renato - Anissa Kate the Widow; Gina Gerson, Mike Angelo & Renato - Ballerina by Day Escort by Night; Tanya Tate, Roxy Mendez & Lexi Lowe - Brit School Brats 2; Jasmine Jae & Ian Scott - City of Vices; Cathy Heaven, Emma Leigh & Demitri XXX - Down on Abby: Tales From Bottomley Manor; Abbie Cat, Anna Polina, Markus Tynai & Vince Carter - Footballers’ Housewives; Julia Roca & Nacho Vidal - Fucking the World Game; Anissa Kate, Mugur & Totti - Hardcore Fever; Henessy, Mira, Coco Del Mal, Tony DeSergio & Marco Banderas - Juvenile Rampage; Alexis Crystal, Mike Angelo & Thomas Stone - Prison, Ariel Rebel & Lola Reve - Russian Institute 19: Holiday at My Parents; Dido Angel & Tommy Deer - Sex Art: Pure Pleasure; Tracy Lindsay & Iako Bell - Sexpresso; Marica Hase & Michael Chapman - XXX Fucktory: The Auditions	**Mason**; James Avalon; Brad Armstrong; Axel Braun; Stormy Daniels; James Deen; William H.; Jakodema; Jules Jordan; Ryan & Kelly Madison; Eddie Powell; Joey Silvera; B. Skow; Jacky St. James; Dana Vespoli
Female Performer of the Year	Male Performer of the Year
**Anikka Albrite**; A.J. Applegate; Adriana Chechik; Dani Daniels; Skin Diamond; Veruca James; Zoey Monroe; Maddy O'Reilly; Chanel Preston; Romi Rain; Riley Reid; Bonnie Rotten; Dahlia Sky; Jada Stevens; Jodi Taylor	**Mick Blue**; Mike Adriano; Xander Corvus; James Deen; Erik Everhard; Manuel Ferrara; Keiran Lee; Mr. Pete; Ramon Nomar; Tommy Pistol; Toni Ribas; Johnny Sins; Lexington Steele; Chris Strokes; Prince Yahshua
Best Actress	Best Anal Sex Scene
**Carter Cruise, Second Chances**; Asa Akira, Holly...Would; Anikka Albrite, Untamed Heart; Alex Chance, This Ain’t Girls XXX; Brooklyn Chase, Odd Jobs; Jessica Drake, Aftermath; Ash Hollywood, No Way Out; Kimberly Kane, The Pornographer; Maddy O'Reilly, The Sexual Liberation of Anna Lee; Penny Pax, Wetwork; Romi Rain, The Laws of Love; Bonnie Rotten, Cape Fear XXX; Samantha Saint, Cinderella XXX: An Axel Braun Parody; Stevie Shae, Apocalypse X; Jodi West, Call Me Mother	**Adriana Chechik & Manuel Ferrara - Internal Damnation 8**; Allie Haze & Lexington Steele - Allie; Jodi Taylor & James Deen - Anal Cuties; Gabriella Paltrova & Manuel Ferrara - Anal Fanatic 6; Aidra Fox & Mick Blue - Anal POV Style; Madison Ivy & Mick Blue - Brazzers 10th Anniversary; Bonnie Rotten & Steve Holmes - Climax; Kayden Kross & Manuel Ferrara - Evil Anal 22; Asa Akira & James Deen - Holly...Would; Chanel Preston & Lexington Steele - The Lexecutioner 2; Dakota Skye & James Deen - Meet Dakota; Skin Diamond & Rocco Siffredi - Rocco’s Coming in America; Maddy O'Reilly & Lexington Steele - Rump Raiders 5; Siri & Mick Blue - Stacked 2; Jada Stevens & Prince Yahshua - Up That White Ass 4
Best Actor	Best New Starlet
**Steven St. Croix, Wetwork**; Barrett Blade, Snow White: An Axel Braun Parody; James Deen, Untamed Heart; Seth Gamble, Cinderella XXX: An Axel Braun Parody; Billy Glide, Silhouette; Tommy Gunn, American Hustle XXX Porn Parody; Kurt Lockwood, 24 XXX: An Axel Braun Parody; Brendon Miller, Thor XXX: An Axel Braun Parody; Tyler Nixon, Aftermath; Logan Pierce, Shades of Kink 2; Tommy Pistol, Austin Powers XXX: A Porn Parody; Alan Stafford, These Things We Do; Jeremy Steele, The Manson Family XXX; Kyle Stone, Owner Gets Clipped; Michael Vegas, Switch	**Carter Cruise**; August Ames; Carmen Caliente; Misha Cross; Aidra Fox; Keisha Grey; Janice Griffith; Chanell Heart; Jillian Janson; Katerina Kay; Belle Knox; Ariana Marie; Scarlet Red; Samantha Rone; Dakota Skye
Niteflirt Fan Award - Best Boobs	Best Star Showcase
**Jayden Jaymes**; Other actresses in the voting were: Abigail Mac, Adrianna Luna, Alex Chance, Alexis Adams, Alexis Ford, Alison Tyler, Amy Anderssen, Angela White, Anissa Kate, April O'Neil, Ashlee Graham, August Ames, Ava Dalush, Bianca Breeze, Bonnie Rotten, Brandy Aniston, Bridgette B., Britney Amber, Brooklyn Chase, Cameron Dee, Capri Cavanni, Christie Stevens, Christy Mack, Courtney Taylor, Emily Addison, Gaia, Holly Michaels, Jelena Jensen, Jessie Lee, Juelz Ventura, Karlie Montana, Kelly Madison, Kendall Karson, Kleio Valentien, Kortney Kane, Layla Rose, Missy Martinez, Natalia Starr, Nicole Aniston, Penny Pax, Raven Rockette, Rikki Six, Samantha Saint, Sarah Jessie, Siri, Sophie Dee, Sovereign Syre, Vanessa Veracruz, Yurizan Beltran	**V for Vicki** - Vicki Chase; Allie; Angela; Anikka 2; Asa Gets Wicked; B for Bonnie; Deen vs. DeArmond; Keisha; Maddy; Meet Carter; Meet Dakota; Misha Cross: Wide Open; Reign Over Me; Riley Goes Gonzo; Romi Rain Darkside
Best Boy/Girl Sex Scene	Best Oral Sex Scene
**Aidra Fox & Ryan Madison - Jean Fucking**; Jessica Drake & Tyler Nixon [scene 8] - Aftermath; Daisy Summers & Mike Adriano - BangBros 18 #3; Brandy Aniston & Barry Scott - Brandy Aniston Is Fucked; Dana DeArmond & Michael Vegas - Haunted Hearts; Aaliyah Love & Ryan Driller - Modern Romance; Nikki Benz & Lexington Steele - Nikki Benz Jungle Fever; Carmen Caliente & Chad White - Not Jersey Boys XXX: A Porn Musical; Riley Steele & Erik Everhard - Riley Goes Gonzo; Maddy O’Reilly & Xander Corvus - The Sexual Liberation of Anna Lee; A.J. Applegate & Bruce Venture - Silhouette; Lola Foxx & Manuel Ferrara - Super Cute; Riley Reid & Ramon Nomar - Sweet Petite; Anikka Albrite & James Deen - Voracious: Season 2 Volume 1; Dakota Skye & Clover - Young & Glamorous 6	**Vicki Chase - Let Me Suck You 6**; Aidra Fox - Amateur Introductions 14; Sarah Shevon - Blowjob Face 2; Carter Cruise & Penny Pax - Cinderella XXX: An Axel Braun Parody; Riley Reid - Cum Crossfire; Veronica Avluv - Facialized; Jessie Andrews - The Gardener; Jessica Drake - Hot for Teacher; Keisha Grey - Keisha; Misha Cross - Misha Cross Wide Open; Riley Steele - Riley Goes Gonzo; Romi Rain [disc 1 scene 7] - SeXXXploitation of Romi Rain; Larkin Love - She Swallows Sperm; Jodi Taylor & Leya Falcon - Sloppy Cocksuckers; Cameron Canada - Wet Food 5
Best Supporting Actress	Best Girl/Girl Sex Scene
**Veronica Avluv, Cinderella XXX: An Axel Braun Parody**; Julia Ann, Thor XXX: An Axel Braun Parody; Carmen Caliente, Not Jersey Boys XXX A Porn Musical; Stormy Daniels, Sleeping Beauty XXX: An Axel Braun Parody; Skin Diamond, The Doctor Whore Porn Parody; Alana Evans, E.T. XXX: A DreamZone Parody; Nina Hartley, Owner Gets Clipped; Kylie Ireland, The Pornographer; Aaliyah Love, American Hustle XXX Porn Parody; Belle Noire, The Long Hard Ride; Chanel Preston, Cape Fear XXX; Jessa Rhodes, Second Chances; Claire Robbins, 24 XXX: An Axel Braun Parody; Siri, Sweetness and Light; Aiden Starr, Pornocopia	**Gabriella Paltrova & Remy LaCroix - Gabi Gets Girls**; Penny Pax & Alektra Blue - 24 XXX: An Axel Braun Parody; Bonnie Rotten & Jesse Jane - 4Ever; Stevie Shae & Verónica Rodríguez - Apocalypse X; Jodi West & Callie Calypso - Call Me Mother; Casey Calvert & Jada Stevens - Dirty Panties 2; Lexi Belle & Raven Rockette - Lexi Belle Loves Girls; Kaylani Lei & Abigail Mac - The Masterpiece; Dana DeArmond & Adriana Chechik - A Mother Daughter Thing; Aidra Fox & Cassie Laine - Secret Life of a Lesbian; Aaliyah Love & Ryan Ryans - There's Only One Ryan Ryans; Jiz Lee & Sovereign Syre - Tombois 2; Stoya & Lea Lexis - Voracious: Season 2 Volume 1, John Stagliano/Evil Angel; Dani Daniels & Capri Cavanni - The Whore of Wall Street; Veruca James & Prinzzess Felicity Jade - Women Seeking Women 100

=== Additional award winners ===
The following is the list of remaining award categories, which were presented apart from the actual awards ceremony.

**CONTENT CATEGORIES**

- All-Girl Performer of the Year: Sinn Sage
- BBW Performer of the Year: April Flores
- Best All-Girl Group Sex Scene: Anikka Albrite, Dani Daniels & Karlie Montana, Anikka 2
- Best All-Girl Release: Alexis & Asa, and Women Seeking Women 100 (tie)
- Best All-Girl Series: Girls Kissing Girls
- Best Amateur Release: Dare Dorm 20
- Best Amateur/Pro-Am Series: Brand New Faces
- Best Anal Release: Ass Worship 15
- Best Anal Series: Wet Asses
- Best Art Direction: Apocalypse X
- Best BDSM Release: Brandy Aniston Is Fucked
- Best Big Bust Release: Bra Busters 5
- Best Big Butt Release: Wet Asses 4
- Best Celebrity Sex Tape: Tila Tequila 2: Backdoored & Squirting
- Best Cinematography: Billy Visual & Jakodema
- Best Comedy: Bikini Babes Are SharkBait
- Best Continuing Series: Oil Overload
- Best Director – Feature: Brad Armstrong, Aftermath
- Best Director – Foreign Feature: Herve Bodilis, Anissa Kate the Widow
- Best Director – Foreign Non-Feature: Gazzman, Young Harlots: Slutty Delinquents
- Best Director – Non-Feature: Mason, Allie
- Best Director – Parody: Axel Braun, 24 XXX: An Axel Braun Parody
- Best Double Penetration Sex Scene: Anikka Albrite, Mick Blue & Erik Everhard, Anikka 2
- Best Editing: Joey Pulgadas, Apocalypse X
- Best Ethnic Release: Latinas on Fire
- Best Ethnic/Interracial Series: Lex Turns Evil
- Best Foreign Feature: Anissa Kate the Widow
- Best Foreign Non-Feature: Anissa and Lola at Nurses’ School
- Best Group Sex Scene: A.J. Applegate, John Strong, Erik Everhard, Mr. Pete, Mick Blue, Ramón Nomar, James Deen & Jon Jon, Gangbang Me
- Best Interracial Release: Dani Daniels Deeper
- Best Makeup: Cammy Ellis, Anal Candy Disco Chicks
- Best Male Newcomer: Rob Piper
- Best Marketing Campaign – Company Image: Forbidden Fruits Films
- Best Marketing Campaign – Individual Project: Not Jersey Boys XXX: A Porn Musical, X-Play/Pulse
- Best MILF Release: Dirty Rotten Mother Fuckers 7
- Best Non-Feature: Flesh Hunter 12
- Best Non-Sex Performance: Christian Mann, Voracious: Season 2
- Best New Imprint: Airerose Entertainment
- Best New Series: Tabu Tales
- Best Older Woman/Younger Girl Release: Cougars, Kittens & Cock 3
- Best Oral Release: Wet Food 5
- Best Orgy/Gangbang Release: Gangbang Me
- Best POV Release: Lex’s Point of View
- Best POV Sex Scene: Phoenix Marie & Lexington Steele, Lex’s Point of View
- Best Pro-Am Release: Amateur POV Auditions 6
- Best Romance Movie: Second Chances
- Best Screenplay: Brad Armstrong, Aftermath
- Best Screenplay – Parody: Axel Braun & Eli Cross, 24 XXX: An Axel Braun Parody
- Best Solo/Tease Performance: Anikka Albrite, Dani Daniels & Karlie Montana, Anikka 2

**Content (ctd.)**

- Best Soundtrack: Not Jersey Boys XXX: A Porn Musical
- Best Special Effects: Austin Powers XXX: A Porn Parody
- Best Specialty Release – Other Genre: Bonnie Rotten Is Squirtwoman
- Best Specialty Series – Other Genre: Fetish Fanatic
- Best Supporting Actor: Xander Corvus, Holly...Would
- Best Taboo Relations Movie: Keep It in the Family
- Best Transsexual Release: TS Girlfriend Experience 3
- Best Transsexual Series: America’s Next Top Tranny
- Best Transsexual Sex Scene: Venus Lux & Dana Vespoli: TS, I Love You
- Best Three-Way Sex Scene – Boy/Boy/Girl: Allie Haze, Ramón Nomar & Mick Blue, Allie
- Best Three-Way Sex Scene – Girl/Girl/Boy: Dani Daniels, Anikka Albrite & Rob Piper, Dani Daniels Deeper
- Best Vignette Release: Erotico
- Best Young Girl Release: Super Cute
- Clever Title of the Year: 12 Inches a Slave
- Female Foreign Performer of the Year: Anissa Kate
- Mainstream Star of the Year: James Deen
- Male Foreign Performer of the Year: Rocco Siffredi
- MILF Performer of the Year: India Summer
- Most Outrageous Sex Scene: Adriana Chechik, Erik Everhard, James Deen & Mick Blue in “Two’s Company, Three’s a Crowd,” from Gangbang Me

**Content (ctd.) - Fan Vote Awards**

- Cutest Newcomer: August Ames
- Favorite Female Porn Star: Riley Steele
- Favorite Male Porn Star: James Deen
- Favorite Studio: Brazzers
- Favorite Web Cam Girl: Abella Anderson
- Hottest Ass: Alexis Texas
- Hottest MILF: Julia Ann
- Kinkiest Performer: Bonnie Rotten
- Social Media Star: Dani Daniels

**WEB & TECHNOLOGY**

- Best Affiliate Program: Gamma Entertainment
- Best Alternative Website: Clips4Sale.com
- Best Dating Website: AshleyMadison.com
- Best Glamour Website: SexArt.com
- Best Live Chat Website: ImLive.com
- Best Membership Website: Brazzers.com
- Best Porn Star Website: JoannaAngel.com
- Best Solo Girl Website: AaliyahLove.com
- Best Web Director: Lee Roy Myers

**PLEASURE PRODUCTS**

- Best Condom Manufacturer: Lifestyles
- Best Enhancement Manufacturer: Evolved Novelties
- Best Fetish Manufacturer: CB-X
- Best Lingerie or Apparel Manufacturer: Coquette
- Best Lubricant Manufacturer: Wet International
- Best Pleasure Product Manufacturer – Small: njoy
- Best Pleasure Product Manufacturer – Medium: Impulse Novelties
- Best Pleasure Product Manufacturer – Large: California Exotic Novelties
- Best Product Line for Men: Fleshlight Girls
- Best Product Line for Women: The Girls

**RETAIL & DISTRIBUTION**

- Best Boutique: The Stockroom/Syren (Los Angeles)
- Best Retail Chain – Small: The Pleasure Chest
- Best Retail Chain – Large: Castle Megastore
- Best Web Retail Store: AdamAndEve.com

=== Honorary AVN Awards ===
==== Hall of Fame ====
On December 24, 2014 , the AVN Hall of Fame class of 2015 was announced with 27 inductees added. Inductees were honored at an industry cocktail party at the AVN Adult Entertainment Expo three days prior to the awards show.

The AVN Hall of Fame inductees for 2015 are as follows:

- Founders Branch: Al Goldstein, Marc Dorcel
- Video Branch: Eli Cross, Alana Evans, Billy Glide, Porno Dan Leal, Kaylani Lei, Joanna Jet, Kelly Madison, Andre Madness, Craven Moorehead, Wesley Pipes, RayVeness, Will Ryder, Karen Summer, Talon, Tim Von Swine
- Executive Branch: Marci Hirsch, Bonnie Kail, Howard Levine, Dan O’Connell
- Pleasure Products Branch: Joe Bolstad, Pavle Sedic, Ari Suss
- Internet Branch: Steve Lightspeed, Lensman, Botto Brothers

=== Films with multiple nominations ===
The following 15 films received 10 or more nominations:

Nominations	Film
22	Aftermath
20	Orgy Initiation of Lola
16	Apocalypse X
16	Holly... Would
14	Gangbang Me
13	Cinderella XXX: An Axel Braun Parody
13	Not Jersey Boys XXX: A Porn Musical
12	Voracious: Season Two, Volume One
12	Barbarella: A Kinky Parody
12	Private Lives
11	Allie
10	24 XXX: An Axel Braun Parody
10	American Hustle XXX: A Parody
10	Orgy Masters 4

=== Individuals with multiple nominations ===
The following 17 performers and directors received eight or more nominations:

Nominations	Film
20	Ramón Nomar
19	James Deen
12	Mick Blue
12	Manuel Ferrara
11	Annika Albrite
11	Erik Everhard
10	Maddy O'Reilly
9	Axel Braun
9	Dani Daniels
9	Skin Diamond
9	Bonnie Rotten
8	Asa Akira
8	Mr. Pete
8	Tommy Pistol
8	Romi Rain
8	Toni Ribas
8	Lexington Steele

== Presenters and Performers ==
The following individuals were presenters or performers during the awards ceremony:

=== Presenters ===
Presenters
- Actresses Brooklyn Chase, August Ames, Scarlet Red, Adriana Chechik, A.J. Applegate, Abigail Mac, Nadia Styles, Asa Akira, Mia Malkova, Karmen Karma, Aiden Starr, Christie Stevens, Jessica Drake, Veruca James, Gabriella Paltrova, Allie Haze, Jesse Jane, Jodi West, Kelly des Ch'tis, Farrah Abraham, Skin Diamond, Maddy O'Reilly, Brandy Aniston, Amber Lynn, Sunny Megatron
- A bevy of Penthouse Pets: Lexi Belle, Misty Stone, Ryan Ryans, Kenna James, Layla Sin
- Actors Ron Jeremy, Ryan Driller, Tommy Gunn, Lexington Steele, Michael Vegas

=== Trophy girls ===
Trophy girls
- Carmen Caliente
- Jillian Janson

=== Performers ===
Performers

Name(s)	Role	Performed
DJ Illest Rich	Performer	Disc jockey
Rae Sremmurd	Performer	Hip-hop duo
Hustler Club dancers	Performer	Hip-hop dancers
Danielle Stewart	Co-Host	Comedian
Tommy Pistol	Host	Song-and-dance

== Ceremony information ==
In order to be eligible for the 2015 award nomination, a movie or product had to be released in accordance with the following guidelines:

- To be considered, a title must have been released between October 8, 2013, and September 30, 2014, either via VOD (video on demand) or DVD
- Titles released on DVD must fit AVN's traditional distribution requirements of being stocked with five wholesale distributors and/or 100 retail outlets
- Titles released on VOD must have been made available during the eligibility period for VOD download and/or streaming through at least two (2) major, for-pay VOD providers, defined as ones carrying movies from at least 100 active labels/studios
- The title must have clearly marked post dates falling within the eligibility period across all qualifying VOD platforms carrying it

On May 12, 2014, it was announced that Alexis Texas and Tommy Pistol were to be the co-hosts for the ceremonies. This was the first time in twenty years that a male performer was a host at the awards. Previously, AVN Hall of Fame inductee Steven St. Croix was a host in 1995, preceded by Randy West, Tom Byron and Rick Savage. On November 25, 2014, comedian and actress Danielle Stewart was added to the team as the comedic co-host for the show.

=== Changes to awards categories ===
For 2015, AVN decided "to expand its longstanding eligibility requirements ... to include ones distributed solely via video-on-demand."

AVN also announced, "Some redundancies were eliminated and categories that were too similar were in some cases merged together to create a tight list of 108 categories."

Additionally, a new "surprise category" was announced, Best Taboo Relations Movie.

=== Controversies ===
The Internet Adult Film Database staff believes it has found a couple of mistakes in the nomination list issued by AVN: "In the Best POV Sex Scene category, the editors got their volume numbers jumbled – the scene between Summer Brielle and Kevin Moore appeared in Tease Me POV, not Tease Me POV 2. And performers got crossed with the Best Sex Scene in a Foreign-Shot Production category. The scene from Russian Institute: Lesson 19: Holidays at My Parents isn’t between Ariel Rebel and Lola Reve, it’s between Ariel Rebel and Cayenne Klein."

=== Reception and review ===
Some media outlets were impressed by the show. The International Business Times said, "The evening also was filled with surprisingly entertaining repartee between presenters, funny pre-filmed skits and an overall sense of irony about the event." It also noted, "One significant way the AVN awards differs from the Oscars is in the brevity of the acceptance speeches. Most winners thanked agents and other performers in less than 30 seconds before leaving the stage. A couple gave nods to their mothers."

CraveOnline Canada said, "The AVN Awards are as good a time to demand this call to arms as any. Pornography is a popular, widespread artistic genre – whatever you may or may not think of it – and it warrants more thoughtful consideration than whether or not it works as a product, or whether or not it is empowering us or destroying our values."

== In Memoriam ==
As the show was beginning, AVN used a video segment to pay a tribute to adult-industry personalities who had died since the 2014 awards show:

- Golden-age hall of fame actress Gloria Leonard
- Evil Angel general manager Christian Mann
- Hot Vidéo founder Franck Vardon
- Tony Lovett, a former editor-in-chief of three different AVN Media Network publications
- Something Weird Video founder Mike Vraney
- Photographer Bunny Yeager
- and Toby Dammit, Cameron Fox, Billy Glide, Heather Joy, Christine Kessler, Armando Malatesta, Jake Malone, Phil Marshak, Shoosh, Paul Snell, Southern Somer and Jim Steel

== See also ==
- AVN Awards
- AVN Award for Male Performer of the Year
- AVN Female Performer of the Year Award
- AVN Award for Male Foreign Performer of the Year
- List of members of the AVN Hall of Fame
- 87th Academy Awards
