= 31st AVN Awards =

US adult industry award ceremony in 2014

- Date: January 18, 2014
- Site: The Joint; Hard Rock Hotel and Casino, Paradise, Nevada
- Hosted by: Chanel Preston; Samantha Saint; Rebekah Kochan
- Preshow hosts: Dana DeArmond; Nicole Aniston

Highlights
- Best Picture: Underworld
- Most awards: Underworld (9)
- Most nominations: Underworld (17)

Television coverage
- Network: Showtime

31st AVN Awards was an event during which Adult Video News (AVN) presented its annual AVN Awards to honor the best pornographic movies and adult entertainment products of 2013.

The ceremony was held January 18, 2014, at The Joint in the Hard Rock Hotel and Casino, Paradise, Nevada. Movies or products released between October 1, 2012, and October 7, 2013, were eligible. Comedian/actress Rebekah Kochan and adult movie actresses Chanel Preston, who was co-winner of "Most Outrageous Sex Scene", and Samantha Saint hosted the AVN Awards. The awards show was held immediately after the Adult Entertainment Expo at the same venue.

Underworld took top honors as Movie of the Year, also winning Best Drama and seven other awards, including a directing award for Brad Armstrong.

Tommy Pistol was named Best Actor for his performance as Ashley J. Williams in adult horror film Evil Head. The coveted AVN Female Performer of the Year Award and AVN Best New Starlet Award went to Bonnie Rotten and Mia Malkova respectively. Axel Braun won Director of the Year for a record fourth consecutive time and Manuel Ferrara was awarded a record fifth Male Performer of the Year award. The new category of BBW Performer of the Year was won by April Flores. The Clever Title of the Year award was won by Seymore Butts for Cirque du Hole-A.

== Winners and nominees ==
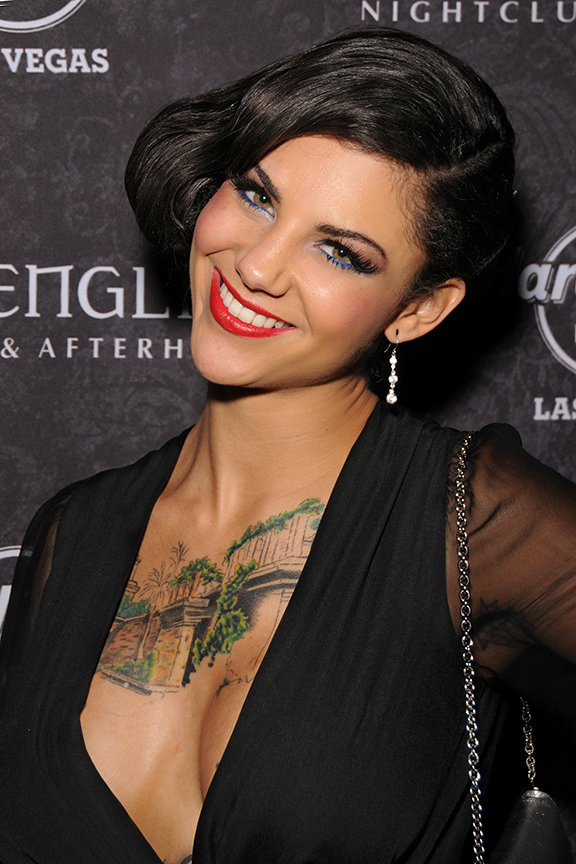
Bonnie Rotten, winner of the 2014 AVN Female Performer of the Year Award

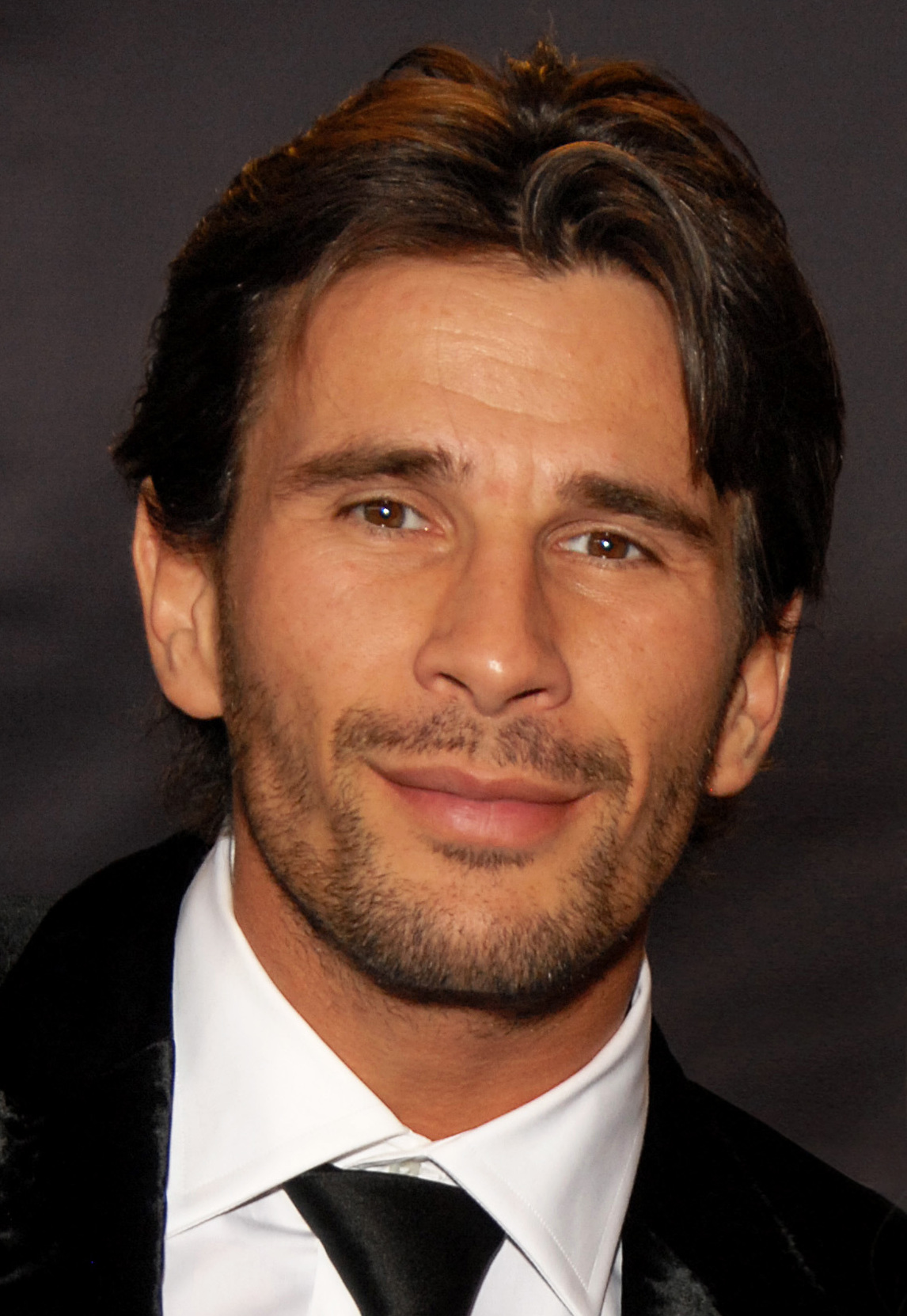
Manuel Ferrara, winner of the 2014 Male Performer of the Year

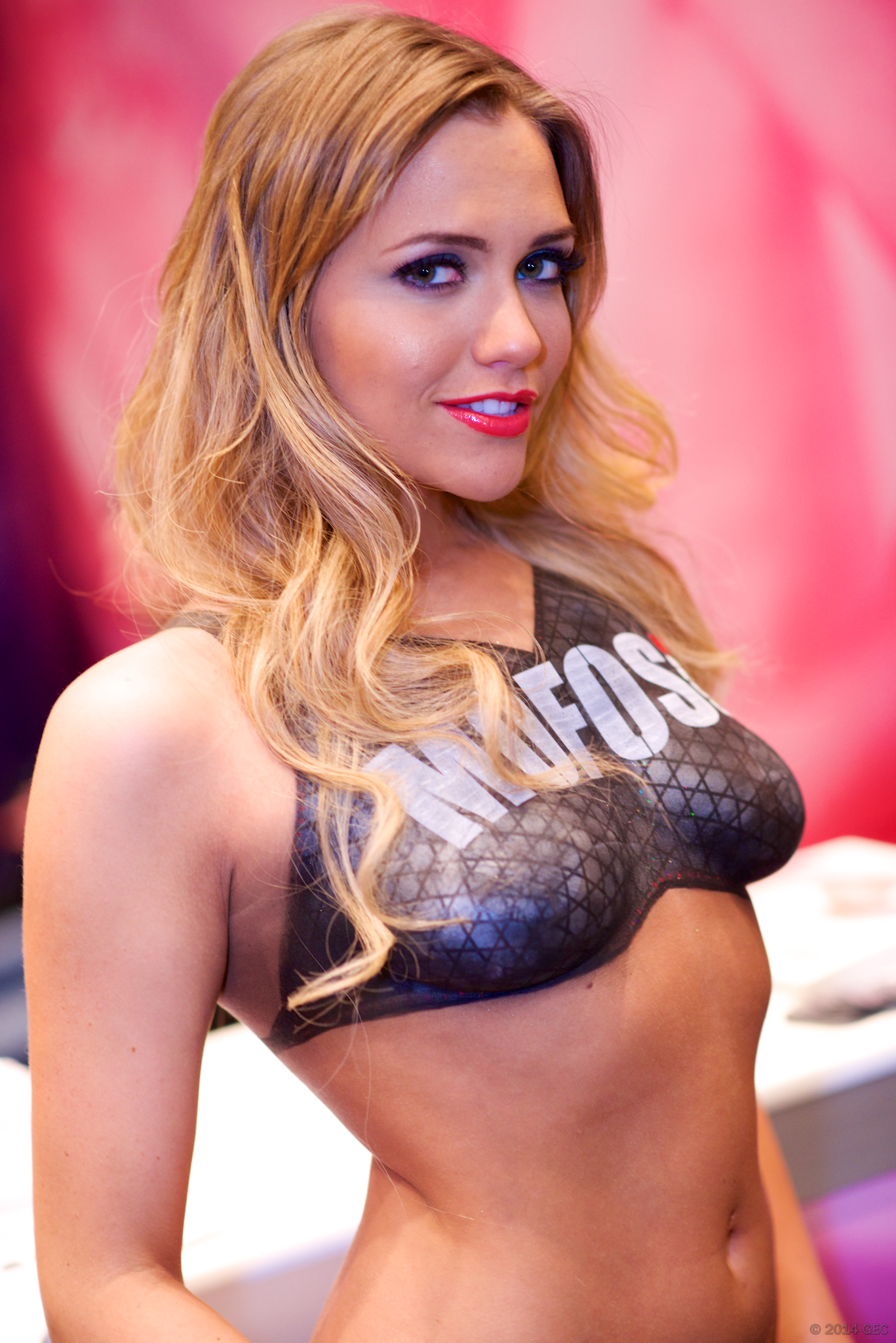
Mia Malkova, winner of the 2014 Best New Starlet

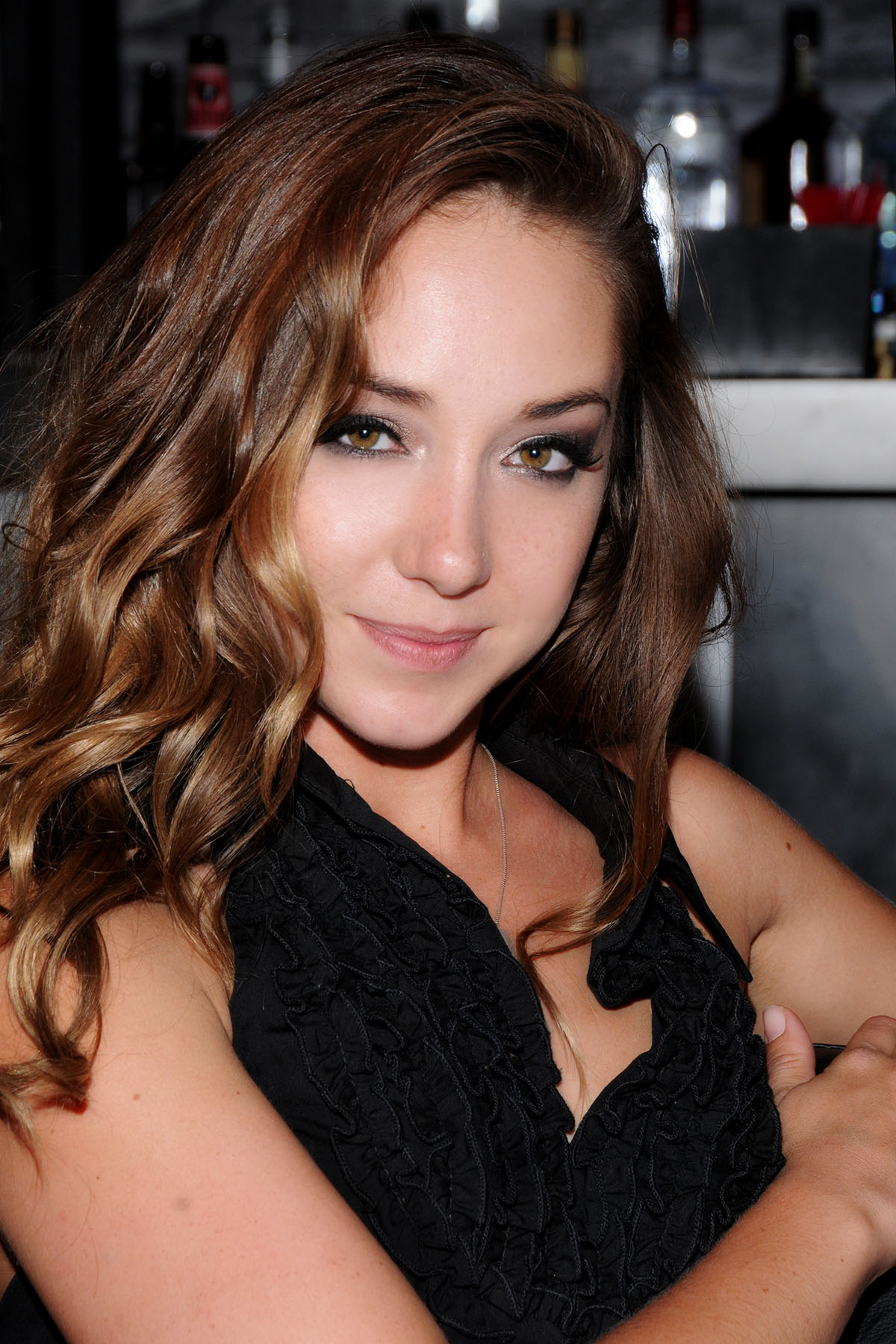
Remy LaCroix, winner of the 2014 Best Actress

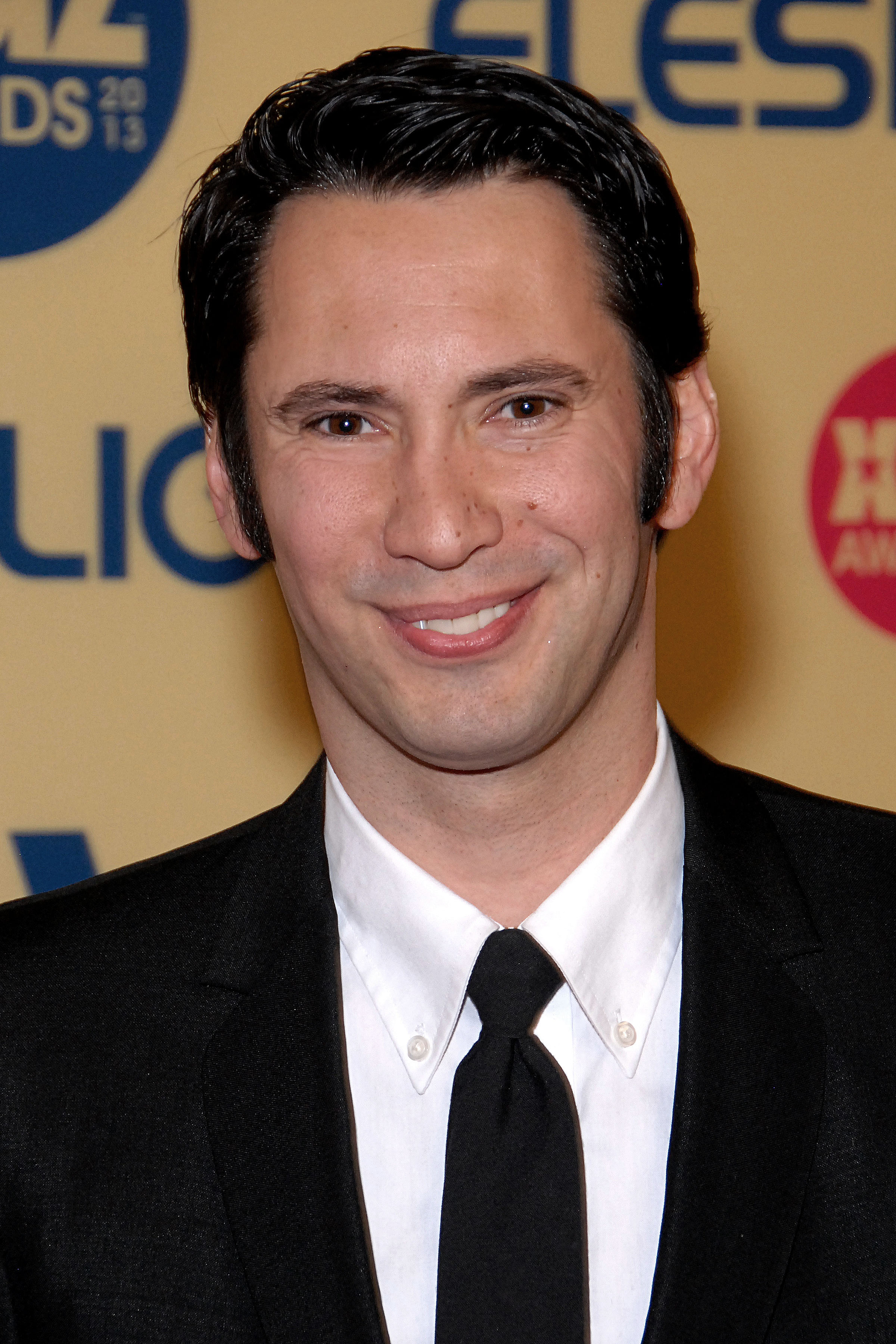
Tommy Pistol, Best Actor winner

The categories for the 31st AVN Awards were released on September 20, 2013 and the finalists were announced on November 15, 2013.

=== Major awards ===
Winners of categories announced during the awards ceremony January 18, 2014, are highlighted in boldface.

Movie of the Year	Female Performer of the Year
**Underworld (Best Drama)**; (Rather than nominees for this category, contenders are chosen from the winners in the "Best Release" categories such as Best Gonzo Release, Best Vignette and several others. Voting is conducted separately just prior to the awards ceremony.)	**Bonnie Rotten**; Asa Akira; Anikka Albrite; Bailey Blue; Dani Daniels; Dana DeArmond; Skin Diamond; Allie Haze; Remy LaCroix; Maddy O'Reilly; Chanel Preston; Riley Reid; Samantha Saint; Sheena Shaw; Jada Stevens
Male Performer of the Year	Transsexual Performer of the Year
**Manuel Ferrara**; Mick Blue; Xander Corvus; James Deen; Ryan Driller; Erik Everhard; Keiran Lee; Ryan Madison; Mandingo; Ramón Nomar; Tommy Pistol; Toni Ribas; Lexington Steele; Christian XXX; Prince Yahshua	**Eva Lin**; Buck Angel; Natassia Dreams; Danika Dreamz; Jesse Flores; Jessica Fox; Foxxy; Kelli Lox; Venus Lux; Jane Marie; Carmen Moore; Tiffany Starr; Wendy Summers; Sarina Valentina; Vaniity
Director of the Year	Best New Starlet
**Axel Braun**; Joanna Angel; Brad Armstrong; James Avalon; Barrett Blade; William H.; Jules Jordan; Mason; Jonathan Morgan; Eddie Powell; Jim Powers; Will Ryder; Joey Silvera; B. Skow; Dana Vespoli	**Mia Malkova**; A. J. Applegate; Casey Calvert; Teal Conrad; Dillion Harper; Melody Jordan; Kennedy Leigh; Christy Mack; Zoey Monroe; Raven Rockette; Jessa Rhodes; Rikki Sixx; Cindy Starfall; Natalia Starr; Jodi Taylor
Best Actor	Best Actress
**Tommy Pistol - Evil Head**; Richie Calhoun - The Submission of Emma Marx; Dale DaBone - Iron Man XXX: An Axel Braun Parody; Mark Davis - Nobody’s Daughter; James Deen - Watch Over Me; Ryan Driller - Man of Steel XXX: An Axel Braun Parody; Seth Gamble - Just In Beaver Fever; Alec Knight - Breaking Bad XXX: A Sweet Mess Films Parody; Keiran Lee - To Live and Fuck in L.A.; Kurt Lockwood - What Do You Want Me to Say?; Brendon Miller - Divorcees; Kris Slater - Unfaithful; Steven St. Croix - Truth Be Told; Evan Stone - Adventures in Eden; Michael Vegas - Rebound	**Remy LaCroix - The Temptation of Eve (New Sensations Erotic Stories)**; Anikka Albrite - OMG... It’s the Leaving Las Vegas XXX Parody; Lexi Belle - Meant to Be; Alektra Blue - Getting Schooled; Jessica Drake - Sexpionage: The Drake Chronicles; Tara Lynn Foxx - This Ain’t Homeland XXX; Allie Haze - Clerks XXX: A Porn Parody; Jesse Jane - Code of Honor; Sunny Lane - The Stripper 2; Brooklyn Lee - The New Behind the Green Door; Adrianna Luna - The Lone Ranger XXX: An Extreme Comixxx Parody; Maddy O'Reilly - Not The Wizard of Oz XXX; Penny Pax - The Submission of Emma Marx; Raven Rockette - Gia: Lesbian Supermodel; Jennifer White - The Stripper
Best BDSM Movie	Best Drama
**The Submission of Emma Marx (New Sensations Erotic Stories)**; 50 Shades of Dylan Ryan; Bound by Desire 2: Collared and Kept Well; Cheerleaders in Bondage; Dark Temptations; Get My Belt; Hogtied; Home Invasion; The House of Sin; Obedience School; The Perfect Secretary 3: New Recruit; Sadistic Mother-in-Law 2; Shades of Kink; S.O.S. Strap-on Sluts 3; Whipped Ass	**Underworld**; Beyond Fucked: A Zombie Odyssey; Bikini Outlaws; Code of Honor; Daddy’s Girls; Devil on a Chain; Forsaken; The New Behind the Green Door; Nobody's Daughter; Peep Show; The Perfect Secretary 3: New Recruit; The Stripper; To Live and Fuck in L.A.; Truth Be Told; Watch Over Me
Best Parody - Comedy	Best Parody - Drama
**Grease XXX: A Parody (Adam & Eve Pictures)**; Can't Be Martin It's a XXX Parody; Clerks XXX: A Porn Parody; Evil Head; Just In Beaver Fever; The Karate Kid XXX: A DreamZone Parody; Laverne & Shirley XXX: A DreamZone Parody; Not South Park XXX; Not The Wizard of Oz XXX; Official Next Friday Parody; Orgy University; This Ain't Homeland XXX; This Ain't Star Trek 3 XXX 3D; The Walking Dead: A Hardcore Parody; Welcome Back Kotter XXX: A DreamZone Parody	**Man of Steel XXX: An Axel Braun Parody (VividXXXSuperheroes)**; Barb Wire XXX: A DreamZone Parody; Breaking Bad XXX: A Sweet Mess Films Parody; Gia: Lesbian Supermodel; Iron Man XXX: An Axel Braun Parody; The Lone Ranger XXX: An Extreme Comixxx Parody; OMG ... It's the Dirty Dancing XXX Parody; OMG ... It's the Ghost XXX Parody; OMG ... It's the Leaving Las Vegas XXX Parody; Paranormal Activity: A Hardcore Parody; She-Hulk XXX: An Axel Braun Parody; Superman vs. Spider-Man: An Axel Braun Parody; This Ain’t Die Hard XXX 3D; Wolverine XXX: An Axel Braun Parody; The XXX Adventures of Hawkman & Hawkgirl
Best Star Showcase	Best Romance Release
**Anikka**; All About Allie; Cayenne Loves Rocco; I Am Christy Mack; I'm Your Bitch: Lyen; The Insatiable Miss Alexis Texas; Joanna Angel: Kinky Fantasies; Lisa Ann: Can't Say No; Mia; Remy 2; Samantha Saint Is Completely Wicked; Savannah’s Secret; SeXXXploitation of Dani Daniels; Skin; Ultimate Fuck Toy: Kennedy Leigh	**The Temptation of Eve (New Sensations Erotic Stories)**; Bitter Sweet; Broken Hearts; Change of Heart; First Crush; Getting Schooled; Harvest Moon; If You Only Knew; La Boutique; Maid for Love; Meant to Be; Paint; Secret Admirer; The Submission of Emma Marx; What Do You Want Me To Say?
Best Anal Sex Scene	Best Oral Sex Scene
**Anikka Albrite & Mick Blue - Anikka (O.L Entertainment/Mile High)**; Farrah Abraham & James Deen - Farrah Superstar: Backdoor Teen Mom; Asa Akira & Ramón Nomar - Asian Bombshells; Brandy Aniston & Richie Calhoun - The New Behind the Green Door; Lisa Ann & Jules Jordan - Deep Anal Drilling 4; Lexi Belle & Mick Blue - Big Wet Asses 22; Dana DeArmond & James Deen - What an Asshole; Skin Diamond & L. T. - Skin; Katja Kassin & Mike Adriano - Anal Motherfuckers; Remy LaCroix & Manuel Ferrara - Rump Raiders; Penny Pax & Richie Calhoun - The Submission of Emma Marx; Chanel Preston & Mandingo - Mandingo Massacre 8; Bonnie Rotten & Ramón Nomar - Evil Anal 19; Sheena Shaw & Manuel Ferrara - Evil Anal 17; Stoya & James Deen - Code of Honor	**Skin Diamond - Skin [scene 1]**; Julia Ann - Underworld; Anikka Albrite & Riley Reid - American Cocksucking Sluts 3; Joanna Angel - Joanna Angel: Orgasm Addict [scene 5]; Vicki Chase - Jules Jordan: Feeding Frenzy 11; Tara Lynn Foxx - This Ain't Homeland XXX; Remy LaCroix - Facial Overload 3; Larkin Love - Suck Balls 3; Mia Malkova - Swallow This 30; Maddy O'Reilly, Belle Noire & Rilynn Rae - 3 on Their Knees; Bonnie Rotten - Facial Overload 3; Katie St. Ives - Sperm Receptacles 6; Sheena Shaw - Massive Facials 6; Christie Stevens & Jayden Lee - American Cocksucking Sluts 3; Heather Vahn - Gag Reflex
Best Boy/Girl Sex Scene	Best Sex Scene in a Foreign-Shot Production
**Riley Reid & Mandingo - Mandingo Massacre 6 (Jules Jordan Video)**; Anikka Albrite & Manuel Ferrara - Top Bottoms; Bailey Blue & Xander Corvus - The Temptation of Eve; Casey Calvert & Ryan Madison - Dark Perversions 2; Adriana Chechik & Bruce Venture - The Innocence of Youth 5; Dani Daniels & James Deen - Skin Tight; Skin Diamond & Prince Yahshua - Deep Pussy; Dillion Harper & Mick Blue - Wet Dream; Ash Hollywood & Michael Vegas - Forsaken; Kimberly Kane & Alec Knight - Breaking Bad XXX: A Sweet Mess Films Parody; Kennedy Leigh & James Deen - Ultimate Fuck Toy: Kennedy Leigh; Christy Mack & Toni Ribas - Planting Seeds 3; Mia Malkova & Manuel Ferrara - Cuties 4; Kirsten Price & Keiran Lee - To Live and Fuck in L.A. [scene 1]; Andy San Dimas & Tommy Gunn - Wolverine: An Axel Braun Parody	**Aleska Diamond, Anna Polina, Anissa Kate, Angel Piaff, Rita, Tarra White & Mike Angelo - The Ingenuous**; Aliz, Kristine Crystallis & Toni Ribas - Adventures on the Lust Boat 4; Blanche Bradburry, Samia Duarte & Rocco Siffredi - Rocco’s Perfect Slaves; Claire Castel, Clark & Thomas Stone - Claire Castel: The Chambermaid; Abbie Cat, Lyen Parker & Rocco Siffredi - XXX Fucktory; Penelope Crunch, Franceska Jaimes & Nacho Vidal - Fuck Yeeaaah!!!!; Angel Dark & Leny Ewil - Eurobabes Jizz Explosion; Allie Haze, Krissy Lynn, Fabine, Suzana Rhios, Roge, Bad Boy, Michael Vegas & Tyler Nixon - Adventures in Eden; Henessy, Marica Hase & Ian Scott - Fashionable Fuckers; Cayenne Klein, David Perry, Sabby, Markus Dupree & Rocco Sardo - Hose Monster 5; Shana Lane, Mike Angelo, Michael Cheritto & Titof - My Sister and Me; Orgy Scene - 19th Birthday Present: The Greatest Orgy; Anna Polina, Nasta Zya & JPX - Russian Institute 18: The Headmistress; Savannah Secret & Steve Holmes - Savanna’s Secret; Tarra White, Cayenne Klein, Mike Chapman, Ian Scott & Marcus - Cayenne Loves Rocco
Best Girl-Girl Sex Scene	The Fan Awards - Hottest Ass
**Riley Reid & Remy LaCroix - Girl Fever**; Asa Akira & Celeste Star - Asa Loves Girls; Casey Calvert & India Summer - Teach Me 3; Lily Carter & Molly Bennett - Meow! 3; Dana DeArmond & Veruca James - Paint; Skin Diamond & Kleio Valentien - The Walking Dead: A Hardcore Parody; Jessica Drake & Capri Cavanni - Underworld; Gracie Glam & Gia Steel - Lesbian Crime Stories; Ash Hollywood & Aiden Ashley - Girls Will Be Boys; Tessa Lane & Ana Foxxx - Four Rooms: Los Angeles; Karlie Montana & Brett Rossi - Girl Squared; Mia Malkova & Jessie Andrews - Girl Crush 3; Bonnie Rotten & Nikki Hearts - Beyond Fucked: A Zombie Odyssey; Andy San Dimas & Chanel Preston - Bitchcraft 9	**Alexis Texas**; Other actresses in the voting were: Anikka Albrite, Serena Ali, A.J. Applegate, Aria Arial, Bridgette B., Briella Bounce, Amy Brooke, Mischa Brooks, Julie Cash, Felicia Clover, Dani Daniels, Sophie Dee, Nikki Delano, Kelly Divine, Alexis Ford, Tara Lynn Foxx, Gracie Glam, Mia Gold, Allie Haze, Jayden James, Sara Jay, Karmen Karma, Katja Kassin, London Keyes, Kiera King, Remy LaCroix, Lea Lexis, Lia Lor, Kendra Lust, Krissy Lynn, Mia Malkova, Missy Martinez, Maserati, Jynx Maze, Holly Michaels, Karlie Montana, Jade Nacole, Maddy O'Reilly, Anita Peida, Kristina Rose, Katie St. Ives, Sheena Shaw, Siri, Sarah Shevon, Rachel Starr, Gia Steel, Jada Stevens, Jodi Taylor & Sarah Vandella

=== Additional Award Winners ===
These awards were not presented during the awards ceremony itself but were announced before or after the show. In addition, Best 3D Release, Best Classic Release and Best Selling Title of the Year were on the list of award categories but were not presented in 2014.

**Video Categories**

- Best All-Girl Group Sex Scene: Gracie Glam, Mia Malkova & Raven Rockette (Meow! 3)
- Best All-Girl Release: Meow! 3
- Best All-Girl Series: Belladonna: No Warning
- Best All-Sex Release: Slutty and Sluttier 18
- Best Amateur Release: 100% Real Swingers: Meet the Rileys
- Best Amateur Series: College Rules
- Best Anal Release: Wet Asses 2
- Best Anal Series: Evil Anal
- Best Art Direction: Underworld
- Best Big Bust Release: Bra Busters 4
- Best Big Bust Series: Big and Real
- Best Big Butt Release: Big Wet Asses 22
- Best Big Butt Series: Phat Ass White Girls
- Best Cinematography: Francois Clousot (Underworld)
- Best Comedy: Band Sluts
- Best Continuing Series: Slutty and Sluttier
- Best Director – Feature: Brad Armstrong (Underworld)
- Best Director – Foreign Feature: Max Candy & Michael Ninn (The Ingenuous)
- Best Director – Foreign Non-Feature: Tanya Hyde (The House of Sin)
- Best Director – Non-Feature: Mason (Anikka)
- Best Director – Parody: Will Ryder (Not The Wizard of Oz XXX)
- Best Double-Penetration Sex Scene: Skin Diamond, Marco Banderas & Prince Yahshua (Skin)
- Best DVD Extras: The New Behind the Green Door
- Best Editing: Scott Allen (Underworld)
- Best Educational Release: Jessica Drake’s Guide to Wicked Sex: Anal Play for Men
- Best Ethnic Release – Asian: Asian Bombshells
- Best Ethnic Release – Black: Big Black Wet Asses 13
- Best Ethnic Release – Latin: Butthole Barrio Bitches 2
- Best Ethnic Series: 8th Street Latinas
- Best Fem-Dom Strap-On Release: Strap Attack 17
- Best Foot/Leg Fetish Release: Foot Fanatic
- Best Foreign Feature: The Ingenuous
- Best Foreign Non-Feature: Claire Castel: The Chambermaid
- Best Foreign Continuing Series: Slutty Girls Love Rocco
- Best Gonzo Release: Remy LaCroix’s Anal Cabo Weekend
- Best Group Sex Scene: Bonnie Rotten, Karlo Karrera, Tony DeSergio, Mick Blue & Jordan Ash (The Gang Bang of Bonnie Rotten)
- Best Interracial Release: Lex Turns Evil
- Best Interracial Series: Mandingo Massacre
- Best Makeup: Melissa Makeup (Evil Head)
- Best Marketing Campaign – Individual Project: Farrah Superstar: Backdoor Teen Mom (Vivid Celeb)
- Best MILF Release: MILF Revolution
- Best MILF Series: My Friend's Hot Mom
- Best Music Soundtrack: Grease XXX: A Parody
- Best New Line: Skow for Girlfriends Films
- Best New Series: Wet Asses
- Best Non-Sex Performance: Kyle Stone (Hotel No Tell)
- Best Older Woman/Younger Girl Release: Cougars, Kittens & Cock 2
- Best Oral Release: American Cocksucking Sluts 3
- Best Oral Series: Deep Throat This
- Best Orgy/Gangbang Release: Gangbanged 5
- Best Original Song: "Queen of Munchkin Land" by Jeff Mullen (Not The Wizard of Oz XXX)
- Best Packaging: Underworld (Wicked Pictures)
- Best POV Release: The Hooker Experience
- Best POV Series: Tanlines
- Best POV Sex Scene: Kennedy Leigh & Jules Jordan (Ultimate Fuck Toy: Kennedy Leigh)
- Best Pro-Am Release: Brand New Faces 42
- Best Pro-Am Series: Bang Bus
- Best Safe Sex Scene: Jessica Drake & Brad Armstrong (Sexpionage: The Drake Chronicles)
- Best Screenplay: Brad Armstrong (Underworld)
- Best Screenplay – Parody: David Stanley (Clerks XXX: A Porn Parody)
- Best Solo Release: All Natural Glamour Solos 3
- Best Solo Sex Scene: Maddy O'Reilly (Not The Wizard of Oz XXX)
- Best Special Effects: Iron Man XXX: An Axel Braun Parody
- Best Specialty Release – Other Genre: Evil BBW Gold 3
- Best Specialty Series – Other Genre: Evil BBW Gold
- Best Squirting Release: Squirt Gasms!

**Video Categories (continued)**

- Best Supporting Actor: Xander Corvus (Underworld)
- Best Supporting Actress: Brandy Aniston (Not The Wizard of Oz XXX)
- Best Tease Performance: Anikka Albrite (Anikka)
- Best Three-Way Sex Scene – Boy/Boy/Girl: Anikka Albrite, James Deen & Ramón Nomar (Anikka)
- Best Three-Way Sex Scene – Girl/Girl/Boy: Remy LaCroix, Riley Reid & Manuel Ferrara (Remy 2)
- Best Transsexual Release: Rogue Adventures 38
- Best Transsexual Series: American She-Male X
- Best Transsexual Sex Scene: Zoey Monroe & Jacqueline Woods (Rogue Adventures 38)
- Best Vignette Release: Show No Mercy
- Best Wall-to-Wall Release: Performers of the Year 2013
- Best Young Girl Release: The Innocence of Youth 5
- Best Young Girl Series: Cuties
- Clever Title of the Year: Cirque du Hole-A
- Most Outrageous Sex Scene: Chanel Preston & Ryan Madison ("Give Me Strength" - Get My Belt)

**Video Body of Work Categories**

- All-Girl Performer of the Year: Shyla Jennings
- BBW Performer of the Year: April Flores
- Best Male Newcomer: Ike Diezel
- Best Marketing Campaign – Company Image: Evil Angel
- Best New Studio: Hard X/Erotica X
- Female Foreign Performer of the Year: Anissa Kate
- Mainstream Star of the Year: James Deen
- Male Foreign Performer of the Year: Rocco Siffredi
- MILF Performer of the Year: India Summer
- Unsung Male Performer of the Year: Voodoo
- Unsung Female Performer of the Year: Presley Hart

**Fan Awards Categories**

- Best Body: Jayden Jaymes
- Best Boobs: Kagney Linn Karter
- Favorite Female Porn Star: Riley Steele
- Favorite Male Porn Star: James Deen
- Favorite Studio: Brazzers
- Favorite Webcam Girl: LittleRedBunny
- Hottest MILF: Lisa Ann
- Most Promising New Starlet: Christy Mack
- Social Media Star: Lexi Belle

**Pleasure Products Categories**

- Best Condom Manufacturer: Trojan
- Best Enhancement Manufacturer: Sensuva
- Best Fetish Manufacturer: Sportsheets
- Best Lingerie or Apparel Manufacturer: Coquette International
- Best Lubricant Manufacturer: Wicked Sensual Care
- Best Pleasure Product Manufacturer – Small: OhMiBod
- Best Pleasure Product Manufacturer – Medium: LELO
- Best Pleasure Product Manufacturer – Large: Sportsheets
- Best Product Line for Men: Fleshlight
- Best Product Line for Women: JOPEN

**Retail and Distribution Categories**

- Best Adult Distributor: Entrenue
- Best Boutique: The Tool Shed (Milwaukee, WI)
- Best Retail Chain – Small: Fairvilla Megastore
- Best Retail Chain – Large: Hustler Hollywood
- Best Web Retail Store: AdamEve.com

**Web & Technology Categories**

- Best Affiliate Program: Gamma Entertainment
- Best Alternative Website: Kink.com
- Best Dating Website: AmateurMatch.com
- Best Glamour Website: AndrewBlake.com
- Best Live Chat Website: MyFreeCams.com
- Best Membership Website: EvilAngel.com
- Best Porn Star Website: Asa Akira (AsaAkira.com) & Joanna Angel (JoannaAngel.com) [tie]
- Best Solo Girl Website: Vicky Vette (VickyAtHome.com)
- Best Studio Website: EvilAngelVideo.com
- Best Web Director: Brando
- Best Web Premiere: Public Disgrace 31515 (Kink.com)

== Honorary AVN Awards ==
The Reuben Sturman Award for battling for industry rights was not presented in 2014.

=== Visionary Award ===
Wicked Pictures founder Steve Orenstein was chosen to receive the third annual Visionary Award for "ethics, civic responsibility, an eye for quality and innovation, and a compassionate understanding of adult entertainment and its place in mainstream society".

=== Hall of Fame ===
The AVN Awards Hall of Fame inductees, "all of whom have attained not only longevity but also something more important: memorable achievements in front of the camera, behind the camera and back in the office", for 2014 were:

- Founders Branch: Kevin Beechum, founder of content production/distribution company K-Beech; Ted Blitt, founder of Mile High Media; Morty Gordon, founder of Bizarre Video.
- Video Branch: Barrett Blade, producer Shylar Cobi, Digital Playground director Robby D., Stormy Daniels, Ben English, Melissa Hill, Mike John, Katsuni, Scott Lyons, Nick Manning, Eric Masterson, Mr. Pete, director Bobby Rinaldi, Taylor St. Claire & Wendy Williams.
- Executive Branch: Distributor Jerry E. of Juicy Entertainment and Exquisite Multimedia, Adam H. of Pleasure Productions, and Ed Kail & Marty Turkel.
- Pleasure Product Branch: Lavi Yedid of NS Novelties; Robert Pyne Sr., founder of distribution company Williams Trading; and Rachel Venning & Claire Cavanah of adult retailer Babeland.
- Internet Founders Branch: Angie Rowntree, founder of Sssh.com; Freeones.com founder Maurice; Mark "Greenguy" Jenkins of Link-O-Rama.com.

== Multiple awards and nominations ==
The following releases received multiple awards:

- 9 awards: Underworld
- 5 awards: Anikka
- 4 awards: Not The Wizard of Oz XXX
- 3 awards: The Ingenuous
- 2 awards: Grease XXX: A Parody, Meow! 3, Rogue Adventures 38 & Skin

The following releases received the most nominations:

- 17 nominations: Underworld
- 16 nominations: Not The Wizard of Oz XXX
- 12 nominations: Man of Steel XXX

The following individuals received multiple awards:

- 3 awards: Anikka Albrite, Brad Armstrong, James Deen, Remy LaCroix & Riley Reid
- 2 awards: Bonnie Rotten, Manuel Ferrara, Mia Malkova, Mick Blue & Skin Diamond

The following individuals received the most nominations (includes fan voting nominations & excludes producer nominations):

- 17 nominations: Anikka Albrite & James Deen
- 15 nominations: Joanna Angel & Ramón Nomar
- 14 nominations: Bonnie Rotten & Mick Blue
- 13 nominations: Remy LaCroix & Tommy Pistol
- 12 nominations: Riley Reid
- 11 nominations: Allie Haze, Chanel Preston & Skin Diamond
- 10 nominations: Axel Braun, Christy Mack, Dani Daniels, Manuel Ferrara, Mia Malkova & Prince Yahshua

== Presenters and performers ==
The following individuals were presenters or performers during the awards ceremony:

=== Presenters ===
Presenters (in order of appearance)

Name(s)	Role
Brandy Aniston, Dani Daniels, Xander Corvus	Presenters of the Best Girl/Girl Sex Scene Award
Dave Navarro, Penny Pax, Stoya	Presenters of the Best Star Showcase & Best Oral Sex Scene awards
Jessa Rhodes, Jenna J. Ross, Tommy Pistol	Presenters of the Best Boy/Girl Sex Scene & Best Romance Movie awards
Francesca Lé, Mark Wood	Presenters of the Fan Award for Hottest Ass
Barrett Blade, Maddy O'Reilly, Summer Brielle	Presenters of the Best New Starlet, Best Actor, Best Anal Sex Scene Award & Best BDSM Movie awards
Riley Reid, Steven St. Croix, Danica Dillon	Presenters of the Best Actress & Best Parody – Drama awards
Axel Braun, Riley Steele, Teri Weigel	Presenters of the Male Performer of the Year, Transsexual Performer of the Year & Female Performer of the Year awards
Nina Hartley, Sunny Lane	Presenters of the Best Sex Scene in a Foreign-Shot Production & Best Parody – Comedy awards
Paul Fishbein, Asa Akira, Samantha Saint, Jessica Drake, Stormy Daniels, Kaylani Lei	Presenters of the Visionary Award
Prince Yahshua, Jesse Jane, Ash Hollywood	Presenters of the Best Drama & Director of the Year awards
Ron Jeremy, Allison Moore, Joanna Angel	Presenters of the Movie of the Year Award

=== Trophy girls ===
Trophy girls
- Evi Fox
- Emily Austin

=== Performers ===
Performers

Name(s)	Role	Performed
Machine Gun Kelly	Performer	Hip-hop hits
Rebekah Kochan	Co-Host	Comedian, all-girl slumber party skit
Remy LaCroix	Performer	Hula hoop
Brandy Aniston, Natasha and Jaime of Hell's Belles Burlesque	Performers	“Kitty Kat Lost”, Burlesque tease
Chanel Preston, Samantha Saint	Co-Hosts	Skit
Dana DeArmond, Nicole Aniston, James Bartholet	Performers	Porn Class skit

== Ceremony information ==
With the strong showing in awards categories by feature movies, Adult Video News proclaimed them alive and well: "Despite mumbling that features and parodies have run their course, several were big winners this year, including Underworld, Grease XXX, Temptation of Eve and Man of Steel XXX."

=== Changes to awards categories ===
Beginning with the 31st AVN Awards, several new categories were introduced to reflect evolving market trends, including:

- Best Safe Sex Scene
- Best Condom Manufacturer
- All-Girl Performer of the Year
- BBW Performer of the Year
- Best Web Director

Meanwhile, the Best Photography Website category was renamed Best Glamour Website "to include sites that also feature glamorous video content". Unsung Starlet of the Year was renamed Unsung Female Performer of the Year, Best New Production Company became Best New Studio and Crossover Star of the Year became Mainstream Star of the Year.

Fan vote categories increased from four to 10 and the categories themselves were completely changed, from Favorite Body, Twitter Queen, Favorite Porn Star and Best Free Adult Website, to the following:

- Best Body
- Best Boobs
- Favorite Porn Star (Female)
- Favorite Porn Star (Male)
- Favorite Studio
- Favorite Web Cam Girl
- Hottest Ass
- Hottest MILF
- Most Promising New Starlet
- Social Media Star (which includes Twitter, Facebook and Instagram)

AVN also added another category to its Hall of Fame: "the Executive Branch, for key members of the industry who work behind the scenes" such as in sales, marketing or education.

Best Celebrity Sex Tape and Best Internal Release were dropped on this year's list of categories.

=== Reception and review ===
Some media outlets were critical of the show. Robin Leach of the Las Vegas Sun reported he was told attendance was down and the entertainment was terrible.

Richard Abowitz, who covers the adult industry for The Daily Beast termed the show "lackluster", noting, "Though long-billed as the Academy Awards for the adult industry, few take that label seriously anymore. The massive decline in the porn industry’s fortunes thanks to regulatory challenges and piracy and the infinity of sex offerings on the Internet have left the remains of the mainstream porn industry closer to the cheesy and sleazy parody of the other Hollywood that defined porn’s golden era of the '80s."

ExpressMilwaukee sexuality blogger Laura Anne Stuart expressed mixed feelings about the new BBW Performer of the Year award category: "On one hand, I’m glad that the most well-known adult industry awards are recognizing that larger women are sexy and sexual. On the other hand, this probably means that the Best Actress and Female Performer of the Year categories will continue to be won by skinny people with preternaturally large boobs and/or butts."

== In Memoriam ==
As the show was beginning, AVN used a segment to pay a tribute to adult-industry personalities who had died since the 2013 awards show, including Screw publisher Al Goldstein and producer/distributor Morty Gordon.

== See also ==
- Adult Video News Awards
- AVN Award for Male Performer of the Year
- AVN Female Performer of the Year Award
- AVN Award for Male Foreign Performer of the Year
- List of members of the AVN Hall of Fame
