= Dakota Skye =

Dakota Skye may refer to:

- Dakota Skye (actress) (1994–2021), American pornographic actress
- Dakota Skye (film), a 2008 coming of age drama
