= Chanel Preston =

American pornographic film actress (born 1985)

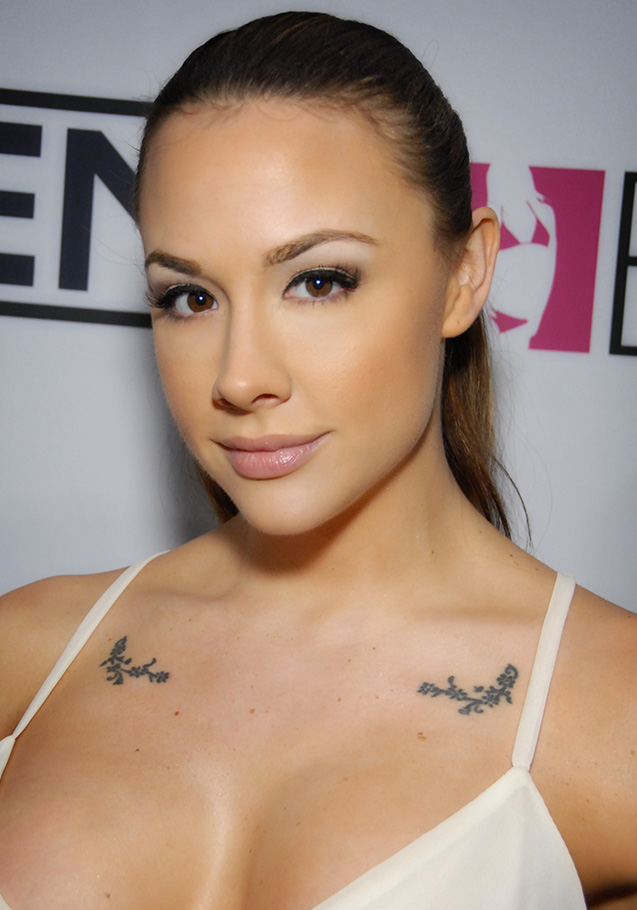
- Preston in 2013
- Born: Alaska, U.S.
- Occupations: Pornographic film actress; director; sex educator
- Years active: 2010–present
- Children: 3
- Website: chanelpreston.com

Chanel Preston is an American pornographic film actress, director, and sex educator. She was named Penthouse Pet of the Month in March 2012.

== Early life ==
Preston was born and raised in Alaska.

== Career ==
=== Appearances ===
Preston was on CNBC's list of "The Dirty Dozen: Porn's Most Popular Stars" in 2012, 2013, 2014, 2015, and 2016.

In February 2012, Preston was announced by Penthouse magazine to be their Penthouse Pet for March 2012. In September 2012, Preston appeared in the Russ Irwin music video "Get Me Home".

Preston co-hosted the 31st annual AVN Awards show alongside Samantha Saint on January 18, 2014. In 2015 she appeared in the "Bust" music video by rapper Waka Flocka Flame.

Also in January 2014, she was featured alongside Dana DeArmond, Asa Akira, and Jessie Andrews in a Cosmopolitan article titled "4 Porn Stars on How They Stay Fit". The article was inspired by actress Gabrielle Union's comment made on Conan O'Brien's talk show about striving to follow the fitness routines of the porn stars she saw at her gym. She has also appeared as an extra on Sons of Anarchy.

=== Other ventures ===
In March 2014, Preston launched a sex education based web series titled Naked with Chanel. According to Cosmopolitan, the series "examines how our society and upbringing influences our ideas about sex". In order to fund the series, Preston used the fundraising website IndieGogo. Her 2013 campaign generated enough to build the series' website and to film several episodes. In a poll held in 2025 she became the best-known porn star in Iran.

Preston has served as president of the Adult Performer Advocacy Committee and hosted a sex-positive podcast named "SexThink" with talk show host and political critic, Rob Nelson.

== Awards ==
- 2010 NightMoves Award – Best New Starlet (Editor's Choice)
- 2011 NightMoves Award – Female Performer of the Year (Editor's Choice)
- 2011 XBIZ Award – New Starlet of the Year
- 2011 XRCO Award – Best New Starlet (tied with Allie Haze)
- 2012 NightMoves Award – Best Overall Body (Editor's Choice)
- 2013 NightMoves Award – Female Performer of the Year (Fan's Choice)
- 2013 XBIZ Award – Best Scene (Gonzo/Non-Feature Release) – Nacho Invades America 2 (with Nacho Vidal)
- 2013 Sex Award – Hottest Sex Scene – Evil Anal 16 (with Phoenix Marie & Manuel Ferrara)
- 2014 AVN Award – Most Outrageous Sex Scene – Get My Belt (with Ryan Madison)
- 2015 Free Speech Coalition – Positive Image Award
