= Venus Lux =

American pornographic actress

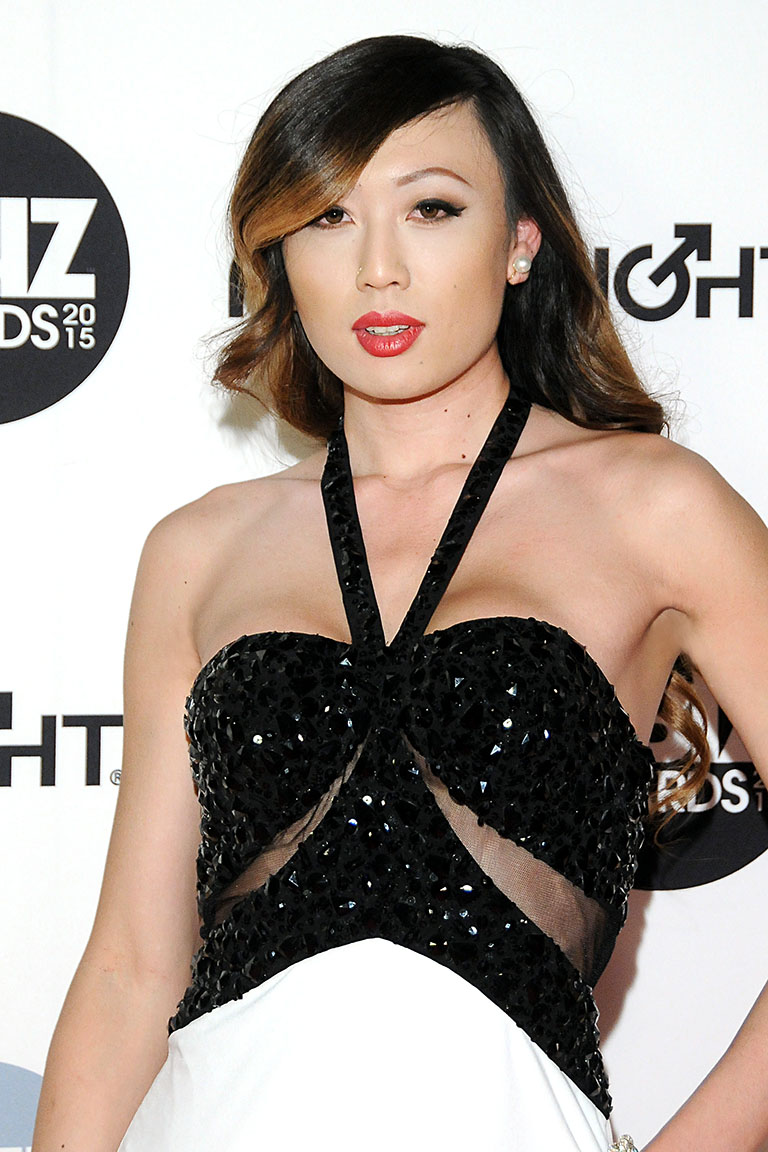
- Venus Lux at the XBIZ Awards on January 15, 2015
- Occupations: Pornographic actress; director; producer; educator
- Website: venus-lux.com

Venus Lux is an American transgender pornographic actress, director, producer, and educator.

== Career ==
Lux owns a studio called Venus Lux Entertainment. In December 2014, she signed an exclusive three-year distribution deal with Pulse Distribution. In 2012, she began writing a column titled "Venus Rising". She compiled some of those columns into a book titled Venus Lux Diaries, which was released in March 2015. In October 2015, she launched TransGlobal Magazine. In 2016, Venus Lux founded Syren Network and the website TS Fetishes, both of which launched in the spring. She is featured in the sequel of the documentary After Porn Ends titled After Porn Ends 2.

== Mainstream media appearances ==
Television
Year	Title	Role	Notes
2012	Brody Stevens: Enjoy It!	Herself	
2013	The Naughty Show	Herself	Episode: "The Brody Stevens Dating Game"
2014	VICE	Herself	
2016	BuzzFeed	Herself	

== Awards and nominations ==
List of accolades received by Venus Lux
Awards & nominations
Award	Won	Nominated
AVN Awards	3	6
NightMoves Awards	1	2
Tranny Awards	3	10
XBIZ Awards	2	5
- Total number of wins and nominations
Totals	9	23

AVN Awards
Year	Result	Award	Work
2013	Nominated	Best Transsexual Sex Scene (with Annalise Rose & Christian XXX)	American She-Male X 2
2013	Nominated	Transsexual Performer of the Year	—N/a
2014	Nominated	Best Transsexual Sex Scene (with Spencer Fox)	America's Next Top Tranny 17
2014	Nominated	Best Transsexual Sex Scene (with Jane Marie, Chanel Couture & Christian XXX)	TS Jane Marie: 5 Star Bitch
2014	Nominated	Transsexual Performer of the Year	—N/a
2015	Won	Best Transsexual Sex Scene (with Dana Vespoli)	TS, I Love You
2015	Won	Transsexual Performer of the Year	—N/a
2016	Nominated	Best Transsexual Sex Scene (with Eva Lin)	Venus Lux Fantasies
2016	Won	Transsexual Performer of the Year	—N/a

NightMoves Awards
Year	Result	Award
2013	Nominated	Best TS Performer
2014	Won	Best Transsexual Performer (Fan Choice)
2015	Nominated	Best Transsexual Performer

Tranny Awards
Year	Result	Award	Work
2013	Nominated	Best Solo Model	—N/a
2013	Nominated	Best Hardcore Model	—N/a
2013	Nominated	Best New Face	—N/a
2013	Nominated	Best Scene (with Katie)	Next Idol 5
2014	Nominated	Best Scene (with Jessica Fox, Maitresse Madeline & Eva Lin)	TSPussyHunters.com
2014	Nominated	Best Scene (with Blake)	TSSeduction.com
2014	Won	Best Scene (with Foxxy)	Asian Nail Salon
2014	Won	Best Solo Site	Venus-Lux.com
2014	Won	Best Hardcore Model	—N/a
2015	Nominated	Best Hardcore Performer	—N/a
2015	Nominated	Best Solo Website	—N/a
2015	Nominated	Best Internet Personality	—N/a
2015	Nominated	Best Scene (with Dana Vespoli)	TS, I Love You

XBIZ Awards
Year	Result	Award	Work
2013	Nominated	Transsexual Performer of the Year	—N/a
2014	Won	Transsexual Performer of the Year	—N/a
2014	Nominated	Transsexual Site of the Year	Venus-Lux.com
2015	Won	Transsexual Performer of the Year	—N/a
2015	Nominated	Adult Site of the Year - Transsexual	Venus-Lux.com
2016	Nominated	Transgender Performer of the Year	—N/a
2016	Nominated	Adult Site of the Year - Transgender	Venus-Lux.com
