= Dakota Skye (actress) =

American pornographic actor (1994–2021)

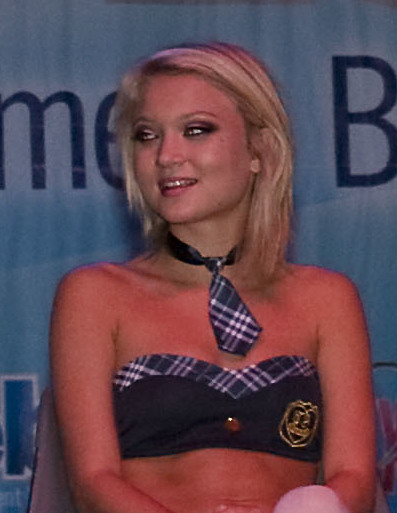
- Skye at the 2014 Exxxotica Expo
- Born: Lauren Kaye Scott; April 17, 1994; Tampa Bay area, Florida, U.S.
- Died: June 9, 2021 (aged 27); Los Angeles, California, U.S.
- Cause of death: Acute multidrug intoxication
- Other name: Kota Sky
- Occupation: Pornographic film actor
- Years active: 2013–2019
- Spouse: Zachary Lecompte-Goble (m. 2016, separated)

Signature
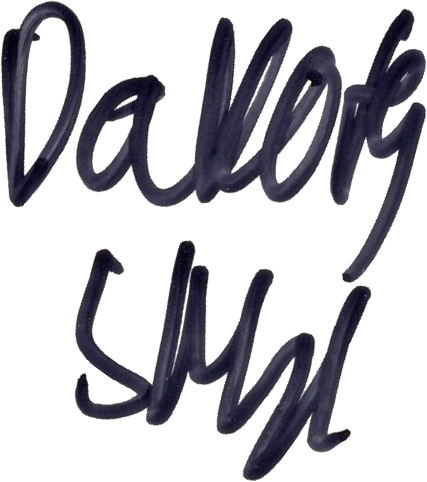

Lauren Kaye Scott (April 17, 1994 – June 9, 2021), known professionally as Dakota Skye, was an American pornographic film actor who appeared in more than 300 such videos from 2013 through 2019.

== Personal life ==
Skye was born as Lauren Kaye Scott on April 17, 1994, in Tampa or Clearwater, Florida. Sexually abused as a child, she was first raised by her alcoholic mother and aspired to be a marine biologist. In her early teens, she moved in with her father's family in southern Ohio. Skye met Zachary Lecompte-Goble at a party in 2015, and after terminating a 2016 pregnancy, the two were married that year in Las Vegas, but soon separated before 2017.

In 2019, Skye's mother died of "addiction and alcoholism". Sources close to Skye reported troubles in the final period of her private life. The Toronto Sun reported that in 2020, two of her grandparents died of COVID-19, she found herself homeless, and her pet dog died.

In spring 2021, it was revealed that Skye was working as an escort. That May she was criticized for a photo she posted to Instagram showing her posing topless in front of a George Floyd mural.

=== Substance abuse ===
According to Lecompte-Goble, it was when Skye lost an industry award in 2015 that her substance abuse dramatically increased. Her Xanax use increased to 10–15 pills at a time, and she began smoking methamphetamine. From 2017–2019, Skye entered drug rehabilitation at least six times, but only stayed for a few days each time. In her final days, Skye was still struggling with years-long addictions to alcohol and fentanyl.

As recounted by family, friends, and coworkers, Skye's behavior became erratic by the mid-2010s. Fellow actress Kianna Bradley and director Jacky St. James both described an impulsive and gregarious woman who "was never too proud to be silly." Yet she would also "become paranoid and violent, accusing people of sexually abusing or harming her or claiming that shadowy forces were pursuing her and trying to end her life." Her husband recalled times she threatened him with a knife, or when she flew to Paris "to make a sex tape with a stranger". Skye would claim to be watched by hidden cameras, a target for assassination because of an affiliation with the Kennedy family, and a victim of rape by Ron Jeremy.

=== Criminal charges ===
In mid-2017, after striking her boyfriend, in Pinellas Park, Florida, Skye was arrested and jailed by police on a charge of domestic battery (a misdemeanor). Those charges were later dropped. She pleaded guilty to driving under the influence in Burbank, California, in 2019, and in 2020 she was jailed in Van Nuys for misdemeanor charges.

== Career ==
Skye began working in pornography in 2013, performing under the names Dakota Skye or Kota Sky. Her first talent agent said that both Skye's work ethic and "the [juxtaposition] of tiny girl/big penis"—Skye was five feet (1.5 m) tall—allowed the teen to succeed right away. By late 2014, AVN reported her measurements as 32A-25-36, and praised her work saying she "turned in dozens of spectacular performances in the past year, and scored her own showcase movie, Meet Dakota Skye for Digital Sin". Skye moved to Los Angeles after about 2.5 years to work for Mark Spiegler.

Prior to December 2018, she took time off from the industry to get sober and address her mental health. She was "semi-active" in the field until 2020, working with Brazzers, Burning Angel, Digital Playground, Evil Angel, Girlfriends Films, Hustler Video, Jules Jordan Video, Kink.com, Naughty America, Reality Kings among others. Despite being in her mid-to-late 20s, Skye was still cast as a teen due to her "petite stature […] and omnipresent cherubic expression". She appeared in over 300 pornographic videos.

=== Awards ===
Skye won "numerous porn industry awards, including Porn's Next It Girl, Best 'O' Face, and Best Boy/Girl Sex Scene." She was one of Pornhub's most searched-for performers.

| Year | Award | Category | Work | Result | Ref. |
|---|---|---|---|---|---|
| 2014 | NightMoves Awards | Best Feature Showgirl (Fan Choice) | —N/a | Won | |
| 2015 | XBIZ Awards | Best New Starlet | —N/a | Nominated | |
| 2015 | XBIZ Awards | All-Sex Release of the Year | Meet Dakota Skye | Nominated | |
| 2015 | 32nd AVN Awards | Best Star Showcase | Meet Dakota Skye | Nominated | |
| 2015 | 32nd AVN Awards | Best Anal Sex Scene (with James Deen) | Meet Dakota Skye | Nominated | |
| 2015 | 32nd AVN Awards | Best Three-Way Sex Scene - B/B/G (with Jordan Ash & Ramón Nomar) | From Both Ends 2 | Nominated | |
| 2015 | 32nd AVN Awards | Best Boy/Girl Sex Scene | Young & Glamorous 6 | Nominated | |
| 2015 | 32nd AVN Awards | Best POV Sex Scene (with Erik Everhard) | My Brother's Point of View | Nominated | |
| 2015 | 32nd AVN Awards | Best Non-Feature | She's So Small | Nominated | |
| 2015 | 32nd AVN Awards | Best New Starlet | —N/a | Nominated | |
| 2019 | 36th AVN Awards | Favorite Female Performer | —N/a | Nominated | |

== Death ==
Greater Los Angeles

During the evening of June 8, 2021, Skye told friends and coworkers that "the FBI and the Mafia were after her [and] she was going to go become a Hells Angel biker". Everyone she called refused her a place to stay, so she walked from the San Fernando Valley to Los Angeles' Skid Row. In the early hours of June 9, Skye asked to nap in a stranger's recreational vehicle; she was seen smoking something before lying on the man's couch. A short time later she was discovered deceased there, at 652 Moulton Avenue.

The next day, the Los Angeles County Department of Medical Examiner-Coroner confirmed Skye's identity and listed her as homeless, though Rolling Stone contradicted this and said she had been living with her boyfriend in Woodland Hills. Skye's husband identified the body. An autopsy was conducted on June 10, but the release of cause and manner of death were awaiting "further investigation". When released, the autopsy report showed Skye was 63 inches (160 cm) tall, weighed 105 pounds (48 kg), and categorized her death as accidental, caused solely by "acute multidrug intoxication", having detected amphetamine, benzodiazepines (7-aminoclonazepam and alprazolam), benzoylecgonine (a metabolite of cocaine), fentanyl, MDMA, methamphetamine, methylenedioxyamphetamine, and phencyclidine.

== See also ==
- August Ames – Canadian pornographic actress (1994–2017)
