= Mike John =

American actor

- Born: January 17, 1966 (age 59); Los Angeles, California
- Website: http://www.mikejohnpov.com

Mike John is the pseudonym of an American pornographic movie producer, director, and actor.

== Biography ==
John started in the industry as a videographer for Sean Michaels in 1996. He joined Anabolic Video in 1998 as a director with his first series, Panochitas. He became successful at Anabolic with his point-of-view (POV) series, A Perverted Point of View. He is credited for mentoring Lexington Steele and Erik Everhard as directors.

He left Anabolic and joined Red Light District Video (RLD) in 2003. He directed 27 titles for the banner before leaving in January 2006. After leaving RLD, John obtained a permanent injunction against his former company when RLD advertised several series on its website, No Cum Dodging, Boobaholics, and Teen Spermaholics that were confusingly similar to John's series, No Cum Dodging Allowed, Boobaholics Anonymous, and Teenage Spermaholics.

John signed a distribution deal with Jules Jordan Video (JJV) in 2006. John retained full ownership of his titles and the company would earn a percentage for distributing them. His first movie for JJV was the interracial title, Racial Tension which won several awards.

== Awards ==
- 2006 Adam Film World Award for Best P.O.V. Series - P.O.V. Pervert
- 2007 AVN Award for Best Interracial Release - Racial Tension
- 2007 Adam Film World Award for Best Interracial Movie - Racial Tension
- 2008 Adam Film World Award for Best Interracial Movie - Racial Tension 2
- 2010 AVN Award for Best Gonzo Series - Jerkoff Material
- 2010 XRCO Award for Best POV Movie - POV Pervert 11
- 2011 XRCO Award for Best POV Series - POV Pervert
- 2012 XRCO Award for Best POV Series - POV Pervert
- 2013 XRCO Award for Best POV Series - POV Pervert
- 2014 AVN Hall of Fame inductee
