= Mike Adriano =

Pornographic film actor and director

- Born: Mikael Finquel; June 30, 1980 (age 46); Spain
- Other name: Mike
- Years active: 2005–present
- Height: 6 ft 0 in (1.83 m)
- Website: mikeadriano.com

Mike Adriano (born June 30, 1980) is a Spanish adult content producer and director. He has been nominated for best director awards at several AVN Award, XBIZ Award and XRCO Award ceremonies.

== Gonzo pornography ==
Adriano is recognized as a major director in the genre of hardcore gonzo pornography. Some of the distinctive characteristics of his work include a very liberal use of lubricants, very lengthy scenes (over one hour), analingus, and graphic focus on the purely physical aspects of sex.

== Influence ==
Porn star and director Bonnie Rotten has credited Adriano with inspiring and encouraging her to direct. Porn star Candice Dare has expressed her liking for working with Adriano.

== Awards ==
- 2012 AVN Award winner — Best Oral Release — American Cocksucking Sluts
- 2012 AVN Award winner — Most Outrageous Sex Scene — American Cocksucking Sluts (director — Mike Adriano/Evil Angel) with Brooklyn Lee & Juelz Ventura
- 2012 AVN Award winner — Best Oral Sex Scene — American Cocksucking Sluts (director — Mike Adriano/Evil Angel) with Brooklyn Lee & Juelz Ventura
- 2013 AVN Award winner — Best Oral Release — American Cocksucking Sluts 2 (Mike Adriano/Evil Angel)
