= Wet Lubricants =

Wet Lubricants is a brand of personal lubricants produced by Wet International, part of Trigg Laboratories in Las Vegas. The line includes a variety of water-based and silicone-based lubricants, as well as massage oils and shaving creams.

The Chief executive officer of Trigg Laboratories is Michael Trigg, who co-founded the company in 1989 with Executive Vice President Christian Franco. Sean Smith is President since 2012. They started off with one product: Wet brand personal lubricant. In the late 1980s, everyone was very concerned about the transfer of HIV, and the use of condoms skyrocketed. Because condoms are more likely to break without the use of lubricants, Michael Trigg and Christian Franco were inspired to start Wet Lubricants.

== Safety ==
=== HIV Study ===
A 2010 Study by Microbicides, building bridges in HIV Prevention, compared five lubricants against each other (Astroglide, Elbow Grease, ID Glide, KY Jelly, and Wet Platinum). A sixth product named PRÉ was used as a control. The study was looking for the safest lubricant that did the least amount of damage to cellular walls, during sex. Damage to cell walls during sex can cause tearing and increase the likelihood of transmission of STIs. The study concluded that "Wet Platinum and PRÉ were the safest. The hyperosmolar nature of the other lubricant gels was associated with cellular toxicity and may lead to increased risk of HIV infection." Wet was the only silicone-based lubricant in the study. The others were water-based. This and one other study examining the effects of sexual lubricants used in anal sex were presented in April at the International Microbicides Conference."

=== Nonoxynol-9 ===
When Wet was launched, AIDS awareness was at a peak and the original Wet product was formulated with Nonoxynol-9, a spermicidal agent that was an ingredient in many mainstream sexual wellness and contraceptive products at the time. In 1996, studies began to question the efficacy of Nonoxynol-9 in reducing HIV transmission, while isolated cases of skin irritation and inflammation were also reported and Trigg Laboratories chose to remove it from their product. While these studies began eleven years ago, it was only in December 2007 that the Food and Drug Administration finally mandated a warning about Nonoxynol-9.

== Manufacturing ==
In 1989, Wet Lubricants started out in a 1,000 square foot facility in Van Nuys, California. Today, they develop, formulate, mix and package Wet products at a 70,000 square-foot, FDA regulated medical device manufacturing company in Las Vegas, Nevada. Wet is a FDA regulated and audited 510k medical device manufacturing facility.

== Pop culture references ==
In April 2010, Wet Kiwi Strawberry flavored lubricant was featured in an episode of MTV's The Real World: Washington, D.C. when housemate Andrew picked up a bottle and proceeded to snack on the lubricant by pouring it directly into his mouth. He joked that it was really tasty and he would use it on salads.

In May 2010, Wet lubricants were featured on Tori and Dean: Home Sweet Hollywood as a part of Tori's new adventures in wedding planning. Taking on the role of wedding planner for her friend Brandy's wedding, Tori is charged with flower arrangements, cakes, set-up and the bridal party gift bags, in which she provided a variety of Wet personal lubricants.

In June 2010, Wet Platinum was featured in the "adult" version of the music video for Ludacris' single "Sex Room", which debuted on Vevo. Wet Platinum was used by Ludacris in a steamy bedroom scene. The edited version of the video was released on MTV and MTV2 but does not include scenes with Wet.

Wet Platinum Serum products were launched in December 2015 specifically for the major pharmacy, mass market retailers and food chains. Adult love boutiques carry up to 85 different Wet products.
