= Dana Vespoli =

American pornographic film actres and director (born 1972)

- Vespoli in 2014
- Born: 1972 (age 53–54)
- Education: Mills College
- Occupations: Pornographic film actress; director; producer
- Spouse: Manuel Ferrara (m. 2005; div. 2012)
- Children: 3

Dana Vespoli (born 1972) is an American pornographic film actress, director, and producer.

== Early life ==
Vespoli graduated from Mills College with a bachelor's degree in comparative literature, and also co-captained the rowing team.

== Career ==
Vespoli began performing in adult films in 2003 at age 31, after working as a stripper at the Mitchell Brothers O'Farrell Theatre in San Francisco. She began directing her own films in 2006, starting with a feature for Digital Sin. She has also directed for Sweetheart Video and Evil Angel. Vespoli's directing work has focused mainly on lesbian pornography. She has been nominated for several AVN Awards and XBIZ Awards, mostly for her work with Evil Angel.

In 2011, Complex ranked Vespoli thirteenth on their list of "The Top 50 Hottest Asian Porn Stars of All Time". In 2014, Break.com ranked her 31st on their list of "40 Best Asian Porn Stars Today". She was also placed on CNBC's list of "The Dirty Dozen: Porn's Biggest Stars" in 2015 and 2016. Vespoli was inducted into the AVN Hall of Fame in 2016.

== Personal life ==
Vespoli married pornographic film actor Manuel Ferrara in January 2005 and has three children with him. The couple divorced seven years later.

== Awards ==
- 2007 AFWG Award – Directrix Of The Year
- 2013 AVN – Game Changer
- 2013 NightMoves Award – Best Director, Non-Parody (Editor's Choice)
- 2014 XBIZ Award – Director of the Year, Non-Feature Release – Girl/Boy
- 2014 NightMoves Award – Best Transsexual Release (Editor's Choice) – TS, I Love You
- 2015 AVN Award – Best Transsexual Sex Scene (with Venus Lux) – TS, I Love You
- 2015 Inked Award – Girl/Girl Scene of the Year (with Bonnie Rotten) – Twisted Lesbian Anal Spit Play
- 2015 Inked Award – Bill Snyder Achievement Award
- 2016 AVN Hall of Fame
- 2016 Spank Bank Award – Most Magnificent MILF
- 2017 XBIZ Award – Best Actress, All-Girl Release – Lefty
- 2018 XBIZ Award – Trans Director of the Year
- 2018 NightMoves Award – Best Transsexual Director (Fan's Choice)
- 2019 NightMoves AWard – Best Transsexual Director (Fan's Choice)
- 2022 XCritic Award – Best Director, Non-Feature – I Am Aubrey
