= Bonnie Rotten =

American pornographic film actress and model (born 1993)

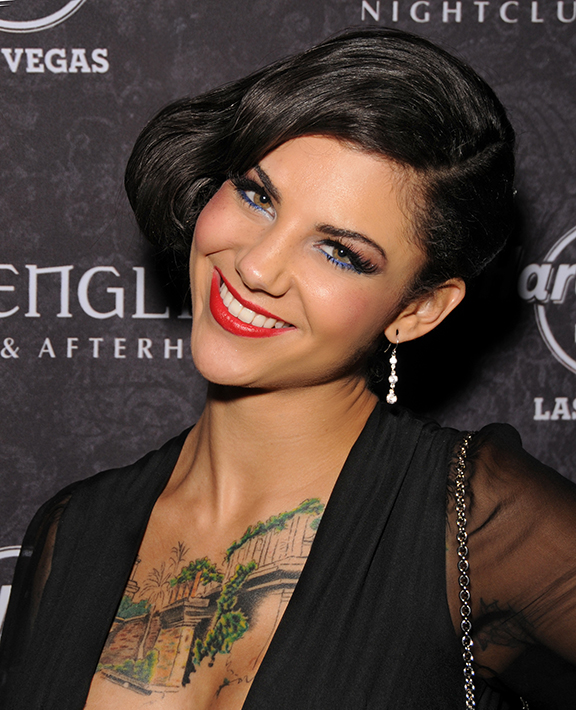
- Rotten in 2014
- Born: May 1993 (age 33); Cincinnati, Ohio, U.S.
- Other name: Dixie
- Occupations: Pornographic film actress; feature dancer; fetish model; director
- Spouse: Jesse James (m. 2022)
- Children: 2

Bonnie Rotten (born May 1993) is an American former pornographic film actress, feature dancer, fetish model, and director. In 2014, she became the first alt-porn star to win the AVN Award for Female Performer of the Year.

== Early life ==
Rotten was born in May 1993 in Cincinnati, Ohio and was raised by her grandparents. She claims to have had her first sexual experience with multiple male partners at age 16.

== Career ==
Rotten started her career as a fetish model for the magazine Girls and Corpses, which took note of her after she won the Ms. Dead Indiana Beauty Pageant at the Indianapolis Days of the Dead convention. She entered the adult industry in early 2012. Previously, Rotten also worked as a model in car and motorcycle shows. She also began stripping on her eighteenth birthday using the stage name "Dixie". Her routine as a stripper was to always wear American flag bikinis and dance only to Southern rock.

In September 2012, she had a breast augmentation. The company Digital Sin produced two films focused entirely on her, Meet Bonnie, which was a sales-chart-topping success and The Gangbang of Bonnie Rotten. Rotten credits adult video performer Nina Hartley with helping her make the transition from modeling to porn.

In 2014, Rotten reprised the role of "Max Candy" in the porn remake of Cape Fear and cited Robert De Niro's performance in the 1991 version as her inspiration for the role.

In May 2014, Rotten filed a lawsuit against pornographic film actor and producer, Max Hardcore, alleging appropriation of her identity, defamation and intentional infliction of emotional distress, over his publication of a scene the two had recorded together in 2012. In July 2014, Max Hardcore filed a countersuit over image rights, alleging that Rotten had breached the agreement that she signed.

In October 2014, the German-based company Digital Sports Innovation announced the availability of Bonnie Rotten figurines, ranging from five to fourteen inches tall.

In February 2015, the sex toy manufacturer Pipedream announced that it was shipping the "Bonnie Rotten Signature Collection". In April 2015, Rotten generated publicity in Manhattan by going topless in Times Square, Washington Square Park and on the subway.

In June 2015, the daily fantasy sports company Draftster announced that it had signed Rotten to an "exclusive sponsorship and promotional deal."

Starting in 2013, Rotten appeared as a featured performer at strip clubs in numerous cities. In October 2015, The Lee Network announced an exclusive agreement with Rotten to represent her for her dance engagements.

In May 2015, Rotten reported her pregnancy, giving birth to a girl later that year. Since she quit performing in February 2015, she initially had no plans to return to the adult film industry. However, she returned to porn in 2018 until her final retirement in 2020.

=== Mainstream appearances ===
Rotten appears with pornographic film actresses Asphyxia Noir and London Keyes in the music video for the 2013 song "Kiss Land" by The Weeknd.

In January 2014, Rotten was featured in a music video for the song "Let's F**k" by Los Angeles band Piece by Piece along with Terror drummer Nick Jett. The video debuted on Vimeo.

In 2013, LA Weekly ranked her fifth on their list of "10 Porn Stars Who Could Be the Next Jenna Jameson". She was also placed on CNBC's list of "The Dirty Dozen: Porn's Most Popular Stars" in 2014 and 2015.

In 2014, The Daily Beast referred to Rotten as "Porn's current 'It' girl" in an article about the annual AVN Awards at which she won "Female Performer of the Year". Though declaring that the porn industry had "died," performer Joey Silvera is quoted as saying: "there is still enough magic left that the awards can make a difference for Bonnie if she wins."

=== Other ventures ===
In January 2014, Rotten launched her own production company (Mental Beauty, Inc.) and signed a distribution deal with Girlfriends Films. She made her directorial debut with the film To the Core. She also directed Sisters of Anarchy for Digital Playground.

=== Tattoos ===
Rotten has over thirty tattoos, and her stage name comes from a so-named pin-up zombie that she has tattooed on the back of her right leg. In one instance, she claimed that her favorite tattoo is the one on her stomach, featuring a zombie from the comic book Night of the Living Dead: The Beginning, Issue 1. It was her first ever tattoo and took 13 hours to complete. In June 2013, she said that her favorite tattoo was of Frank Sinatra on her leg. In addition to the above list, Rotten also has a spiderweb on each of her breasts with the areola as the center of each web. She is credited with furthering the acceptance of porn performers with tattoos.

In 2017, she opened a tattoo shop called Bonnie Rotten's Best Kept Secret, staffed by the artists Ryan Stoner, Gentle Jay and Mark Matthews. The shop was open for one year. Citing differences between her and Jay, the shop was closed in early 2018.

== Personal life ==
After her career, Rotten became passionate about shooting and now advocates for gun rights.

Rotten married television host Jesse James in June 2022. They have a son.

== Awards ==
List of accolades received by Bonnie Rotten
Awards
Award	Won
AVN Awards	3
Fanny Awards	1
NightMoves Awards	9
NINFA Awards	2
Venus Awards	1
XBIZ Awards	1
XRCO Awards	1
Other Awards	12
- Total number of wins
Totals	30

Year	Ceremony	Award	Film
2012	NightMoves Award	Miss Congeniality	—N/a
2012	Inked Award	Starlet of the Year	—N/a
2012	Inked Award	DVD of the Year	Meet Bonnie
2013	NightMoves Award	Best All Sex Release (Editor's Choice)	Meet Bonnie
2013	NightMoves Award	Social Media Star (Fan's Choice)	—N/a
2013	NightMoves Award	Best Ink (Fan's Choice)	—N/a
2013	Sex Award	Hottest New Girl	—N/a
2013	Inked Award	Female Performer of the Year	—N/a
2013	Inked Award	Scene of the Year	The Gang Bang of Bonnie Rotten
2014	XBIZ Award	Best Scene – Non-Feature Release (with Karlo Karerra, Tony DeSergio, Mick Blue, & Jordan Ash)	The Gang Bang of Bonnie Rotten
2014	AVN Award	Best Group Sex Scene (with Karlo Karerra, Tony DeSergio, Mick Blue, & Jordan Ash)	The Gang Bang of Bonnie Rotten
2014	AVN Award	Female Performer of the Year	—N/a
2014	XCritic Award	Female Performer of the Year	—N/a
2014	Fanny Award	Kink Performer of the Year	—N/a
2014	XRCO Award	Superslut	—N/a
2014	TLARaw Award	Best Female Newcomer	—N/a
2014	Exotic Dancer Award	Adult Movie Entertainer of the Year	—N/a
2014	NINFA Award	Special Award	—N/a
2014	NightMoves Award	Best Female Performer (Fan's Choice)	—N/a
2014	NightMoves Award	Best Ink (Editor's Choice)	—N/a
2014	NightMoves Award	Best Fetish/Specialty Release (Fan's Choice)	Bonnie Rotten is Squirtwoman
2014	Venus Award	Best Actress (International)	—N/a
2015	XCritic Award	Queen of Porn	—N/a
2015	AVN Award	Kinkiest Performer (Fan Award)	—N/a
2015	Spank Bank Award	Super Squirter of the Year	—N/a
2015	NINFA Award	Best Scene of the Year	Bonnie Rotten en ActricesDelPorno
2015	NightMoves Award	Best Ink (Fan's Choice)	—N/a
2015	Inked Award	Girl/Girl Scene of the Year (with Dana Vespoli)	Twisted Lesbian Anal Spit Play
2016	NightMoves Award	Triple Play Award (Dancing/Performing/Directing)	—N/a
2017	Inked Award	Hall of Fame	—N/a
