= Manuel Ferrara =

French adult entertainer and director (born 1975)

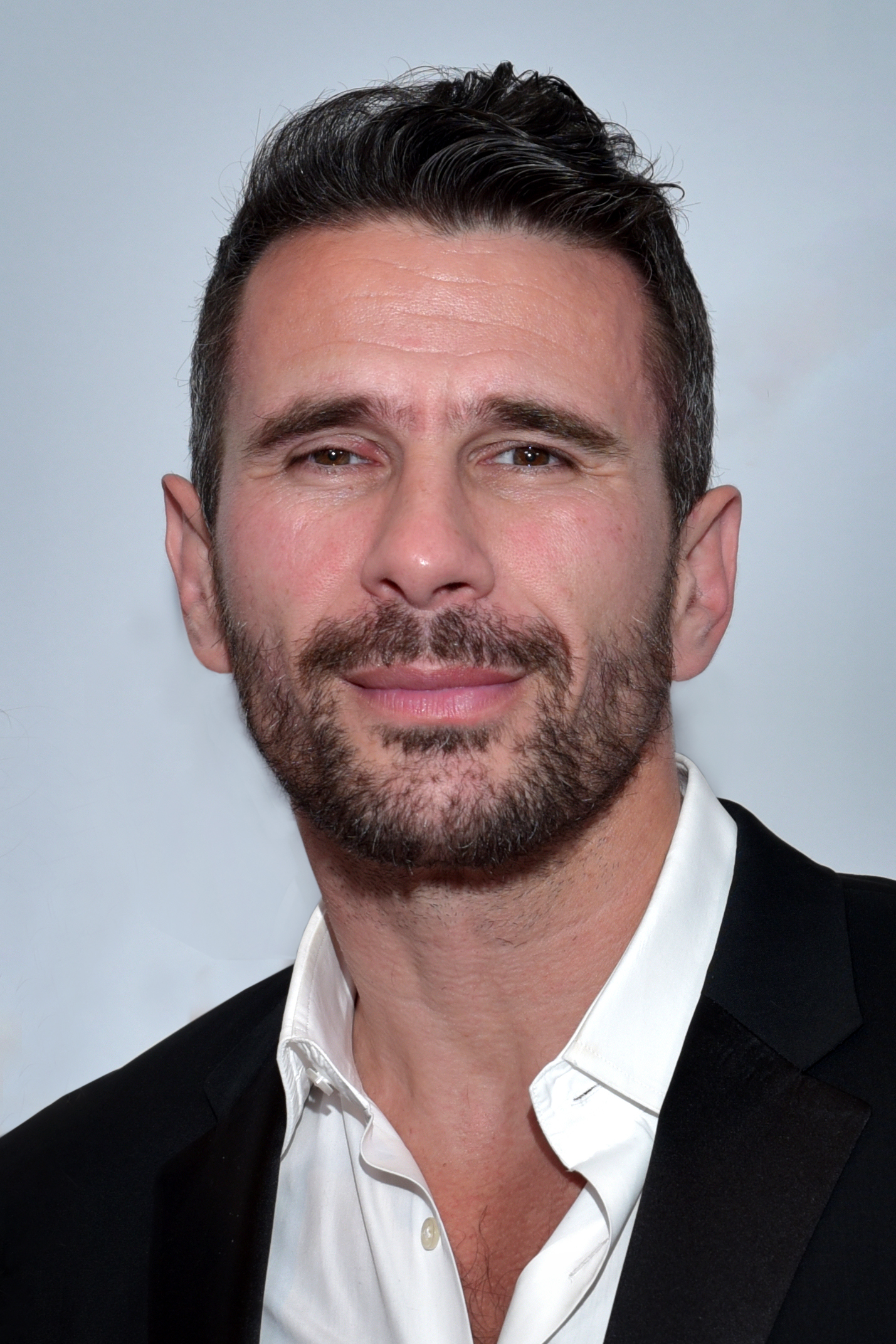
- Ferrara at the XBIZ Awards show in 2019
- Born: Manuel Jeannin; 1 November 1975 (age 51); Le Raincy, France
- Occupations: Adult entertainer; director
- Years active: 1997–present
- Spouse: Dana Vespoli (m. 2005; div. 2012)
- Partner: Kayden Kross (2012–2026) Sophia Kyriacou (2026-Present)
- Children: 4
- Website: manuelferrara.com

Manuel Jeannin (French: [manɥɛl ʒanɛ̃]; born 1 November 1975), known professionally as Manuel Ferrara, is a French adult entertainer and director. One of the leading actors in the porn industry, Ferrara has won over 64 adult industry awards including six AVN Awards as Male Performer of the Year—the record for the accolade, and was inducted into the AVN and XRCO Halls of Fame.

== Early life ==
Ferrara was born in Le Raincy, France, and raised in nearby Gagny He was born to a French father and a Spanish mother. His father was an electrician, and his mother was a cleaning lady who had immigrated to France. His father died when Ferrara was 17. Manuel studied to become a P.E. teacher.

== Career ==
Ferrara shot his first hardcore scene in 1997 during his studies, after answering an ad in a French pornographic magazine. He then started a career as a professional porn actor, appearing in various French and European productions. He chose the stage name Manuel Ferrara because of his passing resemblance to boxer-turned-actor Stéphane Ferrara.

Ferrara became a protégé of Rocco Siffredi, who recommended him for a role in John Stagliano's Fashionistas in which he made his American debut. In 2003, he started directing gonzo pornography for Platinum X Pictures, a subsidiary of Red Light District Video. In 2004, he began directing for Red Light.

After working for Red Light District for two years, Ferrara began directing for Evil Angel in May 2006. His first Evil Angel film was Evilution, starring Naomi, Melissa Lauren and featuring the comeback of Nici Sterling. Since then, he has directed several porn series, including Fucked on Sight, Slutty & Sluttier, Raw, Evil Anal, Battle of the Sluts, Anal Expedition, Teen Cum Squad, Bangin' Black Boxes, Ass Attack, I'm Your Slut, Mindfuck and New Whores on the Block.

On 23 December 2010, Ferrara appeared alongside Riley Steele in an episode of Manswers titled "Airplane Plane Hanger-On" to discuss their careers for the segment "How Can You Become A Porktastic Porn Star".

On 22 January 2012, he became the first actor in history to win AVN's Male Performer of the Year four times. He won AVN's Male Performer of the Year for a fifth time on 18 January 2014.

In 2012, Ferrara appeared alongside pornographic film actress Zoe Voss in an explicit sex scene for the mainstream film Starlet.

== Personal life ==
Ferrara was married to pornographic film actress Dana Vespoli in January 2005. The couple divorced seven years later. They have three sons together. Ferrara has a daughter with his recently separated partner, American pornographic film actress and director Kayden Kross.

Ferrara is currently in a relationship with Sophia Kyriacou.

== Awards and nominations ==
List of awards and nominations received by Manuel Ferrara
Awards and nominations
Award	Wins	Nominations
AVN Awards	40	41
XRCO Awards	11	11
XBIZ Awards	5	5
NightMoves Awards	4	4
Hot d'Or Awards	2	2
Adam Film World Guide Awards	2	2
- Total number of wins and nominations
Totals	64	65

AVN Awards
Year	Category	Nominated work	Co-nominees	Result	Ref(s)
2004	Male Foreign Performer of the Year	—N/a	—N/a	Won	
2004	Best Group Sex Scene, Video	Back 2 Evil	Ashley Long, Julie Night and Nacho Vidal	Won	
2005	Male Performer of the Year	—N/a	—N/a	Won	
2005	Best Couples Sex Scene, Video	Stuntgirl	Venus	Won	
2006	Male Performer of the Year	—N/a	—N/a	Won	
2006	Best Anal Sex Scene (Video)	Cumshitters	Katsumi	Won	
2007	Best Sex Scene Coupling (Film)	Emperor	Janine	Won	
2007	Best Sex Scene Coupling (Video)	Slave Dolls 2	Tiffany Mynx	Won	
2007	Best Supporting Actor (Video)	She Bangs	—N/a	Won	
2007	Best Three-Way Sex Scene	Fuck Slaves	Sandra Romain and Sasha Grey	Won	
2008	Best Couples Sex Scene, Video	Evil Anal 2	Jenna Haze	Won	
2008	Best POV Release	Fucked on Sight 2	—N/a	Won	
2008	Best POV Series	Fucked on Sight	—N/a	Won	
2009	Best Anal Sex Scene	Big Wet Asses 13	Sunny Lane	Won	
2009	Best Three-Way Sex Scene	The Jenny Hendrix Anal Experience	Delilah Strong, Jenny Hendrix and Michael Stefano	Won	
2009	Best Gonzo Series	Slutty and Sluttier	—N/a	Won	
2009	Best Anal-Themed Series	Evil Anal	—N/a	Won	
2010	Male Performer of the Year	—N/a	—N/a	Won	
2010	Best Anal-Themed Series	Evil Anal	—N/a	Won	
2011	Best Couples Sex Scene	Kristina Rose Is Slutwoman	Kristina Rose	Won	
2011	Best Anal Sex Scene	Asa Akira Is Insatiable	Asa Akira	Won	
2011	Best Anal-Themed Series	Evil Anal	—N/a	Won	
2011	Best Gonzo Series	Slutty & Sluttier	—N/a	Won	
2012	Best Boy/Girl Scene	The Bombshells 3	Lexi Belle	Won	
2012	Male Performer of the Year	—N/a	—N/a	Won	
2012	Hottest Sex Scene (Fan Award)	Babysitters 2	BiBi Jones, Jesse Jane, Kayden Kross, Riley Steele and Stoya	Won	
2012	Best Anal Series	Evil Anal	—N/a	Won	
2012	Best Big Butt Series	Phat Bottom Girls	—N/a	Won	
2012	Best Gonzo Series		—N/a	Won	
2013	Best Anal Sex Scene	Oil Overload 7	Brooklyn Lee	Won	
2013	AVN Hall of Fame inductee	—N/a	—N/a	Won	
2013	Best Continuing Series	Slutty & Sluttier	—N/a	Won	
2013	Best Vignette Release	Slutty & Sluttier 16	—N/a	Won	
2014	Best Three-Way Sex Scene	Remy 2	Remy LaCroix and Riley Reid	Won	
2014	Male Performer of the Year	—N/a	—N/a	Won	
2014	Best All-Sex Release	Slutty & Sluttier 18	—N/a	Won	
2014	Best Anal Series	Evil Anal	—N/a	Won	
2014	Best Continuing Series	Slutty & Sluttier	—N/a	Won	
2015	Best Anal Sex Scene	Internal Damnation 8	Adriana Chechik	Won	
2019	Male Performer of the Year	—N/a	—N/a	Won	
2019	Best Boy/Girl Sex Scene	Female of the Species	Evelyn Claire	Nominated	
2021	Best Boy/Girl Sex Scene	Pretty Little Sluts 3	Kenna James	Nominated	
2021	Best Foreign-Shot Anal Sex Scene	Manuel's Euro Tour: Paris	Malena	Nominated	
2021	Best Foreign-Shot Boy/Girl Sex Scene	Manuel's Euro Tour: Paris	Liya Silver	Won	
2021	Best Gonzo/Wall-to-Wall Movie or Anthology	Raw 38	—N/a	Nominated	
2021	Best Gonzo/Wall-to-Wall Series or Site	Dirty Talk	—N/a	Nominated	
2021	Best Ingénue Movie or Anthology	Pretty Little Sluts 3	—N/a	Nominated	
2021	Best POV Sex Scene	Dirty Talk 8	Jane Wilde	Nominated	
2021	Best POV Sex Scene	Manuel's Fucking POV 13	Gianna Dior	Nominated	
2021	Director of the Year	—N/a	—N/a	Nominated	
2021	Male Performer of the Year	—N/a	—N/a	Nominated	

XBIZ Awards
Year	Category	Nominated work	Co-nominees	Ref(s)
2009	Male Performer of the Year	—N/a	—N/a	
2012	Gonzo Series of the Year	Phat Bottom Girls	—N/a	
2014	Best Scene – Feature Movie	Code of Honor	Jesse Jane, Kayden Kross, Riley Steele, Selena Rose and Stoya	
2015	Director of the Year – Non-Feature Release	Misha Cross Wide Open	Kayden Kross	
2017	Best Sex Scene – Gonzo Release	Black Anal Asses	—N/a	

XRCO Awards
Year	Category	Nominated work	Co-nominees	Ref(s)
2003	New Stud	—N/a	—N/a	
2004	Male Performer of the Year	—N/a	—N/a	
2004	Sex Scene (Couple)	Babes in Pornland 14: Bubble Butt Babes	Jewel De'Nyle	
2004	Best Threeway Sex Scene	Mason's Dirty Tricks	Julie Night and Steve Holmes	
2005	Male Performer of the Year	—N/a	—N/a	
2006	Male Performer of the Year	—N/a	—N/a	
2011	Male Performer of the Year	—N/a	—N/a	
2011	XRCO Hall of Fame inductee	—N/a	—N/a	
2012	Male Performer of the Year	—N/a	—N/a	
2013	Male Performer of the Year	—N/a	—N/a	
2013	Best Gonzo Series	Raw	—N/a	

NightMoves Awards
Year	Category	Nominated work	Co-nominees	Ref(s)
2006	Best Actor (Editor's Choice)	—N/a	—N/a	
2013	Best Male Performer (Fan's Choice)	—N/a	—N/a	
2013	Best Ongoing Series (Fan's Choice)	RAW	—N/a	
2014	Best Director – Non-Feature (Fan's Choice)	—N/a	—N/a	

Hot d'Or Awards
Year	Category	Nominated work	Co-nominees	Ref(s)
2009	Best American Gonzo Director	Slutty and Sluttier	—N/a	
2009	Best French Male Performer	—N/a	—N/a	

Adam Film World Guide Awards
Year	Category	Nominated work	Co-nominees	Ref(s)
2004	Male Performer of the Year	—N/a	—N/a	
2006	Male Performer of the Year	—N/a	—N/a	
