= Remy LaCroix =

American pornographic film actress (born 1987/1988)

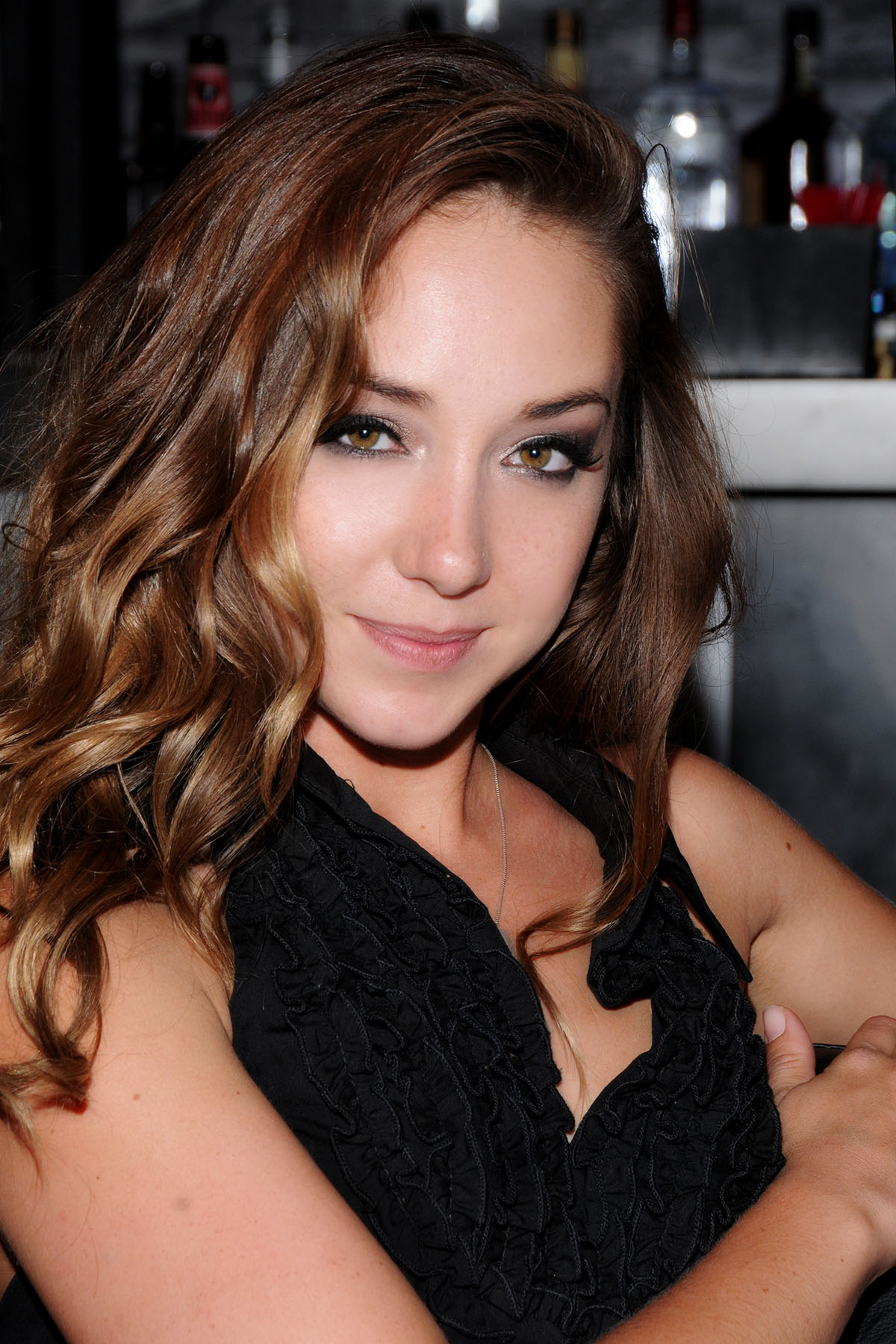
- LaCroix in 2014
- Born: 1987 or 1988 (age 38–39)
- Occupation: Pornographic film actress
- Years active: 2011–2016; 2020–present

Remy LaCroix (born 1987 or 1988) is an American pornographic film actress. She received AVN Awards for Best New Starlet in 2013 and Best Actress in 2014, along with the 2014 XRCO Award for Female Performer of the Year.

== Early life ==
Before entering the adult entertainment industry, LaCroix was a specialty dancer for several music festivals and Burning Man. Her performances included fire dancing, aerial silks and hula-hooping.

== Career ==
LaCroix entered the adult film industry in December 2011, with a gang bang scene for Kink.com, which was discussed in the James Franco-produced documentary Kink (2013). She worked for six months before announcing that she was leaving porn. Citing burnout, she continued to honor previous commitments, worked for the talent department at Kink.com, and promoted her unreleased movies, eventually returning to shooting in November 2012.

In 2013, LA Weekly ranked her tenth on their list of '10 Porn Stars Who Could Be the Next Jenna Jameson'. She was also placed on CNBC's yearly list 'The Dirty Dozen: Porn's Most Popular Stars' in 2013 and 2014.

In December 2014, it was announced that Remy LaCroix was signed as a contract star with ArchAngel Productions, but less than three months into her contract she terminated her relationship with the production company.

In 2016, LaCroix was a judge on the online reality TV series The Sex Factor, which is a pornographic version of The X Factor.

She retired from professional shooting in 2016 due to pregnancy, but in 2020, she announced her return to the porn industry. Her comeback scene, for the Bellesa studio, was shot in July 2022 and released in September 2022.

In late 2024, Remy was nominated for Hottest Boy/Girl Creator Collab at the 2025 AVN Awards with creator 2 Drops.

== Awards ==
- 2013: AVN Award – Best New Starlet
- 2013: AVN Award – Best Tease Performance – Remy (with Lexi Belle)
- 2013: XBIZ Award – Best Actress - Couples-Themed Release – Torn
- 2013: XCritic Award – Best New Starlet
- 2013: XCritic Award – Best Couples Themed Release – Torn
- 2013: XRCO Award – Best New Starlet
- 2013: Sex Award – Porn's Perfect Girl/Girl Screen Couple (with Riley Reid)
- 2014: AVN Award – Best Actress – The Temptation of Eve
- 2014: AVN Award – Best Girl/Girl Sex Scene – Girl Fever (with Riley Reid)
- 2014: AVN Award – Best Three-Way Sex Scene (Girl/Girl/Boy) – Remy 2 (with Riley Reid and Manuel Ferrara)
- 2014: XBIZ Award – Best Actress - Feature Movie – The Temptation of Eve
- 2014: XRCO Award – Female Performer of the Year
- 2014: XRCO Award – Best Actress – The Temptation of Eve
- 2014: NightMoves Award – Best Female Performer (Editor's Choice)
- 2015: AVN Award – Best Girl/Girl Sex Scene – Gabi Gets Girls (with Gabriella Paltrova)
- 2023: XBIZ Award – Best Sex Scene - Career-First Performance – Remy's Back With a Bang (with Dante Colle, Damon Dice, Tommy Pistol, and John Strong)
