= Internet Adult Film Database =

Online database of US pornographic films and actors

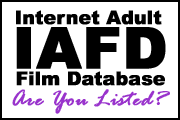
- Website type: Pornography, movie database
- Available in: English
- Website: iafd.com
- Commercial: Yes
- Launched: 1995; 31 years ago
- Current status: Online
- Content license: Proprietary

The Internet Adult Film Database (IAFD) is an online database of information pertaining to the pornography industry: actors, actresses, directors, studios, distributors and pornographic films.

== History ==
The predecessor to IAFD was email- and FTP-accessible database of adult film actresses called Abserver that had been created by Dan Abend in 1993.

IAFD was started by Peter van Aarle, who had collected data on adult movies since 1981, when he began keeping notes on index cards on adult movies he had seen or were reviewed in Adam Film World. In 1993, he began contributing to the Usenet newsgroup alt.sex.movies, where he met Dan Abend. The two exchanged databases and began work on a WWW-based database.

Van Aarle later collaborated on this Web database with Ron Wilhelm, who went by the pseudonym of "Heretic". The first version of the IAFD was brought on-line in 1995 by the programming efforts of Wilhelm, who used the project as a training ground for SGML programming which he was learning in college. After Wilhelm left the Internet to join the military, the site eventually fell victim to link rot.

In the fall of 1998, Van Aarle was at a trade show with Jeff Vanzetti, who asked if Van Aarle would be interested in resurrecting the IAFD — this time under its own domain. Vanzetti was looking for a project on which to teach himself on-line database programming using SQL Server, and this seemed like a natural fit, since they were both co-moderators of the newsgroup rec.arts.movies.erotica (RAME), and members of the newsgroup would often lament about the passing of the original Internet Adult Film Database.

The beginning of 1999 brought the first steps towards the relaunch of the IAFD. Initially, search boxes only searched females, and data was restricted to movies released post-1989.

Van Aarle said on this:

In those early days of the IAFD I had made one stipulation: I did not want the movie info on movies before 1989 to be available. The idea behind this was basically that if I would ever decide I wanted to do something commercially with my database it would be a good idea to keep the most valuable parts of it off limits. The data on older titles was clearly the most difficult to compile (and very few people I ever talked to had much info on the older stuff, with a few notable exceptions like Jim Holliday), and therefore the more valuable part of the data. The cut-off date of 1989 was a compromise to include at least the titles of Buttman, who was one of the most popular directors of the time.

Van Aarle died on September 18, 2005, at the age of 42 from a heart attack. In 2011, he was inducted into the XRCO Hall of Fame.

On March 1, 2007, the IAFD rolled out information on over 18,000 gay titles and some 39,000 gay performers.

According to Vanzetti, IAFD adds about 500 new titles a month and processes thousands of corrections—corrections that anyone can submit for review. IAFD takes user corrections though forms on the site. The forms are not automated and corrections the site receives are manually updated after having been reviewed by the site's staff. IAFD has a "team of editors" that exercises editorial control over what's posted on the site: "If it's submitted by a fan of the performer and the working editor trusts the submitter, it gets listed. If it's published by someone else, it might get added—we are skeptical of user generated sites since anyone can submit anything to them regardless of accuracy and then it becomes 'fact'. Otherwise, no data." IAFD's policy on releasing real names of adult film performers is: "The exception to this rule is when it comes to real names. We're not interested in linking your real name to your porn name, so if your real name appears on the site, we will remove it (assuming we know what your real name is). However, if your real name appeared on a boxcover due to a mix up in the Art Department, there's little we can do about that."

IAFD gets "paid by sponsors for ad banners", and they "get an affiliate commission from products purchased" via the site.

== Review and research ==
The site has been used as a reference by a variety of outlets that include newspaper articles, books, and research studies. The academic and non-academic writing community has also used the site's information to varying degrees. In 2011, the site released a report of compiled data for the year. Included in the statistics released were the number of new titles added that year (9,384) and a ranking of who the busiest performers were. The report also included site data, such as that it was visited by 20.7 million unique viewers and that visitors to the site viewed nearly a quarter of a billion pages. An editor at AVN magazine stated: "[it] underscores the fact that a lot of people not only like porn but want to research information about movies and performers."

=== Media outlets ===
Considered the "Internet Movie Database" of the adult entertainment world", the site is also routinely quoted or referenced by the majority of the industry trade publications, such as Adult Video News (AVN) and XBIZ.

=== Deep Inside: A Study of 10,000 Porn Stars ===
On February 14, 2013, a study was released by freelance journalist Jon Millward that sampled the data from 10,000 actors (7,000 women and 3,000 men) from the site to, among other things, compile a profile of the "average porn star" as well as generate some statistics about adult industry actors based on IAFD data. The study was written about several days later on Playboy.com. It showed that the typical female porn star was a five-foot-five-inch brunette with B-cup breasts.

The survey was started in 2011, with the researcher's first visit to IAFD.com, with the bulk of Millward's research taking place in the six months prior to the release of the study. For comparative results, the study also cites Centers for Disease Control and U.S. census statistics as well as information from a Stanford University linguistics professor.

The survey covers roughly a 40-year span of the adult industry and presents statistics on categories such as age, race, state of origin, chosen screen name, biological data (height, weight, hair color, etc.), and the type of sexual acts performed over an actor's career.

== See also ==
- Adult film
- Adult Film Database
