= Girlfriends Films =

American pornographic film studio

- Industry: Pornographic films, video-on-demand
- Founded: 2002
- Headquarters: Valencia, California, United States
- Website: girlfriendsfilms.net

Girlfriends Films (or GFF) is an American pornographic film studio based in Valencia, California and founded in 2002. The studio was founded by Dan O'Connell and "Moose" (who serve as president and vice-president, respectively). On January 1, 2014, it was announced that Moose had purchased O'Connell's interest in the company and that O'Connell will retain ownership of Groundwork Visions, the production company behind his Girlfriends movies to date, while entering into an arrangement to continue shooting movies exclusively for the studio.

The studio specializes in lesbian-themed films. O'Connell writes and directs 95% of the films. On December 16, 2012, the studio moved from its home of six years in Reseda, California to a new 37,000 square foot facility in Valencia, California.

GFF operates a video on demand website in addition to selling DVDs of its productions. Launched in October 2013, via a licensing deal with LFP Broadcasting, who owns Hustler TV and New Frontier Media, the studio also provides content for a cable channel based exclusively on its productions.

GFF received two separate coronavirus-related Paycheck Protection Program loans. GFF received one loan of $170,732.00 in April 2020, which has been fully repaid or forgiven by the SBA. The SBA does not differentiate in their reporting between a repaid loan versus a forgiven loan. A second loan from the SBA of $170,732.00 in February, 2021 has not yet been fully repaid or forgiven as of August 2022.
