= XBIZ Awards =

Adult entertainment industry award

XBIZ/XMAs Awards
- Illustration of the XBIZ/XMAs Awards since 2020
- Sponsored by: XBIZ
- Date: 2003
- Location: Los Angeles, California, U.S.
- Country: United States
- Presented by: XBIZ
- Reward: Trophy
- First award: 2003; 23 years ago
- Final award: Present
- Website: xbizawards.xbiz.com

XBIZ Awards, renamed as XMAs Awards from 2025 onwards, are given annually to honor "individuals, companies, performers and products that play an essential part in the growth and success of adult films". They have been described by XBIZ publisher and founder Alec Helmy as being "born out of the industry's desire for an awards event that not only encompasses all facets of the business but one which presents it in a professional light and honors it with class". The awards have been likened to the international film and TV industry's Golden Globes.

Organized by the adult industry trade magazine XBIZ, the awards were first given in 2003. The award nominations are submitted by clients, and the winners are voted for by XBIZ staff, industry colleagues and participating organizations. The awards were originally created to recognize achievement in the online adult industry, but, in recent years, video categories have been added.

As of 2014, the number of specific award categories has expanded over the years to include more than 150 award categories. The award winners listed below are mostly for major award categories, but a more comprehensive listing of past award winners may be found in the "External links" section.

== Achievement in movie production ==
- 2008: Paul Thomas

== Acting performance ==
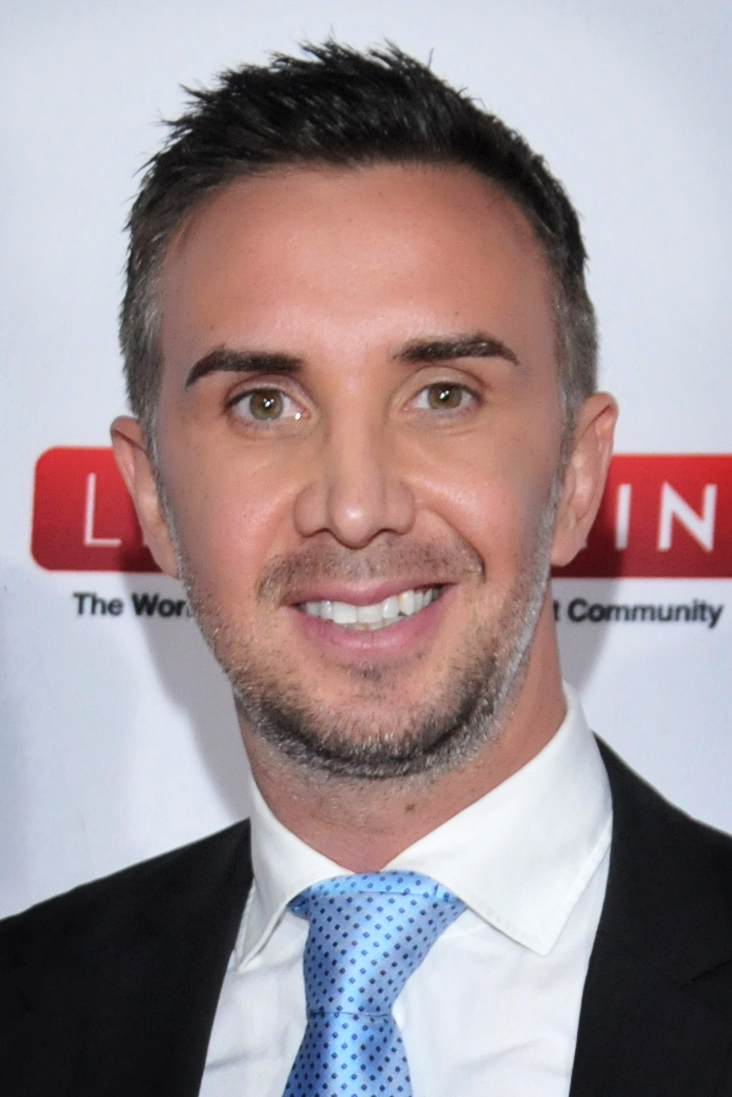
Keiran Lee at the 2016 XBIZ Awards Show

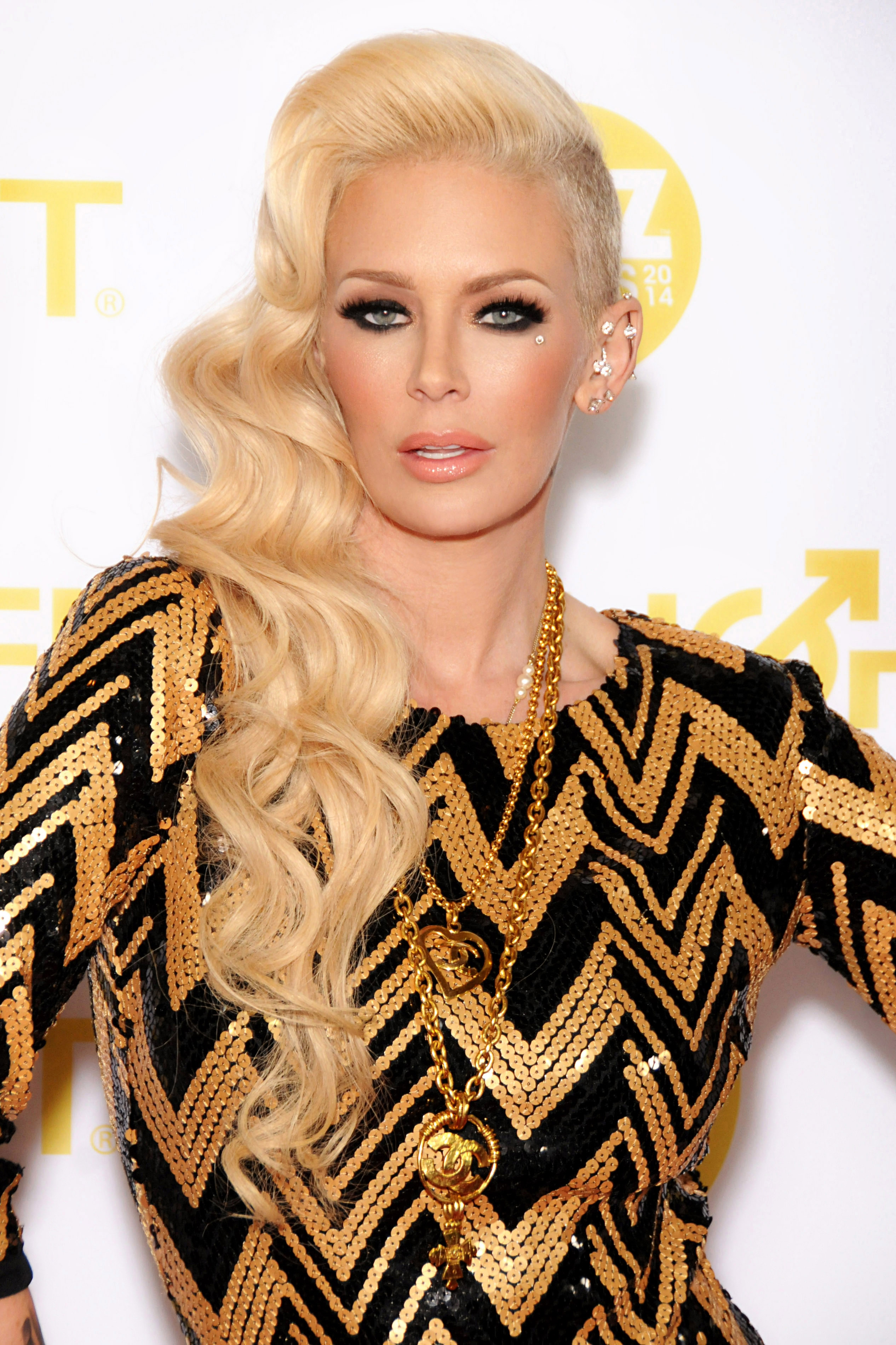
Jenna Jameson at the 2014 XBIZ Awards Show

=== Acting Performance (Female) of the Year ===
- 2010: Kimberly Kane, The Sex Files: A Dark XXX Parody (Revolution X/Digital Sin)
- 2011: Kayden Kross, Body Heat (Digital Playground)
- 2012: Jessie Andrews, Portrait of a Call Girl (Elegant Angel)

=== Best Acting – Lead ===
- 2021: Maitland Ward, Muse
- 2022: Maitland Ward, Muse 2
- 2023: Jane Wilde, Stars
- 2024: Nicole Kitt, Ashford Manor
- 2025: Maitland Ward, American MILF
- 2026: Ryan Reid, Deadly Vows

=== Best Acting – Supporting ===
- 2021: Seth Gamble, A Killer on the Loose
- 2022: Victoria Voxxx, Primary 2
- 2023: Tommy Pistol, Deranged
- 2024: Victoria Voxxx, Primary 3
- 2025: Tommy Pistol, Project X

=== Best Actress – Feature Movie ===
- 2013: Lily Carter / Lily LaBeau (tie), Wasteland
- 2014: Remy LaCroix, The Temptation of Eve (New Sensations)
- 2015: Carter Cruise, Second Chances, (New Sensations)
- 2016: India Summer, Marriage 2.0 (Lion Reach/Adam & Eve Pictures)
- 2017: Mia Malkova, The Preacher's Daughter (Wicked Pictures)
- 2018: Penny Pax, The Submission of Emma Marx: Evolved (New Sensations)
- 2019: Avi Love, The Possession of Mrs. Hyde (Wicked Pictures)
- 2020: Maitland Ward, Drive (Deeper)

=== Best Actress – Parody/Comedy Release ===
- 2013: Allie Haze, Star Wars XXX, (Axel Braun Productions/Vivid Entertainment)
- 2014: Riley Reid, Grease XXX: A Parody (X-Play/Adam & Eve Pictures)
- 2015: Jessica Drake, Snow White XXX: An Axel Braun Parody (Axel Braun Productions/Wicked Pictures)
- 2016: Riley Steele, Barbarella XXX: An Axel Braun Parody (Wicked Pictures)
- 2017: Abigail Mac, True Detective XXX (Digital Playground)
- 2018: Joanna Angel, Jews Love Black Cock (Burning Angel/Exile)
- 2019: Joanna Angel, Dirty Grandpa (Burning Angel)
- 2020: Ivy Wolfe, The Rule (MissaX)

=== Best Actress – Couples-Themed Release ===
- 2013: Remy LaCroix, Torn (New Sensations)
- 2014: Marie McCray, Truth Be Told (Skow for Girlfriends Films)
- 2015: Maddy O'Reilly, The Sexual Liberation of Anna Lee (New Sensations)
- 2016: Keira Nicole, The Swing Life (New Sensations)
- 2017: Cassidy Klein, New Beginnings (Wicked Pictures)
- 2018: Asa Akira, The Blonde Dahlia (Wicked Pictures)
- 2019: Mona Wales, Insomnia (Wicked Pictures)
- 2020: Kristen Scott, Greed, Love and Betrayal (MissaX)

=== Best Actress – All-Girl Release ===
- 2013: Sheridan Love, Against Her Will (New Sensations)
- 2014: Dani Daniels, The Vampire Mistress (Sparks Entertainment/Exile)
- 2015: Carter Cruise, Lesbian Vampire Academy (Hustler Video)
- 2016: Penny Pax, Lesbian Fashionistas (Adam & Eve Pictures)
- 2017: Dana Vespoli, Lefty (Sweetheart Video/Mile High)
- 2018: Brandi Love, The Candidate (Sweetheart Video/Mile High)
- 2019: Stoya, Talk Derby to Me (Sweetheart Video)
- 2020: Kristen Scott, Teenage Lesbian (Adult Time)

=== Best Actress - Taboo Release ===
- 2019 Gia Paige, The Jealous Brother (Pure Taboo/Gamma Films)
- 2020: Alina Lopez, Bishop's Interview: An Alina Lopez Story (Pure Taboo)

=== Acting Performance (Male) of the Year ===
- 2010: Evan Stone, This Ain't Star Trek (Hustler Video)
- 2011: Keni Styles, Malice in Lalaland (Miss Lucifer Productions/Vivid Entertainment)
- 2012: Tommy Pistol, Taxi Driver XXX (Sensuous Diamond/Pleasure-Dynasty/Exile Distribution)

=== Best Actor – Feature Movie ===
- 2013: Steven St. Croix, Torn, (New Sensations)
- 2014: James Deen, The New Behind the Green Door (Vivid Entertainment)
- 2015: Steven St. Croix, Wetwork (Vivid Entertainment)
- 2016: Steven St. Croix, Wanted (Wicked Pictures/Adam & Eve Pictures)
- 2017: Xander Corvus, The Preacher's Daughter (Wicked Pictures)
- 2018: Charles Dera, Half His Age: A Teenage Tragedy (PureTaboo/Pulse)
- 2019: Tommy Pistol, Anne: A Taboo Parody (PureTaboo/Gamma Films)
- 2020: Seth Gamble, Perspective (Adult Time)

=== Best Actor – Parody/Comedy Release ===
- 2013: Seth Gamble, Star Wars XXX (Axel Braun Productions/Vivid Entertainment)
- 2014: Seth Gamble, Grease XXX: A Parody (X-Play/Adam & Eve Pictures)
- 2015: Tommy Pistol, Not the Jersey Boys XXX (X-Play/Pulse)
- 2016: Ryan Ryder, Peter Pan XXX: An Axel Braun Parody (Wicked Pictures)
- 2017: Tommy Pistol, Suicide Squad XXX: An Axel Braun Parody (Wicked Pictures)
- 2018: Michael Vegas, How I Fucked Your Mother: A DP XXX Parody (Digital Playground)
- 2019: Seth Gamble, Deadpool XXX: An Axel Braun Parody (Wicked Pictures)
- 2020: Tommy Pistol, Love Emergency (Adam & Eve Pictures)

=== Best Actor – Couples-Themed Release ===
- 2013: Richie Calhoun, Love, Marriage, & Other Bad Ideas (New Sensations)
- 2014: Derrick Pierce, Tuff Love (Wicked Pictures)
- 2015: Xander Corvus, The Sexual Liberation of Anna Lee (New Sensations)
- 2016: Tommy Pistol, Wild Inside (Vivid Entertainment)
- 2017: Dick Chibbles, Forked (Adam & Eve Pictures)
- 2018: Tommy Pistol, Ingenue (Wicked Pictures)
- 2019: Tommy Pistol, The Weight of Infidelity (PureTaboo/Gamma Films)
- 2020: Zac Wild, Greed, Love and Betrayal (MissaX)

=== Best Actor - Taboo Release ===
- 2019 Michael Vegas, The Jealous Brother (Pure Taboo/Gamma Films)
- 2020: Tommy Pistol, Future Darkly: The Aura Doll (Pure Taboo)

=== Best Supporting Actress ===
- 2012: Raven Alexis, Top Guns (Digital Playground)
- 2013: Skin Diamond, Revenge of the Petites (AMKingdom/Exile Distribution)
- 2014: Riley Reid, The Submission of Emma Marx (New Sensations)
- 2015: Jessa Rhodes, Second Chances (New Sensations)
- 2016: Riley Reid, The Submission of Emma Marx 2: Boundaries (New Sensations)
- 2017: Asa Akira, DNA (Wicked Pictures)
- 2018: Kristen Scott, Half His Age: A Teenage Tragedy (PureTaboo/Pulse)
- 2019: Joanna Angel, Talk Derby to Me (Sweetheart Video)
- 2020: Kenna James, Teenage Lesbian (Adult Time)

=== Best Supporting Actor ===
- 2012: Xander Corvus, Horizon (Wicked Pictures)
- 2013: Brendon Miller, The Dark Knight XXX: A Porn Parody, (Axel Braun Productions/Vivid Entertainment)
- 2014: Tommy Pistol, The Temptation of Eve (New Sensations)
- 2015: Chad White, Second Chances (New Sensations)
- 2016: Brendon Miller, Batman vs. Superman XXX: An Axel Braun Parody (Wicked Pictures)
- 2017: Eric Masterson, The J.O.B. (Wicked Pictures)
- 2018: Small Hands, Half His Age: A Teenage Tragedy (PureTaboo/Pulse)
- 2019: Seth Gamble, The Cursed XXX (Adam & Eve Pictures)
- 2020: Brad Armstrong, Love Emergency (Adam & Eve Pictures)

=== Best New Starlet ===
- 2008: Bree Olson
- 2009: Stoya
- 2010: Kagney Linn Karter
- 2011: Chanel Preston
- 2012: Jessie Andrews
- 2013: Riley Reid
- 2014: Christy Mack
- 2015: Carter Cruise
- 2016: Abella Danger
- 2017: Lana Rhoades
- 2018: Honey Gold
- 2019: Karma Rx
- 2020: Autumn Falls
- 2021: Scarlit Scandal
- 2022: Kenzie Anne
- 2023: Nicole Doshi
- 2024: Queenie Sateen
- 2025: Gal Ritchie
- 2026: Cubbi Thompson

=== Best Non-Sex Acting Performance ===
- 2013: JJ Hollyberry, Not Animal House XXX (X-Play/Adam & Eve Pictures)
- 2014: James Bartholet, Not the Wizard of Oz XXX (X-Play/Pulse)
- 2015: Jacky St. James, Second Chances (New Sensations)
- 2016: Roy Karch, Love, Sex & TV News (X-Play/Adam & Eve Pictures)
- 2017: Tom Byron, Not Traci Lords XXX: '80s Superstars Reborn (X-Play/Pulse)
- 2018: Alec Knight, The Candidate (Sweetheart Video/Mile High)
- 2019: Nina Hartley, Future Darkly: Artifamily (Pure Taboo/Gamma Films)
- 2020: Nina Hartley, Girls of Wrestling (Sweet Sinner)

== Affiliate programs ==
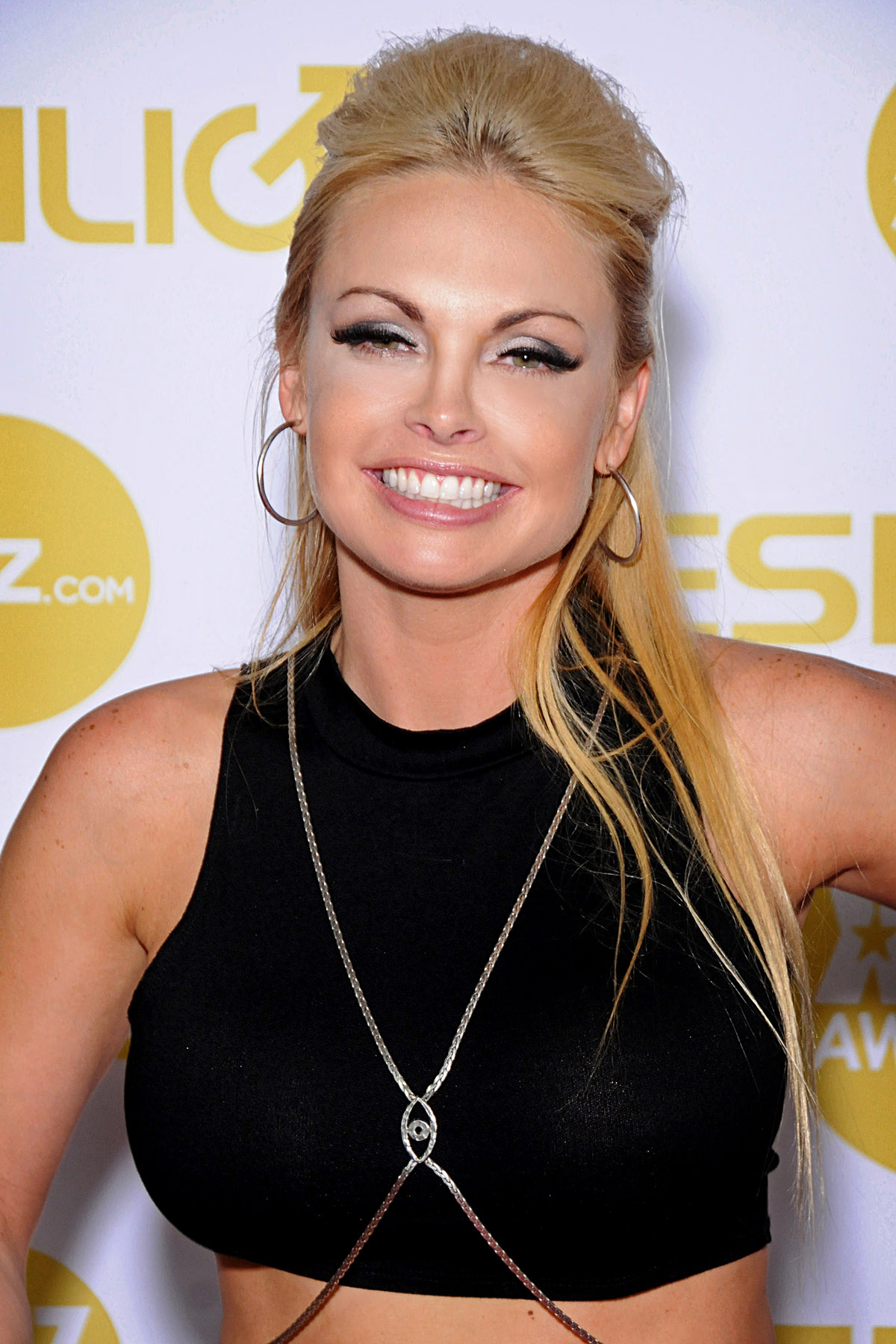
Jesse Jane at the 2014 XBIZ Award Show

=== Affiliate Program/Network of the Year ===
- 2003: Platinum Bucks
- 2004: Adult Revenue Service (ARS)
- 2005: SilverCash
- 2006: SilverCash
- 2007: Lightspeed Cash
- 2008: TopBucks
- 2009: Brazzers
- 2010: Pimproll
- 2011: lollypop
- 2019: CrakRevenue

=== Affiliate Program of the Year - Cam ===
- 2019: Flirt4Free

=== Affiliate Program of the Year – European ===
- 2011: AdultWebmasterEmpire (AWE)
- 2012: AdultWebmasterEmpire (AWE)
- 2013: PartnerCash
- 2014: Manica Money
- 2015: ReallyUsefulCash

=== Affiliate Program – Gay ===
- 2011: (tie) Buddy Profits and PrideBucks

=== Affiliate Program of the Year – Multi-Platform ===
- 2011: CECash
- 2012: Gamma Entertainment
- 2013: Gamma Entertainment
- 2014: CECash

=== Affiliate Program – Porn Star ===
- 2011: FameDollars

=== Affiliate Program – Paysite ===
- 2018: Bang.com
- 2019: Bang.com

=== Affiliate Program of the Year – Retail ===
- 2011: FN Cash (Fleshlight)
- 2012: FN Cash
- 2013: GameLink
- 2014: Gamelink
- 2015: Gamelink
- 2016: AdultShopping.com
- 2017: GameLink
- 2018: AdultEmpireCash

=== Affiliate Program – Solo Girl ===
- 2011: TwistysCash
- 2012: TwistysCash

=== Affiliate Program of the Year – Specialty ===
- 2011: Joanna Angel Bucks
- 2013: GroobyBucks
- 2014: MrSkinCash (MrSkin.com)
- 2015: MrSkinCash (MrSkin.com)
- 2016: MrSkinCash
- 2017: MrSkinCash
- 2018: iStripper.com
- 2019: GroobyBucks

=== Affiliate Program – Studio ===
- 2011: Bang Bros (Bang Productions)

=== Affiliate Program – VOD ===
- 2012: AEBN

== All-Black ==
=== All-Black Release of the Year ===
- 2012: A Touch of Seduction (Wicked Pictures)
- 2013: Straight From My Heart (West Coast Productions)
- 2014: Black Heat (Jules Jordan Video)
- 2015: The Seduction of Skin Diamond (Devil's Film)
- 2016: Black Panthers 4 (Lexington Steele/Evil Angel)
- 2017: Big Black Wet Asses 14 (Elegant Angel)
- 2018: The Black Out (Jules Jordan Video)

=== All-Black Series ===
- 2012: Big Ass Cheaters (West Coast Productions)
- 2013: Club Elite (Elegant Angel)

== All-Girl ==
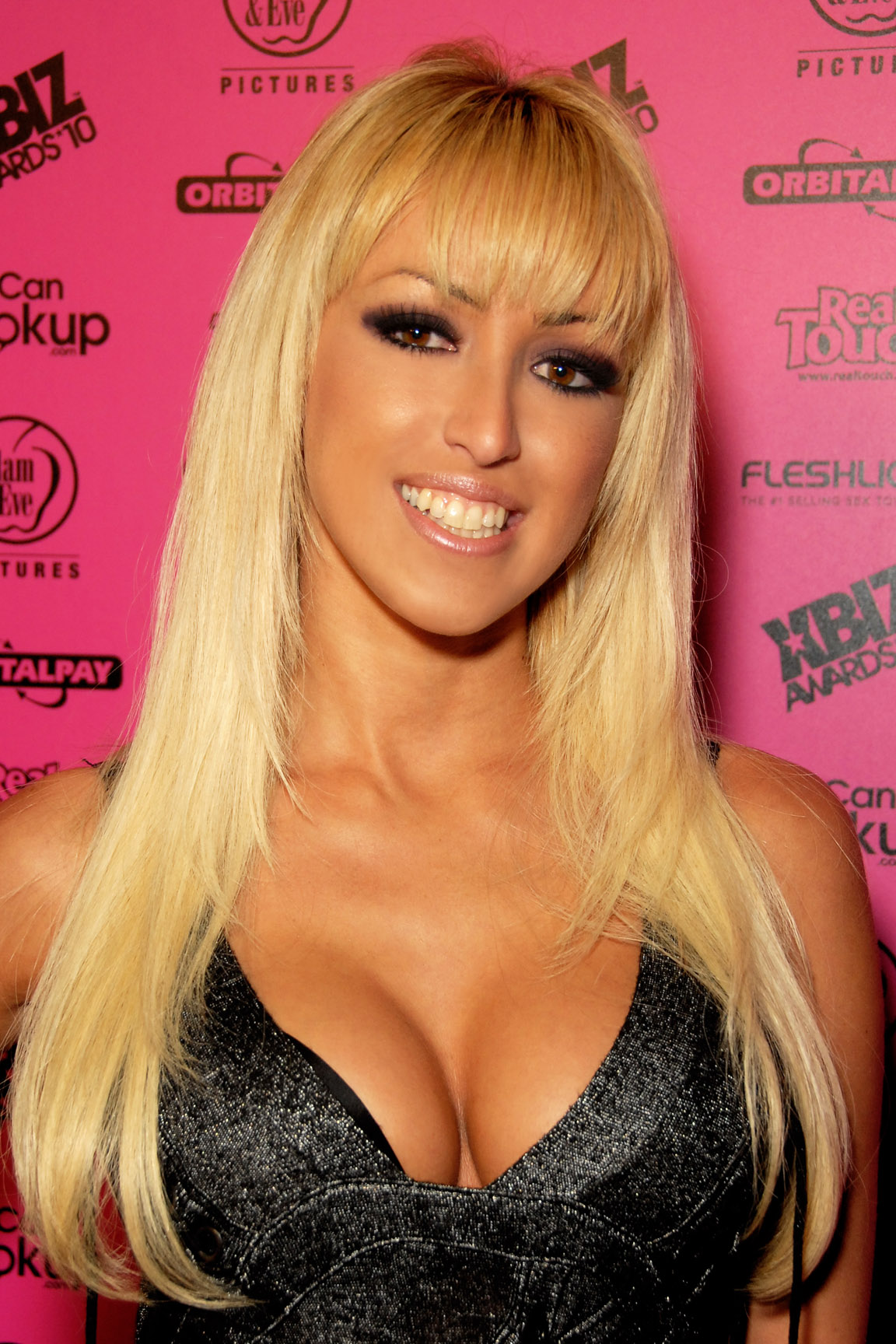
Breanne Benson at the 2010 XBIZ Awards

=== Release of the Year – Feature ===
- 2012: Cherry (JewelBox Films/Digital Playground)
- 2013: Girls With Girls (Abby Winters/Wicked Pictures)
- 2014: The Seduction of Riley Reid (Devil's Film)
- 2015: Alexis and Asa (Adam & Eve)
- 2016: The Business of Women (Girlsway/Girlfriends Films)
- 2017: Little Red: A Lesbian Fairytale (Girlsway)
- 2018: Vampires (Girlsway/Girlfriends Films)
- 2019: Fantasy Factory: Wastelands (Girlsway/Gamma Films)

=== Release of the Year – Non-Feature ===
- 2017: A Lesbian Romance 2 (New Sensations)
- 2018: Angela Loves Women 3 (AGW Entertainment/Girlfriends Films)
- 2019: Bare (Jules Jordan)

=== Series of the Year ===
- 2012: Budapest (Girlfriends Films)
- 2013: Lesbian Seductions (Girlfriends Films)
- 2014: Me and My Girlfriend (Girlfriends Films)
- 2015: Women Seeking Women (Girlfriends Films)
- 2016: Women Seeking Women (Girlfriends Films)
- 2017: Women Seeking Women (Girlfriends Films)
- 2018: Women Seeking Women (Girlfriends Films)
- 2019: Showcases (Girlsway/Gamma Films)

== All-Sex ==
=== All-Sex Release of the Year ===
- 2012: Performers of the Year 2011 (Elegant Angel)
- 2013: D3viance (Rock Star Entertainment/Adam & Eve Pictures)
- 2014: Whale Tale 6 (Smash Pictures)
- 2015: Meet Carter Cruise (Digital Sin)
- 2016: Big Booty Tryouts (Elegant Angel)
- 2017: Anal Beauty 3 (Tushy.com/Jules Jordan Video)
- 2018: The XXX Rub Down 2 (Digital Sin)
- 2019: Carnal (Wicked Pictures)

=== All-Sex Series of the Year ===
- 2012: Seasoned Players (Tom Byron Pictures)
- 2013: Pretty Dirty (New Sensations)
- 2014: Pretty Dirty (New Sensations)
- 2015: James Deen's 7 Sins (James Deen/Evil Angel)
- 2016: Angela (AGW Entertainment/Girlfriends Films)
- 2017: Anal Beauty (Tushy.com/Jules Jordan Video)

== Amateur/Pro-Am ==
=== Amateur Release of the Year ===
- 2012: Can He Score 8 (Bang Productions)
- 2013: Amateur Coeds 18 (Homegrown Video)
- 2014: Amateur College Girls 6 (Homegrown Video)
- 2015: Homegrown Video 850 (Homegrown Video)
- 2016: Homegrown Video Group Sex: The More the Merrier (Homegrown Video/Pure Play)
- 2017: Girls and Their Boys 22 (Abby Winters/Wicked Pictures)
- 2018: Adventures in Wife Sharing (Homegrown Video)
- 2019: I Want to Be a Pornstar (Beginners Luck/ArchAngel)

=== Amateur Series of the Year ===
- 2013 Fuck a Fan (Immoral Productions/Pure Play Media)

=== Pro-Am Release of the Year ===
- 2014: Mother's Indiscretion (Forbidden Fruits Films/Exile Distribution)
- 2015: Handjob Winner 18 (Immoral Productions/Pure Play Media)
- 2016: Kayden Kross's Casting Couch (Airerose Entertainment)
- 2017: Fuck a Fan 27 (Immoral Productions/Pure Play)
- 2018: Canadian Sex Trip 2 (James Deen Productions/Girlfriends Films)

== Asian-Themed ==
=== Asian-Themed Release of the Year ===
- 2012: Superstar Showdown 6: Asian Edition – Asa Akira vs. Katsuni (Reality Blue Media)
- 2013: I Am Asa (Pornstar Empire/Exile Distribution)
- 2014: I Am Asa 2 (Pornstar Empire/Exile)
- 2015: Kalina Ryu: Asian Fuck Toy (Darkko/Evil Angel)
- 2016: Starfall (Darkko/Evil Angel)
- 2017: Asian Fuck Machines (Jules Jordan Video)
- 2018: Asia Noir 7 (Video Team/Metro)

=== Asian-Themed Series ===
- 2012: Kamikaze Girls (Kamikaze Entertainment)
- 2013: Hello Titty (Third World Media)

== BDSM ==
=== BDSM Release of the Year ===
- 2014: Get My Belt (Pornfidelity/Juicy Entertainment)
- 2015: Maddy O'Reilly's Submission (Deviant Entertainment)
- 2016: Shades of Scarlet 2 (Zero Tolerance)
- 2017: Bound for Domination (Deviant Entertainment/Metro)
- 2018: Whipped Ass 21: Masochistic MILFs (Kink.com/Jules Jordan Video)
- 2019: Sex and Submission 2: Anal Bounty Hunter (Kink.com)

== Best Art Direction ==
- 2011: This Ain't Avatar XXX 3D (Hustler Video)
- 2012: The Rocki Whore Picture Show: A Hardcore Parody (Wicked Pictures)
- 2013: The Four (Adam & Eve Pictures)
- 2014: Underworld (Wicked Pictures)
- 2015: Wetwork (Vivid Entertainment)
- 2016: Wanted (Wicked Pictures/Adam & Eve Pictures)
- 2017: Storm of Kings (Brazzers)
- 2018: Justice League XXX: An Axel Braun Parody (Wicked Pictures)
- 2019: Fallen II: Angels & Demons (Wicked Pictures)

== Best Cinematography ==
- 2011: Francois Clousot, Jake Jacobs and Mark Nicholson, Speed (Wicked Pictures)
- 2012: Alex Ladd, Carlos Dee and Mason, Portrait of a Call Girl (Elegant Angel)
- 2013: Jinish Shah – Revenge of the Petites (AMKingdom/Exile Distribution)
- 2014: Alex Ladd, David Lord, Francois Clousot, Mark Nicholson and Paul Woodcrest, Underworld (Wicked Pictures)
- 2015: Alex Ladd, Eli Cross and Nic Danger, Wetwork (Vivid Entertainment)
- 2016: Alex Ladd, Marriage 2.0 (Lion Reach/Adam & Eve Pictures)
- 2017: Alex Ladd and Barrett Blade, DNA (Wicked Pictures)
- 2018: Half His Age: A Teenage Tragedy (PureTaboo/Pulse)
- 2019: Abigail (Tushy)
- 2020: Teenage Lesbian (Adult Time)

== Best Editing ==
- 2011: Voyeur Within (Studio A Entertainment) Andrew Blake
- 2012: Fighters (Digital Playground)
- 2013: Spartacus MMXII The Beginning (London-Gunn Films/Miko Lee Productions/Wicked Pictures)
- 2014: Underworld (Wicked Pictures) Scott Allen
- 2015: Wetwork (Vivid Entertainment), Robert April
- 2016: The Submission of Emma Marx 2: Boundaries (New Sensations), Eddie Powell and Gabrielle
- 2017: Little Red: A Lesbian Fairytale (Girlsway/Girlfriends Films)
- 2018: Half His Age: A Teenage Tragedy (PureTaboo/Pulse)
- 2019: Abigail (Tushy)
- 2020: Teenage Lesbian (Adult Time)

== Best Music ==
- 2013: Revenge of the Petites (AMKingdom/Exile Distribution)
- 2014: Grease XXX: A Parody (X-Play/Adam & Eve Pictures)
- 2015: Not Jersey Boys XXX (X-Play/Pulse)
- 2016: Wanted (Wicked Pictures/Adam & Eve Pictures)
- 2017: The Preacher's Daughter (Wicked Pictures)
- 2018: Agent 69 (Adam & Eve Pictures)
- 2019: Invictus (Sssh.com)

== Best Scene/Best Sex Scene ==
=== Best Scene – Feature Movie ===
- 2013: Lily Carter, Lily LaBeau, David Perry, Mick Blue, Ramón Nomar and Toni Ribas, Wasteland (Elegant Angel)
- 2014: Jesse Jane, Kayden Kross, Manuel Ferrara, Riley Steele, Selena Rose and Stoya, Code of Honor (Digital Playground)
- 2015: A.J. Applegate and Mr. Pete, Shades of Scarlet (Zero Tolerance)
- 2016: India Summer and Ryan Driller, Marriage 2.0 (Lion Reach/Adam & Eve Pictures)
- 2017: Anikka Albrite, Mick Blue and Sara Luvv, Babysitting the Baumgartners (Adam & Eve Pictures)
- 2018: Jessica Drake, Michael Vegas and Ryan Driller, An Inconvenient Mistress (Wicked Pictures)
- 2019: Kenzie Reeves and Small Hands, A Trailer Park Taboo — Part (Pure Taboo/Gamma Films)
- 2020: Ivy Lebelle, Maitland Ward & Manuel Ferrara, Drive (Deeper)
- 2022: Elena Koshka, Black Widow XXX: An Axel Braun Parody.

=== Best Scene – Parody/Comedy Release ===
- 2013: Brandy Aniston, Dick Chibbles and Eve Laurence, Star Wars XXX (Axel Braun Productions/Vivid Entertainment)
- 2014: Kendall Karson and Ryan Driller, Man of Steel XXX: An Axel Braun Parody (Vivid Entertainment)
- 2015: Aaliyah Love and Tommy Pistol, American Hustle XXX (Smash Pictures)
- 2016: Kimberly Kane and Ryan Driller, Wonder Woman XXX: An Axel Braun Parody (Vivid Entertainment)
- 2017: Anissa Kate, Jasmine Jae and Ryan Ryder, Storm of Kings (Brazzers)
- 2018: Abella Danger, Isiah Maxwell and Joanna Angel, Jews Love Black Cock (Burning Angel/Exile)
- 2019: Romi Rain & Small Hands, Metal Massage (Burning Angel)
- 2020: Jane Wilde, Kenzie Reeves, Kira Noir & Small Hands, 3 Cheers for Satan (Burning Angel)
- 2025: Christy Canyon, Serenity Cox, Brandi Love, Phoenix Marie, Maitland Ward and Jason Luv; American MILF (Vixen Media Group)

=== Best Scene – Gonzo/Non-Feature Release ===
- 2013: Chanel Preston and Nacho Vidal; Nacho Invades America 2 (Nacho Vidal/Evil Angel)
- 2014: Bonnie Rotten, Jordan Ash, Karlo Karrera, Mick Blue and Tony DeSergio, The Gangbang of Bonnie Rotten (Digital Sin)
- 2015: Adriana Chechik, Chris Strokes, Erik Everhard, James Deen, John Strong and Mick Blue, Gangbang Me (Hard)
- 2016: Jesse Jane and Manuel Ferrara, Jesse: Alpha Female (Jules Jordan Video)
- 2017: Ana Foxxx and Manuel Ferrara, Black Anal Asses (Hard X/OL Entertainment)
- 2018: Abella Danger and Markus Dupree, Fucking Flexible 2 (Toni Ribas/Evil Angel)
- 2019: Ginger Banks and Mick Blue, Cam Girls: The Movie (Evil Angel)
- 2020: Bridgette B, Jax Slayer & Rob Piper, Bridgette B Spanish Fuck Doll (Evil Angel)

=== Best Scene – All Sex Release ===
- 2016: Jada Stevens and Wesley Pipes, Interracial and Anal (Blacked.com/Jules Jordan)
- 2017: Jon Jon, Riley Reid and Toni Ribas, What's Next? (New Sensations)
- 2018: Ana Foxxx and Small Hands, Axel Braun's Brown Sugar (Wicked Pictures)
- 2019: Joanna Angel, Ricky Johnson, Isiah Maxwell and Prince Yahshua, Joanna Angel Gangbang: As Above, So Below (Burning Angel)
- 2020: Teanna Trump & Jason Luv, Blacked Raw V19 (Blacked)

=== Best Scene – Vignette Release ===
- 2013: Riley Steele and Erik Everhard, In Riley's Panties (Digital Playground)
- 2014: Jada Stevens and Kevin Moore, The Hooker Experience (Kevin Moore/Evil Angel)
- 2015: Ava Dalush and James Deen, I Love My Hot Wife (New Sensations)
- 2016: Dani Daniels, Luna Star, and Johnny Sins, Let's Play Doctor (Brazzers)
- 2017: Elsa Jean and Ryan Driller, All Natural Saints (Hustler Video)
- 2018: Katrina Jade, Charles Dera, Nigel Dictator, and Tommy Gunn, Sacrosanct (TrenchcoatX.com/Jules Jordan Video)
- 2019: Tori Black, Adriana Chechik, and Derrick Pierce, After Dark (Vixen)
- 2020: Jane Wilde, Emily Willis, and Prince Yahshua, Disciples of Desire: Bad Copy – Bad City (Jules Jordan Video)

=== Best Scene – Couples-Themed Release ===
- 2013: Lucky Starr and Xander Corvus, A Mother's Love 2 (Hard Candy Films/Pulse Distribution)
- 2014: Madison Ivy and Mick Blue, Hotel No Tell (Wicked Pictures)
- 2015: Anikka Albrite and Tommy Gunn, Untamed Heart (Adam & Eve Pictures)
- 2016: Riley Reid, Romi Rain and Xander Corvus, My Sinful Life (Dreamzone Entertainment)
- 2017: Katrina Jade and Xander Corvus, The Switch (B. Skow for Girlfriends Films)
- 2018: Gracie Glam and Ryan Driller, It's Complicated (Wicked Pictures)
- 2019: Gia Paige and Tyler Nixon, Love in the Digital Age (New Sensations)
- 2020: Abella Danger and Small Hands, Her & Him (Pornhub Premium)

=== Best Scene – All-Girl Release ===
- 2013; Jesse Jane, Kayden Kross, Riley Steele, Selena Rose and Vicki Chase; Mothers & Daughters (Digital Playground)
- 2014: Anissa Kate and Ariel Rebel, Ariel & Lola: Pornochic 24 (Marc Dorcel)
- 2015: Kayden Kross and Misha Cross, Misha Cross Wide Open (Manuel Ferrara/Evil Angel)
- 2016: Carter Cruise and Jessie Andrews, Jessie Loves Girls (Sweetheart Video/Mile High)
- 2017: Deauxma and Syren De Mer, Road Queen 35 (Girlfriends Films)
- 2018: Aidra Fox and Tori Black, Tori Black Is Back (Lesbian X)
- 2019: Janice Griffith and Ivy Wolfe, After Dark (Vixen)
- 2020: Charlotte Stokely and Kenna James, Confessions of a Sinful Nun 2: The Rise of Sister Mona (Sweetheart Video)
- 2022: Bunny Colby, Lesbian House Hunters 20 (Girlfriends Films)

=== Best Sex Scene – Taboo Release ===
- 2018: Angel Smalls and Isiah Maxwell, My Big Black Stepbrother (Toni Ribas/Evil Angel)
- 2019: Gia Paige and Michael Vegas, The Jealous Brother (Pure Taboo/Gamma Films)
- 2020: Bridgette B, Ivy Wolfe & Tyler Nixon, The Rules (MissaX)

=== Best Sex Scene - Clip Site ===
- 2019 Britney Amber, Kleio Valentien & Mark Rockwell, Britney and Kleio (ModelHub)

=== Best Sex Scene – Virtual Reality ===
- 2017: Riley Reid, On Set With Riley Reid (WankzVR)
- 2018: Bridgette B, The Wrong House to Rob (VR Bangers)
- 2019: Domino Presley, Moving in, Putting Out (GroobyVR)
- 2020: Adria Rae, Alex Blake, Gina Valentina, Lexi Lore, Maya Bijou, Taylor Blake & Tommy Gunn, Santa's Naughty List (WankzVR)

== Best Special Effects ==
- 2011: Bat FXXX: Dark Night (Bluebird Films)
- 2012: Top Guns (Digital Playground)
- 2013: Star Wars XXX (Axel Braun Productions/Vivid Entertainment)
- 2014: Underworld (Wicked Pictures)
- 2015: Apocalypse X (Digital Playground)
- 2016: Saving Humanity (AMKingdom)
- 2017: AI: Artificial Intelligence (Girlsway/Girlfriends Films)
- 2018: Star Wars Underworld: A XXX Parody (Digital Playground)
- 2019: Star Wars: The Last Temptation (Digital Playground)
- 2020: Captain Marvel XXX: An Axel Braun Parody, (Wicked Pictures)

== Comedy ==
=== Comedy Release of the Year ===
- 2018: Bad Babes Inc. (Adam & Eve Pictures)
- 2019: Deadpool XXX: An Axel Braun Parody (Wicked Pictures)
- 2020: Love Emergency, (Adam & Eve Pictures)
- 2025: American MILF (Vixen Media Group)

== Content Provider of the Year ==
- 2003: Matrix Content
- 2004: Video Secrets
- 2005: Matrix Content
- 2006: Webmaster Central
- 2007: World Wide Content
- 2012: AdultCentro
- 2013: AdultCentro
- 2014: AdultCentro
- 2015: Webmaster Central
- 2016: AdultCentro
- 2017: AdultCentro
- 2018: AdultSexContent

== Couples-Themed ==
=== Release of the Year ===
- 2012: Love is a Dangerous Game (New Sensations)
- 2013: Torn (New Sensations)
- 2014: Orgy University (Vivid Entertainment)
- 2015: The Sexual Liberation of Anna Lee (New Sensations)
- 2016: The Swing Life (New Sensations)
- 2017: Forked (Adam & Eve Pictures)
- 2018: Unbridled (Wicked Pictures)
- 2019: Love in the Digital Age (New Sensations)

=== Line of the Year ===
- 2013: Romance Series (New Sensations)
- 2014: Romance Series (New Sensations)

== Crossover Move/Crossover Star of the Year ==
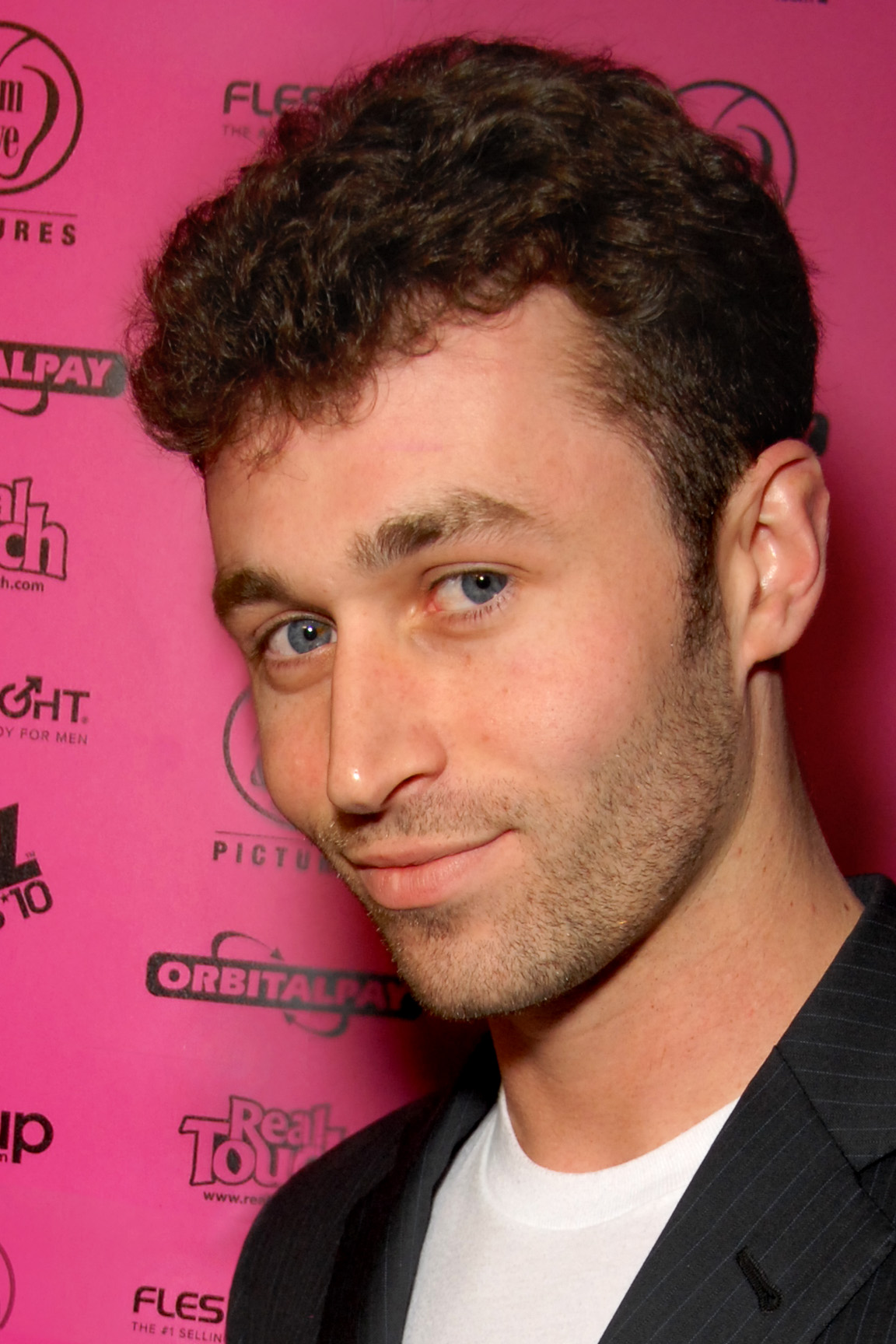
James Deen at the 2010 XBIZ Awards

- 2007: Joanna Angel
- 2009: Tera Patrick
- 2010: Sasha Grey
- 2011: Riley Steele
- 2012: Katsuni
- 2013: James Deen
- 2014: James Deen
- 2015: Nikki Benz
- 2016: Lisa Ann
- 2017: Dani Daniels
- 2018: Ela Darling
- 2019: Stormy Daniels
- 2020: Maitland Ward

=== Crossover Female Star ===
- 2008: Stormy Daniels

=== Crossover Male Star ===
- 2008: Evan Seinfeld

== Design Company ==
- 2003: Wyldesites
- 2004: Wyldesites
- 2005: Dickmans Design
- 2006: Wyldesites
- 2007: Wyldesites

== Design Studio of the Year ==
- 2008: Dickmans Design
- 2009: Dickmans Design
- 2010: Blue Design Studios
- 2011: (tie) Dickmans Design and Wyldesites
- 2012: (tie) AdultDesign and Zuzana Designs
- 2013: Wolume Studios
- 2014: Zuzana Designs
- 2015: Zuzana Designs
- 2016: Zuzana Designs
- 2017: Zuzana Designs

== Director of the Year ==
=== Director of the Year – Body of Work ===
- 2009: Belladonna
- 2010: Axel Braun
- 2011: Lee Roy Myers
- 2012: Robby D.
- 2013: Eddie Powell
- 2014: Axel Braun
- 2015: Jacky St. James
- 2016: Jacky St. James
- 2017: Greg Lansky
- 2018: Bree Mills
- 2019: Bree Mills
- 2020: Kayden Kross
- 2021: Kayden Kross
- 2022: Kayden Kross

=== Director of the Year – Individual Work/Feature Release ===
- 2009: Will Ryder, Not Bewitched XXX (X-Play/Adam & Eve Pictures)
- 2010: Brad Armstrong, 2040 (Wicked Pictures)
- 2012: Graham Travis, Portrait of a Call Girl (Elegant Angel)
- 2013: Graham Travis, Wasteland (Elegant Angel)
- 2014: Brad Armstrong, Underworld (Wicked Pictures)
- 2015: Eli Cross, Wetwork (Vivid Entertainment)
- 2016: Stormy Daniels, Wanted (Wicked Pictures/Adam & Eve Pictures)
- 2017: Brad Armstrong, The Preacher's Daughter (Wicked Pictures)
- 2018: Bree Mills
- 2019: Kayden Kross
- 2020: Bree Mills

=== Director of the Year – Non-Feature Release ===
- 2013: Mason, Lexi (Elegant Angel)
- 2014: Dana Vespoli, Girl/Boy (Dana Vespoli/Evil Angel)
- 2015: Kayden Kross and Manuel Ferrara, Misha Cross Wide Open (Manuel Ferrara/Evil Angel)
- 2016: Tori Black, True Lust (ArchAngel/Girlfriends Films)
- 2017: Greg Lansky, Anal Beauty (Tushy.com/Jules Jordan Video)
- 2018: Greg Lansky
- 2019: Greg Lansky
- 2020: Jonni Darkko

=== Director of the Year – Parody ===
- 2013: Axel Braun, Star Wars XXX (Axel Braun Productions/Vivid Entertainment)
- 2014: Will Ryder, Grease XXX: A Parody (X-Play/Adam & Eve Pictures)
- 2015: Will Ryder, Not the Jersey Boys XXX (X-Play/Pulse)
- 2016: Axel Braun, Batman vs. Superman XXX: An Axel Braun Parody (Wicked Pictures)
- 2017: Axel Braun, Suicide Squad XXX: An Axel Braun Parody (Wicked Pictures)

=== Director of the Year - Web ===
- 2019: MissaX

=== European/Foreign Director of the Year ===
- 2013: Max Candy
- 2014: Herve Bodilis
- 2015: Herve Bodilis
- 2016: Rocco Siffredi
- 2017: Rocco Siffredi
- 2018: Dick Bush
- 2019: Rocco Siffredi
- 2020: Rocco Siffredi

=== Emerging Studio ===
- 2007: Jules Jordan
- 2008: Harmony Films

== Ethnic Release ==
- 2011: Black Ass Master 4 (Alexander DeVoe/Jules Jordan)

== European/Foreign Release ==
=== Feature Release of the Year ===
- 2012: Les Filles de la Campagne (Marc Dorcel/Wicked Pictures)
- 2013: Inglorious Bitches (Marc Dorcel/Wicked Pictures)
- 2014: Claire Castel, The Chambermaid (Marc Dorcel)
- 2015: Russian Institute: Lesson 19: Holidays at My Parents (Marc Dorcel)
- 2016: How I Became a Sexual Slave (Marc Dorcel/Wicked Pictures)
- 2017: My Daughter Is A Whore (Marc Dorcel/Wicked Pictures)
- 2018: Revenge of a Daughter (Marc Dorcel/Wicked Pictures)
- 2019: Misha in Exile (Evil Angel)
- 2020: The Heist (Jacquie et Michel)

=== Non-Feature Release of the Year ===
- 2012: Slutty Girls Love Rocco 3 (Rocco Siffredi/Evil Angel)
- 2013: Slutty Girls Love Rocco 4 (Rocco Siffredi/Evil Angel)
- 2014: Cayenne Loves Rocco (Rocco Siffredi Productions/Evil Angel)
- 2015: The Initiation of Alina Li (Harmony Films)
- 2016: Do Not Disturb (Rebecca Lord Productions/Exile)
- 2017: Rocco Siffredi Hard Academy 1 (Rocco Siffredi/Evil Angel)
- 2018: Rocco's Perfect Slaves 11 (Rocco Siffredi/Evil Angel)
- 2019: Rocco Siffreidi Hard Academy (Evil Angel)

== Executive Leadership Award ==
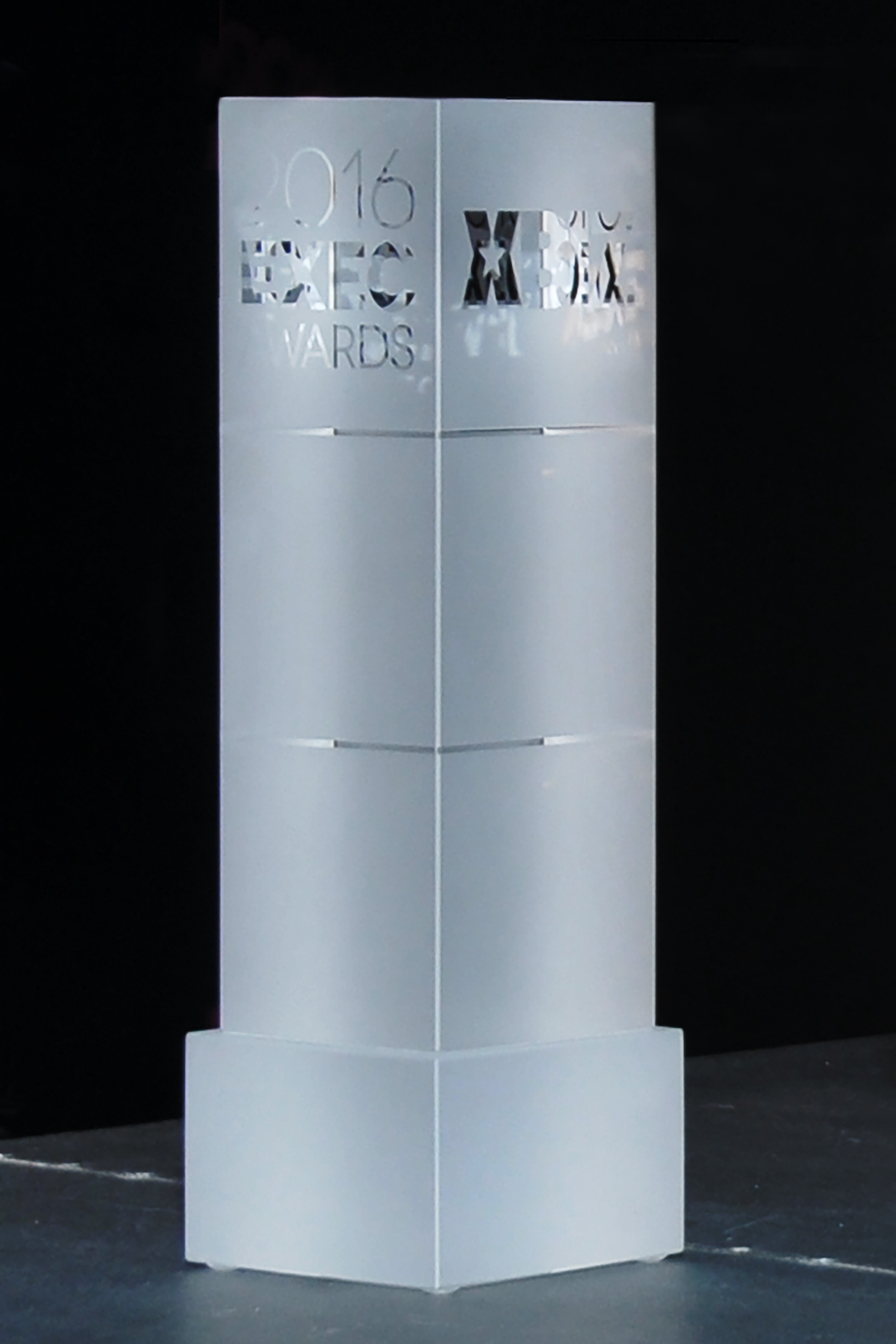
XBIZ Executive Leadership Award

- 2009: Michael Klein (LFP, Inc.)
- 2010: Mark Franks (Castle Megastore)

=== Executive Leadership – Retail ===
- 2011: Theresa Flynt (Hustler Hollywood)

=== Executive Leadership – Video ===
- 2011: Moose (Girlfriends Films)

=== Executive Leadership – Web ===
- 2011: Brad Estes (Video Secrets) and Harmik Gharapetian (Epoch)
- 2012: Gary Jackson (CCBill)

== Feature Director ==
- 2008: Dcypher

== Feature Movie of the Year ==
- 2008: Upload (SexZ Pictures)
- 2009: Pirates II: Stagnetti's Revenge (Digital Playground)
- 2010: The 8th Day (Adam & Eve Pictures)
- 2011: Speed (Wicked Pictures)
- 2012: Portrait of a Call Girl (Elegant Angel)
- 2013: Wasteland (Elegant Angel)
- 2014: Underworld (Wicked Pictures)
- 2015: Wetwork (Vivid Entertainment)
- 2016: Wanted (Wicked Pictures/Adam & Eve Pictures)
- 2017: The Preacher's Daughter (Wicked Pictures)
- 2018: Half His Age: A Teenage Tragedy (PureTaboo/Pulse)
- 2019: Abigale (Tushy)
- 2020: No Mercy for Mankind (Digital Playground)
- 2021: Muse (Deeper)

== Female Performer of the Year ==
- 2008: Eva Angelina
- 2009: Jenna Haze
- 2010: Tori Black
- 2011: Andy San Dimas
- 2012: Asa Akira
- 2013: Brooklyn Lee
- 2014: Riley Reid
- 2015: Anikka Albrite
- 2016: Dani Daniels
- 2017: Katrina Jade
- 2018: Romi Rain
- 2019: Abigail Mac
- 2020: Angela White
- 2021: Emily Willis
- 2022: Emily Willis
- 2023: Vanna Bardot
- 2024: Vanna Bardot
- 2025: Anna Claire Clouds
- 2026: Jennifer White

=== Foreign Female Performer of the Year ===
- 2011: Katsuni
- 2012: Anna Polina
- 2013: Erica Fontes
- 2014: Cayenne Klein
- 2015: Misha Cross
- 2016: Angela White
- 2017: Valentina Nappi
- 2018: Stella Cox
- 2019: Ella Hughes
- 2020: Tina Kay

=== Girl/Girl Performer of the Year ===
- 2014: April O'Neil
- 2015: Prinzzess
- 2016: Vanessa Veracruz
- 2017: Jenna Sativa (Spiegler)
- 2018: Darcie Dolce
- 2019: Charlotte Stokely
- 2020: Charlotte Stokely
- 2021: Scarlett Sage
- 2022: Kenna James
- 2023: Aiden Ashley
- 2024: Gizelle Blanco
- 2025: Lily Phillips
- 2026: Octavia Red

== Feminist Porn ==
=== Release of the Year ===
- 2014: Occupied (Pink and White Productions)
- 2015: San Francisco Lesbians (Trouble Films/Pink Velvet)

== Fetish ==
=== Fetish Release of the Year ===
- 2012: Odd Jobs 5 (Belladonna Entertainment/Evil Angel)
- 2013: Fetish Fanatic 10 (Belladonna Entertainment/Evil Angel)
- 2014: Samantha 38G & Friends 2 (Sensational Video)
- 2015: To the Core (Mental Beauty/Girlfriends Films)
- 2016: Comic Book Freaks and Cosplay Geeks (Burning Angel/Exile)
- 2017: Lesbian Anal Sex Slaves 2 (Aiden Starr/Evil Angel)
- 2018: Corrupted by the Evils of Fetish Porn (Severe Sex)
- 2019: Mind Fucked: A Cult Classic (Severe Sex Films)

== Gonzo ==
=== Gonzo Director ===
- 2008: Jules Jordan

=== Gonzo Release of the Year ===
- 2009: Performers of the Year (Elegant Angel)
- 2010: Pornstar Workout (Elegant Angel)
- 2011: Pornstar Workout (Elegant Angel)
- 2012: Asa Akira Is Insatiable 2 (Elegant Angel)
- 2013: Lexi (Elegant Angel)
- 2014: Skin (Elegant Angel)
- 2015: Ass Worship 15 (Jules Jordan Video)
- 2016: Anikka's Anal Sluts (BAM Visions/Evil Angel)
- 2017: Mick Loves Anikka (BAM Visions/Evil Angel)
- 2018: Inked Nation (Jules Jordan Video)
- 2019: A XXX Documentary (PornFidelity)
- 2020: Angela Loves Anal 2 (AGW Entertainment)

=== Gonzo Release – Non-Feature ===
- 2011: Tori, Tarra and Bobbi Love Rocco (Rocco Siffredi/Evil Angel)

=== Gonzo Series of the Year ===
- 2008: Jack's Playground (Digital Playground)
- 2009: Performers of the Year (Evil Angel)
- 2010: Big Tits Round Asses (Bang Productions)
- 2011: Big Wet Asses (Elegant Angel)
- 2012: Phat Bottom Girls (Manuel Ferrara/Evil Angel)
- 2013: Ultimate Fuck Toy (Jules Jordan Video)
- 2014: Internal Damnation (Jules Jordan Video)
- 2015: Bang Bus (Bang Productions)
- 2016: The Booty Movie (ArchAngel/Girlfriends Films)
- 2017: Angela Loves... (AGW Entertainment/Girlfriends Films)
- 2018: Angela Loves... (AGW Entertainment/Girlfriends Films)
- 2019: True Anal... (TrueAnal.com)
- 2020: Slut Puppies (Jules Jordan Video)

== Industry Contribution ==
- 2008: Sharon Mitchell
- 2009: Phil Harvey (Adam & Eve)

== Interracial ==
=== Interracial Release of the Year ===
- 2011: Lex the Impaler 5 (Jules Jordan Video)
- 2012: Lex the Impaler 7 (Jules Jordan Video)
- 2013: Prince the Penetrator (Smash Pictures)
- 2014: The Housewives of Lexington Steele (DreamZone Entertainment)
- 2015: Dani Daniels Deeper (Blacked.com/Jules Jordan Video)
- 2016: Carter Cruise Obsession (Blacked.com/Jules Jordan Video)
- 2017: Interracial Orgies (Blacked.com/Jules Jordan Video)
- 2018: Interracial Icon 5 (Blacked.com/Jules Jordan Video)

=== Interracial Series ===
- 2012: Interracial Swingers (Devil's Film)
- 2013: Mandingo Massacre (Jules Jordan Video)

== Latin-Themed ==
=== Latin-Themed Release of the Year ===
- 2012: Made in Xspana 7 (Nacho Vidal/Evil Angel)
- 2013: Made in Xspana 8 (Nacho Vidal/Evil Angel)
- 2014: Chongas 5 (Bang Productions)
- 2015: Latinas on Fire 2 (Jules Jordan Video)
- 2016: Colombian Fuckfest (Bang Productions)
- 2017: Colombian Fuck Fest 4 (Bang Productions)
- 2018: Nacho Loves Canela Skin (Nacho Vidal/Evil Angel)

=== Latin-Themed Series ===
- 2012: Latin Adultery (Naughty America)
- 2013: Latin Adultery (Naughty America/Pure Play Media)

== LGBT Awards ==
The LGBT in the title refers to lesbian, gay, bisexual and transsexual people.

=== Gay Web Company/Brand of the Year ===
- 2009: Maleflixxx.tv
- 2010: Buddy Profits
- 2011: Lucas Entertainment
- 2012: Naked Sword
- 2013: Dominic Ford
- 2014: Next Door Entertainment/Buddy Profits
- 2015: Next Door Entertainment/Buddy Profits
- 2016: Cybersocket
- 2017: NakedSword
- 2018: NakedSword
- 2019: Helix Studios
- 2020: Chaturbate

=== Company ===
- 2005: Cybersocket
- 2006: Cybersocket
- 2007: Cybersocket
- 2008: PrideBucks
- 2009: Cybersocket

=== Director of the Year ===
- 2008: Michael Lucas and Tony Dimarco
- 2009: Ben Leon, Chris Ward and Tony Dimarco
- 2010: Steven Scarborough
- 2011: Joe Gage
- 2012: Chris Ward
- 2014: Jake Jaxson
- 2015: Jake Jaxson
- 2016: Joe Gage
- 2017: mr. Pam
- 2018: mr. Pam
- 2019: Bruce LaBruce
- 2020: Jake Jaxson
- 2021: Marc MacNamara
- 2022: Jake Jaxson
- 2023: Tony Dimarco
- 2024: Siouxsie Q and Michael Vegas
- 2025: Marc MacNamara

=== Gay Feature Movie of the Year ===
- 2008: Link: The Evolution (Channel 1 Releasing)
- 2009: To the Last Man (Raging Stallion Studios)
- 2010: Focus/Refocus (Raging Stallion Studios)
- 2011: Brutal (Raging Stallion Studios)
- 2012: Assassin (Lucas Entertainment)
- 2013: Incubus Parts 1 & 2 (Titan Media)
- 2014: Original Sinners (Lucas Entertainment)
- 2015: A Thing of Beauty (CockyBoys)
- 2016: Answered Prayers (CockyBoys)
- 2017: One Erection (CockyBoys)
- 2018: MXXX: The Hardest Ride (NakedSword Originals)
- 2019: Flea Pit (CockyBoys)
- 2020: All Saints: Chapter One (CockyBoys)
- 2021: A Murdered Heart (NakedSword Originals)
- 2022: The Last Course (Disruptive Films)
- 2023: Ride or Die (Raging Stallion Studios)
- 2024: For You, I Will (Disruptive Films)
- 2025: Honeyguide (Disruptive Films)

=== Gay Non-Narrative Movie of the Year ===
- 2024: Tongue in Cheek (Raging Stallion Studios)
- 2025: Global Entry: South Africa (NakedSword Originals)

=== Gay Performer of the Year ===
- 2008: Jake Deckard
- 2009: Jackson Wild
- 2010: (tie) Logan McCree and Tyler Saint
- 2011: Spencer Reed
- 2012: Adam Killian
- 2013: Trenton Ducati
- 2014: Jessy Ares
- 2015: Landon Conrad
- 2016: Rocco Steele
- 2017: Sean Zevran
- 2018: Colby Keller
- 2019: Francois Sagat
- 2020: Pierce Paris
- 2021: Max Konnor
- 2022: Michael Boston
- 2023: Dillon Diaz
- 2024: Derek Kage
- 2025: Derek Kage
- 2026: Derek Kage

=== Gay Studio of the Year ===
- 2008: Titan Media
- 2009: Titan Media
- 2010: Titan Media
- 2011: Titan Media
- 2012: Titan Media
- 2013: Lucas Entertainment
- 2014: CockyBoys
- 2015: Bel Ami
- 2016: CockyBoys
- 2017: NakedSword Originals
- 2018: NakedSword Originals
- 2019: NakedSword Originals
- 2020: NakedSword Originals

=== Transsexual/Transgender Director of the Year ===
- 2012: Joey Silvera
- 2013: Jay Sin
- 2014: Joey Silvera
- 2015: Joey Silvera
- 2016: Joey Silvera
- 2017: Nica Noelle
- 2018: Dana Vespoli
- 2019: Aiden Starr
- 2020: Ricky Greenwood
- 2021: Ricky Greenwood
- 2022: Ricky Greenwood
- 2023: Buddy Wood
- 2024: Stella Smut
- 2025: Stella Smut

=== Transsexual/Transgender Performer of the Year ===
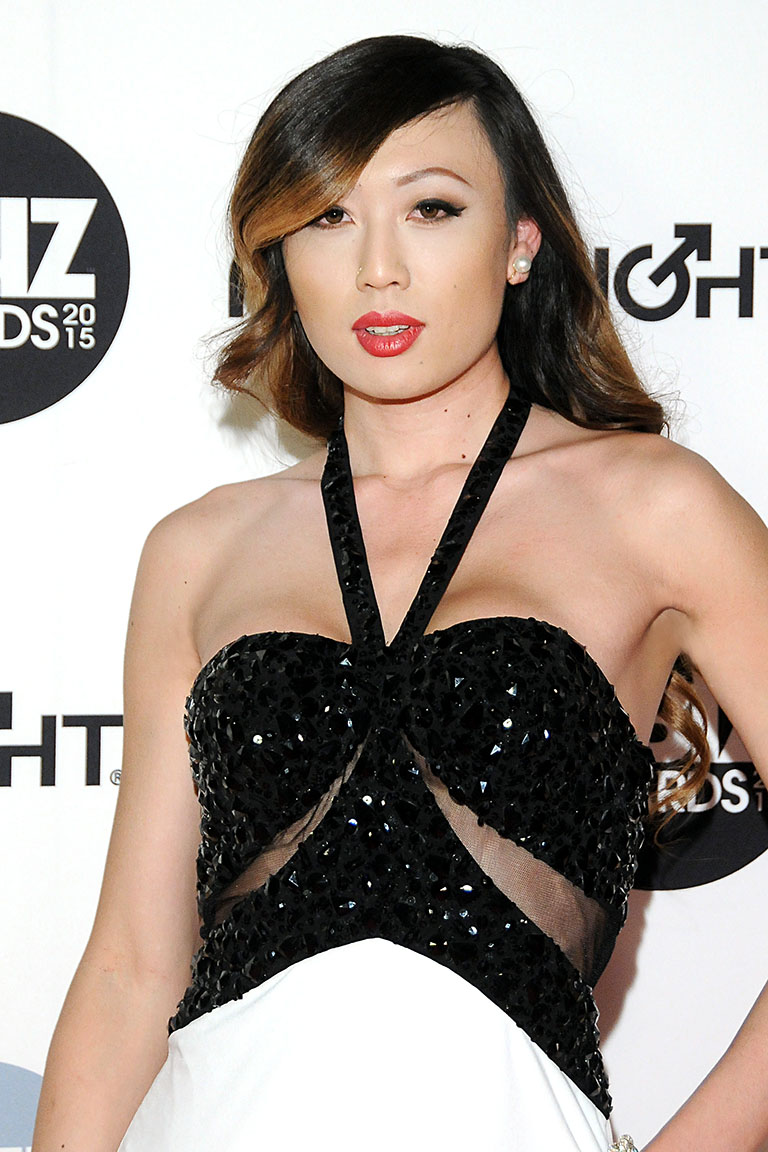
Venus Lux at 2015 XBiz Awards

- 2010: Wendy Williams
- 2011: Mia Isabella
- 2012: Jesse Flores
- 2013: Eva Lin
- 2014: Venus Lux
- 2015: Venus Lux
- 2016: Jessy Dubai
- 2017: Aubrey Kate
- 2018: Chanel Santini
- 2019: Chanel Santini
- 2020: Natalie Mars
- 2021: Casey Kisses
- 2022: Casey Kisses
- 2023: Emma Rose
- 2024: Emma Rose
- 2025: Ariel Demure

=== Transsexual/Transgender Release of the Year ===
- 2010: My Girlfriend's Cock 5 (Red Light District Video)
- 2011: America's Next Top Tranny: Season 6 (Goodfellas/Devil's Film)
- 2012: She-male Police 2 (Joey Silvera/Evil Angel)
- 2013: Mia Isabella: Want Some Honey? Vol. 2 (SMC Productions)
- 2014: American She-Male X 5 (Joey Silvera Productions/Evil Angel)
- 2015: Big Tit She-Male X 2 (Joey Silvera/Evil Angel)
- 2016: Kaitlyn Gender: Based on a Not So True Story (Trans500/Pure Play)
- 2017: Real Fucking Girls (Grooby Productions/Third World Media)
- 2018: Buck Angel Superstar (TransSensual/Mile High)
- 2019: Aubrey Kate Plus 8 (Evil Angel)
- 2020: Transfixed: Natalie Mars Showcase (Adult Time)
- 2021: Tranimals (Evil Angel)
- 2022: I Am Aubrey (Evil Angel)
- 2023: My TS Stepsister 6 (TransSensual)
- 2024: Office Ms. Conduct (Transfixed)
- 2025: D.O.L.L.S. (Transfixed)

=== Transsexual/Transgender Studio of the Year ===
- 2012: Grooby Productions
- 2013: Third World Media
- 2014: Trans 500
- 2015: Evil Angel
- 2016: Evil Angel
- 2017: Grooby Productions
- 2018: Grooby Productions
- 2019: Trans Angels
- 2020: Evil Angel

=== Live Cam Model of the Year ===
- 2016: Ashe Maree
- 2017: Devious Angel
- 2018: Jenny Blighe

== Male Performer of the Year ==
- 2008: Evan Stone
- 2009: Manuel Ferrara
- 2010: James Deen
- 2011: Tommy Gunn
- 2013: James Deen
- 2014: James Deen
- 2015: James Deen
- 2016: Ryan Driller
- 2017: Xander Corvus
- 2018: Small Hands
- 2019: Isiah Maxwell
- 2020: Seth Gamble
- 2021: Ramon Nomar

=== Foreign Male Performer of the Year ===
- 2011: Rocco Siffredi
- 2012: Nacho Vidal
- 2013: Toni Ribas
- 2014: Danny D
- 2015: Rocco Siffredi
- 2016: Danny D
- 2017: Jessy Jones
- 2018: Steve Holmes
- 2019: Steve Holmes
- 2020: Danny D

== Marketing Campaign of the Year ==
- 2018: Vixen Angel of the Month/Year (Vixen.com)
- 2019: Brazzers House (Brazzers)
- 2020: I Am Riley (Evil Angel)

== MILF Performer of the Year ==
- 2011: Lisa Ann
- 2012: India Summer
- 2013: Tanya Tate
- 2014: Julia Ann
- 2015: Kendra Lust
- 2016: Kendra Lust
- 2017: Cherie DeVille
- 2018: Brandi Love
- 2019: Bridgette B
- 2020: Bridgette B
- 2021: Cherie DeVille
- 2022: Alexis Fawx
- 2023: Reagan Foxx
- 2024: Lauren Phillips
- 2025: Penny Barber
- 2026: Sophia Locke

== Movie Production ==
- 2008: Gerard Damiano

== New Male Performer/Best Male Newcomer of the Year ==
- 2010: Dane Cross
- 2011: Flash Brown
- 2012: Xander Corvus
- 2014: Tyler Nixon
- 2016: Axel Aces
- 2017: Wes Meadows (Vacated)
- 2018: Lucas Frost
- 2019: Jason Luv
- 2020: Pressure

== New Series of the Year ==
- 2013: Tonight's Girlfriend (Naughty America/Pure Play)

== Parody Release of the Year ==
=== Parody Release of the Year – Comedy ===
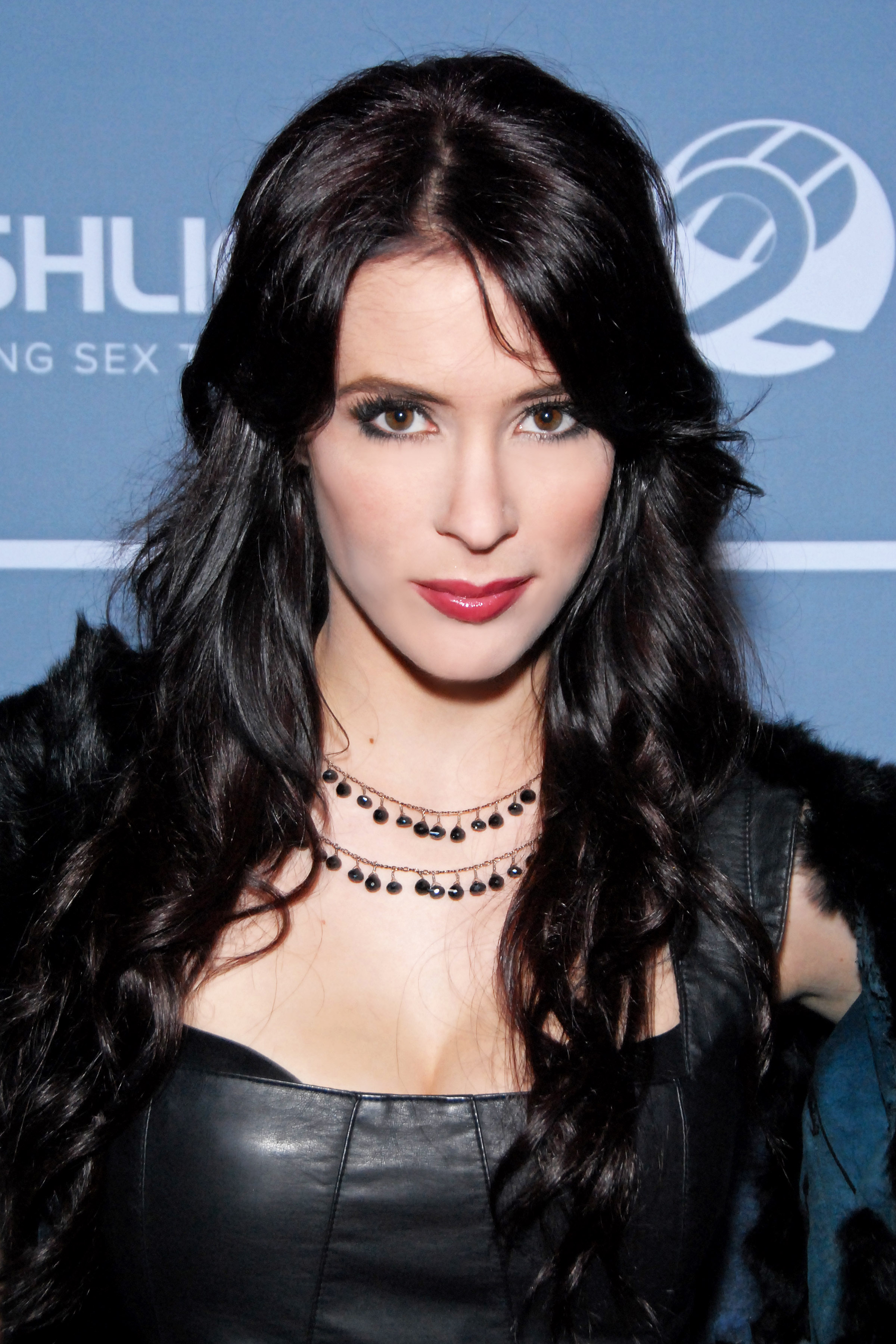
Aiden Ashley at the 2012 XBIZ Award show

- 2010: Not the Bradys XXX: Marcia, Marcia (X-Play/Hustler Video)
- 2012: Beverly Hillbillies XXX (X-Play/Adam & Eve)
- 2013: Star Wars XXX: A Porn Parody (Axel Braun Productions/Vivid Entertainment)
- 2014: Grease XXX: A Parody (X-Play/Adam & Eve)
- 2015: Not the Jersey Boys XXX (X-Play/Pulse)

=== Parody Release of the Year – Drama ===
- 2012: Top Guns (Digital Playground)
- 2013: Inglorious Bitches (Marc Dorcel/Wicked Pictures)
- 2014: Superman vs. Spider-Man: An Axel Braun Parody (Vivid Entertainment)
- 2015: Cinderella XXX: An Axel Braun Parody (Wicked Pictures)
- 2016: Batman v. Superman XXX: An Axel Braun Parody (Wicked Pictures)
- 2017: Suicide Squad XXX: An Axel Braun Parody (Wicked Pictures)

== People's Choice Awards ==
=== Female Porn Star of the Year ===
- 2010: Teagan Presley

=== Male Porn Star of the Year ===
- 2010: Tom Byron

=== Best New Starlet of the Year ===
- 2010: Tanner Mayes

=== Feature Movie of the Year ===
- 2010: The 8th Day (Adam & Eve)

=== Gonzo Movie of the Year ===
- 2010: Tori Black is Pretty Filthy (Elegant Angel)
- 2020: My Name is Zaawaadi (Evil Angel)

=== Porn Parody of the Year ===
- 2010: The Office: A XXX Parody (New Sensations)

=== Porn Site of the Year ===
- 2010: Twistys.com

=== Porn Studio of the Year ===
- 2010: Wicked Pictures

=== Porn Director of the Year ===
- 2010: Will Ryder

=== Web Babe of the Year ===
- 2010: Ariel Rebel

== Performer of the Year ==
- 2021: Dante Colle
- 2022: Maitland Ward
- 2023: Cherie DeVille
- 2024: Seth Gamble

== Performer Comeback of the Year ==
- 2010: Dyanna Lauren
- 2011: Dale DaBone
- 2012: Prince Yahshua
- 2013: Steven St. Croix

== Performer Showcase of the Year ==
- 2016: Jesse Jane, Jesse: Alpha Female (Jules Jordan Video)
- 2017: A.J. Applegate, The Booty Queen 2 (Arch Angel)
- 2018: Katrina Jade, I Am Katrina (Evil Angel)
- 2019: Abigail Mac, Abigail (Tushy)
- 2020: Riley Reid, I Am Riley (Evil Angel)
- 2022: Gianna Dior, Psychosexual
- 2023: April Olsen, April Olsen Knows Best
- 2024: Vanna Bardot, Influence: Vanna Bardot
- 2025: Angela White, Fuck Angela
- 2026: Jennifer White, Hollywood Whore

== Pleasure Products ==
=== Adult Game/Bachelorette Product of the Year ===
- 2014: Masturbating Midget-Man Wind-Up Doll (Pipedream Products)
- 2015: 50 Positions of Bondage (Kheper Games)
- 2016: Adult Charades, (Kheper Games)
- 2017: Glow in the Dark Sex (Kheper Games)
- 2018: Acts of Insanity (Kheper Games)
- 2019: Mind, Body & Soul, Kheper Games

=== Bachelor/Bachelorette Product of the Year ===
- 2016: SnorkelO (The Screaming O)
- 2017: Donald Chump Love Doll (Pipedream Products)
- 2018: Pet Cock Willy (It's the Bomb)
- 2019: Sweet & Sexy Candy Posing Pouch, Hott Products

=== BDSM Pleasure Products Company of the Year ===
- 2012: Sportsheets
- 2013: XR Brands
- 2014: Rapture Novelties
- 2015: Sportsheets
- 2016: The Stockroom
- 2017: Sportsheets International
- 2018: Cyrex
- 2019: The Stockroom

=== BDSM Soft Bondage Product/Line of the Year ===
- 2018: Fifty Shades Freed The Official Pleasure Collection (Lovehoney)
- 2019: Enchanted Collection, Sportsheets

=== Condom Manufacturer of the Year ===
- 2018: Paradise Marketing
- 2019: Paradise Marketing

=== Couples Sex Toy of the Year ===
- 2015: We-Vibe 4 Plus (Standard Innovation Corporation)
- 2016: Passionate Play Collection (We-Vibe)
- 2017: We-Vibe Sync (We-Vibe)
- 2018: Pivot (We-Vibe)
- 2019: Vac-U-Lock - Total Penetration Set, Doc Johnson

=== Crossover Novelty Company ===
- 2011: The Screaming O

=== Excellence in Product Packaging ===
- 2018: Jimmyjane
- 2019: ZALO

=== Fetish Product/Line of the Year ===
- 2014: Expandable Spreader Bar and Cuffs Set (Sportsheets)
- 2015: Fetish Fantasy Series Lube Wrestling Ring (Pipedream Products)
- 2016: Master Series (XR Brands)
- 2017: Master Series (XR Brands)
- 2018: Kink (Doc Johnson)
- 2019: Master Series, XR Brands

=== Innovative Product of the Year ===
- 2004: StatsRemote
- 2005: Members Area System (Mansion Productions LLC)
- 2010: Real Touch (AEBN)

=== Innovative Sex Toy of the Year – Design ===
- 2016: Form 5 (Jimmyjane)
- 2017: Nova (We-Vibe)
- 2018: Mimic (Clandestine Devices)
- 2019: Satisfyer Pro Traveler, Satisfyer

=== Innovative Sex Toy of the Year – Technology ===
- 2016: Womanizer, epi24
- 2017: Technology Womanizer Pro40 (epi24)
- 2018: The Fleshlight Launch (Kiiroo)
- 2019: Lovely 0, Lovely

=== LGBT Pleasure Products Company of the Year ===
- 2016: Spareparts Hardwear
- 2017: OxBalls
- 2018: Perfect Fit Brand
- 2019: OXBALLS

=== LGBT/Gay/Lesbian Sex Toy/Line of the Year ===
- 2013: Fleshjack (Fleshlight)
- 2014: American Bombshell B-10 Warhead (Doc Johnson)
- 2015: Jock Armout (Perfect Fit Brand)
- 2016: Fleshjack (Fleshlight)
- 2017: Tom of Finland (XR Brands)
- 2018: Sackjack (Oxballs)
- 2019: (Gay) Milan Christopher Dildo Fleshjack, Fleshlight

=== Lingerie/Apparel Collection of the Year ===
- 2013: Fetish Fantasy Lingerie (Pipedream Products)
- 2014: Signature Collection (Rene Rofe)
- 2015: After Dark (Baci Lingerie)
- 2016: Curve (Fantasy Lingerie)
- 2017: Baci Dreams (Baci Lingerie)
- 2018: Ariane (Coco de Mer)
- 2019: Adore, Allure Lingerie

=== Lingerie/Apparel Company of the Year ===
- 2011: Baci Lingerie
- 2012: Baci Lingerie
- 2013: Hustler Lingerie
- 2014: Dreamgirl International
- 2015: Magic Silk
- 2016: Coquette
- 2017: Magic Silk
- 2018: Baci Lingerie
- 2019: Baci Lingerie

=== Luxury Pleasure Product/Line of the Year ===
- 2018: Mimic (Clandestine Devices)
- 2019: Premium, Womanizer

=== Luxury Brand of the Year ===
- 2018: Le Wand
- 2019: LELO

=== Male Pleasure Products Company of the Year ===
- 2016: Perfect Fit Brand
- 2017: Fleshlight International
- 2018: Sir Richard's
- 2019: Satisfyer Men Heat Vibration, Satisfyer

=== Male Sex Toy/Line of the Year ===
- 2012: Hand Solo (Rocks-Off)
- 2013: Helix Syn (Aneros)
- 2014: Flight Pilot (Fleshlight)
- 2015: Pulse II (Hot Octopuss)
- 2016: CyberSkin Twerking Butt (Topco Sales)
- 2017: BLEWIT (blewit!)
- 2018: Pulse III (Hot Octopuss)

=== Marketing Campaign of the Year ===
- 2018: New Generation (Satisfyer)
- 2019: System JO 5th Anniversary

=== New Pleasure Products Company of the Year ===
- 2012: Wet For Her
- 2013: Masque
- 2014: BodiSpa
- 2015: Kiiroo
- 2016: Shots America
- 2017: b-Vibe
- 2018: Clandestine Devices
- 2019: Rock Candy Toys

=== Novelty/Sex Toy Company of the Year ===
- 2006: Doc Johnson
- 2007: California Exotic Novelties LLC
- 2008: PHS International
- 2012: BMS Factory
- 2013: Fun Factory
- 2014: Standard Innovation Corporation

=== Pleasure Products Company of the Year – Boutique ===
- 2018: Hot Octopuss
- 2019: Clandestine Devices

=== Pleasure Products Company of the Year – Full Range ===
- 2011: Cobra Libre (Fun Factory USA)
- 2012: Pipedream Products
- 2013: LELO
- 2014: Lovehoney
- 2015: LELO
- 2016: California Exotic Novelties
- 2017: Doc Johnson'
- 2018: Doc Johnson
- 2019: CalExotics

=== Pleasure Products Company of the Year – International ===
- 2012: Shunga
- 2015: Fun Factory
- 2016: Fun Factory
- 2017: Fun Factory
- 2018: Lovehoney
- 2019: Lovehoney

=== Pleasure Products Company of the Year – Progressive ===
- 2018: Dame Products
- 2019: COTR

=== Pleasure Products Company of the Year – Sex Toys ===
- 2016: We-Vibe
- 2017: Fun Factory
- 2018: Satisfyer
- 2019: Blush Novelties

=== Sensual Accessory Product/Line of the Year ===
- 2018: Nipple Play, CalExotic
- 2019: Desir Metallique, Bijoux Indiscrets

=== Sensual Bath & Body Product of the Year ===
- 2018: Naturals Sensual Massage Oil (Kama Sutra)
- 2019: Crystal Massage Oil - Amethyst Sweet Almond, Exsens

=== Sex Doll Brand of the Year ===
- 2019: Ultimate Fantasy Dolls, Pipedream Products

=== Sex Enhancement Product of the Year ===
- 2018: Ginger Litchi Arousal Gel (Exsens)
- 2019: Pleasure, Foria

=== Sex Lubricant of the Year ===
- 2018: Silver Studio Collection (Sliquid)
- 2019: pjur med Soft glide, pjur

=== Sex Lubricant Company of the Year ===
- 2018: Sliquid
- 2019: Wet Lubricants

=== Sex Toy of the Year – Powered/Vibrating ===
- 2014: nü Sensuelle Impulse
- 2015: Hula Beads (LELO)
- 2016: Magic Wand Rechargeable, (Vibratex)
- 2017: Pro Penguin (Satisfyer)
- 2018: Touch Extreme Vibrations (Nasstoys)
- 2019: Tri-It, Screaming O

=== Sex Toy of the Year – Powered/Non-Vibrating ===
- 2018: Womanizer 2GO, (Womanizer)
- 2019: Stronic Surf Pulsator 2, Fun Factory

=== Sex Toy of the Year – Non-Powered ===
- 2014: Ceramix Pleasure Pottery No. 4 (Pipedream)
- 2015: D.1 Stone (Laid)
- 2016: Icicles Gold G1, (Pipedream Products)
- 2017: King Cock Plus (Pipedream Products)
- 2018: Chrystalino Treasure, (Shots America)
- 2019: Trident Series, Aneros

=== Sexual Health and Wellness Brand of the Year ===
- 2018: pjur Group USA
- 2019: Sliquid

=== Sexual Health and Wellness Product of the Year ===
- 2018: Fun Cup (Fun Factory)
- 2019: Menstrual Cups, Jimmyjane

=== Specialty Pleasure Product/Line of the Year ===
- 2014: Hydromax (Bathmate)
- 2015: Bubble Love (Bubble Love)
- 2016: Clone-A-Willy Plus Balls Kit (Empire Labs)
- 2017: Buck-OFF - Buck Angel FTM Stroker (Perfect Fit Brand)
- 2018: Warm, (Warm)
- 2019: Touch, Warm

=== Star Branded ===
- 2012: Fleshlight Girls/Lisa Ann (Fleshlight)
- 2013: James Deen Signature Collection (Doc Johnson)

=== Toy Manufacturer of the Year ===
- 2010: Pipedream Products
- 2011: California Exotic Novelties

== Retail and Distribution/Wholesale ==
=== Home Party Company of the Year ===
- 2018: Bedroom Kandi
- 2019: Pure Romance

=== Retailer of the Year ===
- 2009: Castle Megastores
- 2010: Hustler Hollywood
- 2011: Castle Megastores

=== Retailer of the Year – Boutique ===
- 2011: Good Vibrations
- 2012: The Pleasure Chest
- 2013: Good Vibrations
- 2014: Coco de Mer
- 2015: Good Vibrations
- 2016: Good Vibrations
- 2017: The Pleasure Chest
- 2018: Feelmore Adult Gallery
- 2019: The Pleasure Chest

=== Retailer of the Year – Chain ===
- 2012: Adam & Eve
- 20:13 Peekay
- 2014: Castle Megastore
- 2015: Adam & Eve
- 2016: Lion's Den
- 2017: Hustler Hollywood
- 2018: Good Vibrations
- 2019: Adam & Eve Stores

=== Retailer of the Year – Progressive ===
- 2018: Hustler Hollywood
- 2019: Hustler Hollywood

=== Online Retailer of the Year ===
- 2022: PinkCherry
- 2024: PinkCherry

=== Online Retailer of the Year – Full Range ===
- 2013: Adam & Eve
- 2014: Adam & Eve
- 2015: Adam & Eve
- 2016: Adam & Eve
- 2017: AdamEve.com
- 2018: AdamEve.com
- 2019: AdamEve.com

=== Online Retailer of the Year – Pleasure Products ===
- 2013: Eden Fantasys
- 2014: Fleshlight.com
- 2015: LoveHoney.com
- 2016: LoveHoney.com
- 2017: LoveHoney.com
- 2018: Lovehoney.com
- 2019: Lovehoney.com

=== Online Retailer of the Year – Specialty ===
- 2018: Stockroom.com
- 2019: UnboundBabes.com

=== Retail Education/Training Program of the Year ===
- 2018: The CalExotics Institute, CalExotics
- 2019: Williams Trading University

=== Wholesaler/Distributor of the Year – Full Range ===
- 2011: IVD/East Coast News
- 2012: Eldorado
- 2013: International Video Distributors/East Coast News
- 2014: International Video Distributors/East Coast News
- 2015: IVD/East Coast News

=== Wholesaler/Distributor of the Year – International ===
- 2013: Pink Cherry Wholesale
- 2014: Eropartner Distribution
- 2015: Scala Playhouse
- 2016: Eropartner Distribution
- 2017: Shots Media
- 2018: Eropartner Distribution
- 2019: Shots Media

=== Wholesaler/Distributor of the Year – Pleasure Products ===
- 2013: Entrenue
- 2014: Eldorado
- 2015: Eldorado Trading Company
- 2016: Eldorado Trading Company
- 2017: Eldorado Co.
- 2018: Eldorado Trading Co.
- 2019: Eldorado Trading Company

=== Wholesaler/Distributor of the Year – Progressive ===
- 2018: Williams Trading Co.
- 2019: Nalpac

=== Wholesaler/Distributor of the Year – Specialty ===
- 2011: Stockroom
- 2012: Paradise Marketing
- 2013: Paradise Marketing
- 2014: Entrenue
- 2015: XGEN Products
- 2016: XGEN Products
- 2017: Entrenue
- 2018: Xgen Products
- 2018: Xgen Products

== Screenplay of the Year ==
- 2011: Nic Andrews, Rawhide 2: Dirty Deeds, (Adam & Eve Pictures)
- 2012: Graham Travis, Portrait of a Call Girl (Elegant Angel)
- 2013: Jacky St. James, Torn (New Sensations)
- 2014: Jacky St. James, The Temptation of Eve (New Sensations)
- 2015: Mark Logan, Wetwork (Vivid Entertainment)
- 2016: Jacky St. James, The Submission of Emma Marx 2: Boundaries (New Sensations)
- 2017: Brad Armstrong, The Preacher's Daughter (Wicked Pictures)
- 2018: The Submission of Emma Marx: Evolved (New Sensations)
- 2019: Abigail (Tushy)

== Sexpert of the Year ==
- 2016: Dr. Jess
- 2017: Jessica Drake
- 2018: Dr. Chris Donaghue
- 2019: Dr. Emily Morse
- 2020: Ashley Manta
- 2021: Sunny Megatron
- 2022: Amy Baldwin
- 2023: Dirty Lola
- 2024: Amy Baldwin & April Lampert
- 2025: Kasha Johnson
- 2026: Alicia Sinclair

== Sexual Health, Wellness and Enhancement ==
=== Sex Enhancement Product of the Year ===
- 2017: Crazy Girl Oral Sex Gel (Classic Erotica)

=== Sexual Health and Wellness Brand of the Year ===
- 2017: JO

=== Sexual Health and Wellness Product of the Year ===
- 2017: Lovelife krush (OhMiBod)

== Special Honorees ==
=== Advocate of the Year ===
- 2006: Greg Piccionelli

=== ASACP Service Recognition Award ===
The ASACP in the title refers to Association of Sites Advocating Child Protection:

- 2007: Greg Piccionelli
- 2009: Stormy Daniels, Tera Patrick and Evan Seinfeld
- 2010: Joel Hall (Epoch)
- 2011: Scott Rabinowitz (CyberStampede) and John Van Arnham
- 2012: Rodney Thompson (Cyber Stampede)
- 2013: Marc Randazza (Randazza Legal Group)

=== Businessman of the Year ===
- 2006: Joe Lensman (Adult.com)
- 2007: Kevin Ho (TopBucks/Pink Visual)
- 2009: Ben Jelloun (Metro)
- 2010: Ilan Bunimovitz (Private Media Group/GameLink)
- 2020: Scotty Gelt (La Viva Bella/Scottsdale Models)

([13][25]

=== Businesswoman of the Year ===
- 2006: Jenna Jameson
- 2007: Samantha Lewis (Digital Playground)
- 2010: Allison Vivas (Pink Visual/TopBucks)

=== Eros Progressive Business ===
- 2011: Angelo Abela (Sexyland)
- 2012: Windsor Wholesale Australia & Swiss Navy
- 2013: Rob Godwin (Sexpo International, Australia)

=== FSC Award ===
- 2010: Girlfriends Films

=== FSC Leadership ===
- 2009: Kink.com
- 2011: Colin Rountree (Wasteland.com)
- 2012: Allison Vivas (Pink Visual)
- 2013: Amnon (Met-Art.com)

=== Honorary Legal ===
- 2007: Jeffrey J. Douglas

=== Industry Achievement ===
- 2004: Larry Flynt

=== Industry Humanitarian Award ===
- 2010: Steve Bryson (OrbitalPay)

=== Industry Icon ===
- 2012: Larry Flynt (Hustler)

=== Industry Innovator ===
- 2012: Steve Shubin (Fleshlight)

=== Industry Leadership Award ===
- 2017: Eric Paul Leue (Free Speech Coalition)

=== Industry Pioneer ===
- 2009: Ron Levi (CE Cash)

=== Industry Pioneer Award – Movies and Production ===
- 2016: Ken Guarino, Metro
- 2017: Kelly Holland (Penthouse)
- 2018: Ted Blitt, Mile High Media

=== Industry Pioneer Award – Novelty/Pleasure Products ===
- 2012: Ron Braverman (Doc Johnson)
- 2014: Nick Orlandino (Pipedream Products)
- 2016: Martin Tucker (Topco Sales)
- 2017: Shay and Dan Martin (Vibratex)
- 2018: Dennis Paradise, Paradise Marketing

=== Industry Pioneer Award – Retail and Distribution ===
- 2012: Mark Franks (Castle Megastore)
- 2014: Morton Hyatt (Komar Company)
- 2016: Ralph Caplan (Nalpac)
- 2017: Larry Garland (Eldorado)
- 2018: Robert Pyne Sr., Williams Trading Co.

=== Industry Pioneer Award – Video ===
- 2010: John Stagliano (Evil Angel)
- 2011: Patrick Collins (Elegant Angel)

=== Industry Pioneer Award – Web and Technology ===
- 2010: Greg Clayman and Chuck Tsiamis (VideoSecrets)
- 2012: Kim Nielsen (ATKingdom)
- 2014: György Gattyán (Adult Webmaster Empire)
- 2016: Ilan Bunimovitz (GameLink.com)
- 2017: Ron Cadwell (CCBill)
- 2018: Karl Bernard, Gamma Entertainment

=== Industry Service Award ===
- 2016: Tim Henning (ASACP)

=== Lifetime Achievement ===
- 2004: Larry Flynt
- 2011: Michael Moran (Lion's Den)

=== Man of the Year ===
- 2008: Marc Bell (Penthouse)
- 2011: John Stagliano (Evil Angel)
- 2012: Dan O'Connell (Girlfriends Films)

=== Outstanding Achievement ===
- 2008: IMLive
- 2008: PussyCash

=== Special Memorial ===
- 2009: Frank Cadwell, Joann Cadwell

== Specialty Release of the Year ==
- 2012: Jessica Drake's Guide to Wicked Sex: Anal Edition (Wicked Pictures)
- 2013: Adam & Eve's Guide to the Kama Sutra (Adam & Eve Pictures)
- 2014: Kama Sutra (Marc Dorcel)
- 2015: Jessica Drake's Guide to Wicked Sex: Plus Size (Wicked Pictures)
- 2016: Amazing Sex Secrets: Better Orgasms (Adam & Eve Pictures)
- 2017: Nina Hartley's Guide to Exploring Open Relationships (Adam & Eve Pictures)

== Studio of the Year ==
- 2006: Digital Playground
- 2007: Digital Playground
- 2008: Evil Angel
- 2009: Digital Playground
- 2010: Jules Jordan Video
- 2011: Digital Playground
- 2012: Elegant Angel
- 2013: New Sensations
- 2014: Evil Angel
- 2015: Hard X
- 2016: Evil Angel
- 2017: Evil Angel
- 2018: Vixen/Tushy/Blacked
- 2019: Gamma Films
- 2020: Gamma Entertainment

=== European/Foreign Studio ===
- 2011: Marc Dorcel
- 2012: Marc Dorcel
- 2013: Marc Dorcel
- 2014: Marc Dorcel
- 2015: Marc Dorcel
- 2016: Marc Dorcel
- 2017: Marc Dorcel
- 2018: Harmony Films
- 2019: Marc Dorcel
- 2020: Marc Dorcel

=== Feature Studio ===
- 2011: Wicked Pictures

=== Fetish Studio ===
- 2012: Kink.com

=== Gonzo Studio ===
- 2011: Elegant Angel
- 2012: Jules Jordan Video

=== New Studio ===
- 2010: Sweet Sinner
- 2013: Hard Candy Films
- 2015: Airerose Entertainment
- 2016: ArchAngel
- 2017: Vixen.com
- 2018: PureTaboo.com
- 2020: Deeper

=== Parody Studio ===
- 2011: New Sensations
- 2012: Hustler Video

== Taboo ==
=== Taboo Release of the Year ===
- 2018: The Stepmother 15 (Sweet Sinner/Mile High)
- 2019: Future Darkly: Artifamily (Pure Taboo/Gamma Films)
- 2020: The Gold Star: A Whitney Wright Story, (Pure Taboo)

== Vignette ==
=== Vignette Release of the Year ===
- 2012: Office Perverts 6 (Reality Junkies/Mile High Media)
- 2013: Allie Haze: True Sex (Vivid Entertainment)
- 2014: Busty Beauties Car Wash (Hustler Video)
- 2015: Entrapments (Forbidden Fruits Films/Exile)
- 2016: A Hotwife Blindfolded 2 (New Sensations)
- 2017: The Proposal (New Sensations)
- 2018: Sun-Lit (TrenchcoatX.com/Jules Jordan Video)
- 2019: After Dark (Vixen)
- 2020: Sordid Stories (Deeper)

=== Vignette Series of the Year ===
- 2012: Bus Stop Girls (Smash Pictures)
- 2013: Tonight's Girlfriend (Naughty America/Pure Play)
- 2014: Tonight's Girlfriend (Naughty America/Pure Play)
- 2015: Tonight's Girlfriend (Naughty America/Pure Play)
- 2016: Tonight's Girlfriend (Naughty America/Pure Play)
- 2017: Barely Legal (Hustler Video)
- 2018: First Anal (Tushy.com/Jules Jordan Video)
- 2019: Blacked Raw V (Blacked)
- 2020: Blacked Raw (Blacked)

== Web and Tech ==
=== CPA Network of the Year ===
- 2018: CrakRevenue

=== Dating Company of the Year ===
- 2018: Adult FriendFinder
- 2019: Adult FriendFinder

=== Emerging Web Brand of the Year ===
- 2018: FuckingAwesome.com
- 2019: Nutaku

=== Innovative Web/Tech Company of the Year ===
- 2010: RedLightCenter.com

=== Innovative Web/Tech Product of the Year ===
- 2011: AdultCentro
- 2012: PVLocker.com (Pink Visual)
- 2013: WebcamWiz
- 2014: MyFreeSexStore
- 2015: ModelCentro
- 2016: CamBuilder (Streamate)
- 2017: MyPorn.com
- 2018: FanCentro
- 2019: PumaPay

=== Marketing Campaign of the Year (Web) ===
- 2018: Traffic Pimps
- 2019: ManyVids

=== Mobile Company of the Year ===
- 2018: BitterStrawberry

=== Payment Services Company of the Year – IPSP ===
- 2018: Epoch
- 2019: SegPay

=== Payment Services Company of the Year – Merchant Services ===
- 2018: NETBilling
- 2019: MobiusPay

=== Payment Services Company of the Year – Alternative ===
- 2018: Paxum
- 2019: Paxum

=== Progressive Web Company/Brand of the Year ===
- 2018: iWantEmpire
- 2019: JuicyAds

=== Software Company of the Year ===
- 2008: Mansion Productions LLC
- 2009: Too Much Media
- 2010: 2Much.net
- 2011: Too Much Media
- 2012: Elevated X
- 2013: Mansion Productions
- 2014: ElevatedX
- 2015: ElevatedX

=== Traffic Company of the Year – North America ===
- 2018: TrafficJunky
- 2019: ExoClick

=== Traffic Company of the Year – Europe ===
- 2018: TrafficStars

=== VOD Company of the Year ===
- 2018: AEBN
- 2019: Erotik.com

=== Web Host of the Year ===
- 2003: Mach10 Hosting
- 2004: Webair
- 2005: Split Infinity
- 2006: Split Infinity
- 2007: National Net
- 2008: Webair
- 2009: MojoHost
- 2010: Cavecreek
- 2011: MojoHost
- 2012: MojoHost
- 2013: MojoHost
- 2014: MojoHost
- 2015: MojoHost
- 2016: MojoHost
- 2017: MojoHost
- 2018: MojoHost
- 2019: MojoHost

=== Web Solutions Company of the Year ===
- 2018: ModelCentro " />
- 2019: ModelCentro

== Web Performances/Shows ==
=== Cam Company of the Year – North America ===
- 2018: Chaturbate
- 2019: BongaCams

=== Cam Company of the Year – Europe ===
- 2018: ImLive

=== Cam Model of the Year – Female (Studio & Independent) ===
- 2018: Jenny Blighe
- 2019: (Studio) Kendra Summer
- 2019: (Independent) Emily Bloom
- 2020: (Independent) Bunny Marthy

=== Cam Model of the Year – Male ===
- 2018: Ethan Joy
- 2019: Brock Cooper

=== Cam Site of the Year – North America ===
- 2018: MyFreeCams.com
- 2019: MyFreeCams.com

=== Cam Site of the Year – Europe ===
- 2018: Jasmin.com

=== Cam Site of the Year – Gay ===
- 2018: Flirt4Free.com
- 2019: Chaturbate.com

=== Cam Studio of the Year – Europe ===
- Studio 20
- Studio 20

=== Cam Studio of the Year – Latin America ===
- 2018: AJ Studios

=== Clip Artist of the Year - Female ===
- 2019: Reya Sunshine

=== Clip Artist of the Year - Male ===
- 2019: Wesley Woods

=== Clip Site of the Year ===
- 2019: ManyVids.com

=== Web Babe/Web Star of the Year ===
- 2008: Sunny Leone
- 2009: Trisha Uptown
- 2010: Jelena Jensen
- 2011: Gisele
- 2012: Vicky Vette
- 2013: Vicky Vette
- 2014: Evelyn Cates
- 2015: Ariel Rebel
- 2016: Kendra Sunderland
- 2017: Harriet Sugarcookie
- 2018: Catjira
- 2019: Natasha Nice

=== Web Show of the Year ===
- 2005: RainMaker

== Websites ==
=== Adult Site of the Year – Paysite – Multi-Genre ===
- 2007: TheBestPorn.com
- 2012: VideoBox.com
- 2013: BangBros.com
- 2014: 21Sextury.com
- 2015: Brazzers.com
- 2018: PornDoePremium.com
- 2019: Brazzers.com

=== Adult Site of the Year – BDSM ===
- 2014: DivineBitches.com
- 2015: Kink.com
- 2016: Kink.com
- 2017: Kink.com
- 2018: Kink.com
- 2019: Kink.com

=== Adult Site of the Year – Clips ===
- 2018: ManyVids.com

=== Adult Site of the Year – Erotic ===
- 2015: X-Art.com
- 2016: SexArt.com
- 2017: NubileFilms.com
- 2018: X-Art.com
- 2019: Babes.com

=== Adult Site of the Year – Fan Site ===
- 2015: FreeOnes.com
- 2016: WoodRocket.com
- 2017: IAFD.com
- 2018: IAFD.com
- 2019: FreeOnes.com

=== Adult Site of the Year – Female Produced ===
- 2019: XConfessions.com

=== Adult Site of the Year – Fetish ===
- 2014: Clips4Sale.com

=== Adult Site of the Year – For Women ===
- 2016: XConfessions.com
- 2017: Sssh.com

=== Adult Site of the Year – Gay ===
- 2011: CorbinFisher.com
- 2012: HotHouse.com
- 2013: BelAmiOnline.com
- 2014: BelAmiOnline.com
- 2015: CockyBoys.com
- 2016: BelAmiOnline.com
- 2017: CockyBoys.com
- 2018: CockyBoys.com
- 2019: CockyBoys.com
- 2020: BelAmiOnline.com
- 2021: FalconStudios.com
- 2022: Men.com
- 2023: NextDoorStudios.com
- 2024: ASGMax.com
- 2025: NakedSword.com

=== Adult Site of the Year – MILF ===
- 2011: Kelly Madison

=== Adult Site of the Year – Niche ===
- 2015: Blacked.com
- 2016: Blacked.com
- 2017: Tushy.com

=== Adult Site of the Year – Photography ===
- 2013: Twistys.com
- 2014: HollyRandall.com
- 2015: MetArt.com
- 2016: HollyRandall.com
- 2017: MetArt.com
- 2018: MetArt.com
- 2019: MetArt.com

=== Adult Site of the Year – Performer ===
- 2010: EvaAngelinaXXXX.com
- 2011: ToriBlack.com
- 2012: SunnyLeone.com
- 2013: AlexisTexas.com
- 2014: VickyAtHome.com
- 2015: AngelaWhite.com
- 2016: AngelaWhite.com
- 2017: JamesDeen.com
- 2018: ReidMyLips.com
- 2019: SinsLife.com (Johnny & Kissa Sins)

=== Adult Site of the Year – Retail ===
- 2006: Sextoy.com
- 2007: WantedList
- 2008: Adam & Eve
- 2009: Stockroom.com
- 2010: Fleshlight
- 2011: SexToy.com
- 2012: Adam & Eve

=== Adult Site of the Year – Solo/All-Girl ===
- 2011: Met-Art.com
- 2012: AbbyWinters.com
- 2018: Girlsway.com
- 2019: Girlsway.com

=== Adult Site of the Year – Specialty/Alternative ===
- 2013: Kink.com
- 2014: (tie) Kink.com and CrashPadSeries.com
- 2015: Sssh.com
- 2016: CrashPadSeries.com
- 2017: CrashPadSeries.com
- 2018: TrenchcoatX.com

=== Adult Site of the Year – Studio ===
- 2011: EvilAngel.com
- 2012: NaughtyAmerica.com
- 2013: NaughtyAmerica.com
- 2014: Brazzers.com
- 2015: EvilAngel.com
- 2016: EvilAngel.com
- 2017: EvilAngel.com
- 2018: EvilAngel.com
- 2019: EvilAngel.com

=== Adult Site of the Year – Trans ===
- 2012: WendyWilliamsXXX.com
- 2013: TrannyBox.com
- 2014: EvaLinXXX.com
- 2015: Shemale.xxx
- 2016: Trans500.com
- 2017: ShemaleYum.com
- 2018: GroobyGirls.com
- 2019: GroobyGirls.com

=== Adult Site of the Year – Video/VOD ===
- 2016: Brazzers.com
- 2017: Vixen.com
- 2018: AdultEmpire.com
- 2019: AdultEmpire.com

=== Adult Site of the Year – Virtual Reality ===
- 2016: BadoinkVR.com
- 2017: NaughtyAmerica.com
- 2018: WankzVR.com
- 2019: WankzVR.com

== Woman of the Year ==
- 2008: Diane Duke (Free Speech Coalition)
- 2009: Lori Z (The Adult Broker)
- 2011: Allison Vivas (Pink Visual)
- 2012: Diane Duke (Free Speech Coalition)

== Performer Director Site of the Year ==
- 2021: Littlecaprice-dreams.com Owner Little Caprice & Marcello Bravo
- 2022: Littlecaprice-dreams.com Owner Little Caprice & Marcello Bravo
