= Best New Starlet =

Best New Starlet may refer to:

- AVN Award for Best New Starlet
- XBIZ Award for Best New Starlet
