= Garion (disambiguation) =

Garion is a fictional character.

Garion may also refer to:

- Garion (artist)
- Garion Hall
