= Nica Noelle =

American pornographer

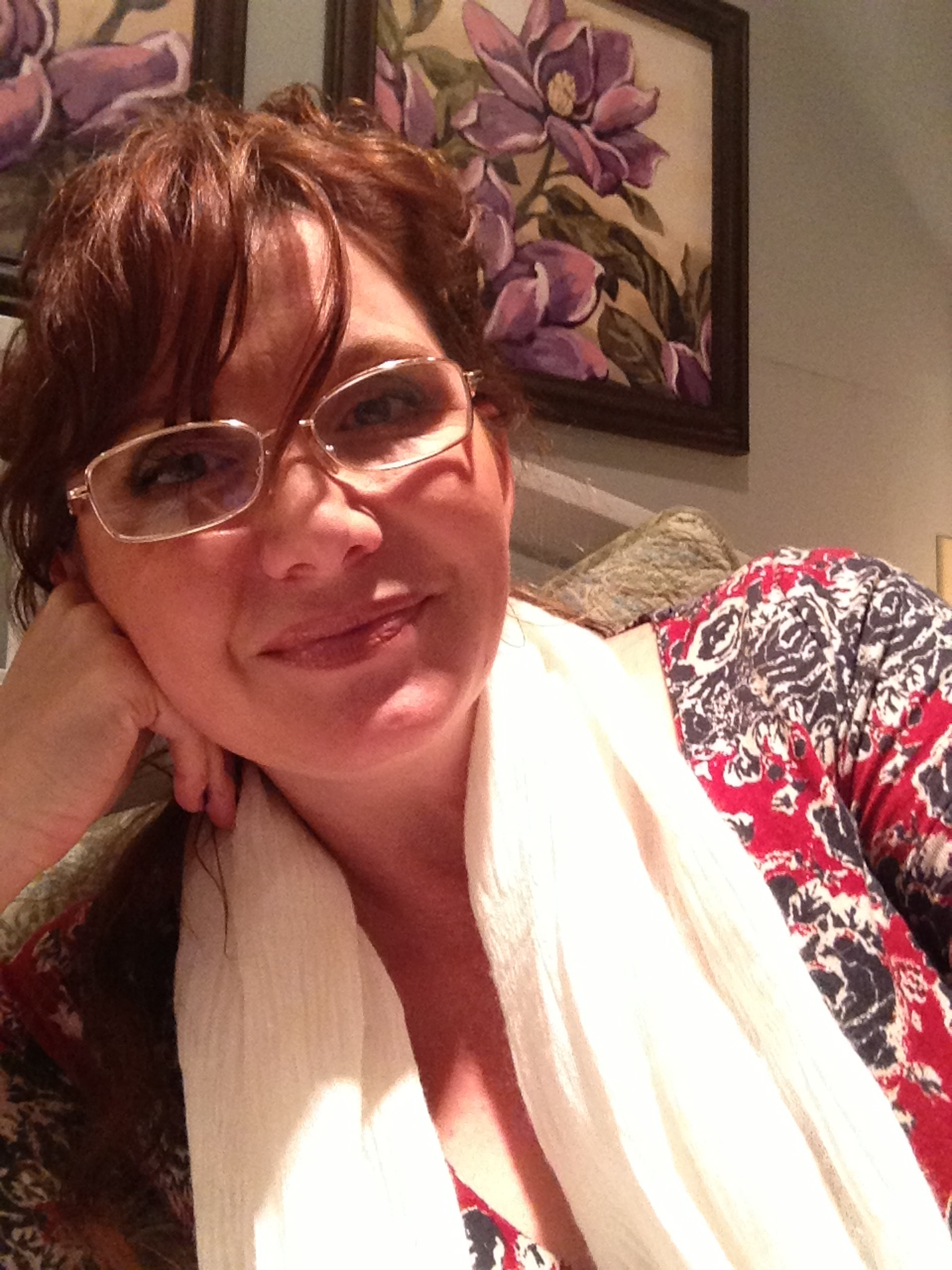
- Noelle in 2012
- Born: Manhattan, New York, U.S.
- Other name: Sydni Ellis
- Occupations: Entrepreneur; pornographic film actress; director; writer

Nica Noelle is an American entrepreneur, pornographic film actress and director, as well as a writer whose essays have appeared in Salon.com, HuffPost, and Hustler. She is the co-founder of adult film studios Sweetheart Video, Sweet Sinner, Sweet Sinema, Girl Candy Films, Rock Candy films, Hot Candy Films, and TransRomantic Films.

== Career ==
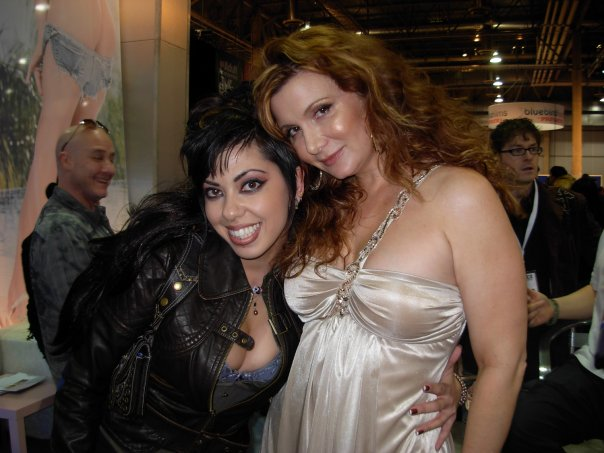
Noelle (right) with fellow performer Satine Phoenix in 2011

=== As performer ===
Noelle began her career at the age of 19, working at a psychodrama house in New York City. Afterwards, she became a columnist for underground adult magazines, but she soon switched to porn after she began writing for magazines like $pread.

=== As director ===
After writing, directing, and performing in some scenes for the lesbian-porn studio Girlfriends Films, Noelle and Mile High Media (an adult film production/distribution company) founded rival lesbian-porn company Sweetheart Video, straight couples-themed brand Sweet Sinner, and Hollywood-inspired brand Sweet Sinema. Through November 2011, Noelle was the sole writer and director of every title from each of these companies. Each of the studios' productions are distributed through Mile High Media. Noelle received an AVN Award nomination for Director of the Year in 2010.

In 2011, Noelle began directing for Mile High Media's then-new company, Sweet Sinema. However, she resigned from Mile High Media that November to sign a new deal with AEBN to create new porn brands Girl Candy Films (lesbian sex), Hard Candy Films (straight), Rock Candy Films (gay), and TransRomantic Films (transgender). Hard Candy Films has since been renamed Hot Candy Films.

Noelle has also written about her career on her HuffPost blog and on Salon.com.

== Personal life ==
Noelle is Irish and Welsh on her mother's side and Danish and German on her father's side.

Noelle has a son.

== Awards and nominations ==
Year	Ceremony	Category	Work	Result
2010	AVN Award	Director of the Year (Body of Work)	—N/a	Nominated
2013	AVN Award	Best Director - Feature	A Mother's Love	Nominated
2013	AVN Award	Best Screenplay	A Mother's Love	Nominated
2013	AVN	Game Changer	—N/a	Won
2013	XBIZ Award	Director of the Year - Body of Work	—N/a	Nominated
2013	XBIZ Award	Director of the Year - Parody	Pretty Lady	Nominated
2013	XRCO Award	Best Director (Features)	—N/a	Nominated
2014	XBIZ Award	Director of the Year - Body of Work	—N/a	Nominated
2014	XBIZ Award	Director of the Year - Feature Release	Nobody's Daughter	Nominated
2014	XBIZ Award	Gay Director of the Year	—N/a	Nominated
2017	XBIZ Award	Trans Director of the Year	—N/a	Won
