= Baci Lingerie =

American women's lingerie retailer

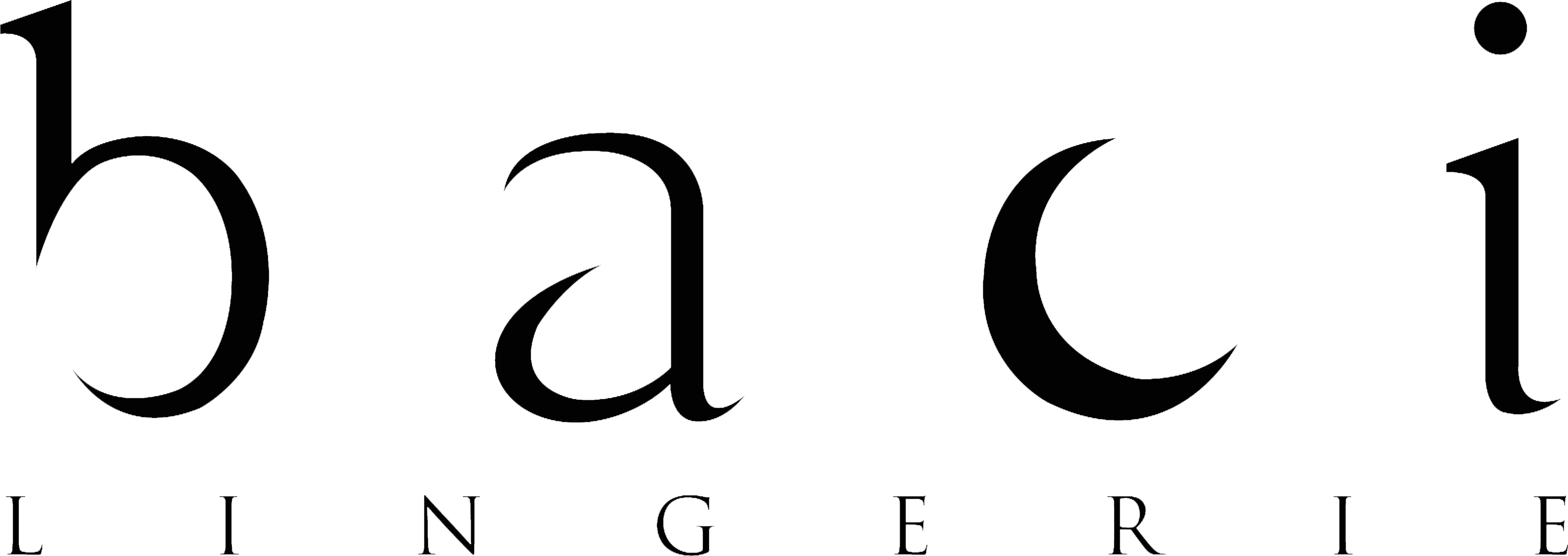
- Logo of Baci Lingerie
- Industry: Apparel
- Founded: 2010
- Number of locations: Van Nuys, CA
- Area served: Worldwide
- Key people: Frank Koretsky (Baci Lingerie President & CEO); Helle Panzieri (Baci Lingerie Sales Director)
- Products: Underwear, women’s clothing, lingerie, eyelashes, masks, hosiery, pantyhose, thongs, baby doll sets, crotchless panties, bikini sets, body stockings, g-strings, boy shorts, bras, garters, halters, skirtinis, v-teddies, pasties
- Website: baci.com

Baci Lingerie is a large retailer of women's lingerie founded in the United States, with multiple stores located internationally on several continents.

== History ==
Officially presented to the public in April 2010 at the International Lingerie Show in Las Vegas, Nevada, the company was started by Internetmarketing-Miami, LLC. Deriving its company name from the Italian word “kisses”, the company invested huge amount of money in advertising and marketing campaigns and exhibiting at several industry shows around the world, like Venus Fair in Berlin, Germany during October 2010 and Salon de la Lingerie Show in Paris, France, in January 2011.

== Products and marketing ==
The shoots have featured castles in Southern Germany, the United Kingdom, and France. The resulting images are used in Baci's packaging, website, and catalogs.

Baci Lingerie coordinated a photo shoot in 2013, which took place in a Hollywood Hills mansion and featured its 23-piece Corsets by Baci Collection.

Baci Lingerie provides tools for retailers in merchandising and marketing, including planograms, creative events (including the Baci Lash Bar), educational tools (newsletters, merchandising plans, seminars, blogs), and contests.

== Philanthropy ==
Baci Lingerie claims to have philosophy of social consciousness and philanthropy as its integral aspects. Through contributions and fundraisers, including Baci's annual charity dinner, the company raises money for a variety of organizations and causes.

=== Eileen Stein Jacoby Fund ===
Baci Lingerie raised over $8,000 for the Fox Chase Cancer Center and Eileen Stein Jacoby Fund to advance cancer research and education, at Baci's second semiannual charity dinner in April 2013. The charity dinner was held during the International Lingerie Show. Baci raised $4,400 for the fund in 2012.

=== Bra Recyclers ===
Baci Lingerie supported The Bra Recyclers in its drive to collect 15,000 bras in October 2012 to help raise awareness of Breast Cancer and Domestic Violence Month. The Bra Recyclers is a textile recycling company that specializes in recycling and reusing bras that would unnecessarily go to landfills, and assist in providing deserving women with used or unused bras as they transition back to self-sufficiency.

=== Revlon Run / Walk ===
Baci Lingerie participated in the 2013 Entertainment Industry Fund (EIF) Revlon Run / Walk For Women, to raise funds for women's cancer research. Approximately 15 Baci employees, family members, and friends participated in the 20th annual 5k run / walk fundraiser as “Team Baci Babes” on May 11, 2013, at the Los Angeles Memorial Coliseum at Exposition Park.

=== XO Oklahoma ===
Baci Lingerie donated 1176 brand new bras of various styles to victims of the 2013 tornadoes in Moore, Oklahoma – a total retail value of over $15,000. Hugs and Kisses, or XO, is a project by the Kerr Foundation, formed to gather and distribute new and gently used clothing and accessory items for women and men affected by the Moore tornado disaster.

=== Free The Girls ===
Baci Lingerie donated 5077 brand new bras of various styles – a total retail value of over $60,000. Free The Girls provides an opportunity for women rescued from sex trafficking to earn a living selling second-hand clothing, while going to school, getting healthy, and caring for their families.

== Sponsorships ==
- 2010 Adult Entertainment Expo
- 2010 Venus International Trade Fair
- 2011 Venus International Trade Fair
- 2012 Porn to Rock
- 2012 Capital Cabaret Fashion Show
- 2012 Venus International Trade Fair
- 2012 Déjà Vu Holiday Soiree
- 2013 Cape Town SEXPO
- 2013 Sydney SEXPO.
- 2013 The Sex Awards

== Awards ==
Year	Nominee / work	Award	Result
2010	Outstanding Apparel or Accessory Brand	AVN Awards	Nominated
2010	Outstanding Marketing Campaign	AVN Awards	Nominated
2010	Outstanding Packaging	AVN Awards	Nominated
2011	Best Lingerie or Apparel Company	AVN Awards	Won
2011	Lingerie Manufacturer of the Year	XBIZ Awards	Won
2011	Outstanding Apparel / Accessory Brand (Black Label)	AVN Awards	Nominated
2011	Outstanding Marketing Campaign (Black Label)	AVN Awards	Nominated
2011	Best Erotic Clothing Brand	ETO Awards	Won
2011	Lingerie Manufacturer of the Year	StorErotica Awards	Won
2011	Marketing Campaign of the Year	XBIZ Awards	Won
2012	Lingerie Manufacturer of the Year	StorErotica Awards	Nominated
2012	Costume Manufacturer of the Year	StorErotica Awards	Nominated
2012	Best Lingerie or Apparel Company	AVN Awards	Won
2012	Best Sex Accessory (Eyelashes)	AVN Awards	Won
2012	Lingerie / Apparel Company of the Year	XBIZ Awards	Won
2012	Sensual Accessory Product of the Year (Eyelashes)	XBIZ Awards	Won
2012	Best Lingerie Brand	ETO Awards	Nominated
2012	Outstanding Lingerie Collection (White Label)	AVN Awards	Nominated
2012	Outstanding Packaging (Dreams Collection)	AVN Awards	Nominated
2013	Best Lingerie or Apparel Company	AVN Awards	Won
2013	Lingerie Manufacturer of the Year	StorErotica Awards	Won
2013	Costume Manufacturer of the Year	StorErotica Awards	Nominated
2014	Lingerie / Apparel Company of the Year	XBIZ Awards	Nominated
2014	Lingerie Collection of the Year (Dreams 2)	XBIZ Awards	Nominated
2014	Sensual Accessory Product of the Year (Luna Veneziana Masquerade Collection)	XBIZ Awards	Nominated
2014	Sensual Accessory Product of the Year (Eyelashes)	XBIZ Awards	Nominated
2014	Marketing Campaign of the Year	XBIZ Awards	Nominated
2014	Luxury Toy / Line of the Year (Shiri Zinn for Baci)	XBIZ Awards	Nominated
2014	Outstanding Packaged Lingerie Line	AVN Awards	Nominated
2014	Outstanding Costume Lingerie Collection (Dreams 2)	AVN Awards	Nominated
2014	Outstanding Accessory Product Year (Luna Veneziana Masquerade Collection)	AVN Awards	Nominated
2014	Outstanding Packaged Lingerie Line (Envy)	AVN Awards	Nominated
2014	Best Product Line for Women (Luna Veneziana Masquerade Collection)	AVN Awards	Nominated
2014	Best Lingerie / Apparel Manufacturer	AVN Awards	Nominated
2014	Best Lingerie / Apparel Manufacturer (Envy)	AVN Awards	Nominated
2015	Lingerie Collection of the Year (After Dark)	XBIZ Awards	Won
