= Sweetheart Video =

Canadian pornographic film studio based in Montreal, Quebec

- Industry: Pornographic films
- Founded: 2008
- Founder: Jonathan Blitt; Nica Noelle
- Headquarters: Montreal, Quebec, Canada
- Owner: Mile High Media
- Parent: Mile High Media
- Website: sweetheartvideo.com

Sweetheart Video is a Canadian pornographic film studio based in Montreal, Quebec. The studio was founded by Jonathan Blitt and pornographic actress Nica Noelle in 2008, and it specializes in lesbian-themed films. Noelle initially wrote and directed all the films, but she left the studio in 2011. Subsequent films were initially written and directed by other people in the adult industry, including Melissa Monet, Dana Vespoli, and James Avalon; Vespoli now exclusively writes and directs all the films.

== Main series ==
The studio has made many series of films, and this list includes the ones with the most sequels released:

- Lesbian Adventures
- Girls Kissing Girls
- Lesbian Babysitters
- Lesbian Beauties
- Mother Lovers Society
- Lesbian Office Seductions
- Lesbian Truth or Dare

== Awards and nominations ==
List of awards won by Sweetheart Video
Awards and Nominations
Sweetheart Video
Ceremony	Won	Nominated
AEBN	3	3
AVN	0	18
FPA	0	4
XBIZ	0	12
XRCO	0	1
Other	0	4
Total number of wins and nominations for Sweetheart Video
Totals	3	42
- Footnotes

Sweetheart Video's films have won and have been nominated for several awards, including AVN, XBIZ and XRCO Awards.

=== AVN Awards ===
Year	Category	Work	Result
2010	Best All-Girl Release	Girls Kissing Girls 3	Nominated
2010	Best All-Girl Series	Lesbian Adventures	Nominated
2011	Best All-Girl Series	Girls Kissing Girls	Nominated
2011	Best All-Girl Series	Lesbian Adventures	Nominated
2011	Best Educational Release	Nina Loves Girls 2	Nominated
2011	Best MILF Series	Mother Lovers Society	Nominated
2011	Best Older Woman/Younger Girl Release	Legends and Starlets 2	Nominated
2012	Best All-Girl Series	Girls Kissing Girls	Nominated
2013	Best All-Girl Series	Lesbian Adventures	Nominated
2013	Best All-Girl Series	Lesbian Babysitters	Nominated
2013	Best Ethnic Release – Black	Lesbian Beauties 7: All Black Beauties	Nominated
2014	Best All-Girl Release	Shades of Pink	Nominated
2014	Best All-Girl Series	Girls Kissing Girls	Nominated
2014	Best All-Girl Series	Lesbian Adventures	Nominated
2014	Best Ethnic Release - Asian	Lesbian Beauties 9: Asian Beauties	Nominated
2014	Best Ethnic Release - Latin	Lesbian Beauties 10: Latinas	Nominated
2014	Best Older Woman/Younger Girl Release	Lesbian Adventures: Older Women, Younger Girls 3	Nominated
2014	Best Older Woman/Younger Girl Release	Lesbian Hitchhiker 5	Nominated
2015	Best All-Girl Release	Lesbian Beauties 11: All Black Beauties	Nominated
2015	Best All-Girl Release	Lexi Belle Loves Girls	Nominated
2015	Best All-Girl Series	Girls Kissing Girls	Won
2015	Best All-Girl Series	Lesbian Beauties	Nominated
2015	Best Older Woman/Younger Girl Release	Lesbian Adventures: Older Women, Younger Girls 5	Nominated

=== Feminist Porn Awards ===
Year	Category	Work	Result
2010	—N/a	Lesbian Adventures: Victorian Love Letters	Nominated
2010	—N/a	Lesbian Hitchhiker	Nominated
2011	—N/a	Lesbian Deception	Nominated
2011	—N/a	Lesbian Truth or Dare 4	Nominated
