= Smash Pictures =

American pornographic film studio

- Company type: Private
- Industry: Pornography
- Founded: 2001
- Headquarters: Chatsworth, California, United States
- Products: Pornographic films
- Owner: Dan Quinn
- Website: www.smashpictures.com

Smash Pictures is an American independent pornographic film production company located in Chatsworth, California.

== Company history ==
Founded in 2001, the studio specializes in producing gonzo pornography in the fantasy and fetish play genres, creating series such as Naughty Nanny, Whale Tail, Killer Grip, and the AVN Award winning Cheating Housewives. The studio is managed by Vice-President Wyatt Case, and owned by East Coast retailer Dan Quinn.

== Awards and industry recognition ==
- 2012 XBIZ Award - 'Vignette Series of the Year' for Bus Stop Girls
- 2014 XBIZ Award - 'All-Sex Release of the Year' for Whale Tail 6

== Lawsuit ==
In 2012 Smash Pictures was sued by Universal Studios over the film Fifty Shades of Grey: A XXX Adaptation. Universal claimed that the film was not made as a parody, but rather a direct interpretation of the Fifty Shades of Grey book and Fifty Shades Darker. Smash Pictures had previously stated that they intended to make the pornographic movie faithful to the books. In the lawsuit, Universal requested that they receive an injunction as well as the film's profits and damages.
