= Doc Johnson =

American sex toy company

Doc Johnson Enterprises
- Type: Private
- Founded: Los Angeles County, California, U.S. (1976)
- Founder: Reuben Sturman; Ron Braverman
- Headquarters: North Hollywood, California, U.S.
- Area served: Worldwide
- Key people: Ron and Chad Braverman
- Products: Novelties, sexual health items
- Brands: Pocket Rocket, iVibe, Optimale, WonderLand
- Number of employees: 500+
- Website: www.docjohnson.com

Doc Johnson is an American sex toy company. It was founded in 1976 by Reuben Sturman with Ron Braverman at the helm. It is run by Ron Braverman and his son Chad Braverman.

== Overview ==
It is one of the largest sex toy companies in the world and they manufacture the majority of their products at their factory in North Hollywood, California. As of 2012, it employs over 500 people, and has been described by Los Angeles Magazine as "the Procter & Gamble of sex toys".

== Product line ==
Among its other products, it manufactures products modeled on the anatomy of famous adult film stars and social media personalities that include Mia Malkova, Sasha Grey, Karlee Grey, Ms. Puiyi, and Kara Leona.
