= Hot Octopuss =

London-based sex toy company

- Official logo
- Industry: Sex toys
- Founded: March 2011 in London, England
- Founders: Julia Margo, Adam Lewis
- Headquarters: London, England
- Area served: Worldwide
- Key people: Adam Lewis (CEO), Julia Margo (COO)
- Website: www.hotoctopuss.com

Hot Octopuss is a London-based sex toy company. Founded in 2011 by Julia Margo and Adam Lewis, the first Hot Octopuss, Pulse (stylized as PULSE), also known as the "Guybrator", was released in September 2013. The male apparatuses oscillate to stimulate men. The PULSE range has been featured in Playboy, The Wall Street Journal, GQ Magazine, Men's Health and Cosmopolitan. Hot Octopuss products are available globally in over 50 countries.

== History ==
In 2008, while working in conference management, Lewis had an idea for a durable male sex toy. He discovered an article on Penile Vibratory Stimulation, which described a way to bring about ejaculation in men with spinal cord injuries, regardless of sensation below the waist. He went to Denmark to meet the scientists who had developed equipment to do this and obtained the patents to use the technology in his sex toy.

Lewis and partner Julia Margo created Pulse, which was described by Wired as a "Darth Vader-style vibro helmet for penises". It sold out in the first six months by word of mouth. In 2015, Pulse II, with a second motor was released. In 2016 the company released Pulse III.

In January 2016, after a Time Out survey revealed that 39% of male New Yorkers masturbated while at work, Hot Octopuss created a masturbation booth called GuyFi in New York City that invited men to self-stimulate their penises to ejaculation.

Hot Octopuss' was featured in "Pillow Talk" that had sex expert, Jenny Block (who blogs regularly for Huffington Post) riding around Manhattan on a four-poster bed. The event was featured on ABC's Nightline.

== Products timeline ==
- 2013 PULSE v1 (now discontinued)
- 2015 PULSE II (now discontinued)
- 2015 PULSE II SOLO (now discontinued)
- 2016 PULSE DUO launched
- 2017 Pocket PULSE
- 2017 Pocket PULSE Remote (now discontinued)
- 2017 Queen Bee launched (now discontinued)
- 2018 ATOM launched
- 2018 ATOM PLUS launched
- 2019 JETT launched
- 2019 DiGiT launched
- 2019 PULSE SOLO ESSENTIAL launched
- 2019 PULSE SOLO LUX launched
- 2019 AMO launched
- 2021 KURVE launched
- 2021 ATOM PLUS LUX launched
- 2021 PULSE SOLO INTERACTIVE in partnership with KIROO (no future production planned)
- 2023 PULSE QUEEN launched
- 2026 JETT TURBO launched

== Partners ==
Hot Octopuss products are sold directly via their website and also are available via Lovehoney, Adam & Eve, Amazon and other global distributors.

== Awards ==
Some awards are:

- 2014. XBIZ Awards, for Couples Sex Toy Of The Year with the PULSE
- 2014. ETO Awards, for Best Male Product with the PULSE
- 2015. XBIZ Awards, for Male Sex Toy of the Yearwith the PULSE II
- 2018. XBIZ Awards, for Male Sex Toy/Line Of The Year
- 2021. XBIZ Europa Awards, for Luxury Pleasure Product of the Year with the KURVE
