= Third World Media =

Adult film production company

- Company type: Private
- Industry: Pornography
- Founded: 1999; 27 years ago
- Founder: Steve Scott and Ed Hunter
- Headquarters: Chatsworth, California, US
- Products: Pornographic films
- Owner: Steve Scott & Ed Hunter
- Website: www.thirdworldxxx.com

Third World Media is an American independent adult entertainment production studio founded in 1999 by Steve Scott and director Ed Hunter. It was one of the first American producers of entertainment featuring performers exclusively from outside the United States.

== Company history ==
The company, initially named Asian Eyes Pictures, placed an emphasis on Japanese hardcore content in its early years. As the company grew, it expanded its production to Southeast Asia and South America. In late 2006, Third World Media added Katana, a high-end Japanese lineup featuring popular Japanese AV stars and scripted, subtitled story lines.

Scott, a fluent Japanese speaker, credits the growth of his company to his extensive travels in Asia. When Third World Media entered the adult market, the Japanese product entering the US market was produced for the Japanese domestic market, where penetration is blurred, or "mosaiced" to conform with their laws. Third World Media produces movies for distribution outside Japan, and its hardcore products are shot without mosaics.

Like the company's Asian titles, its Latin titles, which include transgender titles, are also produced to be sold primarily in the American market. Third World Media's veteran in-house director Ed Hunter makes frequent travels to South America to find performers who have not been seen by American audiences. The company also added John Florian as its sales manager in January 2008.

The company is also the exclusive distributor for performer Gia Darling's production company, Gia Darling Entertainment. Other adult film stars featured in Third World Media movies include Mai Haruna, Monica Mattos, Chocoball Mukai, Ed Powers, Allanah Starr, and Gia Darling, among others. Japanese AV idols Junko, featured in The Kimono Kronicles, and Mirai Haneda, star of Hello Titty 3, signed at Third World Media's 2008 AVN Adult Entertainment Expo booth.

== Awards ==
The company was named the "Best Asian Release Company" in 2007 and 2008 by consumer adult video review magazine Adam Film World. At the 2009 AVN Awards the company won 'Best Ethnic-Themed Series – Asian' for Naughty Little Asians In January 2013 the company received XBIZ Awards for Transsexual Studio of the Year and Asian-Themed Series of the Year for Hello Titty.
