= Sportsheets International, Inc. =

American sex toy manufacturer

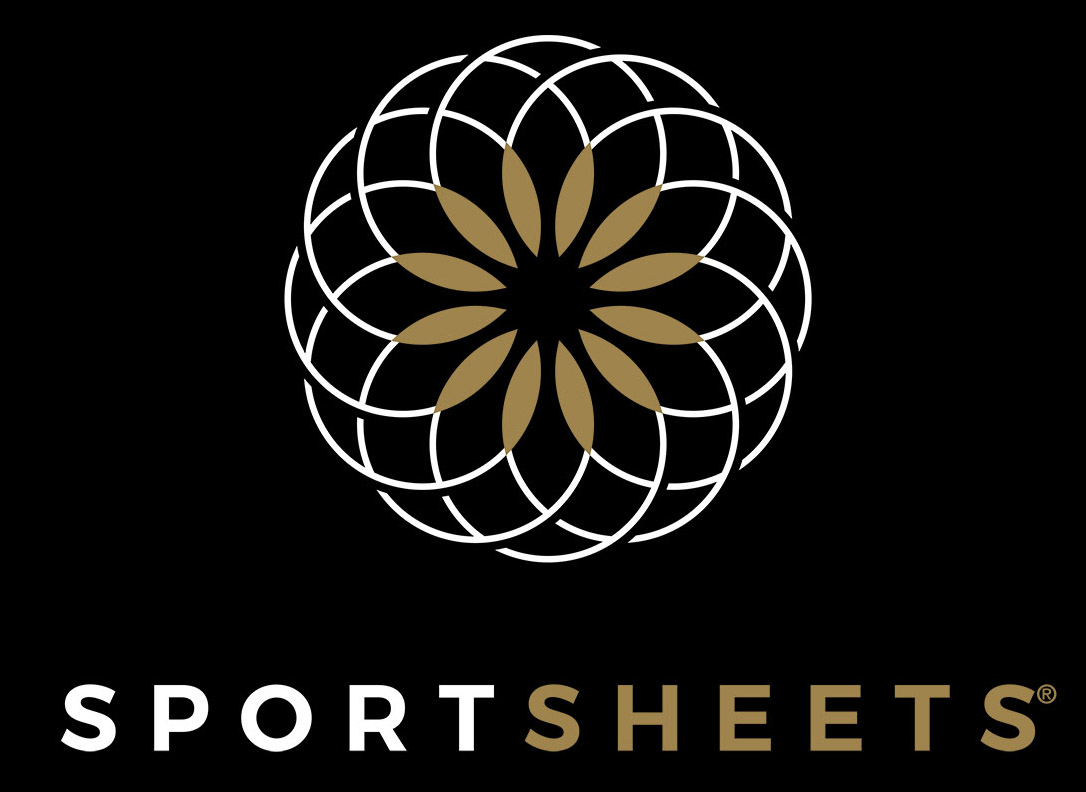
The Redesigned (2018) Sportsheets logo

Sportsheets International, Inc., nicknamed Sportsheets (after its first product), is an international sex toy manufacturer headquartered in Huntington Beach, California, United States. The company was founded in 1993. Sportsheets manufactures and sells bondage and sex products with a product line with over 300 specialty items.

== History ==
The company Sportsheets International, Inc. grew from a single product, the Sportsheet. In the mid-1980s, Tom Stewart saw David Letterman stick to a Velcro wall. Having run the idea of being stuck to Velcro during sex by friends and their wives and girlfriends, Tom discovered something else. Most women would try it if they were able to get themselves free. Soon Tom spoke with a representative at Velcro and spoke about his idea. The representative gave him some sample material, and with the help of a friend that was a seamstress, had a bed sheet made out of the material. After many attempts at finding a way to stick a person to the sheet, Tom and his brother came up with the idea of using Anchor Pads and Velcro Cuffs. The Velcro Cuffs could be hooked onto the Anchor Pads, and the Anchor Pads would stick to the sheets. The anchor pads can hold a person to the bed, but can be removed if pulled from the corners.

== Activities ==
Since 1993, Sportsheets International, Inc. has been selling adult products. With their evolving catalog of adult products, Sportsheets became a worldwide phenomenon. In 1999, Tom brought his sister, Julie Stewart, on board as president to lead business operations, and the company has grown since. Updated versions of the Sportsheet continue to be among the company's bestseller item.
