= Abbywinters.com =

Pornographic film production company and website

Abby Winters
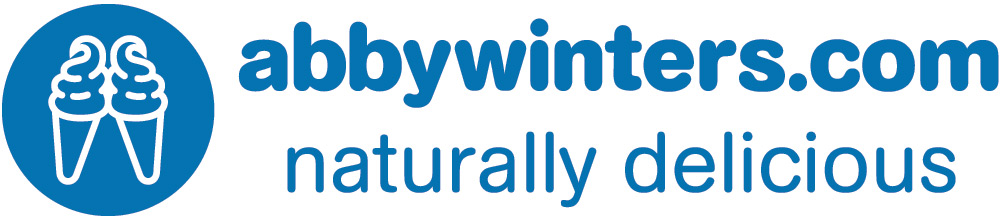
- Website type: Pornographic paysite
- Owner: Garion Hall
- Website: AbbyWinters.com
- Registration: Monthly fee
- Launched: 8 October 2000 (26 years ago)
- Current status: active

abbywinters.com (or simply Abby Winters) is a pornographic paysite largely revolving around nude modelling pictorials and lesbian and solo sex acts by female models. It claims all-female shooting crews and is part of the "natural", reality-based porn market. The site was launched in the year 2000 and has since been split into three "mini-sites" known as 'Solo', 'Girl-Girl', and 'Intimate Moments' (masturbation).

Abby Winters originated as an Australian site with Australian participants and employees. It is now based in Amsterdam and intermixes its extensive Australian material with new material shot since its move. In addition to pictures and videos of erotic modeling and sex acts, the site also features a range of both scripted and unscripted content.

The site is noted for its mix of professional and amateur models, most of whom had never previously worked in erotic modelling. Material is typically captured with high-quality high-definition video and photography, together with somewhat atypical "signature" capture angles, and has no models with surgically enhanced breasts. Models wear very little make-up and many have a full patch of pubic hair. In addition, the website claims that its photos are not retouched in any way (other than basic colour balancing).

In January 2008, abbywinters.com had about 30,000 subscribers.

In 2010, responding to a changing political climate in the Australian government on the question of pornography's acceptability in the country, the company's offices were moved to the Netherlands. Prior to that relocation, the site's web servers had already been based in the Netherlands and the United States for quite some time.

== Description of content ==
Original logo

The website features female models typically between the ages of 18 and 25. With the exception of those who are long-time employees of the organisation, of whom there are only a small number, almost all Abby Winters models are completely new to pornography. In photo-based shoots the women are photographed in their own homes and bedrooms and/or in outdoor settings, and usually begin wearing their own clothes and underwear, which they gradually shed. In videos, there may also be candid interviews, but videos on the site involving groups usually have a theme, or at least implied back-story, such as a yoga class beginning fully clothed and gradually shedding garments as the yoga session progresses. According to Adultreviews.com Review of Abby Winters, as of March 2018 there were 1,485 models featured on the site, with more than 500,000 images and 5,459 videos. New content was uploaded twice daily.

Wired.com writer Regina Lynn claimed that the site portrays sex more realistically than most pornography. Customers are able to suggest scenarios on the site's forum which are sometimes filmed. After establishing a rough scenario for each shoot the production team then lets the performers decide how fast the scene progresses, and which sex acts they will perform. It is claimed that all scenes are filmed by women, some of whom have previously modelled for the site. Models are paid approximately US$500 for a solo masturbation scene, and US$800 for a sex scene with another model.

== The existence of Abby Winters as person ==
According to Garion Hall, Abby Winters is a woman he met in 1999 who wanted to shoot alternative porn and started a website. Garion was involved in running the commercial side. In 2003, she was no longer interested in the matter and Garion bought her out. The character is considered to be invented and a moniker for Garion Hall.

== Company status ==
On 1 June 2010, Hall announced that G Media was selling the business to his new Dutch company, and would be moving its operations to Amsterdam, Netherlands because of legal problems in Australia (see below for details). The company had been based in the Melbourne suburb of Fitzroy before their move. It now operates from an office in central Amsterdam.

In late 2007, the company had also briefly opened a second office in Sydney. In late 2007, the site partnered with Wicked Pictures as the exclusive distributor for Abbywinters.com DVDs.

The company claims to have regularly donated $1,000 a week to various organisations including Samba, ASACP, and other open source projects, as well as health aid organisations. Abby Winters was a "Sustaining Contributor" on the Free Software Foundation's Thank GNUs 2007, and on the OpenBSD's donations list. It also made a A$78,000 donation to the Black Saturday bushfires appeal.

On 28 June 2023, site owner Garion Hall announced that Abbywinters stopped producing new content due to lack of profitability and the inability to find suitable models.

== Criticism by former model Liandra Dahl ==
In 2007, ex-Abby Winters model Helen Corday (then known with the stage name as Liandra Dahl) wrote on her blog about privacy problems concerning G Media sites, which was picked up by the Herald Sun. Dahl was concerned that Abby Winters fails to inform young and inexperienced models that content may be available outside of the confines of the paysite, on file sharing networks, and how their involvement in pornography might revisit them inhibiting their future choices. Dahl later noted that the Herald Sun had "misquoted her" and that she didn't support the new laws against pornography in Australia.

== Police raid on G Media ==
On 16 June 2009, G Media offices in Melbourne were raided by Victoria Police as part of a wider "Operation Refuge". The Herald Sun article gave two grounds for the raid: that G-Media may have filmed an under-age model, and that G Media's DVD productions may have contravened Victoria's film classification laws. The report stated that CEO Garion Hall was arrested but released later the same day, and claimed that the raid was made in response to information provided by the paper. G Media later released a statement stating that nothing had been seized in the raid, and that the police were polite and amiable throughout. In December 2009 CEO Garion Hall was charged by Victoria Police with 54 counts of making objectionable films for gain, and possessing a commercial quantity of objectionable films. According to a post by Hall on the site, the charges against him were eventually dropped and two charges were filed against the company itself. A judge fined the company $6,000 on 28 May 2010. This combination of legal problems, law enforcement encounters, financial penalties, and a less accepting climate for the company's activities, led Hall to move the company out of Australia altogether and relocate it to Amsterdam.

== Censorship ==
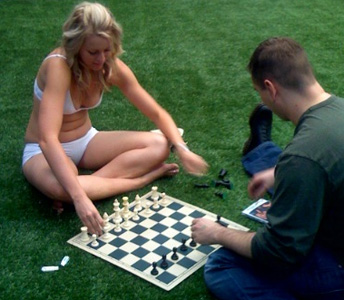
Abby Winters girl plays chess with a fan at AVN 2008

Abbywinters.com was included on a list published on WikiLeaks, on 19 March 2009, which was alleged to be the Australian Communications and Media Authority blacklist of websites which were due to be prohibited in Australia under the proposed Australian Firewall.

== Awards ==
- 2006 Australian Adult Industry Awards – 'Best Adult Website'
- 2007 Australian Adult Industry Awards – 'Best Adult Website'
- 2008 AVN Award – 'Best Amateur Series' for Intimate Moments
- 2011 AVN Award – 'Best Membership Site'
- 2012 XBIZ Award – 'Adult Site of the Year (Solo/All-Girl)'
- 2013 XBIZ Award – 'All-Girl Release of the Year' for Girls With Girls
