= AVN Award for Male Performer of the Year =

Pornographic film award presented annually by AVN

- AVN award for contributions of male performers to pornography
- Awarded for: Best Performance by a Male Performer
- Sponsored by: AVN
- Location: Las Vegas
- Country: USA
- Presented by: AVN Media Network
- First award: 1993; 33 years ago
- Final award: 2026
- Most recent winner: Vince Karter

Highlights
- Most wins: Manuel Ferrara (6 awards)
- Most nominations: Manuel Ferrara and Erik Everhard (14 nominations)
- Total awarded: 34
- First winner: Rocco Siffredi
- Website: avnawards.avn.com

The AVN Award for Male Performer of the Year is an award that has been given annually by sex industry company AVN since the award's inception in 1993.

First recipient of the award was Rocco Siffredi, who was awarded at 10th AVN Awards in 1993. As of 2026, Manuel Ferrara is the most honored pornographic actor with six awards followed by Lexington Steele, Mick Blue and Evan Stone with three awards, while four pornographic actors–Rocco Siffredi, James Deen, Small Hands and Tom Byron–have won the award two times. Tommy Pistol is the oldest recipient of the award at the age of 45 in 2022 and James Deen is the youngest recipient of the award at the age of 22 in 2009. The most recent recipient is Vince Karter, who was honoured at the 42nd AVN Awards in 2026.

== Winners and nominees ==
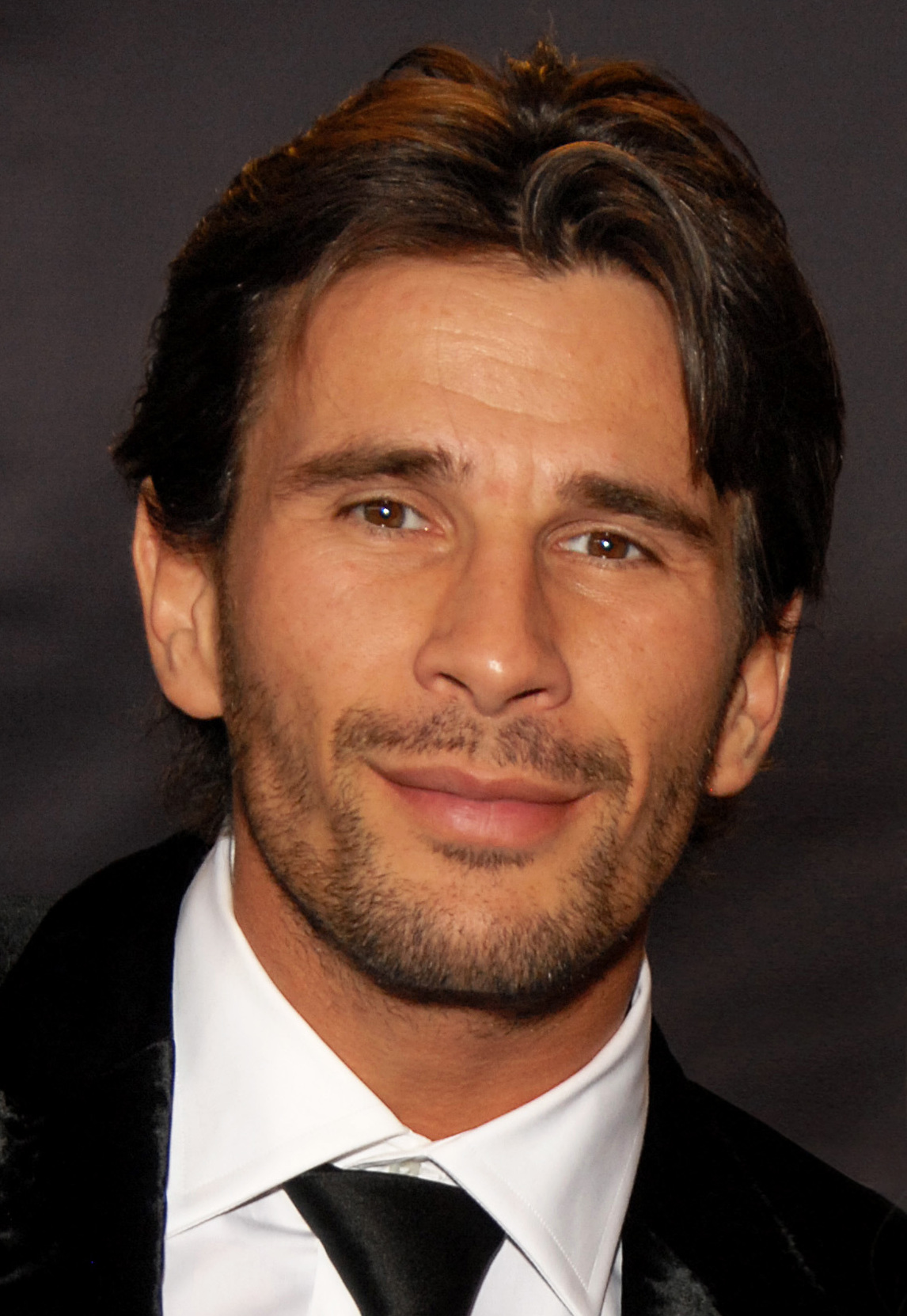
Manuel Ferrara has been the most frequent winner of the award (six times).

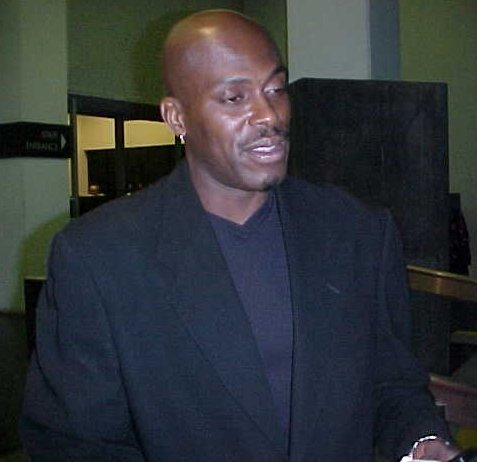
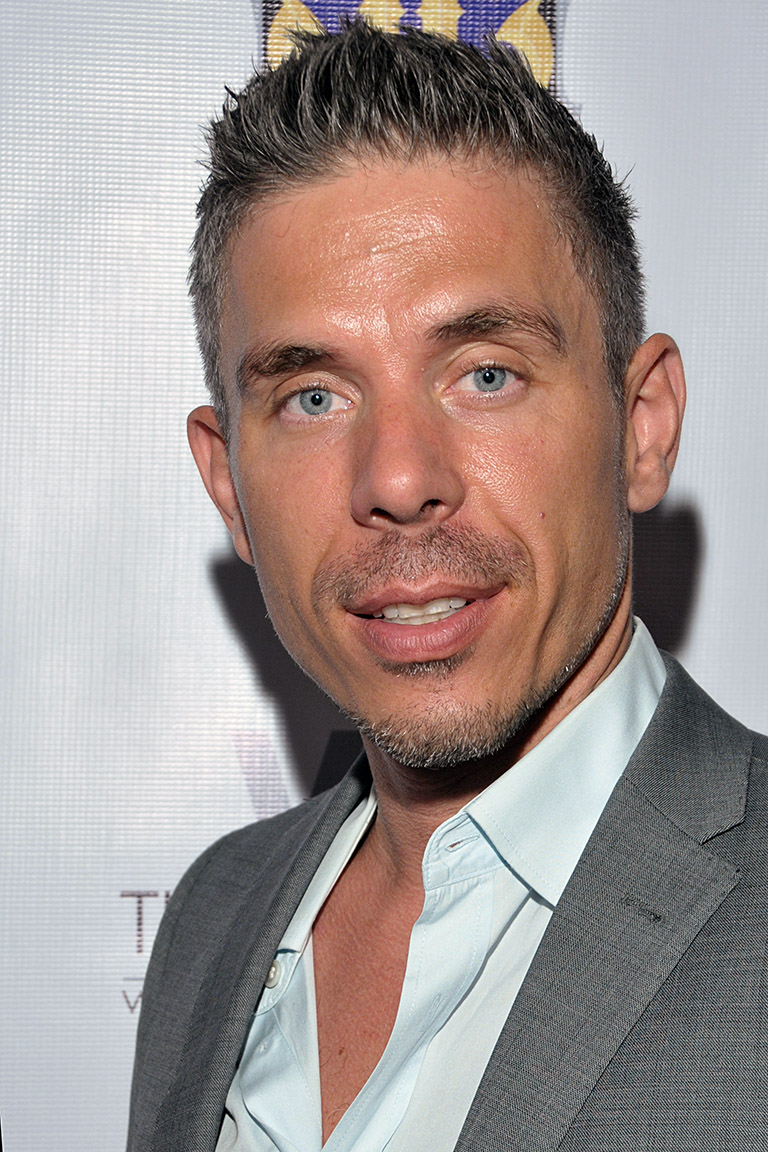
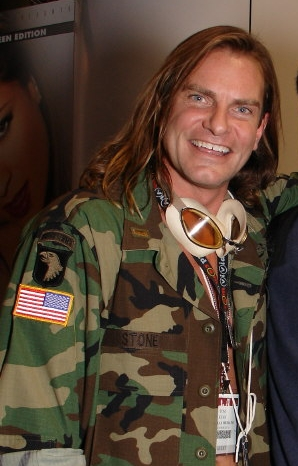
Lexington Steele (top), Mick Blue (middle) and Evan Stone (bottom) have won the award three times each.
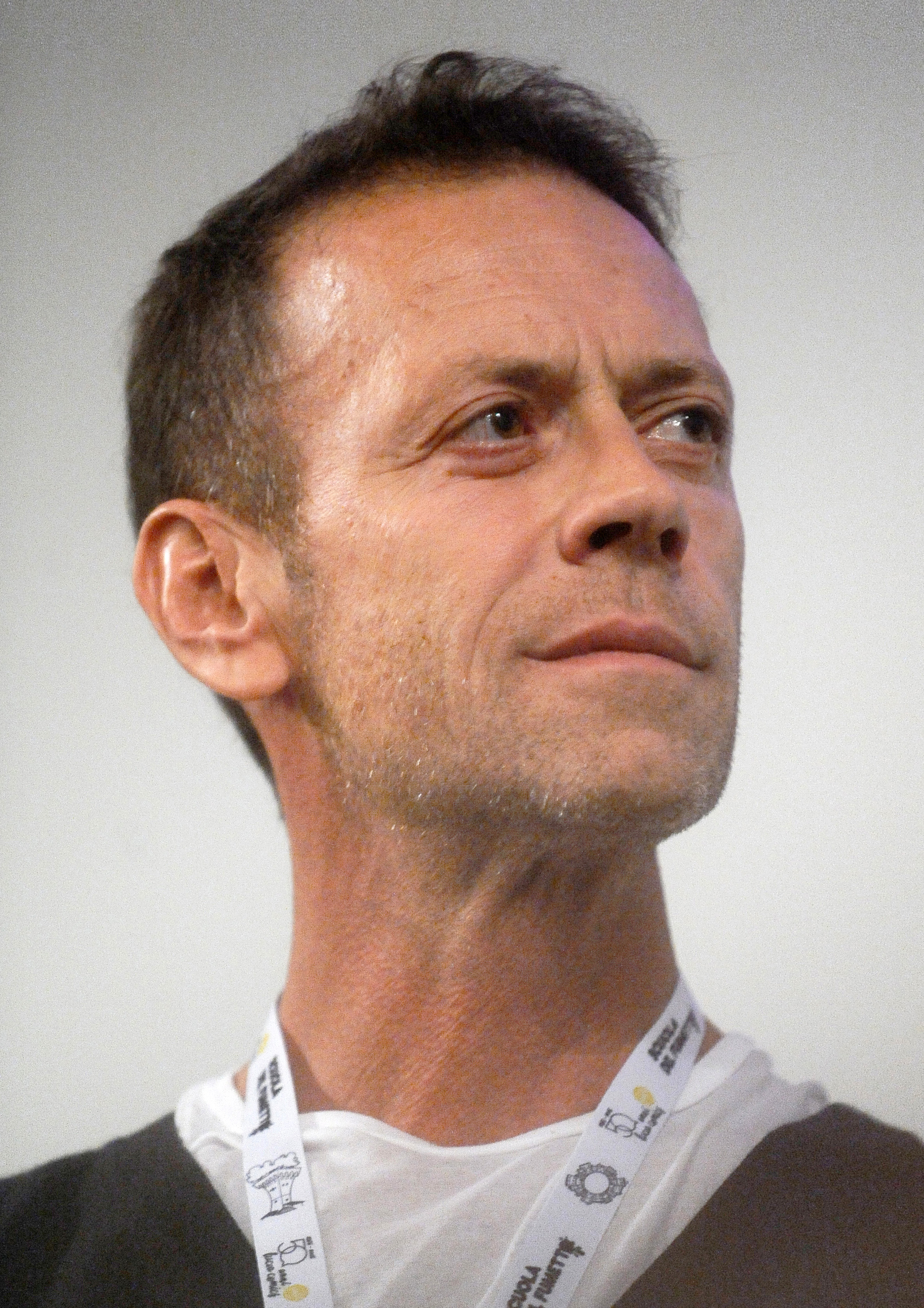
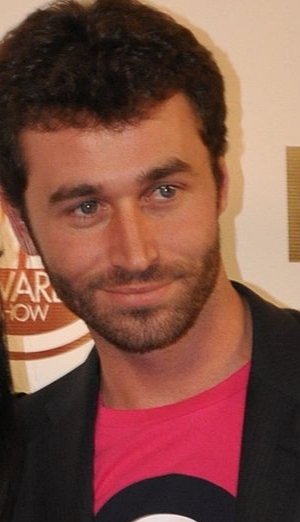
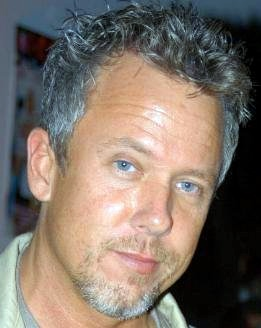
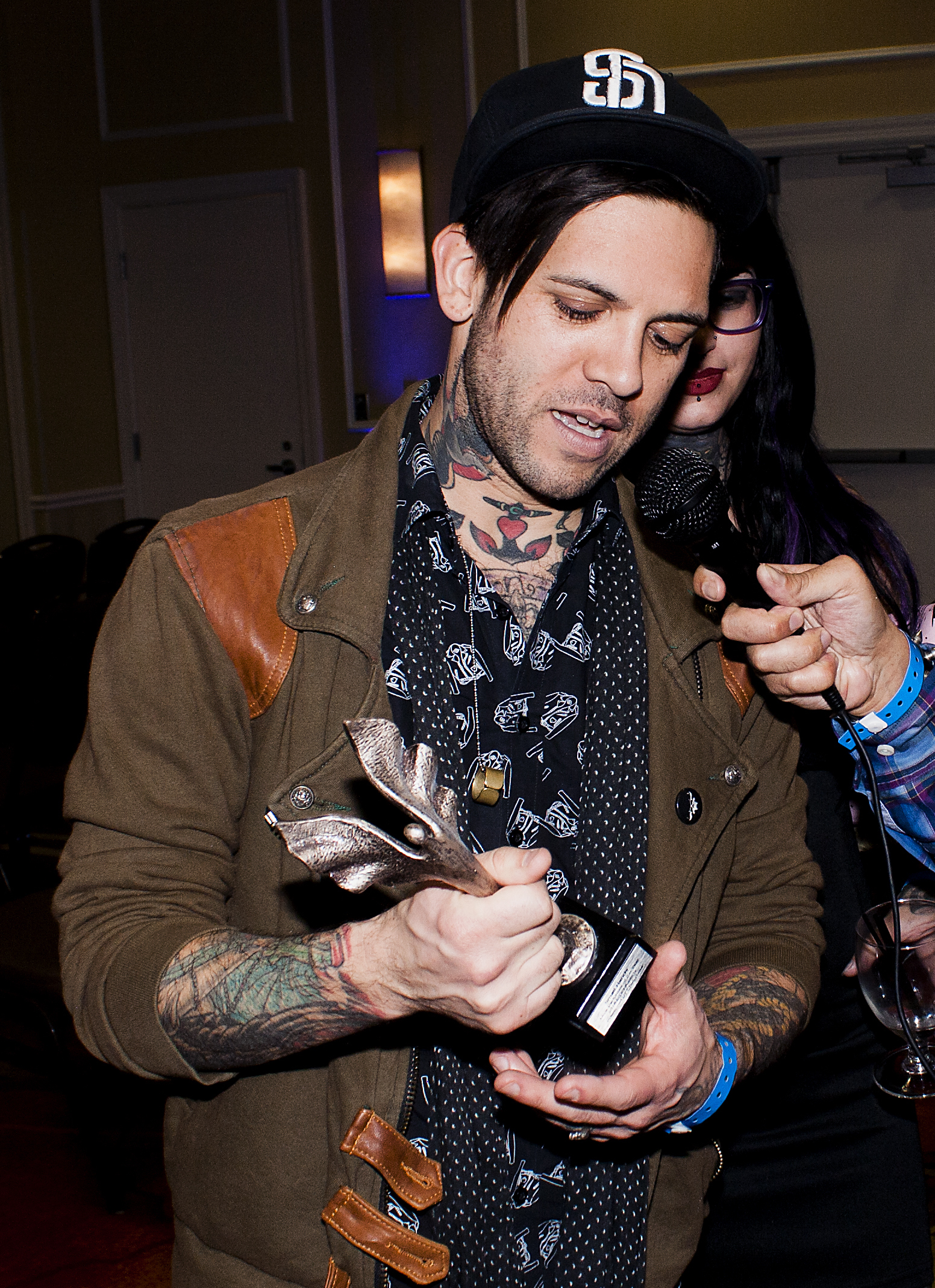
From top to bottom: Rocco Siffredi, James Deen and Tom Byron and Small Hands have won the award two times each.

=== 1990s ===
Year	Photo	Winner	Nominee(s)	Ref(s)
1993 (10th)		Rocco Siffredi	Mike Horner	
1994 (11th)		Jonathan Morgan	T. T. Boy; Jon Dough; Steve Drake; Mike Horner; Sean Michaels; Rocco Siffredi; Joey Silvera; Max Steiner; Marc Wallice	
1995 (12th)		Jon Dough	Sean Michaels; Alex Sanders	
1996 (13th)		Rocco Siffredi	T. T. Boy; Jon Dough; Steve Hatcher; Steven St. Croix; Alex Sanders; Tony Tedeschi	
1997 (14th)		T. T. Boy	Tom Byron; Mark Davis; Sean Michaels; Rodney Moore; Jonathan Morgan; Ed Powers; Steven St. Croix; Alex Sanders; Rocco Siffredi; Jake Steed; Max Steiner; Vince Vouyer	
1998 (15th)		Tom Byron	Mark Davis; Rod Fontana; Jack Hammer; Dave Hardman; Mr. Marcus; Sean Michaels; Rodney Moore; Ed Powers; Jake Steed; Max Steiner; Vince Vouyer	
1999 (16th)		Tom Byron	Christoph Clark; Van Damage; Dave Hardman; Brandon Iron; Mr. Marcus; Sean Michaels; Alex Sanders; Kyle Stone; Vince Vouyer	

=== 2000s ===
Year	Photo	Winner	Nominees	Ref(s)
2000 (17th)		Lexington Steele	Chris Cannon; Christoph Clark; Luciano; Mr. Marcus; Sean Michaels; Herschel Savage; Rocco Siffredi; Randy Spears	
2001 (18th)		Evan Stone	Mark Davis; Dillion Day; Erik Everhard; Max Hardcore; Dave Hardman; Luciano; Mr. Marcus; Rocco Siffredi; Randy Spears; Nacho Vidal	
2002 (19th)		Lexington Steele	Christoph Clark; Anthony Crane; Dillion Day; Mr. Marcus; Rocco Siffredi; Evan Stone; Brian Surewood; Nacho Vidal	
2003 (20th)		Lexington Steele	Mark Davis; Dillon Day; Erik Everhard; Brandon Iron; Mr. Marcus; Wesley Pipes; Steven St. Croix; Michael Stefano; Evan Stone; Lee Stone; Brian Surewood	
2004 (21st)		Michael Stefano	Jay Ashley; T. T. Boy; Erik Everhard; Brandon Iron; Julian; Nick Manning; Mr. Pete; Randy Spears; Steven St. Croix; Lexington Steele; Evan Stone; Mark Wood	
2005 (22nd)		Manuel Ferrara	T. T. Boy; Ben English; Kurt Lockwood; Mr. Marcus; Mr. Pete; Randy Spears; Michael Stefano; Evan Stone; Mark Wood	
2006 (23rd)		Manuel Ferrara	Otto Bauer; Erik Everhard; Tommy Gunn; Kurt Lockwood; Mr. Marcus; Sean Michaels; Mr. Pete; Randy Spears; Lexington Steele; Michael Stefano; Evan Stone; Lee Stone; John Strong	
2007 (24th)		Tommy Gunn	Mark Ashley; Marco Banderas; James Deen; Erik Everhard; Manuel Ferrara; Kurt Lockwood; Scott Nails; Justin Slayer; Lexington Steele; Michael Stefano; Evan Stone; John Strong; Tony T.	
2008 (25th)		Evan Stone	Marco Banderas; James Deen; Shane Diesel; Erik Everhard; Manuel Ferrara; Tommy Gunn; Dirty Harry; Jean Val Jean; Charlie Macc; Nick Manning; Mr. Marcus; Mr. Pete; Randy Spears; Mark Wood	
2009 (26th)		James Deen	Mark Ashley; Marco Banderas; Mick Blue; Tom Byron; Erik Everhard; Manuel Ferrara; Tommy Gunn; Shorty Mac; Nick Manning; Randy Spears; Michael Stefano; Steven St. Croix; Evan Stone	

=== 2010s ===
Year	Photo	Winner	Nominees	Ref(s)
2010 (27th)		Manuel Ferrara	Marco Banderas; Mick Blue; Tom Byron; James Deen; Tony DeSergio; Erik Everhard; Mr. Marcus; Sean Michaels; Mr. Pete; Rocco Reed; Anthony Rosano; Evan Stone; Rico Strong; Prince Yahshua	
2011 (28th)		Evan Stone	Mick Blue; Tom Byron; James Deen; Erik Everhard; Manuel Ferrara; Tommy Gunn; Keiran Lee; Mr. Marcus; Scott Nails; Mr. Pete; Rocco Reed; Anthony Rosano; Keni Styles; Prince Yahshua	
2012 (29th)		Manuel Ferrara	Mick Blue; Tom Byron; James Deen; Erik Everhard; Tommy Gunn; Keiran Lee; Ramón Nomar; Mr. Pete; Rocco Reed; Anthony Rosano; Lexington Steele; Evan Stone; Nacho Vidal; Prince Yahshua	
2013 (30th)		James Deen	Mike Adriano; Mick Blue; Xander Corvus; Erik Everhard; Manuel Ferrara; Keiran Lee; Mandingo; Ramón Nomar; Mr. Pete; Tommy Pistol; Toni Ribas; Evan Stone; Nacho Vidal; Prince Yahshua	
2014 (31st)		Manuel Ferrara	Mick Blue; Xander Corvus; James Deen; Ryan Driller; Erik Everhard; Keiran Lee; Ryan Madison; Mandingo; Ramón Nomar; Tommy Pistol; Toni Ribas; Lexington Steele; Christian XXX; Prince Yahshua	
2015 (32nd)		Mick Blue	Mike Adriano; Xander Corvus; James Deen; Erik Everhard; Manuel Ferrara; Keiran Lee; Mr. Pete; Ramon Nomar; Tommy Pistol; Toni Ribas; Johnny Sins; Lexington Steele; Chris Strokes; Prince Yahshua	
2016 (33rd)		Mick Blue	Flash Brown; Xander Corvus; James Deen; Erik Everhard; Manuel Ferrara; Keiran Lee; Ramon Nomar; Tommy Pistol; Toni Ribas; Lexington Steele; Steven St. Croix; Chad White; Prince Yahshua	
2017 (34th)		Mick Blue	Xander Corvus; James Deen; Ryan Driller; Markus Dupree; Manuel Ferrara; Small Hands; Keiran Lee; Mandingo; Derrick Pierce; Tommy Pistol; Toni Ribas; Lexington Steele; Chris Strokes; Prince Yahshua	
2018 (35th)		Markus Dupree	Mick Blue; Xander Corvus; Charles Dera; Manuel Ferrara; Ricky Johnson; Keiran Lee; Mandingo; Ramón Nomar; Tommy Pistol; Toni Ribas; Johnny Sins; Jean Val Jean; Chad White; Prince Yahshua	
2019 (36th)		Manuel Ferrara	Mick Blue; Xander Corvus; James Deen; Dredd; Markus Dupree; Small Hands; Steve Holmes; Ricky Johnson; Jessy Jones; Keiran Lee; Mandingo; Ramón Nomar; Tommy Pistol; Johnny Sins	

=== 2020s ===
Year	Photo	Winner	Nominees	Ref(s)
2020 (37th)		Small Hands	Mick Blue; Xander Corvus; Charles Dera; Ryan Driller; Markus Dupree; Manuel Ferrara; Seth Gamble; Steve Holmes; Ricky Johnson; Keiran Lee; Isiah Maxwell; Ramón Nomar; Derrick Pierce; Tommy Pistol	
2021 (38th)		Small Hands	Mick Blue; Xander Corvus; Charles Dera; Damon Dice; Markus Dupree; Manuel Ferrara; Seth Gamble; Ricky Johnson; Keiran Lee; Isiah Maxwell; Ramón Nomar; Tommy Pistol; Jax Slayher; Prince Yahshua	
2022 (39th)		Tommy Pistol	Mick Blue; Dante Colle; Xander Corvus; Charles Dera; Oliver Flynn; Quinton James; Manuel Ferrara; Seth Gamble; Jax Slayher; Codey Steele; Isiah Maxwell; Ramón Nomar; Zac Wild; Michael Stefano	
2023 (40th)		Seth Gamble	Mick Blue; Nathan Bronson; Dante Colle; Dredd; Manuel Ferrara; Oliver Flynn; Anton Harden; Ricky Johnson; Isiah Maxwell; Ramón Nomar; Tommy Pistol; Codey Steele; Zac Wild; Michael Stefano	
2024 (41st)		Isiah Maxwell	Mick Blue; Nathan Bronson; Manuel Ferrara; Oliver Flynn; Seth Gamble; Maximo Garcia; JMac; Ricky Johnson; Alex Jones; Scott Nails; Ramón Nomar; Tommy Pistol; Codey Steele; Zac Wild	
2025 (42nd)		Vince Karter	Mick Blue; Nathan Bronson; Hollywood Cash; Dan Damage; Charles Dera; Seth Gamble; JMac; Ricky Johnson; Alex Jones; Isiah Maxwell; Scott Nails; Milan Ponjevic; Codey Steele; Zac Wild	
2026 (43rd)		Vince Karter	Parker Ambrose; Mick Blue; Hollywood Cash; Christian Clay; Charles Dera; Seth Gamble; Ricky Johnson; Jason Luv; Isiah Maxwell; Scott Nails; Milan Ponjevic; Codey Steele; Zac Wild	

== Superlatives ==
Superlative	Performer	Record
Performer with most awards	Manuel Ferrara	6
Performer with most nominations	Manuel Ferrara	14
Performer with most nominations	Erik Everhard	14
Performer with most consecutive wins	Mick Blue (2015-17)	3
Performer with most consecutive nominations	Keiran Lee (2011-21)	11
Performer with most nominations without ever winning	Erik Everhard	14
Oldest winner	Tommy Pistol	45
Youngest winner	James Deen	22

== Multiple winners and nominees ==
=== Multiple winners ===
Wins	Performer	Years
6	Manuel Ferrara	2005, 2006, 2010, 2012, 2014, 2019
3	Lexington Steele	2000, 2002, 2003
3	Mick Blue	2015, 2016, 2017
3	Evan Stone	2001, 2008, 2011
2	Rocco Siffredi	1993, 1996
2	James Deen	2009, 2013
2	Tom Byron	1998, 1999
2	Small Hands	2020, 2021
2	Vince Karter	2025, 2026

=== Multiple nominees ===
Nominations	Performer
14	Erik Everhard
14	Manuel Ferrara
14	Mick Blue
12	Ramon Nomar
11	Mr. Marcus
11	Keiran Lee
10	Evan Stone
10	James Deen
10	Prince Yahshua
10	Xander Corvus
10	Tommy Pistol
9	Mr. Pete
8	Lexington Steele
7	Sean Michaels
7	Randy Spears
7	Michael Stefano
6	Toni Ribas
6	Steven St. Croix
5	Rocco Siffredi
5	Mandingo
5	Tom Byron
5	Charles Dera
5	Seth Gamble
5	Isiah Maxwell
4	Max Hardcore
4	Mark Davis
4	Nacho Vidal
4	Tommy Gunn
4	Marco Banderas
4	Markus Dupree
4	Ricky Johnson
4	Scott Nails
4	Zac Wild
3	T. T. Boy
3	Alex Sanders
3	Johnny Sins
3	Christoph Clark
3	Dave Hardman
3	Dillon Day
3	Brandon Iron
3	Rocco Reed
3	Anthony Rosano
3	Mark Wood
3	Kurt Lockwood
3	Ryan Driller
3	Oliver Flynn
3	Ricky Johnson
3	Codey Steele
2	Mike Horner
2	Jon Dough
2	Jean Val Jean
2	Chad White
2	Small Hands
2	Chris Strokes
2	Mark Ashley
2	John Strong
2	Lee Stone
2	Brian Surewood
2	Luciano
2	Mike Adriano
2	Rodney Moore
2	Ed Powers
2	Vince Vouyer
2	Steve Holmes
2	Jax Slayher
2	Dante Colle
2	Dredd
2	Nathan Bronson
2	Codey Steele
2	Hollywood Cash
2	JMac
2	Milan Ponjevic

== See also ==
- AVN Award for Male Foreign Performer of the Year
- AVN Award for Best Actor
- AVN Award for Best Supporting Actor
- AVN Award for Female Performer of the Year
- AVN Award for Female Foreign Performer of the Year
- AVN Award for Transsexual Performer of the Year
