= 19th AVN Awards =

US adult industry award ceremony in 2002

- 2002 AVN Awards Show Program cover
- Date: January 11, 2002
- Site: The Venetian Las Vegas at Paradise, Nevada, U.S.A.
- Hosted by: Teri Weigel; Bobby Slayton
- Preshow hosts: Chi Chi LaRue
- Produced by: Gary Miller
- Directed by: Mark Stone

Highlights
- Best Picture: Fade to Black (Best Film)
- Most awards: Fade to Black (8)
- Most nominations: Taboo 2001, Underworld (12)

The 19th AVN Awards ceremony, presented by Adult Video News (AVN), took place January 11, 2002 at the Venetian Hotel Grand Ballroom, at Paradise, Nevada, U.S.A. During the ceremony, AVN presented AVN Awards in more than 80 categories honoring the best pornographic films released between Oct. 1, 2000 and Sept. 30, 2001. The ceremony was produced by Gary Miller and directed by Mark Stone. Comedian Bobby Slayton hosted the show for the third time; his co-host was adult film star Teri Weigel.

Fade to Black won eight awards including Best Film and Best Director—Film for Paul Thomas. Other winners included Euphoria with seven trophies, Island Fever with three and numerous movies with two wins apiece.

== Winners and nominees ==
The nominees for the 19th AVN Awards were announced on November 9, 2002. Taboo 2001 and Underworld tied for the most nominations with 12 each, followed by Bad Wives 2, Fade to Black and Taken which each received 11. Euphoria followed with nine and Beast, Marissa and Unreal had eight apiece.

The winners were announced during the awards ceremony on January 11, 2002. Paul Thomas's win for Best Director—Film was his third; he won previously for Justine (1993) and Bobby Sox (1996). Nikita Denise was first European actress to win Female Performer of the Year.

=== Major awards ===
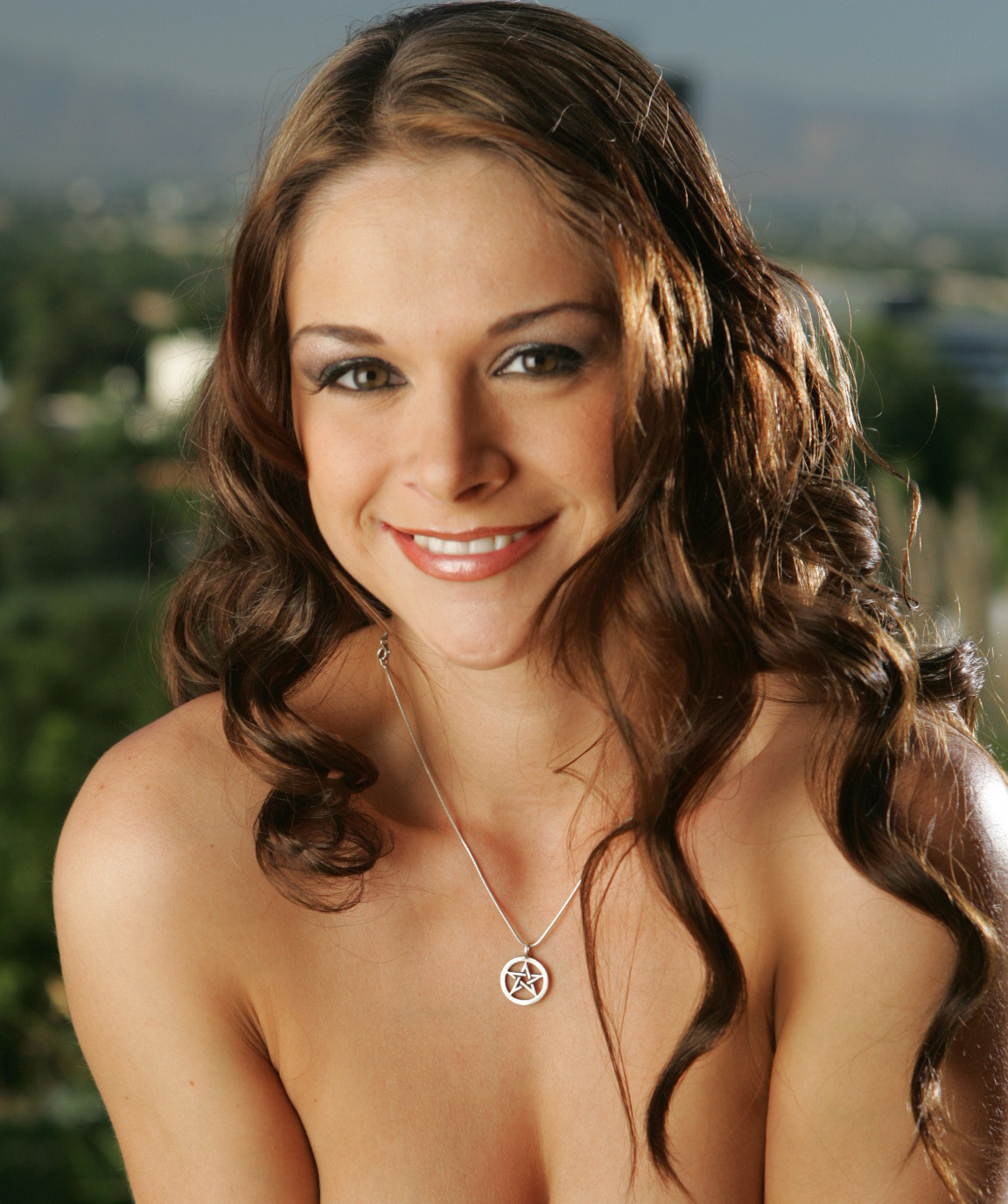
Violet Blue, Best New Starlet winner

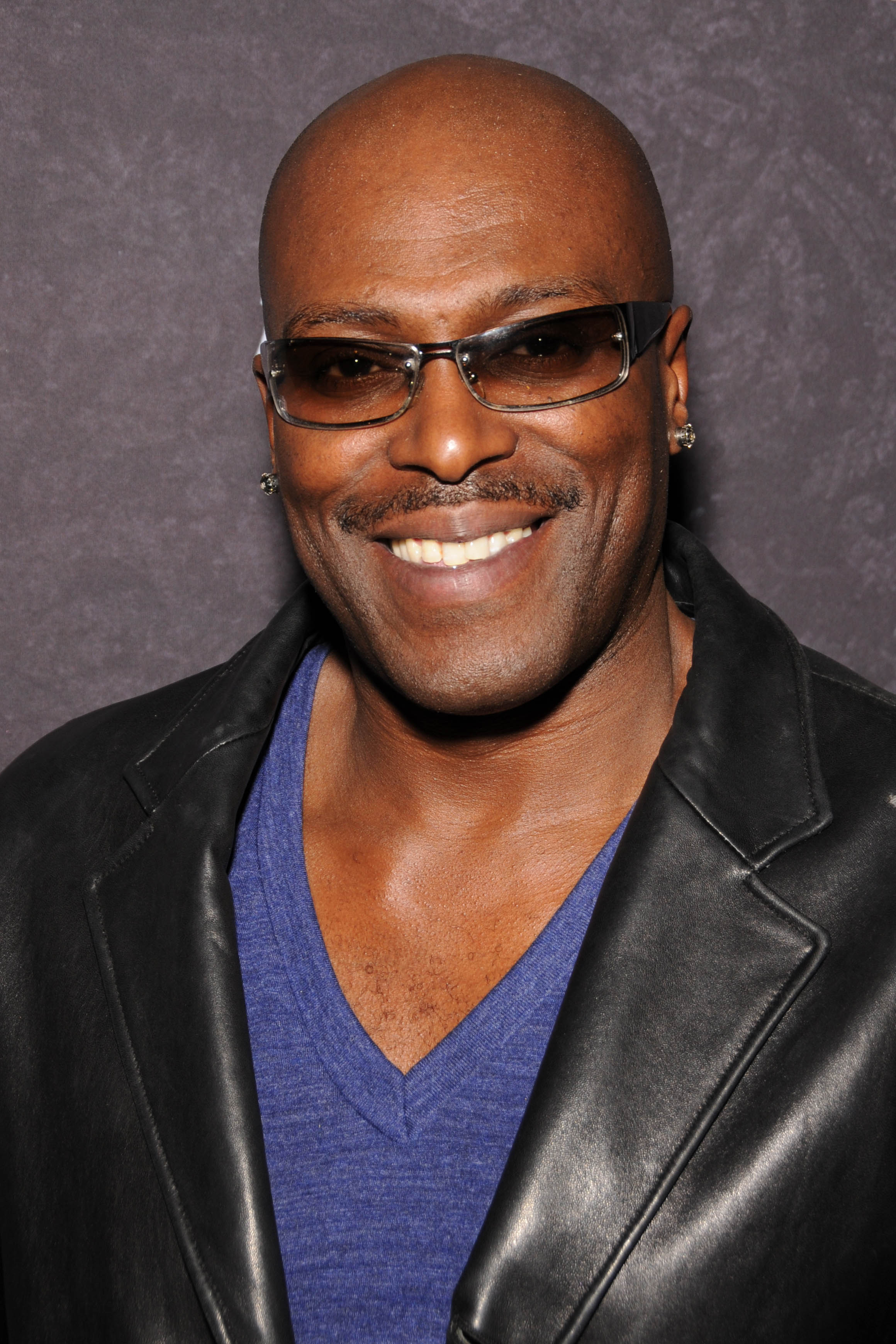
Lexington Steele, Male Performer of the Year winner

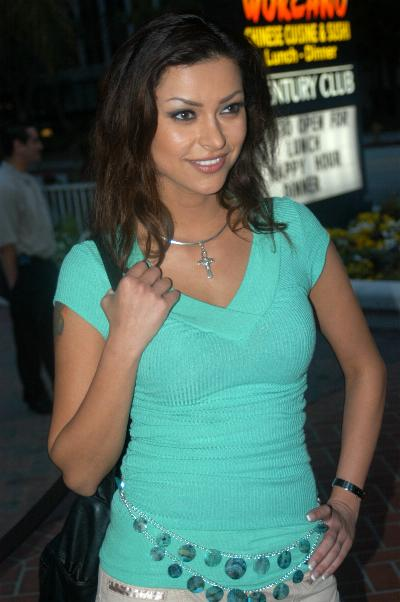
Nikita Denise, Female Performer of the Year

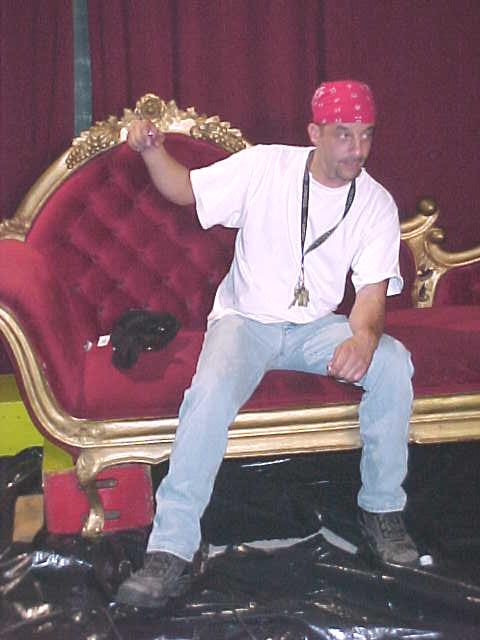
Anthony Crane, Best Actor—Film winner

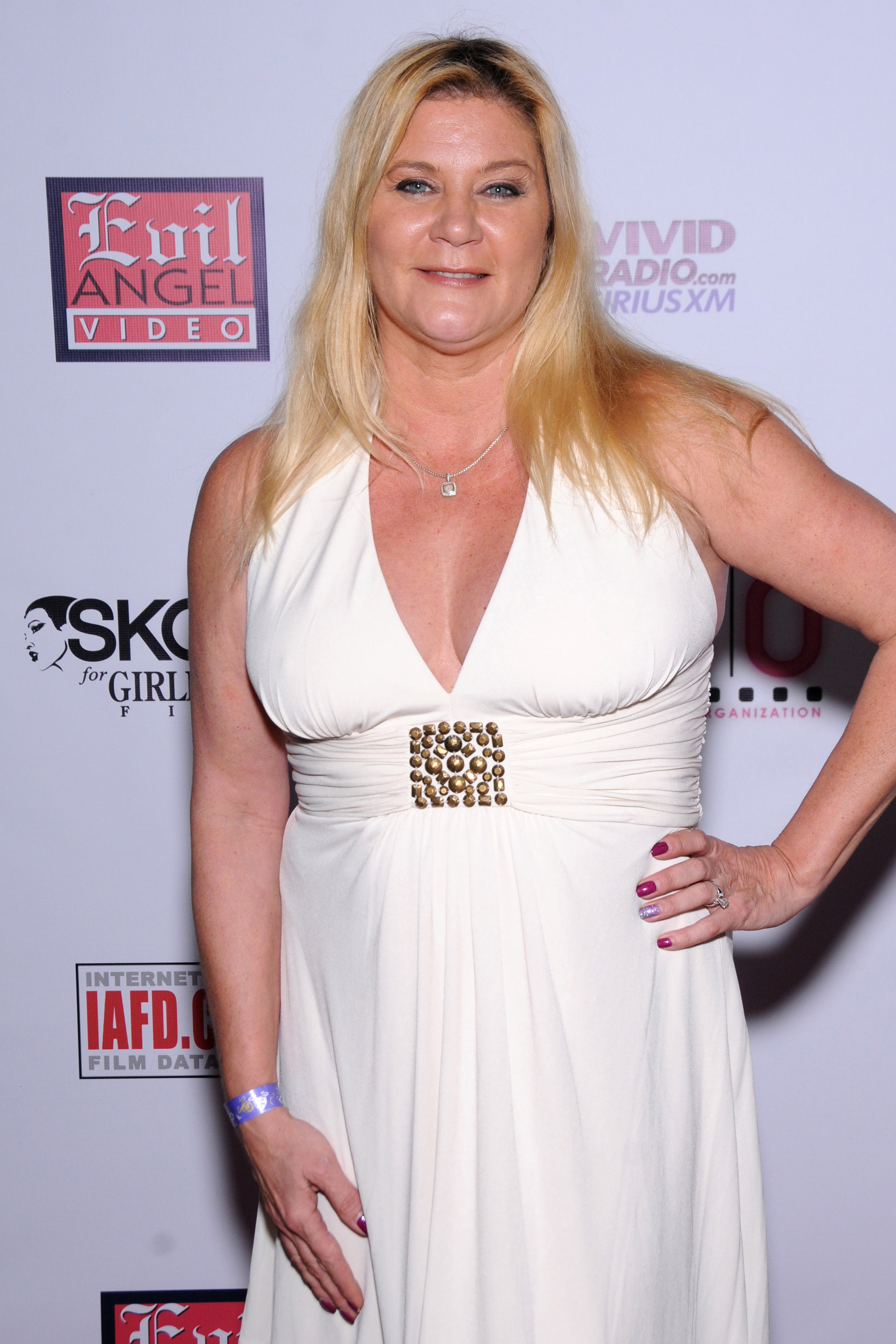
Ginger Lynn, Best Actress—Film winner

Winners are listed first, highlighted in boldface, and indicated with a double dagger (‡).

Best Film	Best Video Feature
**Fade to Black**‡; Bad Wives 2; Beast; Mafioso; Marissa; Prisoner; Taboo 2001; Taken; Underworld	**Euphoria**‡; The Black Room; Evil Twins; The Puppeteer; The Real Thing; Unreal; Valley Heat
Best DVD	Best New Starlet
**Unreal**‡; Appassionata; Aria; Crossroads; Dark Angels: Special Edition; Hell, Whores and High Heels; Facade; Intimate Expressions; M Caught In The Act; New Wave Hookers 6	**Violet Blue**‡; Meriesa Arroyo; Calli Cox; Kate Frost; Haven; Logan LaBrent; Justine Romée; Stevie; Zana
Male Performer of the Year	Female Performer of the Year
**Lexington Steele**‡; Christoph Clark; Anthony Crane; Dillion Day; Mr. Marcus; Rocco Siffredi; Evan Stone; Brian Surewood; Nacho Vidal	**Nikita Denise**‡; Chloe; Jewel De'Nyle; Bridgette Kerkove; Monique; Taylor St. Claire; Serenity; Sydnee Steele; Ava Vincent
Best Actor—Film	Best Actress—Film
**Anthony Crane, Beast**‡; Dale DaBone, Fade To Black; Dillion Day, Underworld; Mickey G., Free Sex On Earth; Herschel Savage, Mafioso; Randy Spears, Bad Wives 2; Evan Stone, Taken	**Ginger Lynn, Taken**‡; Alexa, Shrink Wrapped; Taylor Hayes, Fade To Black; Lola, Free Sex On Earth; Raylene, Bad Wives 2; Nicole Sheridan, Taboo 2001; Sydnee Steele, Mafioso; Syren, Taboo 2001; Ava Vincent, Underworld
Best Actor—Video	Best Actress—Video
**Mike Horner, Euphoria**‡; Anthony Crane, Porn-o-Matic 2001; Joel Lawrence, The Hole Truth; Eric Masterson, The Black Room; Randy Spears, Shocking Truth; Steven St. Croix, Planet of the Babes; Valentino, Pimped By An Angel 2; Nacho Vidal, Face Dance Obsession	**Sydnee Steele, Euphoria**‡; Allysin Chaynes, Wonderland; Chloe, Unreal; Jewel De'Nyle, Forbidden Flesh; Lola, Destiny Calling; Gina Ryder, Nice Neighbors; Serenity, XXX Training; Inari Vachs, Beauty and the Bitch
Best Director—Film	Best Director—Video
**Paul Thomas, Fade to Black**‡; James Avalon, Taboo 2001; Veronica Hart, Taken; Michael Raven, Underworld; Ren Savant, Prisoner; David Stanley, Highway 2	**Brad Armstrong, Euphoria**‡; Nic Andrews, Exposed; Jim Enright, Wonderland; Red Ezra, Fast Cars and Tiki Bars; Cash Markman, Talk Dirty to Me 13; Jonathan Morgan, XXX Training; Antonio Passolini, Unreal; Mike Quasar, Valley Heat; Shawn Ricks, The Hole Truth; David Stanley, The Black Room
Best Supporting Actor—Film	Best Supporting Actress—Film
**Herschel Savage, Taken**‡; James Bonn, Mafioso; Dale DaBone, Limbo; Gino Greco, Free Sex On Earth	**Julie Meadows, Fade To Black**‡; April, Bad Wives 2; Nikita Denise, Rapunzel; Kylie Ireland, Bad Wives 2; Heather Lyn, Free Sex on Earth; Shanna McCullough, Mafioso; Sydnee Steele, Marissa
Best Supporting Actor—Video	Best Supporting Actress—Video
**Mike Horner, Wild Thing**‡; Herschel Savage, Infidelity; Randy Spears, Immortal; Steven St. Croix, Wonderland; Evan Stone, Cap'n Mongo's Porno Playhouse	**Ava Vincent, Succubus**‡; Diana DeVoe, Disturbed; Kelsey, Destiny Calling; Kylie Ireland, Vengeance; Bridgette Kerkove, The Gate; Inari Vachs, Dead Men Don't Wear Rubbers; Zana, XXX Training
Top Selling Tape	Top Renting Tape
**Snoop Dogg's Doggystyle**‡	**Island Fever**‡
Best All-Sex Video	Best Gonzo Tape
**Buttwoman Iz Bella**‡; Bring 'Um Young 3; Exposed; Fresh Meat 11; Love Shack; Service Animals 2; Welcum to Chloeville 3; Wicked Sex Party 3	**Balls Deep**‡; American Tushy 2; Ben Dover's End Games; Buttman's Bend Over Brazilian Babes 3; Christoph's Beautiful Girls; Cumback Pussy 42; Dirty Little Secrets 4; Hardcore Innocence 2; Please! 13; Service Animals 2; The Voyeur 19: Live in Europe Part 6; Young and Tight 2
Best Sex Comedy	Best Couples Sex Scene—Film
**Cap'n Mongo's Porno Playhouse**‡; Adult Movie; Let's Play Doctor; Lust World 2; Perfect Pair; Super Quick 2; XXX Training; Wonderland	**Taylor Hayes, Joey Ray, Fade To Black**‡; Ava Vincent, John Decker, Bad Wives 2; Monica Sweetheart, Joey Ray, Evolution; Sydnee Steele, Erik Everhard, Mafioso; Sydnee Steele, Lexington Steele, Marissa; Ryan Conner, Michael J. Cox, Portraits in Blue; Ginger Lynn, Evan Stone, Taken; Ava Vincent, Chris Cannon, Underworld
Best Anal Sex Scene—Film	Best All-Girl Sex Scene—Video
**Nicole Sheridan, Voodoo, Taboo 2001**‡; Jessica Drake, Evan Stone, Beast; Cassidey, John Decker, Marissa; Alexandra Silk, Herschel Savage, Taken; Taylor St. Claire, Lexington Steele, Underworld	**Chloe, Taylor St. Claire, Sindee Coxx, Felecia, Where the Girls Sweat 5**‡; Logan LaBrent, Goldie McHorn, Babes Illustrated 11; Kaylynn, Goldie, Kitty, Patricia, Candy World; Dru Berrymore, Keri Windsor, Kimi Lixx, Mia Smiles, one other, Charlie's Devils 2; Amber Michaels, Wanda Curtis, Decadent Divas 12; Bunny Luv, Isabella, Jezebelle Bond, Fast Cars and Tiki Bars; Mina, Judith, I Love Lesbians 9; Devinn Lane, Inari Vachs, Love Shack; Bionca, Daisy Chain, The Madam's New Maid; Jewel De'Nyle, Inari Vachs, No Man's Land 33; Pool Table Threeway, Sugar High Glitter City; Kylie Ireland, Bridgette Kerkove, Tushy Girl Lost

=== Additional Award Winners ===
These awards were announced, but not presented, in two pre-recorded winners-only segments shown on the ballroom's video monitors during the event. Trophies were given to the recipients off-stage:

- Adult Video Nudes: The Amazing Ty 19: Peehole Gangbang
- Best All-Girl Feature: The Violation of Kate Frost
- Best All-Girl Series: The Violation Of...
- Best All-Girl Sex Scene—Film: Raylene, April, Ryan Conner, Bobby Vitale, Eric Price, Erik Everhard, Randy Spears (Jail cell group), Bad Wives 2
- Best All-Sex DVD: Porno Vision
- Best All-Sex Film: Porno Vision
- Best Alternative Video: Wild Party Girls 2
- Best Anal Sex Scene—Video: Janice, Alberto Rey, David Perry, Frank Gun,[Leslie Taylor, Robert Ribot, Rocco: Animal Trainer 5
- Best Anal-Themed Series: Rocco's True Anal Stories
- Best Anal-Themed Feature: Heavy Metal 1
- Best Art Direction—Film: Andrew Blake, Blond & Brunettes
- Best Art Direction—Video: Britt Morgan, Wonderland
- Best Box Cover Concept: Unreal, VCA Pictures
- Best Cinematography: Andrew Blake, Blond & Brunettes
- Best Classic Release on DVD: The Opening of Misty Beethoven, VCA Interactive
- Best Continuing Video Series: Rocco: Animal Trainer
- Best Couples Sex Scene—Video: Kelly Stafford, Rocco Siffredi, Rocco's Way To Love
- Best Director—Foreign Release: Kovi, The Splendor of Hell
- Best DVD Authoring: VCA Interactive
- Best DVD Extras: Dark Angels: Special Edition, Digital Sin
- Best DVD Menus: Cool Devices, Nu-Tech Digital
- Best DVD Packaging: The Gate, Wicked Pictures DVD
- Best Editing—Film: Tommy Ganz, Fade to Black
- Best Editing—Video: Sydney Michaels, Island Fever
- Best Ethnic-Themed Series: Chica Boom
- Best Ethnic-Themed Video: Freakazoids
- Best Foreign Release: Christoph's Beautiful Girls
- Best Foreign Vignette Series: Euro Angels Hardball
- Best Foreign Vignette Tape: The Splendor of Hell
- Best Gonzo Series: Buttman
- Best Group Sex Scene—Film: Taylor Hayes, Taylor St. Claire, Dale DaBone, Fade To Black
- Best Group Sex Scene—Video: Ava Vincent, Bridgette Kerkove, Nikita Denise, Herschel Savage, Trevor, Succubus
- Best Interactive DVD: Virtual Sex with Devon
- Best Music: Tha Eastsidaz, Others, Snoop Dogg's Doggystyle
- Best Non-Sex Performance—Film or Video: Paul Thomas, Fade to Black
- Best Oral-Themed Feature: Shut Up & Blow Me! 25
- Best Oral-Themed Series: Shut Up & Blow Me!
- Best Overall Marketing Campaign—Company Image: Digital Playground
- Best Overall Marketing Campaign—Individual Title or Series: Taboo 2001, Metro Studios
- Best Packaging: Beautiful/Nasty, Wicked Pictures
- Best Pro-Am or Amateur Series: Cherries, Up and Cummers (tie)
- Best Pro-Am or Amateur Tape: The Real Naturals 1
- Best Screenplay—Film: Dean Nash, Fade to Black
- Best Screenplay—Video: David Aaron Clark, Brad Armstrong, Euphoria
- Best Sex Scene in a Foreign Release: Amanda Angel, Katherine Count, guys in masks, Rocco: Animal Trainer 4
- Best Solo Sex Scene: Kim Chambers, Edge Play
- Best Special Effects: Dick Roundtree, Euphoria
- Best Specialty Tape—Big Bust: Pussyman's Big Tit Paradise
- Best Specialty Tape—Bondage & S/M: Virgin Kink 19
- Best Specialty Tape—Other Genre: Barefoot Confidential 13
- Best Specialty Tape—Spanking: Stocking Strippers Spanked
- Best Tease Performance: Tera Patrick, Island Fever
- Best Transsexual Tape: Rogue Adventures 13
- Best Videography: Jake Jacobs, Perry Tratt, Euphoria
- Best Vignette Series: Grrl Power!
- Best Vignette Tape: Grrl Power! 5
- The Hot Video Award (Best American Release in France): Dark Angels
- Most Outrageous Sex Scene: Kristen Kane, Herschel Savage, Rafe in "Pussy Face", Perverted Stories 31

=== Honorary AVN Awards ===
==== Reuben Sturman Award ====
- Gloria Leonard, Elyse Metcalf

==== Hall of Fame ====
AVN Hall of Fame inductees for 2002 were: Christoph Clark, Patrick Collins, Raquel Darrian, Samantha Fox, Janine Lindemulder, Missy, Michael Ninn, Rocco Siffredi, P. J. Sparxxx, Randy Spears, Tianna

=== Multiple nominations and awards ===
The following releases received the most nominations.

Nominations	Movie
12	Taboo 2001
12	Underworld
11	Bad Wives 2
11	Fade to Black
11	Taken
9	Euphoria
8	Beast
8	Marissa
8	Unreal

The following 17 releases received multiple awards:

Awards	Movie
8	Fade to Black
7	Euphoria
3	Island Fever
2	Blond and Brunettes
2	Dark Angels: Special Edition
2	Grrl Power! 5
2	Porno Vision
2	Rocco: Animal Trainer 4
2	Rocco: Animal Trainer 5
2	Shut Up and Blow Me! 25
2	Snoop Dogg's Doggystyle
2	The Splendor of Hell
2	Succubus
2	Taboo 2001
2	Taken
2	Unreal
2	The Violation of Kate Frost

== Presenters and performers ==
The following individuals, listed in order of appearance, presented awards or performed musical numbers, comedy or tributes. The show's trophy girls were Carmen Luvana and Monique Alexander.

=== Presenters (in order of appearance) ===
Name(s)	Role
Randy West; Jassie; Kiwi	Presenters of the awards for Best Couples Sex Scene—Film and Best Sex Comedy
Chloe Jones; Jodie Moore	Presenters of the award for Best Supporting Actress—Film and Best Supporting Actor—Film
Jenna Jameson; Nici Sterling	Presenters of the awards for Best Anal Sex Scene—Film and Best All-Girl Sex Scene—Video
Sydnee Steele; Joel Lawrence	Presenters of the awards for Top Selling and Top Renting Tapes of 2001
Paul Fishbein	Presenters of the Reuben Sturman Memorial Special Achievement Awards
Lexington Steele; Nikita Denise; Renee LaRue	Presenters of the award for Best Supporting Actress—Video and Best Supporting Actor—Video
Randy Spears; Briana Banks	Presenters of the awards for Best Director—Film and Best Director—Video
Julia Ann; Dascha; Vince Neil	Presenters of the awards for Male Performer of the Year and Female Performer of the Year
Tera Patrick; Sugar	Presenters of the award for Best New Starlet
Jessica Drake; Evan Stone; Amber Michaels	Presenters of the awards for Best DVD, Best All-Sex Video and Best Gonzo Tape
Devinn Lane; Ava Vincent	Presenters of the awards for Best Actor—Video and Best Actress—Video
Misty Rain; Stevie	Presenters of the awards for Best Actress—Film and Best Actor—Film
Nina Hartley; Ron Jeremy	Presenters of the awards for Best Video Feature and Best Feature Film

=== Performers ===
Name(s)	Role	Performed
Mark Stone and the AVN Orchestra	Musical Director	Orchestral accompaniment
Spearmint Rhino Dancers	Performers	Dancers on stage
Bobby Slayton	Performer	Standup comedy segment
Jenna Jameson; Steven St. Croix; Sydnee Steele; Sharon Mitchell; Jim South; Jonathan Morgan; Brad Armstrong; Al Goldstein; Bob Chinn; Larry Flynt and others	Performers	"Why We Love America" pre-recorded video tribute
Borialis	Performers	Musical number, “White Trash (Hip Rock)”

== Ceremony information ==
The awards show was held on the four-month anniversary of New York and Washington terrorist attacks and as such, began with a pre-recorded video tribute to post 9/11 U.S.A. featuring industry stars offering personal tributes to the country.

The show was not without its share of controversies. To keep the length of the show as short as possible by limiting the number of awards presented on stage, about 50 of the awards split into two groupings are announced in rapid succession on a screen with awards handed out later. In the first of these groupings the announcements were made by the animated characters of 2 Funky 4 U, a forthcoming animated feature by Private North America. However, some of the animated characters "offended some audience members as being allegedly racist."

Later, Snoop Dogg generated excitement by appearing on stage to accept the award for Best Selling Tape of 2001. After returning to his seat he was thronged by about 100 fans eager to meet or congratulate him, obstructing the view of people sitting behind, although the crowd did disperse without incident.

Then AVN publisher Paul Fishbein went on stage to present the Reuben Sturman Memorial Special Achievement Award to Cincinnati retailer Elyse Metcalf. Fishbein gave a recap of her high-profile obscenity trial and acquittal in the previous year but Metcalf gave the show an awkward moment because she was not there to accept the honor. Metcalf had left earlier "after becoming upset over remarks made to her by a financial supporter."

The show was recorded for later broadcast and a video of the awards show was issued by VCA Pictures.

=== Performance of year's movies ===
Snoop Dogg's Doggystyle was announced as the adult movie industry's top selling movie and Island Fever was the top renting movie of the previous year.

== In Memoriam ==
John Leslie and Joey Silvera ended the show by asking for a moment of silence in memory of late director Alex de Renzy who had died in 2001.

== See also ==
- AVN Award
- AVN Best New Starlet Award
- AVN Award for Male Performer of the Year
- AVN Award for Male Foreign Performer of the Year
- AVN Female Performer of the Year Award
- List of members of the AVN Hall of Fame
- 2002 GayVN Awards
