= Rodney Moore =

Rodney Moore may refer to:

- Rodney Moore (British Army officer) (1905–1985), British Army officer
- Rodney Moore (boxer) (born 1965), American boxer
- Rodney W. Moore (born 1963), American politician from the state of North Carolina
- Rodney Moore (actor), adult video performer and producer
