= Calli Cox =

American former pornographic actress (born 1977)

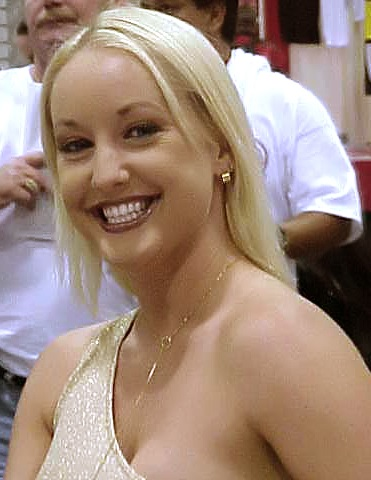
- Cox at Erotica Los Angeles on July 15, 2001
- Born: February 26, 1977 (age 49); Robinson, Illinois, U.S.
- Other names: Mrs. C. Frady; Calli Coxx~Cali Cox & Calli
- Occupation: Pornographic actress

Calli Cox (born February 26, 1977) is an American former pornographic actress, who worked as a teacher during the day and as a stripper at night before becoming an adult film performer. Cox was appointed as director of marketing and publicity for the punk rock label Redwood Records in 2003, the same year she retired from performing in adult films.

== Early life ==
In 1999, Cox graduated from Eastern Illinois University with a Bachelor of Science in education and started teaching that same year. She was a teacher at Effingham Junior High and a substitute teacher at Urbana High School, having worked for a year at each school. She taught eighth grade English and Reading.

== Career ==
Cox worked as a teacher during the day and as a stripper at night before becoming an adult film performer. She entered the adult film industry after moving to Los Angeles in February 2001. Her first scene was with Belladonna and Mr. Marcus in Oral Consumption 4 for Anabolic Video.

Cox became infamous after starring in the 2001–2002 Shane's World series of pornographic films with college students, including the executive vice president of the Arizona State University student body. On November 18, 2002, she appeared on The O'Reilly Factor to discuss the filming of Shane's World #32: Campus Invasion, which was shot on campus at Indiana University.

Cox began working as a publicist for Shane's World Studios in August 2002. She appeared in an episode of Inside Edition that aired on February 7, 2003, in which she defended the company's practice of filming sex scenes with students on college campuses. In 2003, she was appointed as director of marketing and publicity for the punk rock label Redwood Records. On July 9, 2003, she announced her retirement from performing in adult films. Her last scene was for the film College Invasion 2.

== Awards and nominations ==
Year	Ceremony	Result	Category	Film
2002	AVN Award	Nominated	Best New Starlet	—N/a
2002	AVN Award	Nominated	Best Group Sex Scene - Video (with Samantha Stylle & Lexington Steele)	Service Animals 2
2002	AVN Award	Nominated	Best Group Sex Scene - Video (with Renee LaRue, Shay Sights, Angel, Sana Fey, Nick Manning, Joel Lawrence, Pat Myne & Tony Pounds)	X-Rated Auditions 3
2002	AVN Award	Nominated	Best Group Sex Scene - Video (with Lola & Pat Myne)	Young and Tight 2
2002	NightMoves Award	Won	Best New Starlet (Editor's Choice)	—N/a
2002	XRCO Award	Nominated	Starlet of the Year	—N/a
2002	XRCO Award	Nominated	Best Threeway Sex Scene (with Samantha Stylle & Lexington Steele)	Service Animals 2
2003	AVN Award	Nominated	Female Performer of the Year	—N/a
2003	AVN Award	Nominated	Best Sex Scene Coupling - Video (with Tex)	Shane’s World 30
