= 34th AVN Awards =

US adult industry award ceremony in 2017

- Date: January 21, 2017
- Site: The Joint; Hard Rock Hotel and Casino, Paradise, Nevada, USA
- Hosted by: Aspen Rae; Riley Reid

Highlights
- Best Picture: Suicide Squad XXX: An Axel Braun Parody
- Most awards: Suicide Squad XXX: An Axel Braun Parody (9)

The 34th AVN Awards, presented by Adult Video News (AVN), honored the best pornographic movies and adult entertainment products of between October 1, 2015, and September 30, 2016, and took place on January 21, 2017, at The Joint in Hard Rock Hotel and Casino, Paradise, Nevada. During the ceremony, Adult Video News presented AVN Awards (often referred to as the Oscars of porn) in 117 categories. Webcam star Aspen Rae and reigning AVN Female Performer of the Year Riley Reid co-hosted the ceremony, each for the first time. Master of ceremonies was comedian Colin Kane.

Suicide Squad XXX: An Axel Braun Parody won the most awards with nine, including Best Movie and Best Parody along with Best Actress for Kleio Valentien.

== Winners and nominees ==
The nominees for the 34th AVN Awards were announced on November 17, 2016, at the annual AVN Awards Nominations Party at Avalon nightclub in Hollywood.

The winners were announced during the awards ceremony on January 21, 2017.

The major performer awards went to Adriana Chechik, AVN Female Performer of the Year Award; Mick Blue, Male Performer of the Year and Hollie Hendrix, Best New Starlet. In terms of movies, the big winners were Suicide Squad XXX: An Axel Braun Parody, The Submission of Emma Marx: Exposed, The Preacher's Daughter and Natural Beauties, each with three or more awards.

=== Major awards ===
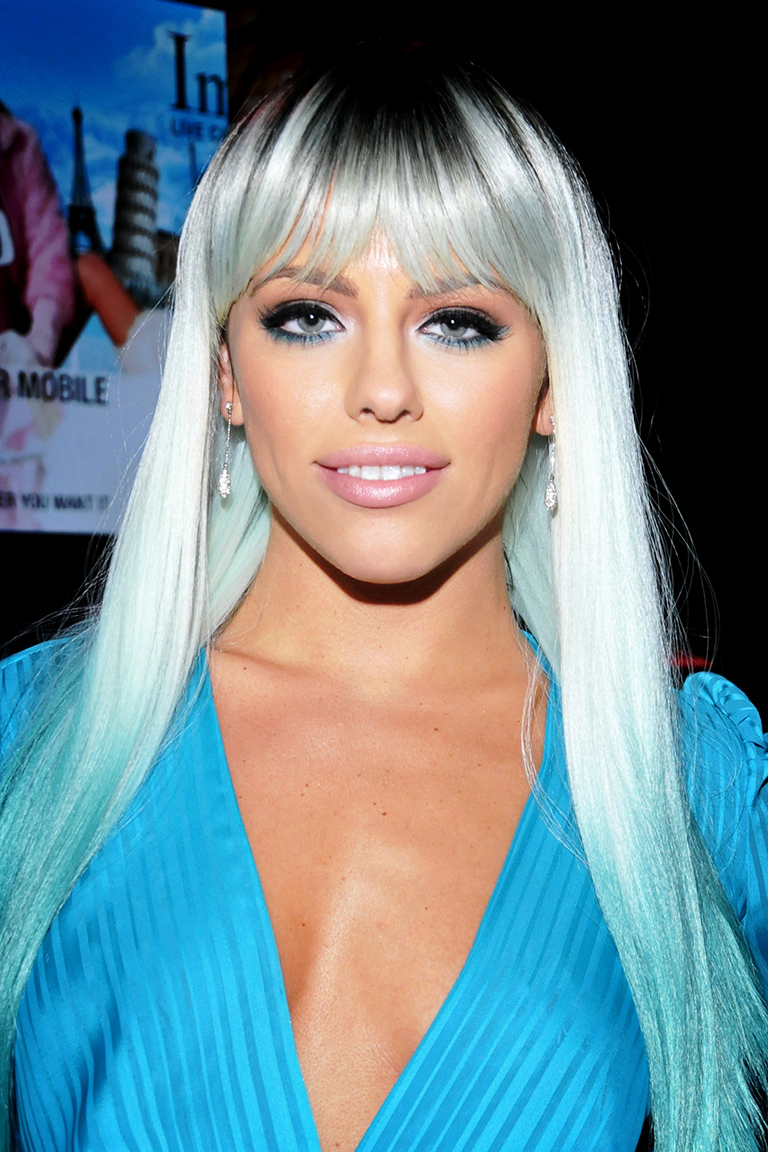
Adriana Chechik, winner of the 2017 AVN Female Performer of the Year Award

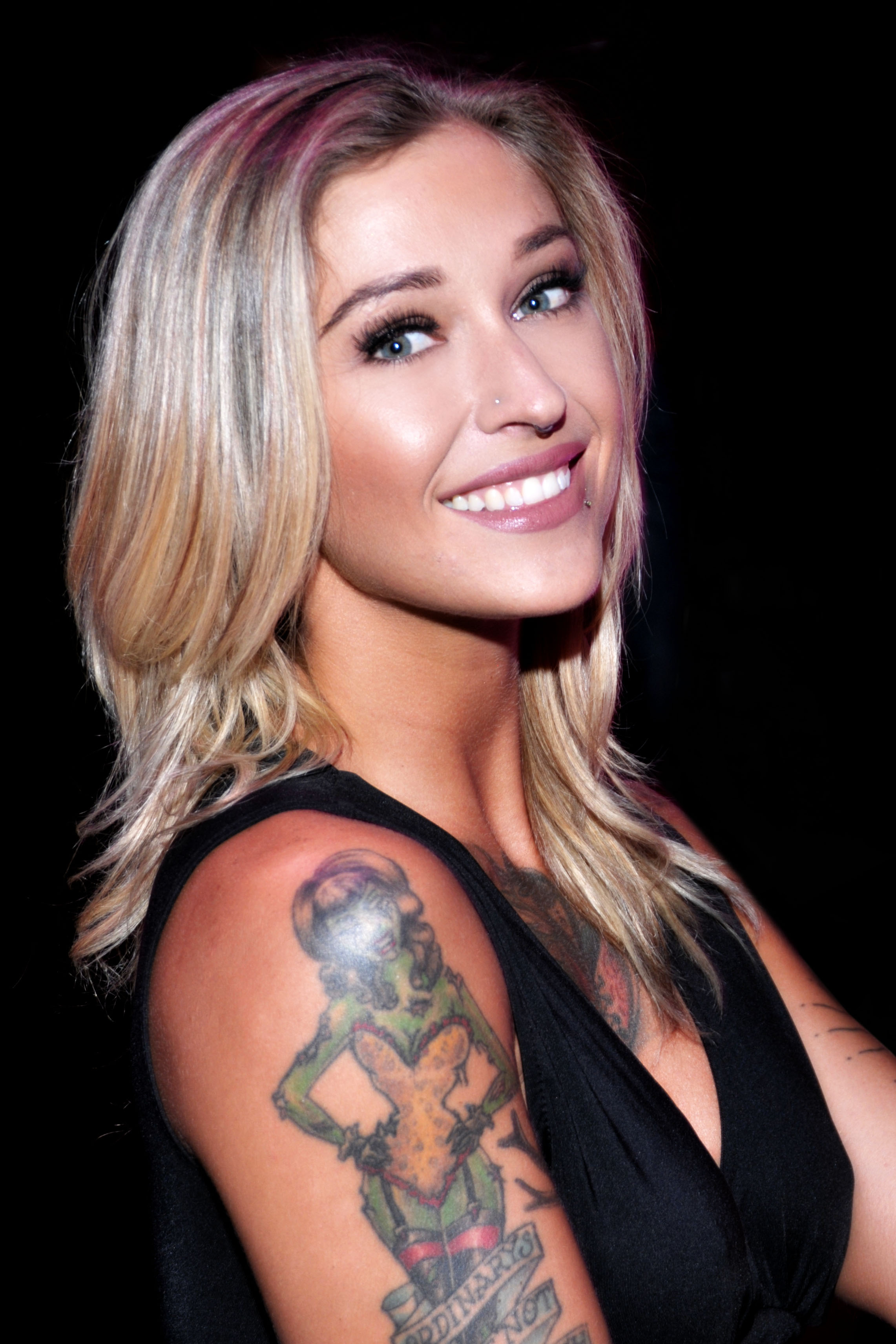
Kleio Valentien, Best Actress winner

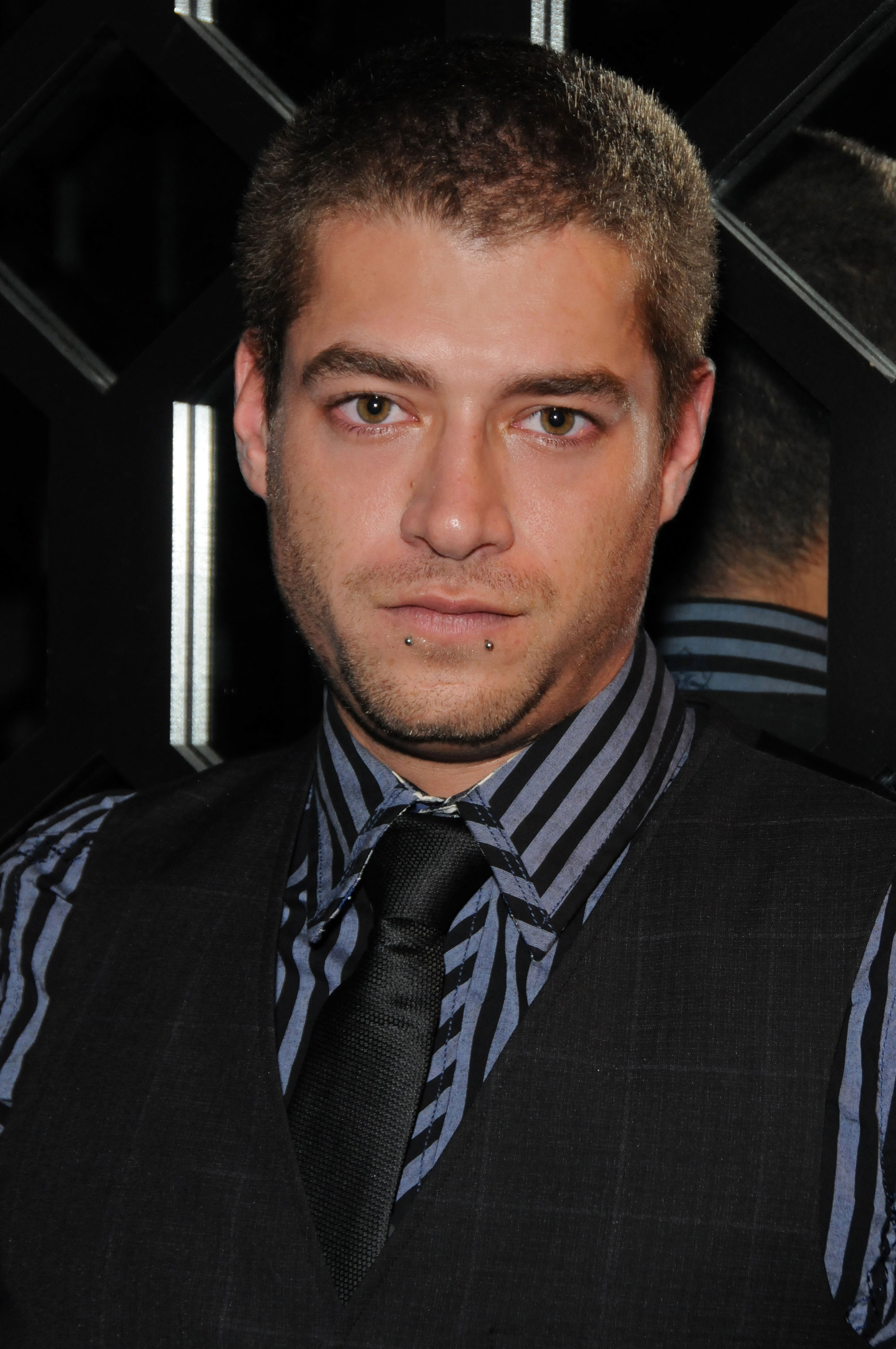
Xander Corvus, Best Actor winner

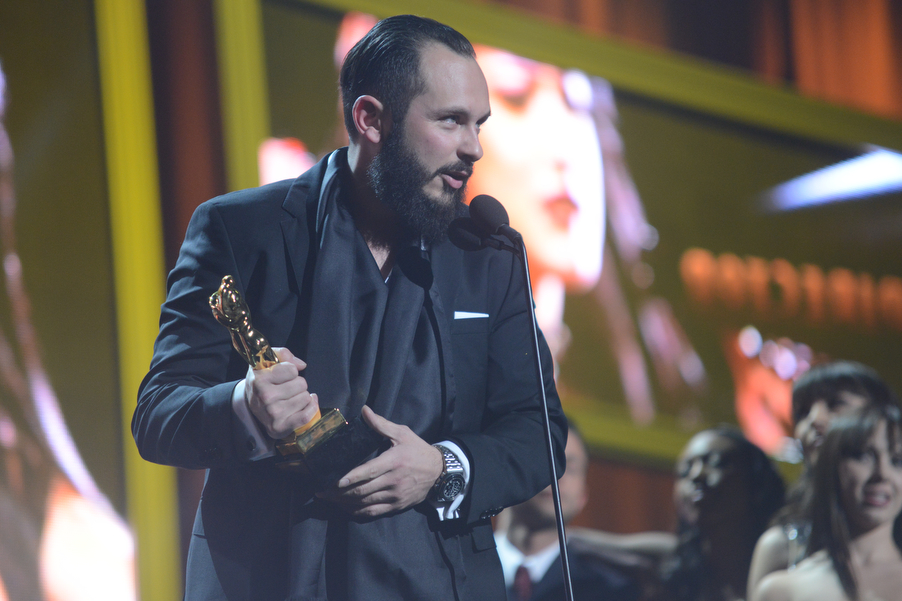
Greg Lansky, Director of the Year winner

Winners of categories announced during the awards ceremony January 21, 2017, are highlighted in boldface, and indicated with a double dagger (‡).

Movie of the Year	Female Performer of the Year
**Suicide Squad XXX: An Axel Braun Parody**‡; Rather than nominees for this category, contenders are chosen from the winners in the "Best Release" categories such as Best Anthology Movie, Best Drama, Best Parody Release and several others. Voting is conducted separately just prior to the awards ceremony.	**Adriana Chechik**‡; Anikka Albrite; August Ames; A.J. Applegate; Vicki Chase; Abella Danger; Aidra Fox; Keisha Grey; Chanell Heart; Katrina Jade; Jillian Janson; Sara Luvv; Megan Rain; Riley Reid; Verónica Rodríguez
Male Performer of the Year	Best New Starlet
**Mick Blue**‡; Xander Corvus; James Deen; Ryan Driller; Markus Dupree; Manuel Ferrara; Small Hands; Keiran Lee; Mandingo; Derrick Pierce; Tommy Pistol; Toni Ribas; Lexington Steele; Chris Strokes; Prince Yahshua	**Holly Hendrix**; Kimmy Granger; Alex Grey; Elsa Jean; Jojo Kiss; Katy Kiss; Lyra Law; Melissa Moore; Kira Noir; Anya Olsen; Gia Paige; Piper Perri; Adria Rae; Lana Rhoades; Gina Valentina
Transsexual Performer of the Year	All-Girl Performer of the Year
**Aubrey Kate**‡; Michelle Austin; Aspen Brooks; Jessy Dubai; Jessica Fox; Foxxy; Nina Lawless; Kelli Lox; Venus Lux; Chelsea Marie; Sunshyne Monroe; Chelsea Poe; Domino Presley; Isabella Sorrenti; Stefani Special	**Jenna Sativa**‡; Aiden Ashley; Lily Cade; Jayden Cole; Darcie Dolce; Val Dodds; Prinzzess Felicity Jade; Shyla Jennings; Jelena Jensen; Ryan Ryans; Celeste Star; Tanya Tate; Vanessa Veracruz
Best Actor	Best Actress
**Xander Corvus, The Preacher's Daughter**‡; Richie Calhoun, The Submission of Emma Marx: Exposed; Danny D, Sherlock: A XXX Parody; Ryan Driller, True Detective: A XXX Parody; Steve Holmes, The One I Lust; Marcus London, Devil Inside; Ryan McLane, Win a Date With Sophia Blake; Tyler Nixon, This Ain't Fallout XXX; Tommy Pistol, Suicide Squad XXX: An Axel Braun Parody; Ryan Ryder, Storm of Kings: XXX Parody; Steven St. Croix, Color Blind; Evan Stone, The Donald; Nacho Vidal, Outland: Beyond the Far West; Chad White, The Marine; Aaron Wilcoxxx, Fragment of Love	**Kleio Valentien, Suicide Squad XXX: An Axel Braun Parody**‡; Asa Akira, The J.O.B.; Aria Alexander, Sex Machina: A XXX Parody; Samantha Bentley, Hard in Love; Carter Cruise, Supergirl XXX: An Axel Braun Parody; Cherie DeVille, Project Pandora: A Psychosexual Lesbian Thriller; Jessica Drake, DNA; Karlee Grey, Student Bodies 5; Veruca James, Deception: A XXX Thriller; Cassidy Klein, Little Red: A Lesbian Fairy Tale; Sara Luvv, Babysitting the Baumgartners; Abigail Mac, True Detective: A XXX Parody; Penny Pax, The Submission of Emma Marx: Exposed; Dana Vespoli, Lefty; Kasey Warner, Color Blind
Director of the Year	Best Supporting Actress
**Greg Lansky**‡; Brad Armstrong; James Avalon; Axel Braun; Stormy Daniels; Manuel Ferrara; William H; Jules Jordan; Ryan Madison; Mason; Bree Mills & Stills by Alan; Jim Powers; B. Skow; Jacky St. James; Dana Vespoli	**Joanna Angel, Cindy Queen of Hell**‡; Britney Amber, The Donald; Julia Ann, Keep It in the Family; Mercedes Carrera, Project Pandora: A Psychosexual Lesbian Thriller; Adriana Chechik, Color Blind; Bree Daniels, Lefty; Alexis Fawx, The Preacher's Daughter; Holly Heart, The Young & the Rest of Us; Kendra James, Missing: A Lesbian Crime Story; Karla Kush, Forbidden Affairs 5: My Wife's Daughter; Angel Long, Hard in Love; Aaliyah Love, New Beginnings; Katie Morgan, Republican Candidate Wife Swap; April O’Neil, Ten Inch Mutant Ninja Turtles and Other Porn Parodies; Jessa Rhodes, Good Little Girl
Best Drama	Best Parody
**The Preacher's Daughter**‡; Anything He Desires; Color Blind; Dark Secrets; Devil Inside; Dirty Money; DNA; Forbidden Affairs 5: My Wife's Daughter; Fragment of Love; Last Chance; Lefty; The Marine; Red Light; Sugarbabies: A Cautionary Tale; The Young & the Rest of Us	**Suicide Squad XXX: An Axel Braun Parody**‡; Beauty and the Beast XXX: An Erotic Fairy Tale Parody; Ghostbusters XXX Parody; How the Grinch Gaped Christmas; Little Red: A Lesbian Fairy Tale; Not Traci Lords XXX: '80s Superstars Reborn; The One I Lust; Republican Candidate Wife Swap; Sex Machina: A XXX Parody; Storage Whore Orgy; Supergirl XXX: An Axel Braun Parody; Ten Inch Mutant Ninja Turtles and Other Porn Parodies; This Ain't American Horror Story XXX; This Ain't Fallout XXX'; True Detective: A XXX Parody
Best Star Showcase
**Abella**‡; Adriana Chechik: The Ultimate Slut; Aidra Fox Is Slutwoman; All Access: Jasmine Jae; Ashley Fires Is the Archangel; Brett Rossi Is Delicious; Deviant Devil: Gabi Paltrova; Holly Hendrix's Anal Experience; Jesse: Sex Machine 2; Mia; Mick Loves Anikka; Riley Reid: Overexposed; SeXXXploitation of Alix Lynx; The Sins Life; Verónica Rodríguez: Latina Squirt Goddess
Best Boy/Girl Sex Scene	Best Girl/Girl Sex Scene
**Kendra Sunderland, Mick Blue; Natural Beauties**‡; Janice Griffith, Small Hands; Ass Effect'; Katrina Jade, Prince Yahshua; Big Wet Interracial Tits; Anna de Ville, Ryan Madison; BoHo Beauties; Kimmy Granger, J-Mac; Don't Break Me; Lea Lexis, Ramón Nomar; Fucking Flexible; Sara Luvv, Mandingo; Her 1st Interracial; Lana Rhoades, Xander Corvus; Hot Models; Verónica Rodríguez, Xander Corvus; Love Her Madly; Anikka Albrite, Mick Blue (scene 1); Mick Loves Anikka; Aidra Fox, James Deen; Perfect Pussy; Chanel Preston, Damon Dice; Red Light; Carter Cruise, Charles Dera; Supergirl XXX: An Axel Braun Parody; Gina Valentina, Seth Gamble; Teen Sex Dolls 2; Alexis Adams, Manuel Ferrara; Young & Glamorous 8	**Riley Reid, Reena Sky; Missing: A Lesbian Crime Story**‡; Allie Haze, Peta Jensen; Anything He Desires; Kenna James, Kristen Scott; First Lesbian Summer; Rebel Lynn, Sara Luvv (scene 5); Fool for Love; Anya Olsen, Sandy Fantasy; Girlfiction; Kira Noir, Kelsi Monroe; Lesbian Beauties 16: Interracial; Gina Valentina, Verónica Rodríguez; Lesbian Border Crossings; Shyla Jennings, Elle Alexandra; The Lesbian Experience: An Unexpected Encounter; Cadence Lux, Amara Romani; Lesbian Fantasies; August Ames, Darcie Dolce; The Lesbian Landlord; Abigail Mac, Lilly Evans; Lesbian Tutors 2; Ariana Marie, Xandra Sixx; Let It Ride; Aspen Rae, Shae Snow; My Wicked Tongue; Jenna Sativa, Lyra Law; No Man's Land: Raunchy Roommates 2; Aidra Fox, Eva Lovia; We Live Together 43
Best Anal Sex Scene	Best Oral Sex Scene
**Megan Rain, Manuel Ferrara; Anal Models**‡; Abella Danger, Manuel Ferrara; Abella; Alex Grey, Mick Blue; Anal Beauty 3; Veruca James, Markus Dupree; Anal Domination; Veronica Avluv, James Deen; Anal Fanatic 7; Joanna Angel, Nacho Vidal; Anal Sex on the Beach; Ariana Marie, Mick Blue; The Art of Anal Sex 2; Adriana Chechik, Mick Blue; Gape Tryouts; Romi Rain, Keiran Lee; In the Ass at Last; Riley Reid, Joss Lescaf; Interracial & Anal 3; Kristina Rose, Mick Blue; Latin Asses 2; Marley Brinx, Chris Strokes; Marley Brinx Pushes the Temperature Up to Sizzling; Casey Calvert, Toni Ribas; Oil & Anal 2; Vicki Chase, Mick Blue; Performers of the Year 2016; Jillian Janson, Mick Blue; Top Models	**Adriana Chechik; Adriana Chechik: The Ultimate Slut**‡; Dakota, #My Face 2; Aria Alexander, Aria Alexander Swallows Every Last Drop; Asa Akira, Asa Goes to Hell; Brett Rossi, Brett Rossi Is Delicious; Skin Diamond, Teanna Trump; Deep Throat League 2; Morgan Lee, Facialized 3; Marsha May, Feeding Frenzy 12; Kristina Rose, Gag Reflex 2; Chanel Preston, Massive Facials 7; Blair Williams, Mouth Magic; Verónica Rodríguez, Riley Reid; Slobber River BJs; Riley Steele, Supergirl XXX: An Axel Braun Parody; Jillian Janson, Casey Calvert, Aidra Fox; Throat Training 2; Samantha Rone, Wet Food 7
Fan Award: Favorite Female Porn Star	Fan Award: Favorite Cam Girl
**Riley Reid**‡; A.J. Applegate, Abella Danger, Abigail Mac, Adriana Chechik, Aidra Fox, Alexis Texas, Allie Haze, Ana Foxxx, Angela White, Anikka Albrite, Aria Alexander, Ariana Marie, Asa Akira, August Ames, Brett Rossi, Carter Cruise, Casey Calvert, Chanell Heart, Chloe Amour, Dani Daniels, Eva Lovia, Goldie Rush, Janice Griffith, Jenna Sativa, Jessa Rhodes, Jesse, Jessica Drake, Jillian Janson, Karlee Grey, Kasey Warner, Kat Dior, Katrina Jade, Keisha Grey, Kissa Sins, Kleio Valentien, Layla Sin, Luna Star, Megan Rain, Mia Malkova, Misty Stone, Morgan Lee, Nicole Aniston, Nikki Benz, Penny Pax, Peta Jensen, Riley Steele, Romi Rain, Sara Luvv, Shyla Jennings, Verónica Rodríguez, Vicki Chase.	**Kati3kat**‡; 0bedientSlut, AAPL_, AbrilRocks, adysweet, AllexyaHot, AlysaJolie, AngelKiuty, Arquelina, Aruba Jasmine, Ashe Maree, AsianPlaymateXX, Aspen Rae, Aubrilee, BabyJas, BlondMelanye, Brielle Day, CarminaHot1, Caylin, Cherry Devivre, ChristyOnCam, Chroniclove, DaisyDestin, Dawn Willow, Devious Angel, Emily Grey, Eva Gomez, Eva Sin, Ginger Banks, Goddess Valora, Harli Lotts, Hazina, HopeDaylee, Jalyn, Jenny Blighe, Jisel Lynn, JordanLane, KaliiiRose_, Kickaz, LeightonBrook, LenaSpanks, Lexie Ford, LindseyBanks, LittleRedBunny, Livia Choice, LovelyKittie, MalibuBomb, Mariah Leonne, Melody Kush, MissAshe, MissChristmas, Mitsuko Doll, Natalie Star, OneGreatDiva, Paulina, PavlovsWhore, Pocket, Poppynaked, Rapture, Raquelle Diva, Rebecca000, Sabrina Nellie, saracross, Sassha Red, SeductiveGoddess1, ShandaFay, Spanishstar, Stefanie Joy, SugarBooty, UrCuteSarah, Valentina_Arango, Vicalouqua74, VivianisHere.

=== Additional award winners ===
The following is the list of remaining award categories, which were presented apart from the actual awards ceremony.

**CONTENT CATEGORIES**

- BBW Performer of the Year: Angel DeLuca
- Best All-Girl Group Sex Scene: Serena Blair, Celeste Star & Alix Lynx, AI: Artificial Intelligence
- Best All-Girl Movie: Missing: A Lesbian Crime Story
- Best All-Girl Series: Women Seeking Women
- Best Amateur/Pro-Am Movie: Amateur POV Auditions 26
- Best Amateur/Pro-Am Series: Amateur Introductions
- Best Anal Movie: The Art of Anal Sex 3
- Best Anal Series: Anal Beauty
- Best Anthology Movie: Natural Beauties
- Best Art Direction: Suicide Squad XXX: An Axel Braun Parody
- Best BDSM Movie: Deception: A XXX Thriller
- Best Big Butt Movie: Anikka vs. Kelsi
- Best Big Bust Movie: Big Wet Breasts 3
- Best Cinematography: Eddie Powell, The Submission of Emma Marx: Exposed
- Best Comedy: Cindy Queen of Hell
- Best Continuing Series: Angela Loves ...
- Best Director - Feature: Jacky St. James, The Submission of Emma Marx: Exposed
- Best Director – Foreign Feature: John Stagliano, Hard in Love
- Best Director – Foreign Non-Feature: Nacho Vidal, Nacho Loves Nekane
- Best Director – Non-Feature: Greg Lansky, Natural Beauties
- Best Director – Parody: Axel Braun, Suicide Squad XXX: An Axel Braun Parody
- Best Double Penetration Sex Scene: Abella Danger, Mick Blue, Markus Dupree, Abella
- Best Editing: Eddie Powell, The Submission of Emma Marx: Exposed
- Best Ethnic/Interracial Series: Black & White
- Best Ethnic Movie: Asian Fuck Machines
- Best Foreign Feature: Sherlock: A XXX Parody
- Best Foreign Non-Feature: Rocco's Italian Porn Boot Camp 2
- Best Foreign Series: Rocco One on One
- Best Gonzo Movie: Angela Loves Gonzo
- Best Group Sex Scene: Jojo Kiss, Katrina Jade, Casey Calvert, Goldie Rush, Keisha Grey, Prince Yahshua, Lexington Steele, Rico Strong; Orgy Masters 8
- Best Ingénue Movie: Fresh Girls 3
- Best Interracial Movie: My First Interracial 7
- Best Makeup: Cammy Ellis, May Kup, Suicide Squad XXX: An Axel Braun Parody
- Best Marketing Campaign – Company Image: Blacked/Tushy/Vixen
- Best Marketing Campaign – Individual Project: No on Prop 60, Julia Ann
- Best MILF Movie: Dirty Rotten Mother Fuckers 10
- Best New Imprint: Vixen
- Best New Series: Her 1st Interracial
- Best Non-Sex Performance: Nyomi Banxxx, Suicide Squad XXX: An Axel Braun Parody
- Best Older Woman/Younger Girl Movie: Mother-Daughter Exchange Club 44
- Best Oral Movie: Facialized 3
- Best Orgy/Gangbang Movie: Gangbanged 7
- Best Polyamory Movie: Babysitting the Baumgartners
- Best Screenplay: Jacky St. James, The Submission of Emma Marx: Exposed
- Best Screenplay – Parody: Axel Braun, Suicide Squad XXX: An Axel Braun Parody
- Best Sex Scene in a Foreign-Shot Production: Misha Cross, Nikita Bellucci, Hard in Love
- Best Solo/Tease Performance: Asa Akira, Asa Goes to Hell
- Best Soundtrack: The Submission of Emma Marx: Exposed
- Best Special Effects: Supergirl XXX: An Axel Braun Parody
- Best Specialty Movie – Other Genre: Marshmallow Girls 4
- Best Specialty Series – Other Genre: Schoolgirl Bound
- Best Supporting Actor: Brad Armstrong, The Preacher's Daughter
- Best Taboo Relations Movie: Tabu Tales: Me, My Brother and Another

**Content (ctd.)**

- Best Three-Way Sex Scene – Boy/Boy/Girl: Kleio Valentien, Tommy Pistol, Charles Dera, Suicide Squad XXX: An Axel Braun Parody
- Best Three-Way Sex Scene – Girl/Girl/Boy: Alex Grey, Karla Kush, Christian Clay, Anal Beauty 4
- Best Transsexual Movie: Real Fucking Girls
- Best Transsexual Series: Trans-Visions
- Best Transsexual Sex Scene: Buck Angel, Valentina Nappi, Girl/Boy 2
- Best Virtual Reality Sex Scene: Joanna Angel, Abella Danger, Manuel Ferrara, Angel 'n Danger
- Clever Title of the Year: Aunts in My Pants
- Female Foreign Performer of the Year: Misha Cross
- Mainstream Star of the Year: Julia Ann
- Male Foreign Performer of the Year: Danny D.
- MILF Performer of the Year: Kendra Lust
- Most Outrageous Sex Scene: Holly Hendrix's Anal Experience, Jonni Darkko/Evil Angel; Holly Hendrix, Adriana Chechik & Markus Dupree in “Creamy Bottom Fun Ball Happy Time”

**WEB & TECHNOLOGY**

- Best Affiliate Program: Famedollars.com
- Best Alternative Website: Kink.com
- Best Dating Website: Flirt.com
- Best Membership Website: Tushy.com
- Best Porn Star Website: TashaReign.com
- Best Solo Girl Website: Bryci.com
- Best Virtual Reality Innovation/Site: HoloGirlsVR.com
- Best Web Director: Glenn King

**PLEASURE PRODUCTS**

- Best Condom Manufacturer: Trojan
- Best Enhancement Manufacturer: MD Science Labs
- Best Fetish Manufacturer: Stockroom
- Best Lingerie or Apparel Manufacturer: Fantasy Lingerie
- Best Lubricant Manufacturer: System JO
- Best Pleasure Product Manufacturer – Large: NS Novelties
- Best Pleasure Product Manufacturer – Medium: Jopen
- Best Pleasure Product Manufacturer – Small: Berman Innovations/POP Dildo

**RETAIL & DISTRIBUTION**

- Best Boutique: Cupid's Closet (Westchester, CA)
- Best Retail Chain – Large: Lion's Den
- Best Retail Chain – Medium: Ambiance, The Store for Lovers
- Best Retail Chain – Small: Babeland
- Best Web Retail Store: AdultEmpire.com

**FAN AWARDS**

- Favorite Cam Guy: AdamSinner
- Favorite Camming Couple: CookinBaconNaked
- Favorite Male Porn Star: Johnny Sins
- Favorite Trans Cam Star: Aubrey Kate
- Favorite Trans Porn Star: Aubrey Kate
- Hottest MILF: Kendra Lust
- Hottest Newcomer: Lana Rhoades
- Most Amazing Sex Toy: Angela White Fleshlight
- Most Epic Ass: Alexis Texas
- Most Spectacular Boobs: August Ames
- Social Media Star: Riley Reid
- Web Queen: Kissa Sins

=== Multiple nominations and awards ===
Suicide Squad XXX: An Axel Braun Parody won the most awards with nine, followed by The Submission of Emma Marx: Exposed with five. Other multiple award-winning movies were Natural Beauties and The Preacher's Daughter win three apiece and Abella, Cindy Queen of Hell, Hard in Love and Missing: A Lesbian Crime Story with two each. As well, Anal Beauty 4 and Angela Loves Gonzo both won an individual award in addition to being part of best series awards.

== AVN Honorary Awards ==
=== Hall of Fame ===
AVN on December 28, 2016, announced the 2017 inductees into its hall of fame, with the Pleasure Products Branch honorees announced the following day:

- Video Branch: Monique Alexander, Mick Blue, Stuart Canterbury, Cassidey, Rinse Dream, Kelly Holland, Steve Holmes, Sara Jay, Tory Lane, Mandingo, Daisy Marie, Aurora Snow, Charmane Star, Mark Stone, Christian XXX.
- Executive Branch: Joe Dambrosio, Danny Gorman, Jeff Steward, Gabor Szabo (aka Gabor Esterhazy).
- Internet Founders Branch: Gyorgy Gattyan, Michael Reul, Jim McBride.
- Pleasure Products Branch: Chuck Harnish, Jim Horne, Big Al Bedrosian, Dell Williams.

== Presenters and performers ==
AVN announced the 2017 AVN Awards Trophy Girls would be Uma Jolie and Gina Valentina.

== Ceremony information ==
AVN added two new categories to the 2017 awards show, to recognize the emerging virtual reality genre: Best Virtual Reality Sex Scene and Best Virtual Reality Innovation, the latter honoring "the most significant technological advance in the production or presentation of VR entertainment."
