= Marco Banderas =

Uruguayan-Spanish pornographic actor (born 1967)

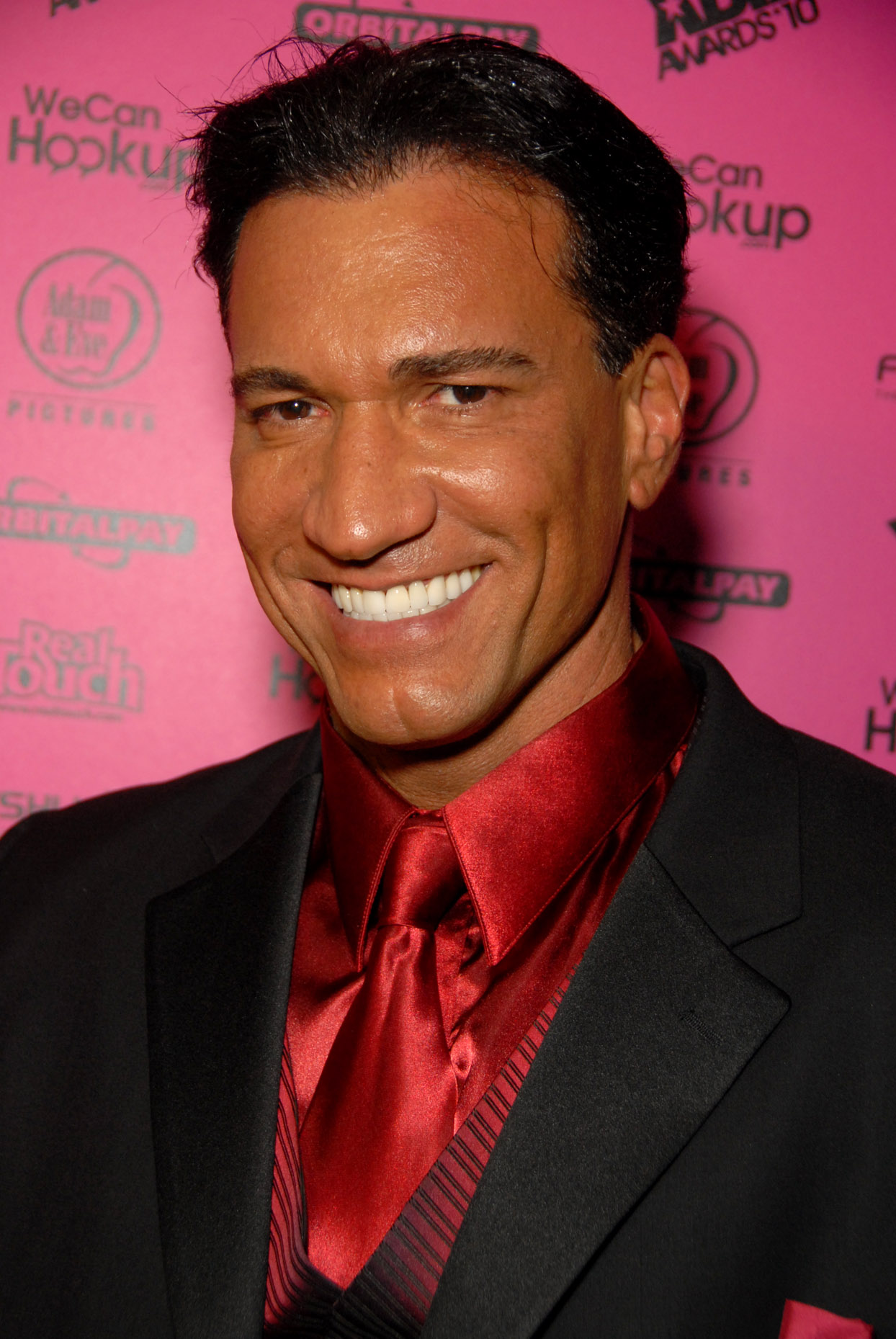
- Banderas attending the XBIZ Awards at Avalon, Hollywood, California, February 2010
- Born: 13 February 1967 (age 59); Montevideo, Uruguay
- Other names: Michael Duarte, Marco Banderos, Marco Duarte, Marco Duato, Marcos Banderas, Marco
- Height: 6 ft 2 in (1.88 m)
- Spouse: Briana Bounce (m. 2016)

Edgard Fabián Etchenique Picardo (born 13 February 1967), known professionally as Marco Banderas, is a Spanish pornographic actor of Uruguayan origin.

== Early life ==
Banderas was born in Uruguay and raised in Barcelona. He speaks Spanish, Portuguese, Italian and Catalan.

== Career ==
Banderas and his wife, Lisa DeMarco, worked at the Bagdad Sex Club for three years where they were approached by Nacho Vidal during the Barcelona International Erotic Film Festival. He entered the adult film industry in 2005 under the stage name Marco Duato. He became frustrated with the surname because it was often misspelled as "Duarte", so he changed it to "Banderas".

Banderas launched his own production company, Hot Zone Productions, in April 2007, signed a distribution deal with American Xcess in August, and released the company's first film, Marco Banderas’ Crazy Dreams, in September. In October 2013, he launched his own website, marcobanderas.xxx.

In January 2008, sex toy manufacturer Topco Sales unveiled a replica of Banderas' penis as part of their "Wildfire Celebrity Series".

In May 2012, Banderas signed a contract with Magnum Contenidos Multimedia (MCM) to produce Porn Valley Dream, a reality television series documenting his life.

== Personal life ==
Banderas married Fiona "Lisa" DeMarco on 1 September 2001 and eventually divorced. He has an "I Love Fiona" tattoo, DeMarco's real name. He then married Briana Bounce on 15 November 2016 in Moscow, Russia.

== Awards and nominations ==
Awards and nominations
Award	Won	Nominated
AVN Awards	1	40
Urban X Awards	1	0
Urban Spice Awards	1	0
XBIZ Awards	0	7
XRCO Awards	0	1
Totals	3	48

Year	Ceremony	Result	Award	Work
2005	AVN Award	Nominated	Best Threeway Sex Scene – Video (with Nadia Styles & Ben English)	Double Teamed
2006	AVN Award	Nominated	Male Foreign Performer of the Year	—N/a
2006	AVN Award	Nominated	Best Anal Sex Scene – Video (with Venus)	Ass Quake
2006	AVN Award	Nominated	Best Anal Sex Scene – Video (with Dillan Lauren)	Raw Desire
2006	AVN Award	Nominated	Best Group Sex Scene – Film (with Lisa Lee, Lucy Lee, Sky Love, Lisa Marie, Haley Paige, Tyla Winn, Jerry, Nick Manning, Steven St. Croix & Jean Valjean)	Scorpio Rising
2007	AVN Award	Nominated	Male Performer of the Year	—N/a
2007	AVN Award	Nominated	Best Anal Sex Scene – Film (with McKenzie Lee, Scott Nails & Ben English)	Jenna's Provocateur
2007	AVN Award	Nominated	Best Oral Sex Scene – Film (with McKenzie Lee, Scott Nails & Ben English)	Jenna's Provocateur
2007	AVN Award	Nominated	Best Group Sex Scene – Film (with McKenzie Lee, Scott Nails & Ben English)	Jenna's Provocateur
2007	AVN Award	Nominated	Best Sex Scene in a Foreign-Shot Production (with Dora Venter, Tony DeSergio, James, Olivier & Zoltan)	The Hacienda
2008	AVN Award	Nominated	Best Anal Sex Scene, Video (with Nina Hartley)	Nina Hartley's Guide to Porn Star Sex Secrets
2008	AVN Award	Nominated	Best Group Sex Scene, Video (with Bree Olson, Amy Ried & Sascha)	DreamGirlz
2008	AVN Award	Nominated	Best Group Sex Scene, Video (with Jesse Jane, Rebeca Linares & Brianna Love)	Naked Aces 2
2008	AVN Award	Nominated	Best Group Sex Scene, Video (with Kelly Wells, John Strong & Brian Surewood)	Naomi's Fuck Me
2008	AVN Award	Nominated	Best Threeway Sex Scene (with Missy Monroe & Lorelei Lee)	Top Guns 6
2008	AVN Award	Nominated	Best Videography (with Ethan Kane, Jimmy D, Axel Braun, Chris Hall & Dr. Philgood)	Broken
2008	AVN Award	Nominated	Male Performer of the Year	—N/a
2008	Urban Spice Award	Won	Best Two-Way Sex Scene (with Marie Luv)	Minority Rules
2008	XBIZ Award	Nominated	Male Performer of the Year	—N/a
2008	XRCO Award	Nominated	Unsung Swordsman	—N/a
2009	AVN Award	Nominated	Best Anal Sex Scene (with Rebeca Linares)	Fuck Me: Rebeca Linares
2009	AVN Award	Nominated	Best Anal Sex Scene (with Katsuni)	Katsuni Minx
2009	AVN Award	Nominated	Best Double Penetration Sex Scene (with Harmony Rose & Tony DeSergrio)	Fuck Me: Rebeca Linares
2009	AVN Award	Nominated	Best Double Penetration Sex Scene (with Jada Fire & Chris Charming)	Lex Steele XXX 10
2009	AVN Award	Nominated	Best Group Sex Scene (with Stoya, Gabriella Fox, Abbey Brooks, Shyla Stylez, Veronica Rayne, Brea Lynn, Charles Dera, Manuel Ferrara)	Pirates II: Stagnetti's Revenge
2009	AVN Award	Nominated	Best Threeway Sex Scene (with Loona Lux & Eric Price)	Superwhores 11
2009	AVN Award	Nominated	The Jenna Jameson Crossover Star of the Year	—N/a
2009	AVN Award	Nominated	Male Performer of the Year	—N/a
2009	XBIZ Award	Nominated	Male Performer of the Year	—N/a
2010	AVN Award	Nominated	Best Double Penetration Sex Scene (with Eva Angelina & Ben English)	Deviance
2010	AVN Award	Nominated	Best Threeway Sex Scene (with Jandi Lin & Anthony Rosano)	Asian Fucking Nation 3
2010	AVN Award	Nominated	Best Threeway Sex Scene (with Priya Rai & John West)	Tormented
2010	AVN Award	Nominated	Male Performer of the Year	—N/a
2010	XBIZ Award	Nominated	Male Performer of the Year	—N/a
2011	AVN Award	Nominated	Best Double Penetration Sex Scene (with Nikki Jayne & Jerry)	The Condemned
2011	AVN Award	Nominated	Best Double Penetration Sex Scene (with Aliz & Tony DeSergio)	Don't Make Me Beg 3
2011	AVN Award	Nominated	Best Double Penetration Sex Scene (with Mika Tan & Chris Charming)	The Perfect Secretary: Training Day
2011	Urban X Award	Won	Best Anal Sex Scene (with Nyomi Banxxx)	Dynamic Booty 5
2011	XBIZ Award	Nominated	Foreign Male Performer of the Year	—N/a
2012	AVN Award	Nominated	Best Double-Penetration Scene (with Amy Brooke & John Strong)	Alexis Texas: Nymphomaniac
2012	AVN Award	Nominated	Best Double-Penetration Scene (with Audrey Hollander & Otto Bauer)	This Isn't UFC: Ultimate Fucking Championship
2013	AVN Award	Nominated	Best Group Sex Scene (with Allie Haze, Evan Stone, Barry Scott & Jerry)	Allie Haze: True Sex
2013	AVN Award	Nominated	Best Group Sex Scene (with Chanel Preston, Alex Gonz, Billy Glide, Danny Wylde & Will Powers)	Chanel Preston: No Limits
2013	AVN Award	Nominated	Best Group Sex Scene (with Anissa Kate, Prince Yahshua & Tony DeSergio)	The Initiation of Anissa Kate
2013	AVN Award	Nominated	Most Outrageous Sex Scene (with Chyna, Anthony Hardwood, Cyrus King, Justin Magnum, Ralph Long, Sledge Hammer, T.J. Cummings & Tommy Pistol)	Chyna is Queen of the Ring
2013	XBIZ Award	Nominated	Best Actor – Feature Movie	The Four
2013	XBIZ Award	Nominated	Best Scene – Feature Movie (with Jennifer Dark)	The Four
2014	AVN Award	Won	Best Double-Penetration Sex Scene (with Skin Diamond & Prince Yahshua)	Skin
2014	AVN Award	Nominated	Best Group Sex Scene (with Sarah Shevon, Danny Wylde, Mark Anthony, Logan Pierce & Evan Stone)	Six in Me 2
2014	XBIZ Award	Nominated	Best Scene – Non-Feature Release (with Skin Diamond & Prince Yahshua)	Skin

== Songs ==
- [3:21] Dulce veneno
- [4:13] Volveras
- [3:19] The Porn Life
- [4:05] Sin Ti
