= Joshua Broome =

American pastor and former pornographic actor

- Broome at the 2011 AVN Awards
- Born: Joshua Luke Broome; Charlotte, North Carolina, U.S.
- Occupations: Pastor, Pornographic actor (formerly)
- Height: 188 cm (6 ft 2 in)
- Spouse: Hope Broome (m. 2016)
- Children: 4
- Website: www.joshuabroome.me

Joshua Luke Broome, formerly known as Rocco Reed, is an American pastor and former pornographic actor.

== Early life ==
Broome and his younger brother were raised by their mother, who was divorced from their father. When he was 15, he pursued modelling, and moved to Los Angeles as an adult in an attempt to become an actor. He was offered a job as an adult film star, and began doing shoots.

== Career ==
=== Pornography ===
Broome entered the pornography industry in 2006. In 2011, he began directing pornography for Penthouse Video.

Broome starred in more than 1,000 adult movies over 6 years before his retirement in 2013. He had done both gay and straight pornography, having been signed to Men.com for a 6-month period. He was nominated three times, including in 2011, for Best Male Performer for the AVN Awards, as well as 2012's Best Supporting Actor. He claims that he had earned over $1.1 million during his career.

=== Post-pornography ===
In 2013, becoming depressed from his lifestyle, Broome planned to die by suicide. Before going through with his plan, he drove to the bank and deposited a check, where he broke down in tears and called his mother. He moved to South Carolina where his mother lived, where he became a fitness trainer. He met his future wife, and started going to a Baptist Church with her. He became a Christian in 2015.

He studied Christian Ministry at Liberty University and graduated with a Bachelor of Arts in 2022.

=== Ministry ===
In 2022, he became a pastor at Good News Baptist Church in Cedar Rapids, Iowa.

He is currently a Christian minister and anti-pornography advocate. He hosts a Christian podcast, Counterfeit Culture.

== Personal life ==
Prior to leaving the adult film industry, he was engaged to fellow porn star Asa Akira.

He met his wife, Hope, in 2015, and they married in 2016. They currently have three sons.

== Awards and nominations ==
XBIZ Awards
Year	Nomination	Film	Result
2010	Male Performer of the Year		Nominated
2011	Best Male Performance of the Year		Nominated
2011	Best Male Actor of the	Mad Love	Nominated
2012	Best Performer of the Year		Won
2012	Best Acting Performance of the Year	Girlfriend for Hire	Nominated
2012	Best Acting Performance of the Year	Star Trek: The Next Generation: A XXX Parody	Nominated
2013	Best Double Performance	Cafe Amore	Nominated
2013	Best Supporting Actor	Star Wars XXX: A Porn Parody	Nominated
2013	Best Parody Scene	Star Wars XXX: A Porn Parody	Nominated

AVN Awards
Year	Nomination	Film	Result
2009	Best Male Newcomer		Nominated
2010	Best Group Sex Scene	2040	Nominated
2010	Male Performer of the Year		Nominated
2011	Male Performer of the Year		Nominated
2012	Best Group Sex Scene	The Rocki Whore Picture Show: A Hardcore Parody	Nominated
2012	Best Supporting Actor	Horizon	Nominated
2012	Best 3-Way	What the Fuck! Big Tits, Bitches & Ass	Nominated
2012	Male Performer of the Year		Nominated

XRCO Awards
Year	Nomination	Result
2010	Best Male Performance	Nominated
2012	Best Actor	Nominated
2012	Best Male Performance	Nominated
