= Lexington Steele =

American pornographic actor, director, producer, and former stockbroker

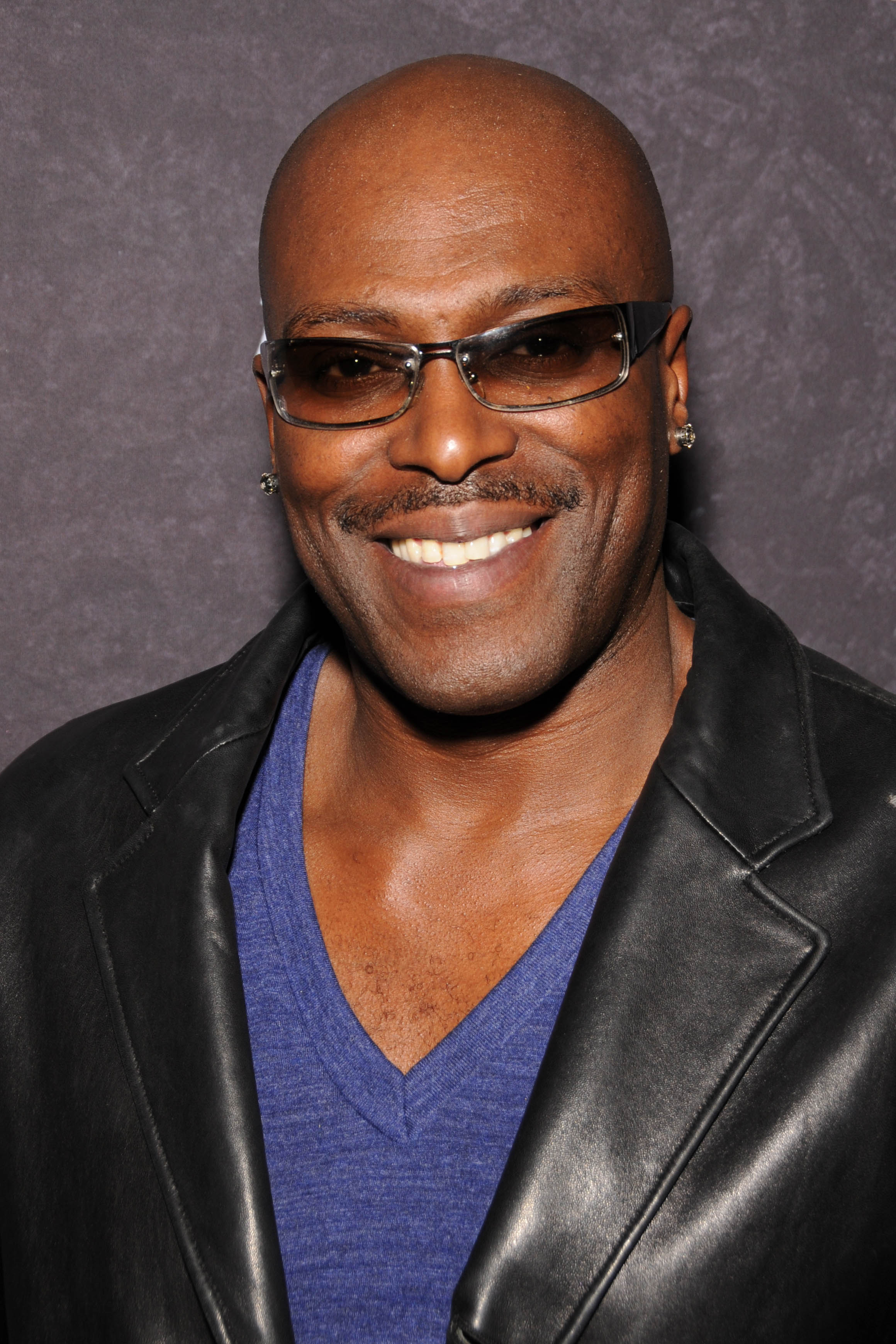
- Steele in 2014
- Born: Clifton Todd Britt; November 28, 1969 (age 56); Morristown, New Jersey, U.S.
- Other names: Lexington Steel, Black Bastard, Lex Steele, Lexington, Lexinton Steel, Lex, Hudson Smu doherty
- Education: Syracuse University
- Occupations: Pornographic actor; director; producer; former stockbroker
- Years active: 1994–present
- Height: 6 ft 2 in (1.88 m)
- Spouse: Savana Styles (divorced)
- Website: www.lexsteele.com

Clifton Todd Britt (born November 28, 1969), better known by his stage name Lexington Steele, is an American pornographic actor, director, producer, and former stockbroker. He is the owner of the adult production companies Mercenary Motion Pictures and Black Viking Pictures Inc.

In 2003, Steele became the first actor to receive the AVN Award for Male Performer of the Year three times. He has been inducted into the AVN and XRCO Halls of Fame. Steele has also made several mainstream appearances, including the film Crank: High Voltage (2009) and episodes of Weeds and Nip/Tuck.

== Early life ==
Steele was born and raised in Morristown, New Jersey. After graduating from Morristown High School, he attended Morehouse College in Atlanta, Georgia. After two years, he transferred to Syracuse University in New York. In 1993, Steele graduated from Syracuse's College of Arts and Sciences with Bachelor of Arts degrees in history and African American studies.

== Career ==
Steele started out in finance as a stockbroker trainee at a brokerage firm. After earning his Series 7 trading license, he transitioned to working for Oppenheimer Financial at the World Trade Center. Steele believes he would've been a victim of the September 11 attacks had he continued working as a stockbroker.

In a 2015 interview in AVN magazine, Steele commented about his transition into the adult industry, "Once I was licensed, it opened the door to a whole new recreational side of the industry. The guy who trained me invited me to a party in a hotel suite, and it ended up being a sex party like the ones in [the film] The Wolf of Wall Street. It wasn't long before a bigger director from Los Angeles gave me a job and suggested I attend the annual porn industry convention in Las Vegas" and with regard to his decision to switch careers and industries and in consideration for how lucrative securities trading can be, Steele stated, "I tell them it's not like I was already a master of the universe. I was working 12 to 14 hours six days a week. I made six figures, but my quality of life wasn't commensurate".

Steele has said that his stage name came about back during the days when he worked as a stockbroker when he took the subway to visit a client (at that time, he had already decided to move in the adult film industry and use the last name Steele), who was located in Midtown Manhattan and, Steele said, "I got off the subway at Madison [Avenue], [...] on the corner of Madison and Lexington Avenues" [sic], where he was struck by the sound of Lexington as a first name. Steele moved to Los Angeles and joined the industry full-time, initially shooting mainly for companies such as West Coast Productions and director Spunky, before appearing on videotapes produced by Anabolic and Diabolic. At the beginning of 2008, he joined Red Light District Video for a brief period. He appeared in about 1,300 videos in his pornographic career. He is known for his highly productive ejaculation capability and is popular on set.

=== Directing ===
Steele directs and performs exclusively for his own production company, Mercenary Motion Pictures (Headquarters in Encino, California), which he founded in 2009 and serves as chairman and CEO since 2009, with the company reporting annual net profits of $2.6 million in 2011. In 2013, he joined the Evil Angel roster of directors.

=== Mainstream appearances ===
Steele has worked as a model on the side and acted in minor TV roles. He appeared in two episodes of Showtime's Weeds in 2003 (3x07 "He taught me how to drive by" and 3x08 "The two Mrs. Scottsons") playing himself at a movie shoot filming a scene with Jessica Jaymes and Kirsten Price. He appeared in the 2009 feature film Crank: High Voltage and also appeared in an episode of the FX series Nip/Tuck (5x05 "Chaz Darling") as a male escort at a party.

== Personal life ==
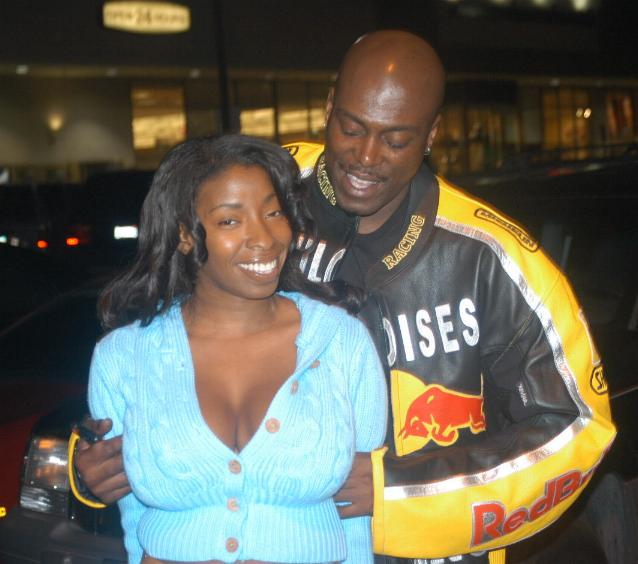
Steele and Blue in 2006

Steele dated for several years and was at one point engaged to adult film actress and director Vanessa Blue. The two appeared together on Playboy TV and in several movies. On June 20, 2006, Blue announced that she would be leaving Steele's production company Mercenary Pictures. In 2008, Steele and Blue filed federal lawsuits against each other over the ownership of numerous videos that were released under Mercenary. The suit was ultimately settled in March 2009 after the two met with an alternative dispute resolution jurist.

In October 2016, Steele and French Canadian actress Savana Styles launched Mercenary Enterprises, a division of Mercenary Pictures focusing on fetish-themed productions. In a 2017 interview with AVN, Steele revealed he had been married to Styles for a year.

In 2019, Steele underwent hip replacement surgery. During recovery, he experienced complications that required another operation. In November 2019, a crowdfunding campaign through GoFundMe was launched to help pay Steele's medical expenses.

== Politics ==
During his time studying African-American studies, Steele developed an awareness of American politics and African-American rights. In 2008, he expressed his support for Barack Obama's presidential campaign.

== Filmography ==
=== Film ===
Year	Title	Role	Notes	Ref.
1999	Private Dicks: Men Exposed	Himself	Television documentary	
2000	Last Breath	Gambler		
2004	Thinking XXX			
2009	Crank: High Voltage	Striking Actor	Credited as Lexington Steel	
2010	This Ain't Avatar XXX	Tsu'tey		
2017	Kuso	Jody	Horror anthology film	

=== Television ===
Year	Title	Role	Notes	Ref.
2003	Lex in the City	Host	Talk show	
2007	Meet the Faith	Himself	Episode: "The Sex Show (Sleeping with Stereotypes)"	
2007	Weeds	Himself	2 episodes	
2007	Baisden After Dark	Himself	1 episode	
2007	Nip/Tuck	Kid's Bedroom Swinger	Episode: "Chaz Darling"	
2016	Not Safe with Nikki Glaser	Himself	Episode: "I Miss David Bowie"	

== Awards and nominations ==
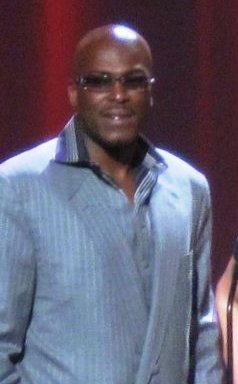
Steele at the 2010 AVN Awards

List of accolades received by Lexington Steele
Awards and nominations
Award	Won	Nominated
AVN Awards	10	33
NightMoves Awards	1	2
FOXE Awards	3	0
XRCO Awards	4	0
Venus Awards	2	0
Hot d'Or Awards	1	0
Urban X Awards	5	0
Urban Spice Awards	2	0
XBIZ Awards	0	11
Other awards	4	0
- Total number of wins and nominations
Totals	32	46

AVN Awards
Year	Nominated work	Category	Result	Ref.
2000	Lexington Steele	Male Performer of the Year	Won	
2001	West Side	Best Couples Sex Scene - Video	Won	
2002	Lexington Steele	Male Performer of the Year	Won	
2003	Babes in Pornland: Interracial Babes	Best Anal Sex Scene (Video)	Won	
2003	Lex the Impaler 2	Best Couples Sex Scene (Video)	Won	
2003	Balls Deep 5	Best Director - Non-Feature	Nominated	
2003	Lexington Steele	Male Performer of the Year	Won	
2004	Chasing the Big Ones 17	Best Sex Scene Coupling - Video	Nominated	
2004	Initiations 12	Best Three-Way Sex Scene - Video	Nominated	
2004	Lexington Steele	Male Performer of the Year	Nominated	
2005	Lex Steele XXX 3	Best Anal Sex Scene	Won	
2005	Invasion!	Best Couples Sex Scene (Video)	Nominated	
2006	Lex Steele XXX 5	Best Anal Sex Scene (Video)	Nominated	
2006	Lexington Steele	Male Performer of the Year	Nominated	
2008	Lexington Steele	The Jenna Jameson Crossover Star of the Year	Nominated	
2009	Lexington Steele	AVN Hall of Fame inductee	Won	
2009	Lex the Impaler 3	Best Couples Sex Scene	Nominated	
2009	Pole Position POV 8	Best POV Sex Scene	Nominated	
2009	Lexington Steele	The Jenna Jameson Crossover Star of the Year	Nominated	
2010	Breast Worship 2	Best Anal Sex Scene	Nominated	
2010	Lex the Impaler 4	Best Couples Sex Scene	Nominated	
2012	Lex the Impaler 6	Best Anal Sex Scene	Nominated	
2012	Lexington Steele	Male Performer of the Year	Nominated	
2013	Alexis Ford Darkside	Best Anal Sex Scene	Nominated	
2013	Massive Asses 6	Best Boy/Girl Sex Scene	Nominated	
2013	The Avengers XXX: A Porn Parody	Best Supporting Actor	Nominated	
2014	Double Black Penetration	Best Double Penetration Sex Scene	Nominated	
2014	Lex Turns Evil	Best Double Penetration Sex Scene	Nominated	
2014	Slutty & Sluttier 19	Best Double Penetration Sex Scene	Nominated	
2014	Lex Poles Little Holes	Best Three-Way Sex Scene - B/B/G	Nominated	
2014	Lexington Steele	Male Performer of the Year	Nominated	
2015	Allie	Best Anal Sex Scene	Nominated	
2015	The Lexecutioner 2	Best Anal Sex Scene	Nominated	
2015	Rump Raiders 5	Best Anal Sex Scene	Nominated	
2015	Nikki Benz Jungle Fever	Best Boy/Girl Sex Scene	Nominated	
2015	Lex's Point of View	Best POV Sex Scene	Won	
2015	Anal Boot Camp 2	Best Three-Way Sex Scene - G/G/B	Nominated	
2015	Lex the Impaler 8	Best Three-Way Sex Scene - G/G/B	Nominated	
2016	Angela 2	Best Double Penetration Sex Scene	Nominated	
2016	Lex's Point of View 3	Best POV Sex Scene	Nominated	
2016	Lex Is Up Her Ass	Best Three-Way Sex Scene - G/G/B	Nominated	
2016	Lexington Steele	Male Performer of the Year	Nominated	
2017	Orgy Masters 8	Best Group Sex Scene	Won	

XRCO Awards
Year	Nominated work	Category	Result	Ref.
2004	Up Your Ass 18	Best Threeway Sex Scene	Won	
2004	Lexington Steele	Male Performer of the Year	Won	
2005	XXX	Sex Scene (Couple)	Won	
2009	Lexington Steele	XRCO Hall of Fame inductee	Won	

AFW Awards
Year	Nominated work	Category	Result	Ref.
2004	Lex the Impaler 2	Best Sex Scene (Video)	Won	
2004	Up Your Ass 19	Best Anal Sex Scene (Video)	Won	
2004	Lexington Steele	American Male Performer of the Year	Won	

FOXE Awards
Year	Nominated work	Category	Result	Ref.
2005	Lexington Steele	Male Performer of the Year	Won	
2005	Lexington Steele	Favorite Male Performer	Won	
2005	Lexington Steele	Male Fan Favorite	Won	

Venus Awards
Year	Nominated work	Category	Result	Ref.
2005	Lexington Steele	Best Actor (USA)	Won	
2006	Lexington Steele	Best International Director	Won	

NightMoves Awards
Year	Nominated work	Category	Result	Ref.
2004	Lexington Steele	Best Actor (Fan's Choice)	Won	
2014	Lexington Steele	Best Male Performer	Nominated	
2015	Lexington Steele	Best Male Performer	Nominated	

Urban Spice Awards
Year	Nominated work	Category	Result	Ref.
2008	Lexington Steele	Crossover Male	Won	
2008	Lexington Steele	Urban Spice Award – Visionary	Won	

Hot d'Or Awards
Year	Nominated work	Category	Result	Ref.
2009	Lexington Steele	Best American Male Performer	Won	

Urban X Awards
Year	Nominated work	Category	Result	Ref.
2010	MILF Magnet 4	Best Couple Sex Scene	Won	
2010	Lexington Steele	Best Gonzo Director	Won	
2011	Lexington Steele	Director of the Year	Won	
2017	Lex'd	Best Couples Scene	Won	
2017	LexingtonSteele.com	Best Male Website	Won	

Inked Awards
Year	Nominated work	Category	Result	Ref.
2015	Lexington Steele	Male Performer of the Year	Won	

XBIZ Awards
Year	Nominated work	Category	Result	Ref.
2008	Lexington Steele	Male Performer of the Year	Nominated	
2010	Lexington Steele	Male Performer of the Year	Nominated	
2011	Lexington Steele	Male Performer of the Year	Nominated	
2012	Lexington Steele	Male Performer of the Year	Nominated	
2014	Samantha Saint is Completely Wicked	Best Scene - Vignette Release	Nominated	
2014	Lexington Steele	Male Performer of the Year	Nominated	
2015	Allie	Best Scene - Non-Feature Release	Nominated	
2015	Lexington Steele	Male Performer of the Year	Nominated	
2017	Suicide Squad XXX: An Axel Braun Parody	Best Actor - Parody Release	Nominated	
2018	Interracial Fiends	Interracial Release of the Year	Nominated	
2024	Lexington Steele: The Connoisseur 2	Best Sex Scene - Performer Showcase	Nominated	
