= Rodney Moore (actor) =

American pornographic actor

- Born: David Perry; May 9, 1950 (age 76); USA
- Other names: Rodney More, The King of Cream, Sammy Mancini
- Height: 6 ft 2 in (188 cm)
- Website: rodneymoore.com

Rodney Moore (born May 9, 1950) is an adult video performer, director, and producer.

He entered the business in 1991, shooting couples and amateurs and selling the tapes. He would eventually meet people within the industry and his career began to flourish. Moore was one of the early adopters of the gonzo/POV style of pornography which immersed the viewer in the experience. Moore focused on having humorous storylines to start off his scenes. He also became known for his larger than normal ejaculations and was nicknamed "the King of Cream" by Paul Fishbein, publisher of AVN (The Adult Video News). Adult video reviewer "Dirty Bob" christened the term "I Survived a Rodney Blast" for girls who had worked with Moore. Some of his early signature series were "Creme de la Face," "The Cumm Brothers," "I Swallow" and "Northwest Pecker Trek." In 2002, Moore began working with trans women using the alias Sammy Mancini. In 2012, Moore, under the name Mancini, was given the Lifetime Achievement Award at the 2012 Transgender Erotica Awards.

He is also a songwriter and musician, posting several musical videos on his YouTube channel performing original music and cover songs as his real name David Perry. He retired from shooting at the end of 2019 to focus fully on his music.

== Awards ==
- 2006 AVN Hall of Fame
- 2013 XRCO Hall of Fame
