= Christoph Clark =

French pornographic actor, producer and director

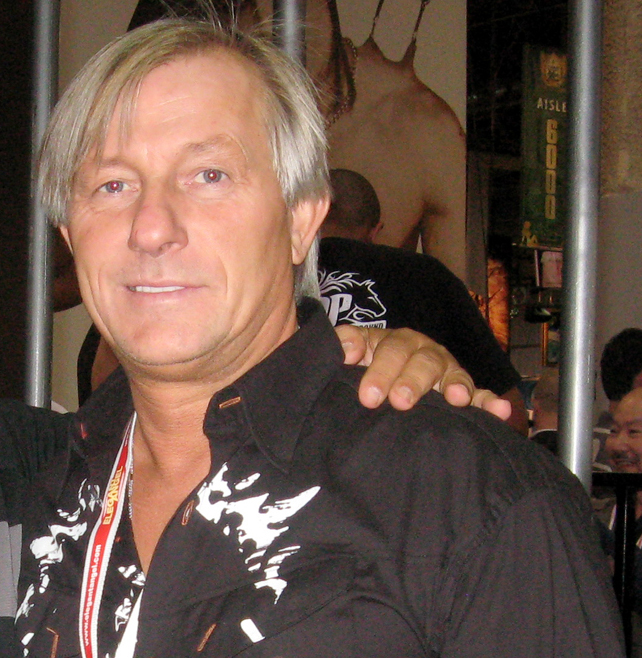
- Clark in 2008
- Born: 9 February 1958 (age 68); France
- Other names: Christophe Clark, Gilbert Grosso

Christoph Clark (born 9 February 1958) is a French pornographic actor, producer and director.

== Career ==
Called "perhaps the most popular male star in the French porn industry", Clark was born in France, but after working with figures including Marc Dorcel and Michel Renaud, he moved to Budapest in 1991, where he established his Euro Angel production company. Clark claims to be the first foreign producer to make a porn film in Hungary. He distributes his movies via John "Buttman" Stagliano's Evil Angel company. Stagliano financed Clark's anal sex-themed series "Euro Angels", which starred Hungarian actresses such as Rita Faltoyano, Cassandra Wilde, Laura Angel and Nikki Anderson among others.

Clark began directing for Evil Angel in 1997. His first film was Euro Angels, and he has since directed series including Beautiful Girls, Angel Perverse, Dressed To Fuck, Euro Angels, Euro Angels Hardball, Big Natural Tits, Nasty Intentions, Top Wet Girls, Euro Slit and Euro Domination, and one-off releases like Christoph Clark's Obsession and Swallow. Like the other Evil Angel directors, he owns the films he creates, whilst Evil handles the films' manufacture, distribution, promotion and sales, and takes a percentage of the gross sales. In the late 1990s he also directed for Private Media Group.

=== Style ===
Clark produces gonzo pornography, and typically interacts on-screen with his film crew and performers. His Hardball and Eurogirls series, which began in 1997, often feature sex on chairs, balconies or countertops, with bodies upside-down or in unusual positions. The success of his films has boosted the American popularity of other European producers.

== Awards ==
- 2002 AVN Hall of Fame inductee
- 2008 XRCO Hall of Fame inductee
- 2009 AVN Award – Best Director Foreign Non-Feature – Nasty Intentions 2
