= Prince Yahshua =

American pornographic film actor and director (born 1970)

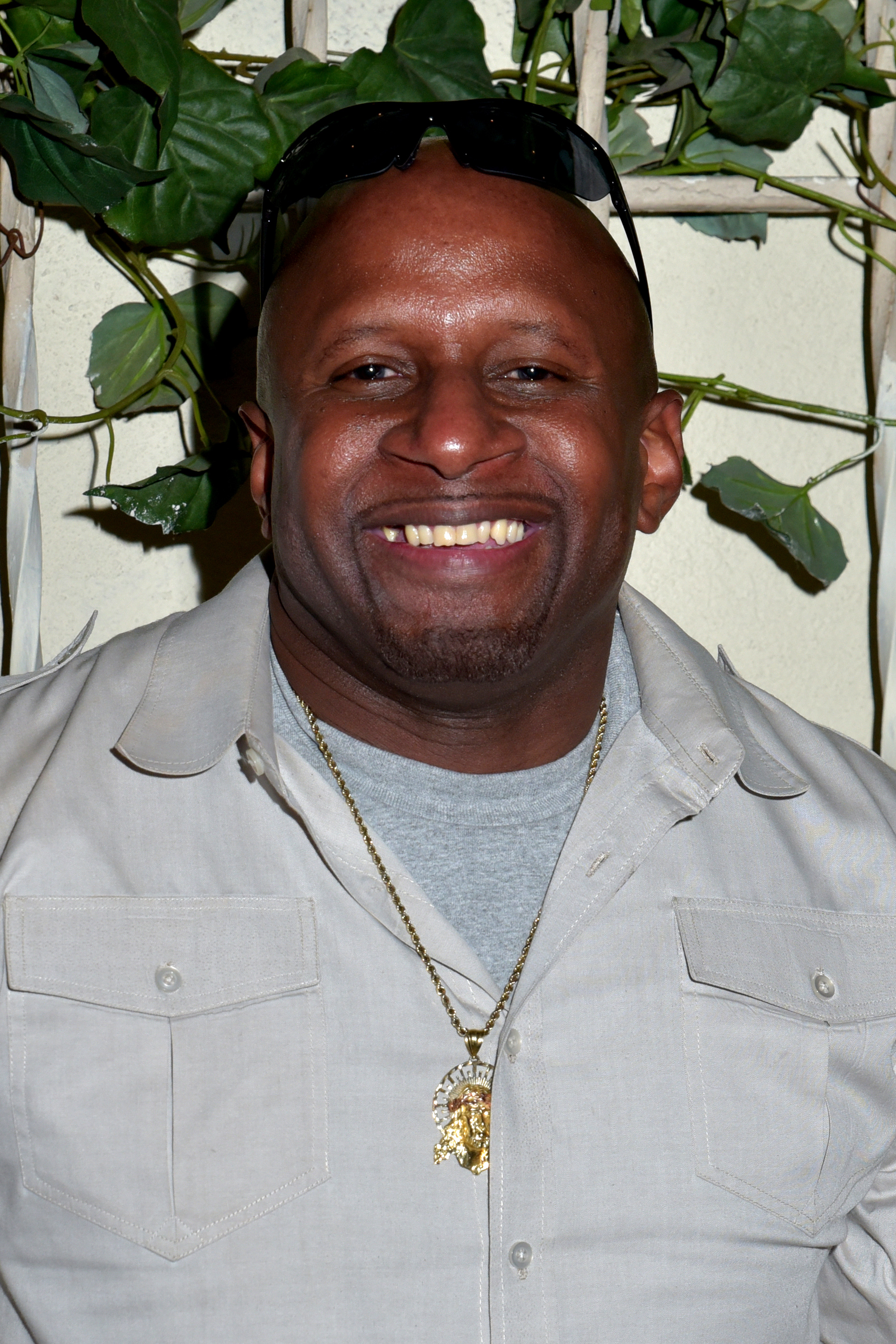
- Yahshua at the 2019 XRCO Awards
- Born: March 21, 1970 (age 56); Chicago, Illinois, U.S.
- Other names: Prince Yashua, Price Yeshua, Prince & Prince Yashia
- Height: 5 ft 11 in (1.80 m)
- Children: 2
- Website: princeyahshua.com onlyprince.com

Prince Yahshua (born March 21, 1970) is an American-French pornographic film actor and director.

== Career ==
Yahshua made his debut in the industry in 2004 around the age of 34. During his early work Yahshua first appeared with everyman features before undergoing a makeover, after which he shaved his head and built a 200 lb (91 kg) muscular physique. He also began wearing socks and Timberland work boots during his scenes, which became his trademark appearance. He also maintained the same stage name during the course of his career, despite variations in its spelling.

On August 23, 2010, Yahshua sustained a penile fracture during a shoot with Bethany Benz for West Coast Productions. He was rushed to Encino Hospital Medical Center and received an emergency operation, which lasted three and a half hours. He began physical therapy on September 10. It was initially diagnosed as a career-ending injury, but doctors later informed Yahshua that he would be able to resume working after sixty days. He received financial support from West Coast Productions during that time.

Yahshua signed with LA Direct Models in September 2011. He left the agency in July 2012 and began handling his own bookings. In April 2013, he signed with OC Modeling.

On August 20, 2013, Yahshua sustained another penile injury on set. Facing over $32,000 in medical costs, OC Modeling set up a fundraiser for him at GiveForward.com. He has since resumed performing in the industry.

== Awards ==
- 2009 Urban X Award – Best Couple Sex Scene (Black Assassin 3) with Kirra Lynne
- 2009 Urban X Award – Best Three-Way Sex Scene (Deep in Latin Cheeks) with Mya Nichole & Rico Strong
- 2010 Urban X Award – Male Performer of the Year
- 2010 Urban X Award – Best Group Sex Scene (Dynamic Booty 4) with Melrose Foxx, Emma Heart, Rico Strong & C.J. Wright
- 2011 AVN Award – Best Three-Way Sex Scene - G/B/B (Asa Akira Is Insatiable) with Asa Akira & Jon Jon
- 2011 Urban X Award – Male Performer of the Year
- 2012 Urban X Award – Male Performer of the Year
- 2012 Urban X Award – Best Anal Sex Scene (Prince The Penetrator) with Kagney Linn Karter
- 2012 XBIZ Award – Performer Comeback of the Year
- 2012 XRCO Award – Best Cumback
- 2014 AVN Award – Best Double-Penetration Sex Scene (Skin) with Skin Diamond & Marco Banderas
- 2017 AVN Award – Best Group Sex Scene
- 2019 AVN Award – Best Double Penetration Sex Scene
- 2019 XBIZ Award – Best Sex Scene - All-Sex Release (Joanna Angel Gangbang: As Above, So Below (with Joanna Angel, Ricky Johnson &Isiah Maxwell)
- 2020 AVN Award – Best Gangbang Scene
- 2020 XBIZ Award – Best Sex Scene - Vignette
- 2021 AVN Award – Best Three-Way Sex Scene - B/B/G
