= Anthony Crane =

American former pornographic actor

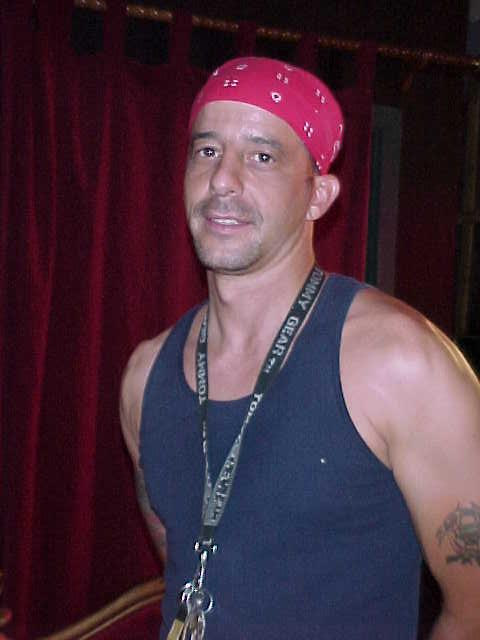
- Crane on the set of Naked Hollywood, June 20, 2001
- Born: March 28, 1963 (age 63); Hartford, Connecticut, U.S.
- Other names: Martin London & Tony Crane

Anthony Crane (born March 28, 1963) is an American former pornographic actor.

== Personal life ==
On April 19, 2002, Crane pleaded guilty to charges of being a felon in possession of a firearm and making terroristic threats against his ex-wife, Nicole London, and his ex-girlfriend, Jasmine Klein. He was sentenced to five years and four months in prison.

== Awards ==
- 2000 AVN Award – Best Non-Sex Performance – Double Feature!
- 2002 AVN Award – Best Actor (Film) – Beast
