= Mr. Marcus =

American pornographic actor (born 1970)

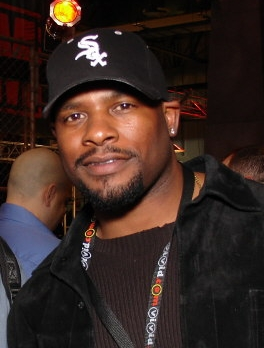
- Marcus in 2007
- Born: Jesse Anthony Spencer; September 4, 1970 (age 56); Pomona, California U.S.
- Other names: Mister Marcus, Mr. Marquis
- Agent: Elayne Rivers
- Height: 5 ft 8 in (1.73 m)

Mr. Marcus (born September 4, 1970) is the stage name of Jesse Anthony Spencer, an American pornographic film actor and director known for acting in or directing over 1,800 pornographic films.

In 2009, he was inducted into the AVN Awards Hall of Fame.

== Biography ==
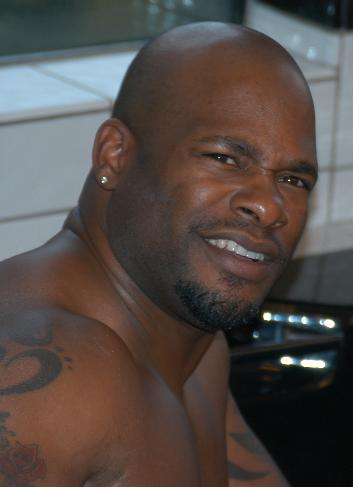
Marcus during shooting of film Black in White 2 in 2004

Marcus was born Jesse Spencer in Pomona, CA on September 4, 1970. Before becoming a pornographic actor, he worked as a truck driver. He started work in the pornography industry in 1994. He began his career as a director with the movie My Baby Got Back 7. He has been married since the early 1990s and has two children. He has been called the LL Cool J of porn.

== Syphilis outbreak ==
In August 2012, Marcus was the central person in an outbreak of syphilis among porn-performers leading to a hold on filming. The investigation revealed that Mr. Marcus was the first infected with syphilis and that he had provided incomplete information to the producers. Marcus first noticed evidence of the infection as a rash of brown spots on his hands. He attempted self-diagnosis by Internet searches and asking other people, with no success. He assumed it was due to stress or a vitamin deficiency and started taking vitamin supplements. On June 13, 2012, Marcus passed a medical test performed by Cutting Edge Testing because testing for syphilis was not standard at that time.

In May, a performer noticed marks on his penis and refused to work with him. Marcus believed this to just be a rough patch of skin or a reaction to a personal lubricant. On June 24, Marcus filmed a production for Bang Bros with noticeable white lesions on his penis. None of the other performers or production crew mentioned anything, and with the recent clean test, Marcus still believed it was due to vitamin deficiency. Marcus was first diagnosed with syphilis on July 12, 2012, by his personal doctor and received a shot of penicillin the next day. On July 14, 2012, Marcus went for another routine medical test with Talent Testing Services (TTS), which had added syphilis to its standard tests two weeks previously. This test was positive but was only a day after the injection. He waited the recommended 10 days from the initial test and was retested by TTS on July 21. The test was still positive but his doctor informed him that it was safe, he was not contagious and that his body would always show a base level reading for the infection.

Marcus returned to work on July 24, and due to his history and reputation in the industry he was not asked for the full test and just showed the producer a copy on his cellphone, enabling him to hide the rapid plasma reagin (RPR) section relevant to syphilis. For a different production, Marcus faked paper documentation by folding the page of the original to hide the RPR results and making a photocopy. This was noticed by Mark Blazing of Blazing Bucks on August 7, a week after filming. During this time Marcus had worked three times, although the female performers from these productions all subsequently tested negative. The outbreak had occurred before he was diagnosed and received the penicillin.

=== Jail sentence and civil suit ===
On June 4, 2013, Marcus was sentenced to 30 days in jail and 36-month probation for "knowingly exposing at least two co-stars to syphilis after testing positive for the disease days earlier" In June 2014 a $129,360 judgment was made in favor of Lylith LaVey, a costar who Marcus had exposed to syphilis.

== Awards ==
- 1998 XRCO Award - Male Performer of the Year
- 1999 AVN Award – Best Group Sex Scene, Film (The Masseuse 3)
- 2001 XRCO Award – Best Threeway Sex Scene (Up Your Ass 18)
- 2003 AVN Award – Best Supporting Actor, Film (Paradise Lost)
- 2006 XRCO Hall of Fame inductee
- 2009 AVN Hall of Fame inductee
- 2009 AVN Award – Best Couples Sex Scene (Cry Wolf)
- 2009 Urban X Award – Crossover Male
- 2009 Urban X Award – Male Performer of the Year
- 2010 AVN Award – Best Double Penetration Sex Scene (Bobbi Starr and Dana DeArmond's Insatiable Voyage)
