= Bellesa =

Pornographic company

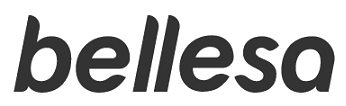
- Founded: February 2017 (9 years ago)
- Key people: Michelle Shnaidman (CEO)
- Industry: Sex
- Services: Pornography; Sex toys
- Subsidiaries: Bellesa Films; Bellesa Boutique
- Website: bellesa.co
- Advertising: Yes
- Registration: Optional
- Current status: Online

Bellesa is a Canadian internet pornography website founded in 2017 and marketed mainly towards women. It produces original pornographic films under the company Bellesa Films, with Jacky St. James as a director. Bellesa Boutique (BBoutique) offers sex toy products, and the website also features webcam models, pornographic fiction and other media. Under the name Bellesa Plus, they have a tiered subscription service.

The company was initially founded to host pornographic videos and other content shared by women, but after a positive profile in Bustle, it was widely criticized by sex workers for embedding content without consent from the production studios, directors or performers, and without paying them. Alongside an apology from CEO Michelle Shnaidman, the website underwent redesign. Bellesa later began working with St. James to produce films in which the pornographic actors had agency over storylines, outfits and who they would work with. They have a BIPOC Creators Program to give $20,000 per month to filming projects involving BIPOC workers. Additionally, the company produces sex toys with BuzzFeed, who promote the products on their website, and they sponsor BuzzFeed's Sex and Love section.

Bellesa Films have garnered several nominations for AVN Awards, winning one. A review of the website in The Daily Dot was mostly positive. The company's first sex toy, the Air Vibe, received mixed feedback from critics.

== History ==
=== Initial founding ===
The Montreal-based company Bellesa was founded in 2016 by Michelle Shnaidman and Jason Elman. Shnaidman has served as the sole director of the company since April 2016.

According to a sponsored article in The Bull & Bear, Shnaidman named the website after the Catalan word "beauty". She felt alienated by mainstream pornography websites, highlighting "grow your penis by 4 inches"-type adverts as a demonstration that the sites are not designed for her. Bellesa was targeted towards women. As a result of the company's research, Schnaidman said that the site was designed to highlight "authentic" performer pleasure and "relatable" bodies in pornography, with an increased focus on male bodies and noises. Additionally, Schnaidman saw women as more interested in erotica than men, due to the focus on empathy and imagination, and as consumers of both male-on-male and female-on-female porn—the latter was not referred to by Bellesa as "lesbian porn" to avoid alienating heterosexual women. Vice journalist Zing Tsjeng wrote in September 2017 that the website's official comments "leaned hard on the language of feminism and sex positivity".

The website began by hosting user-submitted videos, pornographic fiction and other media. It also hosted a blogging platform, The Collective, focused on sex-positivity as it relates to culture and feminism. An NowThis News video about the site drew attention to it. In September 2017, complaints by pornographic actors including Kim Cums, Janice Griffith and Casey Calvert about the illegitimacy of the website hosting videos without the performers' consent or financial benefit led Bellesa to remove its video and picture sections. According to Tsjeng, video clips were used without crediting the director or production company and appeared to be embedded from tube sites including Pornhub, SpankBang and xHamster. Mile High Media said that they had not given permission for their productions to be used on the website, but that it made up a substantial amount of Bellesa's hosted content. According to Schnaidman in September 2018, the pirated content was uploaded to tube sites and embedded on Bellesa by users; Bellesa did not have the facility to monitor uploads as its userbase grew. Schnaidman believed that host websites should have taken down the videos, but "bigger tube sites don't care whatsoever" about piracy.

The owner of Takedown Piracy, Nate Glass, said that the website was not hosting the content, instead "curating" the "predominantly pirated content". Glass sent at least 20 Digital Millennium Copyright Act (DMCA) takedown notices to Bellesa. Pornographic director Jacky St. James, whose content was used on Bellesa, criticized that the website was "faux-feminist" for making statements about ethics but using others' content without credit. According to The Daily Dot's Ana Valens, the website's terms and conditions held the users who uploaded material, not the owners, responsible for copyright issues. Jiz Lee, a producer for PinkLabel, commented that "piracy is the most destructive to independent creators, especially women filmmakers and female performers who produce their own content". Sociologist Chauntelle Tibbals wrote a piece for AVN that was strongly critical of both Bellesa and Suzannah Weiss's positive Bustle profile of Shnaidman; Tibbals said the profile was what brought scrutiny to the site.

Shnaidman apologized in a statement, saying: "it has become soberingly clear to me that the goal with which I created this platform has regrettably become in direct conflict with supporting and respecting the women of the sex-space". Brady Dale of The New York Observer commented that Bellesa's mission statement was solely about its audience, not sex workers, but that Shnaidman's apology "acknowledges that she also has a responsibility to the women producing this work".

=== Redesign and original productions ===
Bellesa.co underwent a website redesign in August 2019, and by March 2020 it had launched a sex toy shop, and a webcam model section. They formed contributing partnerships with Deeplush, Sweet Sinner and Vixen. Their tiered subscription plan scheme, Bellesa Plus, began in February 2021.

In October 2017, AVN announced that Bellesa was founding a pornographic studio, Bellesa Productions, in co-operation with Mile High Media. This manifested in April 2019 as Bellesa Films, with Jacky St. James as a director. It debuted with two box sets, First Times & Second Chances, and This Isn't Cheating, the first of which features Calvert and the latter of which features Carter Cruise. In 2020, Damon Dice was the first contract performer for Bellesa Films, with a year-long exclusivity contract.

In December 2019, Bellesa Films launched an imprint, Bellesa House, with St. James as a director. According to Bellesa, the productions give performers a chance to choose their partners; it features movies that are unscripted and unedited, where performers choose their own clothes and do not wear makeup or have their hair done. In addition, no sex stills are taken. The videos have no dialogue and are not softcore. Shooting for the imprint began at the end of January 2020.

Another original production series, Bellesa Blind Date, began in August 2021. Directed by St. James, two performers communicate with each other anonymously about their sexual fantasies, and then meet each other and have sex.

According to a 2023 study in Sexuality & Culture, videos on the site portray a narrow range of vulva appearances, with performers' labia minora rarely protruding past the labia majora. There was little difference to videos on Pornhub, according to the sample, except a lower rate of vulvas with no pubic hair. The authors concluded that Bellesa did not "deliver on pro-porn feminist ideals".

The BIPOC Creators Program, launched in February 2021, earmarks $20,000 per month to projects involving BIPOC workers. Bellesa stated that the initiative was needed because "much of the adult content shot by studios with performers of color, even in 2021, is fetishized and problematic".

In September 2022, Bellesa Plus released the comeback scene of performer Remy LaCroix.

==== Awards ====
UK Glamour named Bellesa one of the top ethical porn sites globally. In an interview with The Link, CEO Michelle Schnaidman said "I remember the first time I kind of just [told] my mom—I was merciless—I kind of just said, 'I'm doing feminist porn." Schnaidman works to de-stigmatize feminine sexuality for female identifying and non-binary people.

In 2021 Bellesa won AVN's Best New Production Banner.

=== Sex toys ===
In 2018, the company launched Bellesa Boutique, a sex toy shop. They began partnering with BuzzFeed. Their first original product, the AirVibe, was released in November 2020. It is a vibrator that uses suction and G-spot stimulation. The Pebble debuted in February 2021. The release dates were timed to arrive shortly before seasonal peaks in sex toy sales. In November 2021, Bellesa Boutique launched the Demi Wand sex toy with musician and actor Demi Lovato. The product is a wand vibrator that charges in its casing, designed mostly for clitoral stimulation. It was intended, like a love egg, to be accessible to people new to using sex toys. Bellesa also produces cock rings, dildos and other sex toys.

Bellesa sponsors BuzzFeed's Sex and Love vertical, while BuzzFeed receive royalties when its readers are pointed to a Bellesa product and complete a sale. The companies cannot spend money on Google or Facebook-owned platforms advertising, as their terms and conditions forbid this, but they can post on Facebook and Instagram. They use information collected from BuzzFeed readers to inform their consumer choices. Bellesa have also worked with The Daily Beast to promote its sex toys.

=== Other ventures ===
On August 19, 2021, the content creator platform OnlyFans—best-known for hosting pornography—announced that it would be prohibiting sexually explicit material from October onwards. The same day, Bellesa declared that it would be launching a similar platform for sex workers and content creators later in the year. Individual creators would monetize their content through subscription fees and one-time tips. OnlyFans reversed its decision a week later.

Bellesa are a sponsor of Rachel Kramer Bussel's Good Sex Awards, which had its first ceremony in July 2021.

The company has an active Instagram account, which was briefly suspended in December 2021, but restored after fan protest.

== Reception ==
At the 37th AVN Awards, for pornography in 2019, Bellesa Films garnered five nominations. In the following year, Bellesa House won the award for Best New Production Banner.

Danni Danger of The Daily Dot gave a mostly positive review of Bellesa in 2020, praising the "authentic, raw" nature of its original content, the high-profile nature of its pornographic performers and St. James's direction in maintaining "flirtatious tension". They praised the website's layout, its reasonable bandwidth, minimal adverts and affordability, but criticized that the films present womanhood as "thin, cis-gendered and able-bodied", and that some storylines are "cringeworthy", such as one in which a man is rewarded by the narrative for arguing with his girlfriend about her sexual boundaries in a threesome.

=== Sex toys ===
Mashable's Anna Iovine gave the AirVibe a mostly negative review, criticizing the buttons and design as confusing and writing that the size and shape of the toy did not match her anatomy. However, she praised its discreet packaging and price. In contrast, Anne Stagg, reviewing for New York, recommended the AirVibe for its price and ability to induce "glorious, toe-curling, blended orgasms".

Bustle's Sophie Saint Thomas and Cosmopolitan's Megan Wallace both praised the small size, quiet but powerful vibrations, case charger and ungendered yellow color. Thomas recommended it for traveling and for use on multiple erogenous zones during masturbation and sex. However, Wallace reviewed it as less aesthetically pleasing than some other sex toys, and noted that there is no option to reduce the intensity except by cycling through all eight modes.

Hayley Folk, writing in Elite Daily, praised the Bellesa Thrust's realistic simulation of penetrative sex, while noting its expensiveness and loudness. Allure also recommended the Bellesa Thrust, for incorporating community feedback, as well as the Bellesa FlutterWand, a vibrator that mimics a human tongue. An anonymous reviewer for New York recommended the Bellesa Aurora.
