= 33rd AVN Awards =

US adult industry award ceremony in 2016

- Date: January 23, 2016
- Site: The Joint; Hard Rock Hotel and Casino, Paradise, Nevada, USA
- Hosted by: Joanna Angel; Anikka Albrite; Kate Quigley
- Produced by: Gary Miller

Highlights
- Best Picture: Peter Pan XXX: An Axel Braun Parody
- Most awards: Being Riley, Batman v Superman XXX: An Axel Braun Parody (5)
- Most nominations: Peter Pan XXX: An Axel Braun Parody (21)

Television coverage
- Network: Showtime

The 33rd AVN Awards ceremony, presented by Adult Video News (AVN), honored the best pornographic movies and adult entertainment products of 2015 and took place on January 23, 2016, at The Joint in Hard Rock Hotel and Casino, Paradise, Nevada. During the ceremony, Adult Video News presented AVN Awards (often referred to as the Oscars of porn) in 115 categories released from October 1, 2014, to September 30, 2015. The ceremony, taped to be televised in the United States by Showtime, was produced by Gary Miller. Comedian and actress Kate Quigley co-hosted the show for the first time, joined by adult movie actresses Joanna Angel and Anikka Albrite.

== Winners and nominees ==
The nominees for the 33rd AVN Awards were announced on November 19, 2015, at the annual AVN Awards Nominations Party at Avalon nightclub in Hollywood.

Peter Pan XXX: An Axel Braun Parody received the most nominations with 21 total, with Batman v Superman XXX: An Axel Braun Parody came in second with 18. BLACKED.com received 15 nominations, and TUSHY.com was given 12.

The winners were announced during the awards ceremony on January 23, 2016. Despite their lower number of nominations, TUSHY.com were the big winners with Being Riley. Batman v Superman XXX: An Axel Braun Parody also shared the honors winning five trophies as well. Marriage 2.0, Peter Pan XXX: An Axel Braun Parody and The Submission of Emma Marx: Boundaries each won four awards and European production The Doctor took three.

=== Major awards ===
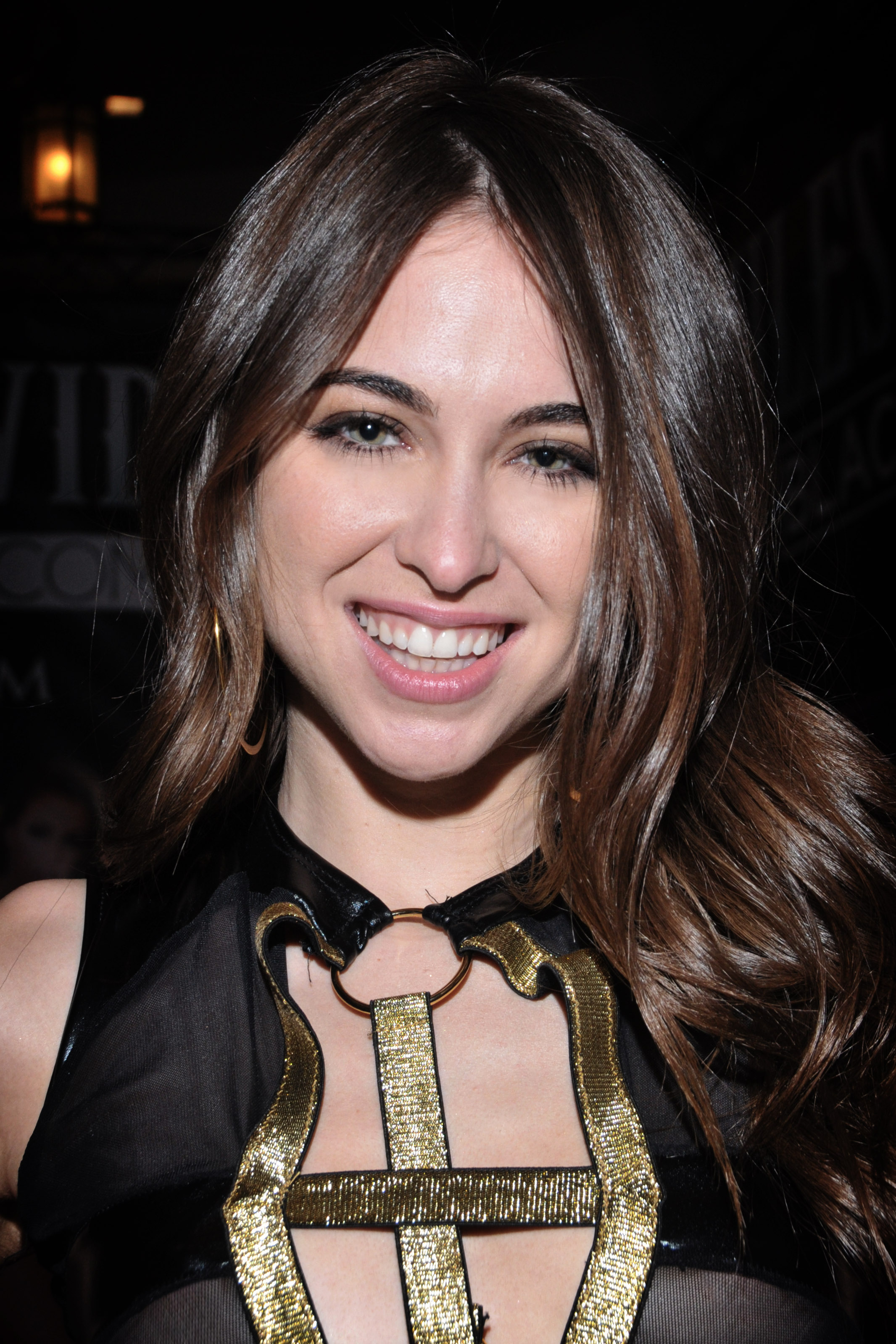
Riley Reid, winner of the 2016 AVN Female Performer of the Year Award

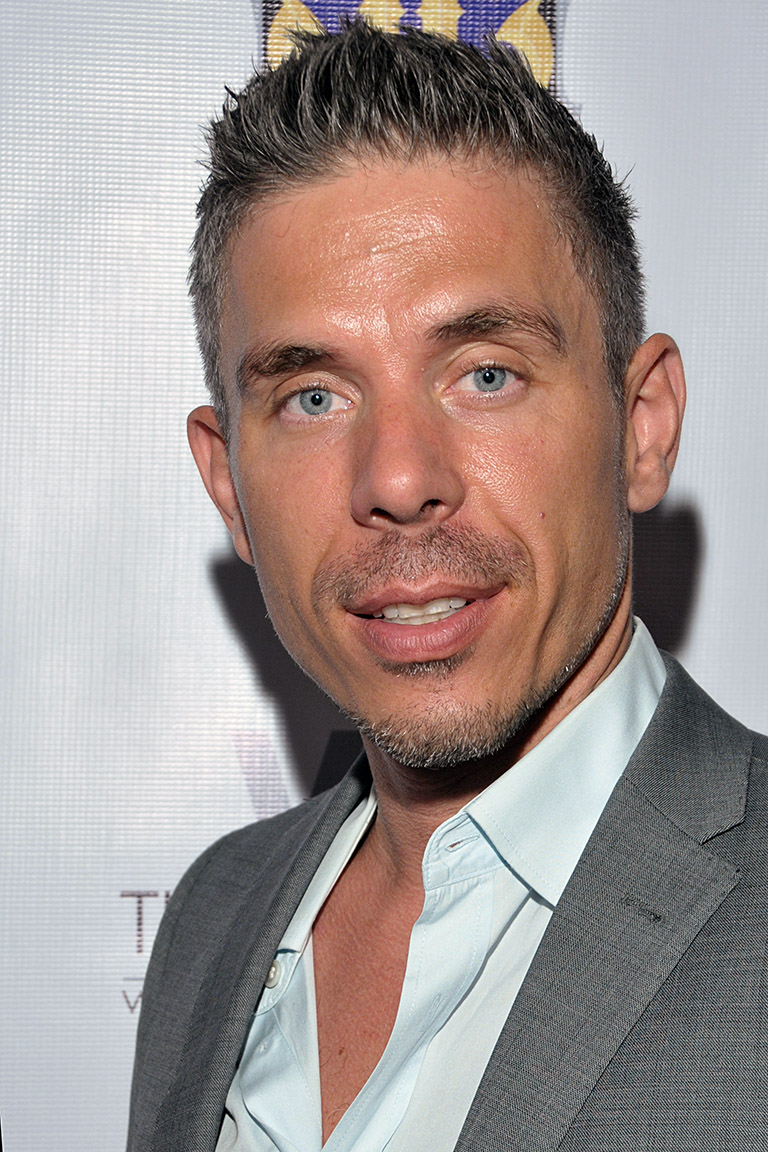
Mick Blue, Male Performer of the Year winner

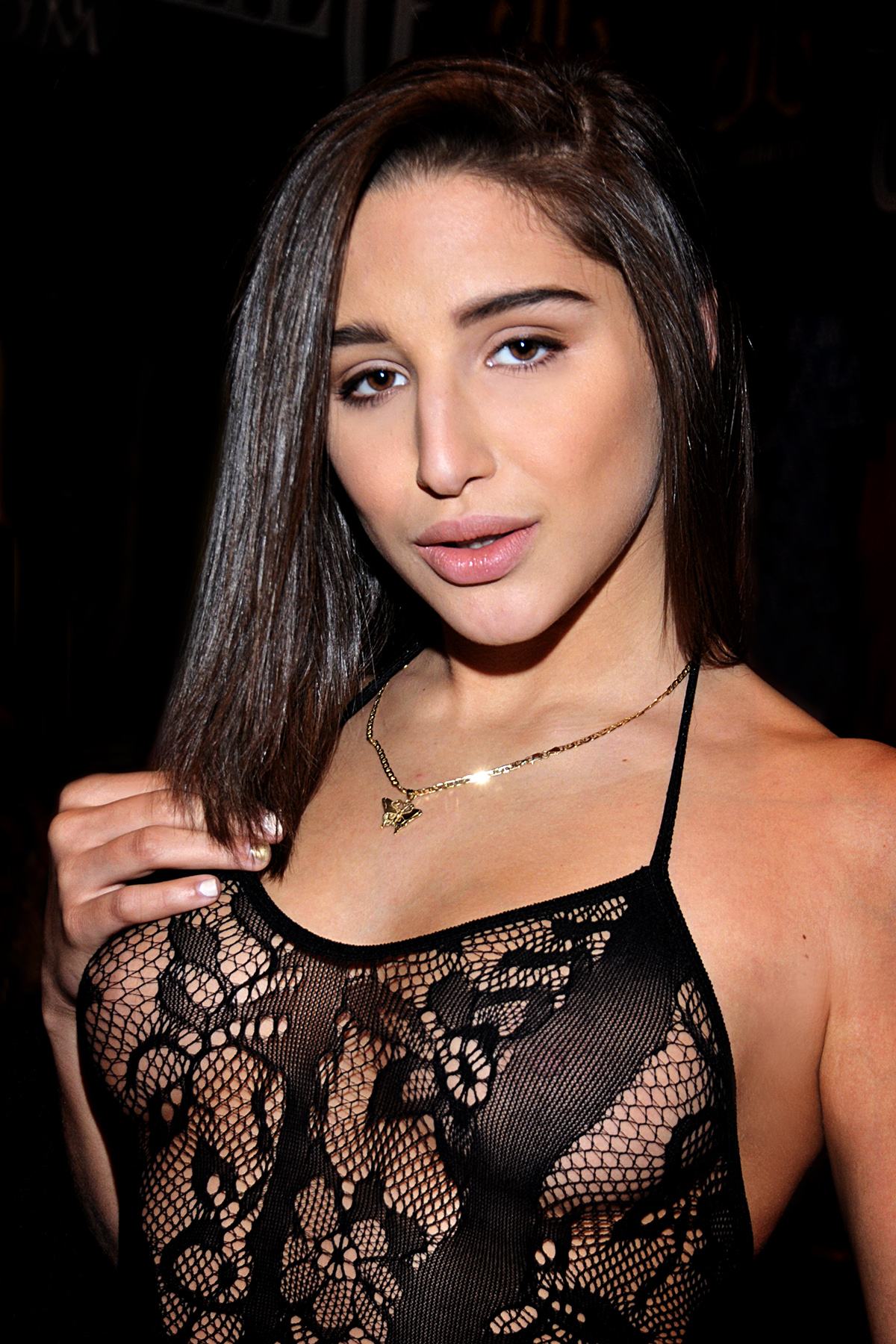
Abella Danger, Best New Starlet winner

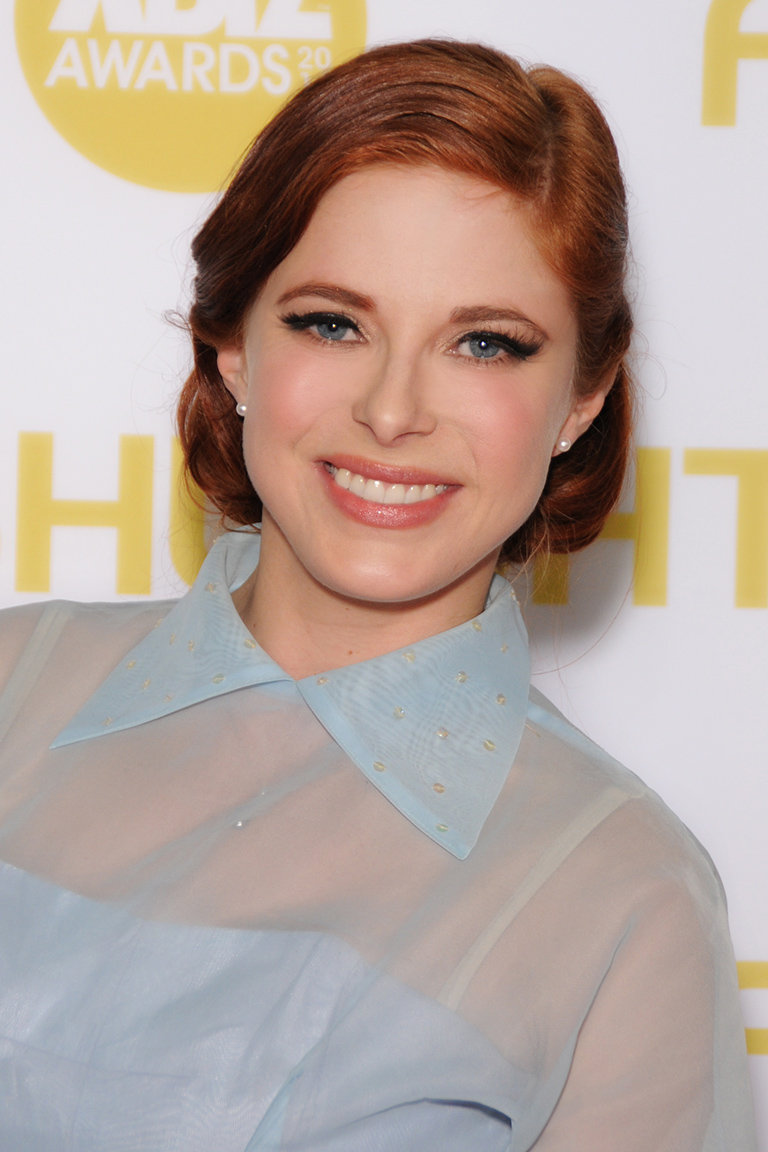
Penny Pax, Best Actress winner

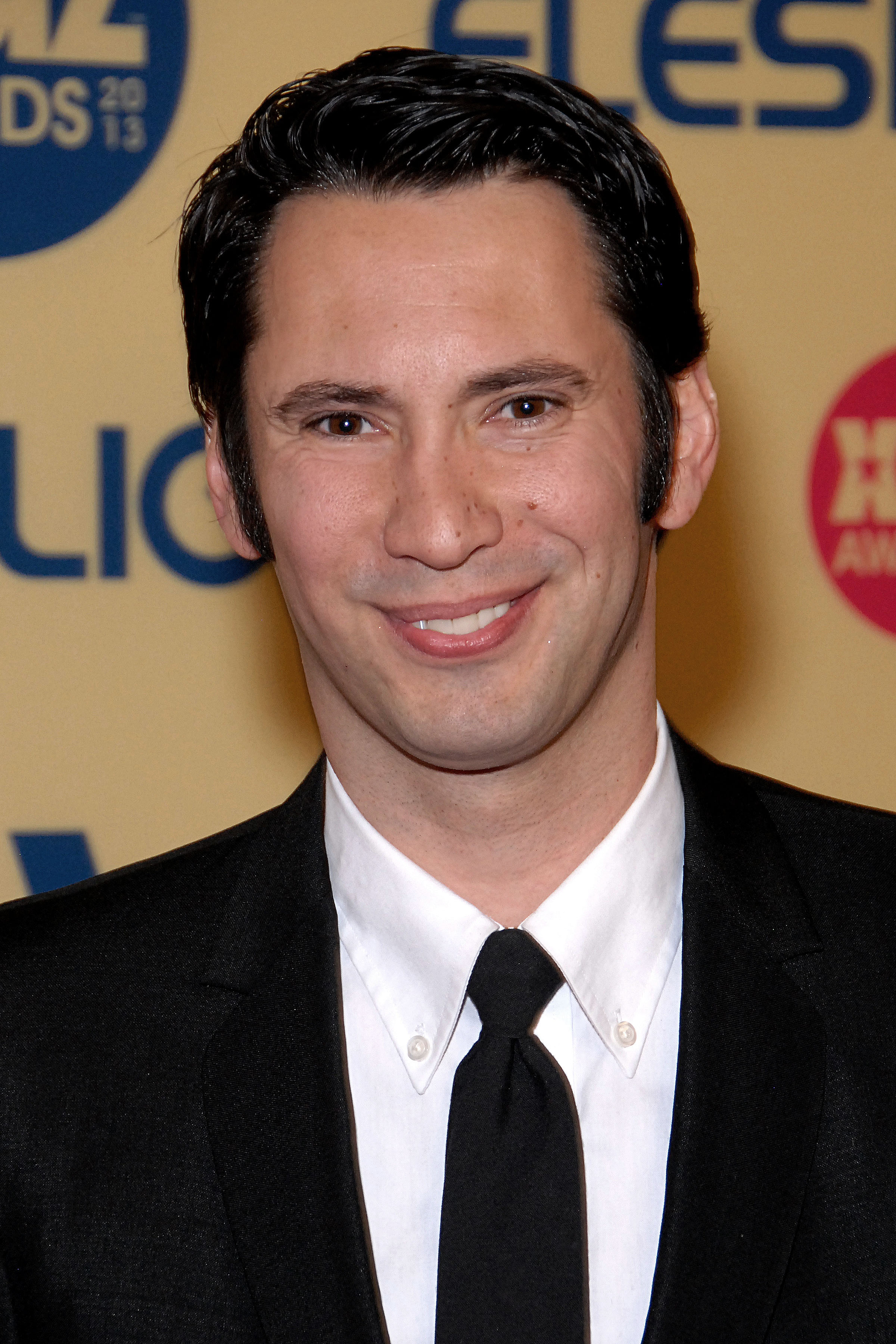
Tommy Pistol, Best Actor winner

Winners of categories announced during the awards ceremony January 23, 2016, are highlighted in boldface.

Movie of the Year	Female Performer of the Year
**Peter Pan XXX: An Axel Braun Parody**; Rather than nominees for this category, contenders are chosen from the winners in the "Best Release" categories such as Best Anthology Movie, Best Drama, Best Parody Release and several others. Voting is conducted separately just prior to the awards ceremony.	**Riley Reid**; Anikka Albrite; August Ames; A.J. Applegate; Vicki Chase; Adriana Chechik; Carter Cruise; Dani Daniels; Aidra Fox; Keisha Grey; Jillian Janson; Eva Lovia; Maddy O’Reilly; Romi Rain; Kleio Valentien
Male Performer of the Year	Best New Starlet
**Mick Blue**; Flash Brown; Xander Corvus; James Deen; Erik Everhard; Manuel Ferrara; Keiran Lee; Ramon Nomar; Tommy Pistol; Toni Ribas; Lexington Steele; Steven St. Croix; Chad White; Prince Yahshua	**Abella Danger**; Aria Alexander; Bella Bellz; Marley Brinx; Kate England; Karlee Grey; Katrina Jade; Peta Jensen; Cassidy Klein; Morgan Lee; Rachael Madori; Keira Nicole; Jade Nile; Megan Rain; Kissa Sins
Transsexual Performer of the Year	Director of the Year
**Venus Lux**; Jonelle Brooks; Delia DeLions; Jessy Dubai; Foxxy; Vixxen Goddess; Sienna Grace; Khloe Hart; Aubrey Kate; Kelli Lox; Kylie Maria; Carla Novaes; Holly Parker; Chelsea Poe; Tyra Scott	**Greg Lansky**; Mike Adriano; Brad Armstrong; James Avalon; Axel Braun; Stormy Daniels; James Deen; Manuel Ferrara; William H.; Jules Jordan; Ryan Madison; Mason; Eddie Powell; B. Skow; Jacky St. James
Best Actor	Best Actress
**Tommy Pistol, Stryker**; Richie Calhoun, The Submission of Emma Marx: Boundaries; Danny D, The Doctor; James Deen, Stockholm Syndrome; Ryan Driller, Marriage 2.0; Erik Everhard, Broken Vows; Giovanni Francesco, Batman v Superman XXX: An Axel Braun Parody; Seth Gamble, Brothers & Sisters; Danny Mountain, Lock and Load; Tyler Nixon, Housemates 2; Derrick Pierce, Magic Mike XXXL: A Hardcore Parody; Toni Ribas, Bullet to the Top; Ryan Ryder, Peter Pan XXX: An Axel Braun Parody; Michael Vegas, Shades of Kink 4; Chad White, Waiting on Love	**Penny Pax, The Submission of Emma Marx: Boundaries**; Asa Akira, Starmaker; Adriana Chechik, The Turning; Carter Cruise, Waiting on Love; Dani Daniels, Sisterhood; Stormy Daniels, Wanted; Dana DeArmond, Mother's Little Helper; Daisy Haze, Bad Romance; Kimberly Kane, Family Secrets; Remy LaCroix, Stockholm Syndrome; Keira Nicole, Peter Pan XXX: An Axel Braun Parody; Bonnie Rotten, Sisters of Anarchy; Riley Steele, Barbarella XXX: An Axel Braun Parody; India Summer, Marriage 2.0; Sarah Vandella, Love, Sex & TV News
Best Drama	Best Parody
**Wanted**; Bad Romance; Bullet to the Top; The Colombian XXX; Gone; How I Became a Sexual Slave; Love, Lust & Longing; Mother's Little Helper; My Sinful Life; Safe Landings; Saving Humanity; Starmaker; Stockholm Syndrome; A Thing of Beauty; Wild Inside	**Peter Pan XXX: An Axel Braun Parody**; American Whore Story; Batman v Superman XXX: An Axel Braun Parody; Between the Headlines: A Lesbian Porn Parody; Bob's Boners and Other Porn Parodies; Gnardians of the Galaxy and Other Porn Parodies; Joanna Angel's Making the Band; Kill Bill: A XXX Parody; Magic Mike XXXL: A Hardcore Parody; Night at the Erotic Museum; Screwing Wall Street: The ArrangementFinders IPO; Sisters of Anarchy; This Ain't Modern Family XXX; This Ain't Supernatural XXX; The Tranny Bunch
Best Star Showcase	Best Supporting Actress
**Being Riley**; Adriana's a Slut; Angela 2; Asa Akira: Wicked Fuck Doll; Carter Cruise Obsession; The Insatiable Miss Alexis Texas 2; Jesse: Sex Machine; Just Jillian; Karma's a Bitch; Meet Aidra Fox; Missy Martinez: Fucked Ra; Private Fantasies of Samantha Saint; Remy; SeXXXploitation of Abigail Mac; True Lust	**Kleio Valentien, Batman v Superman XXX: An Axel Braun Parody**; Anikka Albrite, The Turning; Julia Ann, Stryker; Skin Diamond, Love, Sex & TV News; Jessica Drake, Starmaker; Allie Haze, Love, Lust & Longing; Karla Kush, My Girlfriend's Mother 8; Abigail Mac, Flesh; Chanel Preston, This Ain't The Interview XXX; Amber Rayne, Wanted; Jessa Rhodes, Sisters of Anarchy; Celeste Star, Saving Humanity; Misty Stone, Magic Mike XXXL; Stoya, Screwing Wall Street: The ArrangementFinders IPO; Kasey Warner, Mother's Little Helper
All-Girl Performer of the Year	Fan Award: Most Epic Ass
**Shyla Jennings**; Elle Alexandra; Lily Cade; Jayden Cole; Prinzzess Felicity Jade; Sasha Heart; Kenna James; Mindi Mink; Tara Morgan; Raven Rockette; Ryan Ryans; Jenna Sativa; Angela Sommers; Tanya Tate; Vanessa Veracruz	**Alexis Texas**; Aaliyah Love, Abella Danger, A. J. Applegate, Amirah Adara, Anikka Albrite, Ash Hollywood, Bella Bellz, Carmen Valentina, Chanell Heart, Dahlia Sky, Dani Daniels, Dava Foxx, Dillion Harper, Eva Lovia, Holly Hanna, Isabella de Santos, Jada Stevens, Jenna Ashley, Jenna Ivory, Jodi Taylor, Julie Cash, Jynx Maze, Kayla-Jane Danger, Keisha Grey, Kelli Staxxx, Kelsi Monroe, Kenra Lust, Kissa Sins, Layla Price, Lea Lexis, Leya Falcon, Lola Foxx, Luna Star, Madelyn Monroe, Melissa May, Mia Malkova, Miley May, Nikki Delano, Richelle Ryan, Sadie Blair, Sadie Santana, Sarah Vandella, Savana Styles, Scarlet Red, Sovereign Syre, Summer Brielle, Sunny Lane, Veruca James, Yasmine De Leon
Best Boy/Girl Sex Scene	Best Girl/Girl Sex Scene
**Abigail Mac, Flash Brown, Black & White 4**; Kleio Valentien, Seth Gamble, Axel Braun's Inked; Carter Cruise, Derrick Pierce, Batman v Superman XXX: An Axel Braun Parody; Peta Jensen, Bill Bailey, Bra Busters 6; Marley Brinx, Steven St. Croix, The Father Figure; Eva Lovia, Keiran Lee, Flesh; Little Caprice, Marcello Bravo, In Love With Little Caprice; Aria Alexander, Ryan Madison, Make ’Em Sweat 2; India Summer, Mickey Mod, Marriage 2.0; August Ames, Manuel Ferrara, Oil Overload 12; Sara Luvv, Xander Corvus, Restraint; Rachael Madori, Ryan Madison, Rough Enough; Kissa Sins, Johnny Sins, Sins Life Part 2; Remy LaCroix, James Deen, Stockholm Syndrome (scene four); Dani Daniels, Ramon Nomar, True Erotica	**Riley Reid, Aidra Fox, Being Riley**; Abella Danger, Phoenix Marie, All Access Abella Danger; Riley Steele, Asa Akira, Barbarella XXX: An Axel Braun Parody; Skin Diamond, Alina Li, Deviant Devil: Skin Diamond; Nikki Daniels, Jenna J. Ross, Finger Lickin Girlfriends 4; Carter Cruise, Jessie Andrews, Jessie Loves Girls; Chanell Heart, Misty Stone, Lesbian First Dates; Mia Malkova, Kenna James, Mia Loves Girls; Dana DeArmond, Ava Dalush, Mother's Little Helper; Lexi Belle, Jayden Cole, Penthouse Pet All-Girl Retreat; Charlotte Stokely, Kristina Rose, Pink Velvet; Veronica Vain, Kayden Kross, Screwing Wall Street: The ArrangementFinders IPO; Shyla Jennings, Casey Calvert, Sisterly Love 2; Abigail Mac, Ryan Ryans, There’s Only One Abigail Mac; Prinzzess Felicity Jade, Jillian Janson, Women Seeking Women 110
Best Anal Sex Scene	Best Oral Sex Scene
**Riley Reid, Mick Blue, Being Riley**; Bonnie Rotten, Danny D, American Whore Story; Aidra Fox, Manuel Ferrara, Anal Beauty; Dahlia Sky, Prince Yahshua, Anal Warriors, Rachael Madori, Mick Blue, Ass Candy; Anikka Albrite, Mike Adriano, Banging Beauties; Keisha Grey, Manuel Ferrara, Big Anal Asses 3; Ana Foxxx, Mick Blue, Black Bombshells; Jada Stevens, Prince Yahshua, The Booty Movie; Adriana Chechik, Lexington Steele, Brunettes Go Black; Carter Cruise, Flash Brown, Carter Cruise Obsession; Allie Haze, Rob Piper, Interracial & Anal 2; Jillian Janson, Mick Blue, Just Jillian; Kendra Lust, Mick Blue, Miss Tushy; Kaylani Lei, Erik Everhard, Up My Asian Ass 2	**Angela White, Angela 2**; Adriana Chechik, Karmen Karma, Adriana Chechik & Karmen Karma's Through the Jeans BJ; Asa Akira, Asa Akira: Wicked Fuck Doll; Britney Amber, Batman v Superman XXX: An Axel Braun Parody; Carter Cruise, Facialized 2; London Keyes, Fluid 3; Jillian Janson, Just Jillian; Marley Brinx, Marley; Sarah Vandella, MILFs Suck; Mia Malkova, Aiden Ashley, Peter Pan XXX: An Axel Braun Parody; Samantha Saint, Juelz Ventura, Private Fantasies of Samantha Saint; Vicki Chase, Sperm Diet; Kalina Ryu, Suck Balls 4; Allie Haze, Chanel Preston, Romi Rain, Triple BJs; Alena Croft, Wet Food 6

=== Additional award winners ===
The following is the list of remaining award categories, which were presented apart from the actual awards ceremony.

**CONTENT CATEGORIES**

- BBW Performer of the Year: Karla Lane
- Best All-Girl Group Sex Scene: Angela White, Alexis Texas, Anikka Albrite, Angela 2
- Best All-Girl Movie: Angela Loves Women
- Best All-Girl Series: Women Seeking Women
- Best Amateur/Pro-Am Movie: It's My First Time 2
- Best Amateur/Pro-Am Series: Bang Bus
- Best Anal Movie: Anal Beauty
- Best Anal Series: DP Me
- Best Anthology Movie: Oil Overload 12
- Best Art Direction: Batman v Superman XXX: An Axel Braun Parody
- Best BDSM Movie: The Submission of Emma Marx: Boundaries
- Best Cinematography: Greg Lansky, Being Riley
- Best Comedy: Love, Sex & TV News
- Best Continuing Series: Dirty Rotten Mother Fuckers
- Best Director - Feature: Paul Deeb, Marriage 2.0
- Best Director – Foreign Feature: Dick Bush, The Doctor
- Best Director – Foreign Non-Feature: Alis Locanta, Waltz With Me
- Best Director – Non-Feature: Jules Jordan, Jesse: Alpha Female
- Best Director – Parody: Axel Braun, Peter Pan XXX: An Axel Braun Parody
- Best Double Penetration Sex Scene: Riley Reid, James Deen, Erik Everhard, Being Riley
- Best Editing: Eddie Powell, Gabrielle Anex, The Submission of Emma Marx: Boundaries
- Best Ethnic Movie: Latin Asses
- Best Ethnic/Interracial Series: My First Interracial
- Best Foreign Feature: The Doctor
- Best Foreign Non-Feature: Waltz With Me
- Best Gonzo Movie: Eye Contact
- Best Group Sex Scene: Keisha Grey, Mick Blue, James Deen, Jon Jon, John Strong, Erik Everhard, Gangbang Me 2
- Best Ingénue Movie: Best New Starlets 2015
- Best Interracial Movie: Black & White 3
- Best Makeup: Cammy Ellis, May Kup, Batman v Superman XXX: An Axel Braun Parody
- Best Male Newcomer: Brad Knight
- Best Marketing Campaign – Individual Project: Marriage 2.0, LionReach/Adam & Eve
- Best Marketing Campaign – Company Image: Blacked/Tushy
- Best MILF Movie: MILF Performers of the Year 2015
- Best New Imprint: Tushy
- Best New Series: All Access
- Best Non-Sex Performance: Christopher Ryan, PhD, Marriage 2.0
- Best Older Woman/Younger Girl Movie:: Lesbian Adventures: Older Women, Younger Girls 6
- Best Oral Movie: Facialized 2
- Best Orgy/Gangbang Movie: Gangbang Me 2
- Best Polyamory Movie: Marriage 2.0
- Best POV Sex Scene: Jillian Janson, Aidra Fox, Jules Jordan, Eye Contact
- Best Screenplay: Jacky St. James, The Submission of Emma Marx: Boundaries
- Best Screenplay – Parody: Axel Braun, Mark Logan, Batman v Superman XXX: An Axel Braun Parody
- Best Sex Scene in a Foreign-Shot Production: Victoria Summers, Danny D., The Doctor
- Best Solo Movie: Glamour Solos 4
- Best Solo/Tease Performance: Abigail Mac, Black & White 4
- Best Soundtrack: Wanted

**Content (ctd.)**

- Best Special Effects: Batman v Superman XXX: An Axel Braun Parody
- Best Specialty Movie – Other Genre: Cum Inside Me
- Best Specialty Series – Other Genre: Big Tit Cream Pie
- Best Supporting Actor: Steven St. Croix, Peter Pan XXX: An Axel Braun Parody
- Best Taboo Relations Movie: The Father Figure
- Best T/A Movie: Bra Busters 6
- Best Three-Way Sex Scene – Boy/Boy/Girl: Carter Cruise, Flash Brown, Jason Brown, Carter Cruise Obsession
- Best Three-Way Sex Scene – Girl/Girl/Boy: Anikka Albrite, Valentina Nappi, Mick Blue, Anikka's Anal Sluts
- Best Transsexual Movie: The Tranny Bunch
- Best Transsexual Series: The Trans X-Perience
- Best Transsexual Sex Scene: Vixxen Goddess, Adriana Chechik, TS Playground 21
- Clever Title of the Year: That Rapper Destroyed My Crapper
- Female Foreign Performer of the Year: Misha Cross
- Mainstream Star of the Year: Jessica Drake
- Male Foreign Performer of the Year: Rocco Siffredi
- MILF Performer of the Year: Kendra Lust
- Most Outrageous Sex Scene: Lea Lexis, Tommy Pistol in “Nightmare for the Dairy Council,” Analmals

**FAN AWARDS**

- Favorite Cam Girl: AngelNDemon4u or Devious Angel (There is a discrepancy between what was announced on the AVN Awards' official Twitter feed and the winners' list press release.)
- Favorite Cam Guy: Adam Sinner
- Favorite Camming Couple: Nicolah and Steven Bond
- Favorite Female Performer: Riley Reid
- Favorite Male Performer: Keiran Lee
- Favorite Trans Cam Performer: Kylie Maria
- Favorite Trans Performer: Bailey Jay
- Hottest Newcomer: Abella Danger
- Hottest MILF: Kendra Lust
- Most Amazing Sex Toy: Dani Daniels
- Most Spectacular Boobs: Hitomi Tanaka
- Social Media Star: Riley Reid

**WEB & TECHNOLOGY**

- Best Affiliate Program: Famedollars (Gamma Entertainment)
- Best Alternative Website: Kink.com
- Best Dating Website: AdultFriendFinder.com
- Best Membership Website: Blacked.com
- Best Porn Star Website: JoannaAngel.com
- Best Solo Girl Website: Vicky Vette, VickyAtHome.com
- Best Web Director: Ivan

**PLEASURE PRODUCTS**

- Best Condom Manufacturer: Kimono
- Best Enhancement Manufacturer: Classic Erotica
- Best Fetish Manufacturer: Spartacus Leathers
- Best Lingerie or Apparel Manufacturer: Syren Latex
- Best Lubricant Manufacturer: Wet International
- Best Pleasure Product Manufacturer – Large: Doc Johnson
- Best Pleasure Product Manufacturer – Medium: LELO
- Best Pleasure Product Manufacturer – Small: Advanced Response

**RETAIL & DISTRIBUTION**

- Best Boutique: Early to Bed (Chicago)
- Best Retail Chain – Small: Good Vibrations
- Best Retail Chain – Large: Romantix
- Best Web Retail Store: AdultEmpire.com

==== Multiple nominations and awards ====
Movies that received the most nominations
Nominations	Movie
21	Peter Pan XXX: An Axel Braun Parody
18	Batman v Superman XXX: An Axel Braun Parody
16	Angela 2
13	Gangbang Me 2
12	Marriage 2.0
12	Turning: A Lesbian Horror Story
11	Meet Aidra Fox
11	Slut Puppies 9
11	Wanted
11	Brazzers House
10	Doctor
10	Submission Of Emma Marx 2: Boundaries
10	Sisterhood
10	Just Jillian
10	Magic Mike XXXL
10	Stockholm Syndrome
10	Being Riley

The following 12 releases received multiple awards:

Awards	Movie
5	Being Riley
5	Batman v Superman XXX: An Axel Braun Parody
4	Marriage 2.0
4	Peter Pan XXX: An Axel Braun Parody
4	The Submission of Emma Marx: Boundaries
3	The Doctor
2	Angela 2
2	Black and White 4
2	Eye Contact
2	Gangbang Me 2
2	Waltz With Me
2	Wanted

=== Honorary AVN awards ===
==== Visionary Award ====
The Visionary Award went to AVN founder Paul Fishbein.

==== Hall of Fame ====
AVN on December 18, 2015, announced the 2016 inductees into its hall of fame:

- Founders Branch: Fred Hirsch, Rudy Sutton, Eddie Wedelstedt
- Video Branch: Joanna Angel, Nikki Benz, DCypher, Jonni Darkko, Dana DeArmond, Nikita Denise, Tommy Gunn, Kimberly Kane, Sascha Koch, Alex Ladd, Teagan Presley, John Strong, Shyla Stylez, Dana Vespoli, Vicky Vette
- Executive Branch: Jon Blitt, Bob Christian, Scott David, Eric Gutterman, Steve Volponi, Nelson X
- Pleasure Products Branch: Ralph Caplan, Rina Valan, Steve Shubin
- Internet Founders Branch: Charles Berrebbi and John Albright, Ilan Bunimovitz

== Presenters and performers ==
The following individuals presented awards or performed musical numbers or comedy sketches.

=== Presenters ===
Name(s)	Role
Rob Piper; Brett Rossi; Katrina Jade	Presenters of the award for Best Boy/Girl Sex Scene
Carter Cruise	Presenter of the award for Best New Starlet
Katie Morgan; Janice Griffith; Alex Gray	Presenters of the award for Best Actress
Nick Hawk; Skin Diamond; Jacky St. James	Presenters of the award for All Girl Performer Of The Year and Best Parody
Shawna Lenee	Presenter of the award for Favorite CamGirl and Best Girl Girl Scene

=== Performers ===
Name(s)	Role	Performed
Mark Stone and the AVN Orchestra	Musical Director/Producer	Orchestral
Hustler Club dancers	Performers	Backup Dancers
Kate Quigley	Performer	Standup comedy segment
Anikka Albrite; Joanna Angel	Performers	Song and dance number: “That’s What Porn is All About”
Waka Flocka Flame; Southside	Performer	Hip-hop musical numbers: “No Hands” and “Round of Applause”

== Ceremony information ==
For the first time, content released solely on video-on-demand is eligible for AVN Awards consideration. AVN announced VOD content would be eligible in the Best Boy/Girl Sex Scene, Best Girl/Girl Sex Scene, Best Oral Sex Scene and Best Anal Sex Scene categories. As usual, several of the categories were renamed and redefined and a new niche category was added, Best Polyamory Movie.

AVN has also stated that porn star James Deen, who has been the subject of publicized assault allegations, will continue to be eligible for awards in categories he or his production company has been nominated for, since the awards "do not reflect an official position on any other matter involving James Deen."

== See also ==
- AVN Award
- AVN Award for Male Foreign Performer of the Year
- AVN Female Performer of the Year Award
- List of members of the AVN Hall of Fame
