= Carter Cruise =

American pornographic actress

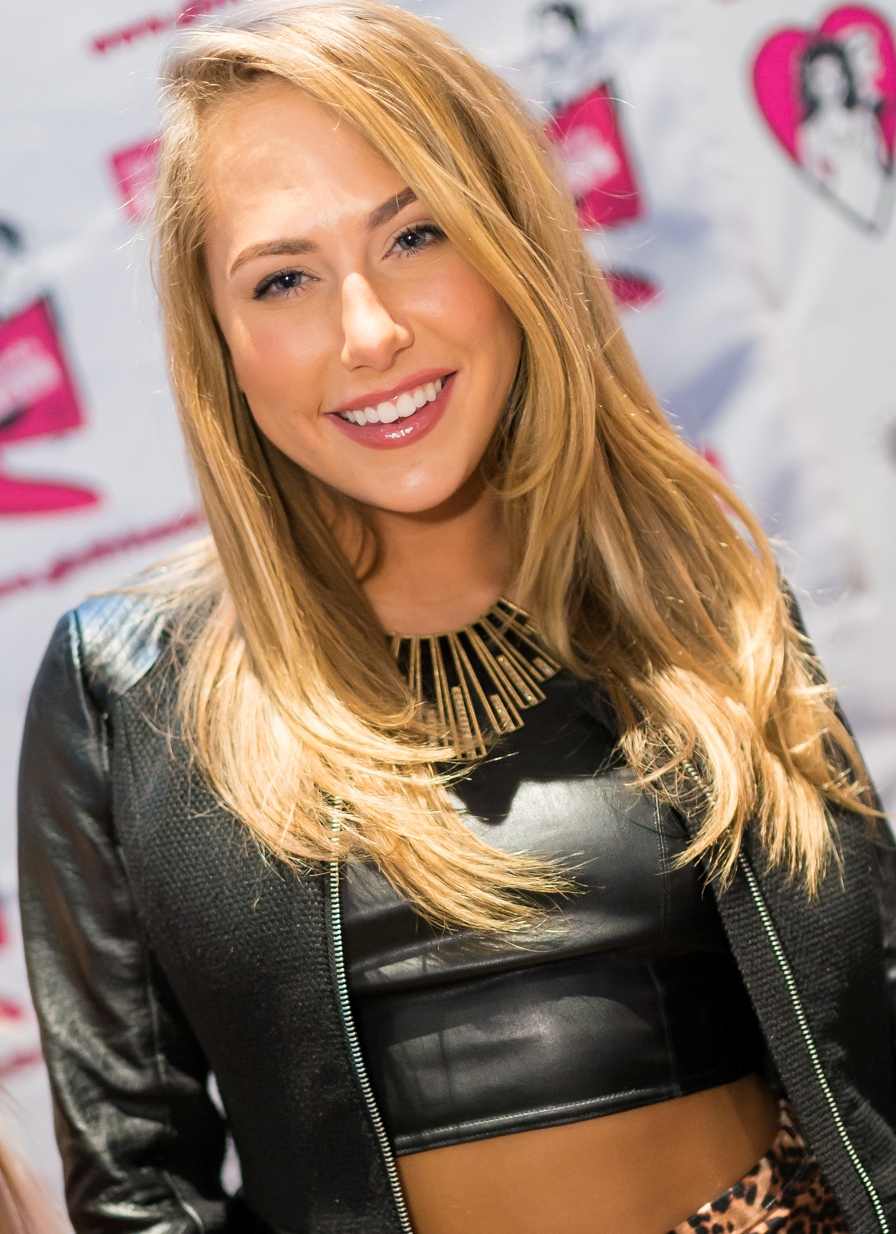
- Cruise in 2015
- Born: Atlanta, Georgia, U.S.
- Education: East Carolina University
- Occupations: Pornographic actress; model; DJ; record producer; podcaster
- Years active: 2013–2018 (pornography); 2015–present (music)
- Awards: Full list

Carter Cruise is an American DJ, record producer, podcaster and former pornographic film actress.

== Early life and education ==
Carter Cruise was born in Atlanta, Georgia, and raised in Cary, North Carolina. She was home schooled during her childhood and went to Cary High School. In 2009, she enrolled at East Carolina University, majoring in psychology and pre-law. While in school, she was heavily involved in Greek life, pledging a sorority as a freshman. In late 2013, she left her psychology studies at ECU to pursue a full-time career in the adult industry. Prior to becoming an adult film performer, she worked as a Hooters girl and lifeguard.

== Career ==
=== Adult modeling and films ===
Cruise began working as a pornographic film actress in the summer of 2013. She made her porn debut in August of that year after contacting the Florida-based talent agency East Coast Talents. Her first agent advised her to market herself towards older men, but she instead marketed her brand towards both male and female college students. She moved to Los Angeles in March 2014 and signed with the agency Spiegler Girls in June. That same month, she was featured in AVN's "fresh" issue.

Cruise stated that she was interested in making extreme movies that explore issues of female submissiveness and consent. She cited Sasha Grey as an influence in that regard, specifically by the way Grey expressed vulnerability in her own films. Cruise appeared in several features, including American Hustle XXX from Smash Pictures and Cinderella XXX. In 2014, she was cast as the lead in director Jacky St. James' romance feature Second Chances, produced by New Sensations.

In 2015, Cruise became the second performer to ever win AVN Award's Best New Starlet and Best Actress in the same year, after Jenna Jameson in 1996. In October 2015, she signed an exclusive one-year contract with Axel Braun Productions.

Cruise was the subject of a 2014 article by Cosmopolitan magazine's website called "Sex Work", which profiles women who have careers in sex-related industries. She is friends with fellow collegiate porn actress Belle Knox. With encouragement from her father, Cruise contacted Knox as she believed she would be "one of the few people who could really understand what [Knox] was going through." With regard to the publicity that Knox received, Cruise commented that she was "disgusted and appalled by the way civilized society tormented an 18-year-old woman for being sexual. The whole affair really demonstrated how important it is that we improve sexual education and tackle stigmas, as well as foster compassion and empathy between people."

In 2016, CNBC named Cruise one of the 12 most popular pornographic film actresses.

=== Music and writing ===
In a 2014 interview, Cruise stated that she had started working on several songs, in addition to writing for various outlets, including sex advice blogs. In 2015, Cruise featured on the single "DUNNIT" by Styles&Complete. In 2017, Cruise began DJing at college fraternity parties and released her debut single "Everybody Nose Me". In August 2018, she released her debut EP, Send Moods. The following year, Cruise revealed that she was working on a follow-up EP titled Sin Music.

== Personal life ==
In a 2014 interview for the online edition of Cosmopolitan magazine, Cruise revealed that she has always wanted to be in the entertainment industry. She went on to say that she had not originally intended to go to college but did so to continue a relationship with a man she was dating. After taking a semester off to assess and plan her future, she came up with the concept of "Carter Cruise" as a brand and as a means to accomplish her goals with regards to writing, acting, music, and fashion. Cruise stated, "How can I do all of these things in one lifetime? Porn was the first step because it gave me the capital and the connections to not only build my brand but also to lay the foundations for other creative things that I wanted to get involved in."

Cruise has stated that both her parents know about her career choice and are supportive. She also explained that she was "100 percent aware of the stigma of porn when I made the decision to do it. What I'm doing is risky and I totally understand that and I understood the risk. A year ago I was sitting in class wondering what the hell I was going to do with my life and last night I got nine AVN nominations."

== Discography ==
=== Studio EPs ===
- Send Moods (2018)

=== Singles ===
- "Everybody Nose Me" (2017)
- "Literally Like Yeah" (2018)
- "Diggin' U" (2018)
- "Sippin' on Danger" (2018)
- "We Were" (2018)
- "Bones Shake" (2019)

== Awards and nominations ==
List of accolades received by Carter Cruise
Awards & nominations
Award	Won	Nominated
AVN Awards	3	18
Doppio Senso Night Awards	1	–
NightMoves Awards	2	1
XBIZ Awards	4	8
XRCO Awards	1	3
- Total number of wins and nominations
Totals	11	30

AVN Awards
Year	Result	Award	Film
2015	Won	Best Actress	Second Chances
2015	Nominated	Best All-Girl Group Sex Scene (with Samantha Saint & Penny Pax)	Cinderella XXX: An Axel Braun Parody
2015	Nominated	Best All-Girl Group Sex Scene (with Anikka Albrite, Dana DeArmond, Sara Luvv, Marina Angel & Cati Parker)	Twisted Fate
2015	Nominated	Best Double Penetration Sex Scene (with Ramon Nomar & Erik Everhard)	Meet Carter
2015	Nominated	Best Group Sex Scene (with Dani Daniels, Candice Dare, Aidra Fox, Jillian Janson & Manuel Ferrara)	Manuel Ferrara's Reverse Gangbang 2
2015	Won	Best New Starlet	—N/a
2015	Nominated	Best Oral Sex Scene (with Penny Pax)	Cinderella XXX: An Axel Braun Parody
2015	Nominated	Best Three-Way Sex Scene – B/B/G (with Van Wylde & Kurt Lockwood)	American Hustle XXX Porn Parody
2016	Nominated	Best Actress	Waiting on Love
2016	Nominated	Best All-Girl Group Sex Scene (with Adriana Chechik, Jelena Jensen & Tara Morgan)	The Turning
2016	Nominated	Best Anal Sex Scene (with Flash Brown)	Carter Cruise Obsession
2016	Nominated	Best Boy/Girl Sex Scene (with Derrick Pierce)	Batman v Superman XXX: An Axel Braun Parody
2016	Nominated	Best Double Penetration Sex Scene (with Ramon Nomar & Toni Ribas)	All Access Carter Cruise
2016	Nominated	Best Girl/Girl Sex Scene (with Jessie Andrews)	Jessie Loves Girls
2016	Nominated	Best Group Sex Scene (with Anikka Albrite, Skin Diamond, Dahlia Sky, Adriana Chechik & Mick Blue)	Mick Blue Is One Lucky Bastard
2016	Nominated	Best Group Sex Scene (with Bill Bailey, Chris Strokes, Jessy Jones, John Strong, Mark Wood & Ramon Nomar)	Slut Puppies 9
2016	Nominated	Best Oral Sex Scene	Facialized 2
2016	Won	Best Three-Way Sex Scene – Boy/Boy/Girl (with Flash Brown & Jason Brown)	Carter Cruise Obsession
2016	Nominated	Best Three-Way Sex Scene – G/G/B (with Jessa Rhodes & Manuel Ferrara)	Fluid 3
2016	Nominated	Female Performer of the Year	—N/a
2016	Nominated	Mainstream Star of the Year	—N/a

Doppio Senso Night Awards
Year	Result	Award	Film
2015	Won	Best International New Starlet	—N/a

NightMoves Awards
Year	Result	Award	Film
2014	Won	Best New Starlet (Fan's Choice)	—N/a
2015	Nominated	Best Female Performer	—N/a
2016	Won	Best All-Girl Release	Annika and Carter

XBIZ Awards
Year	Result	Award	Film
2015	Won	Best Oral Scene (with Miguel Silva)	Step-bro loves new step-sister
2015	Won	Best Actress – Feature Movie	Second Chances
2015	Nominated	Best Actress – Couples-Themed Release	Happy Anniversary
2015	Won	Best Actress – All-Girl Release	Lesbian Vampire Academy
2015	Nominated	Best Supporting Actress	American Hustle XXX
2015	Nominated	Best Scene – Feature Movie (with Chad White)	Second Chances
2015	Nominated	Best Scene – All-Girl (with A.J. Applegate)	Fucking Girls 8
2016	Nominated	Female Performer of the Year	—N/a
2016	Nominated	Best Sex Scene – Couples-Themed Release (with Marcus London)	Forbidden Affairs: The Stepdaughter 3
2016	Won	Best Sex Scene – All-Girl (with Jessie Andrews)	Jessie Loves Girls
2016	Nominated	Best Sex Scene – All-Girl (with Adriana Chechik, Abella Danger & Phoenix Marie)	Buttslammers
2016	Nominated	Best Sex Scene – All-Girl (with Kayden Kross)	Carter Cruise Wide Open

XRCO Awards
Year	Result	Award	Film
2015	Nominated	Best Actress	Second Chances
2015	Won	New Starlet	—N/a
2015	Nominated	Cream Dream	—N/a
2015	Nominated	Orgasmic Oralist	—N/a
