= Brendon Miller =

American pornographic actor and musician (born 1976)

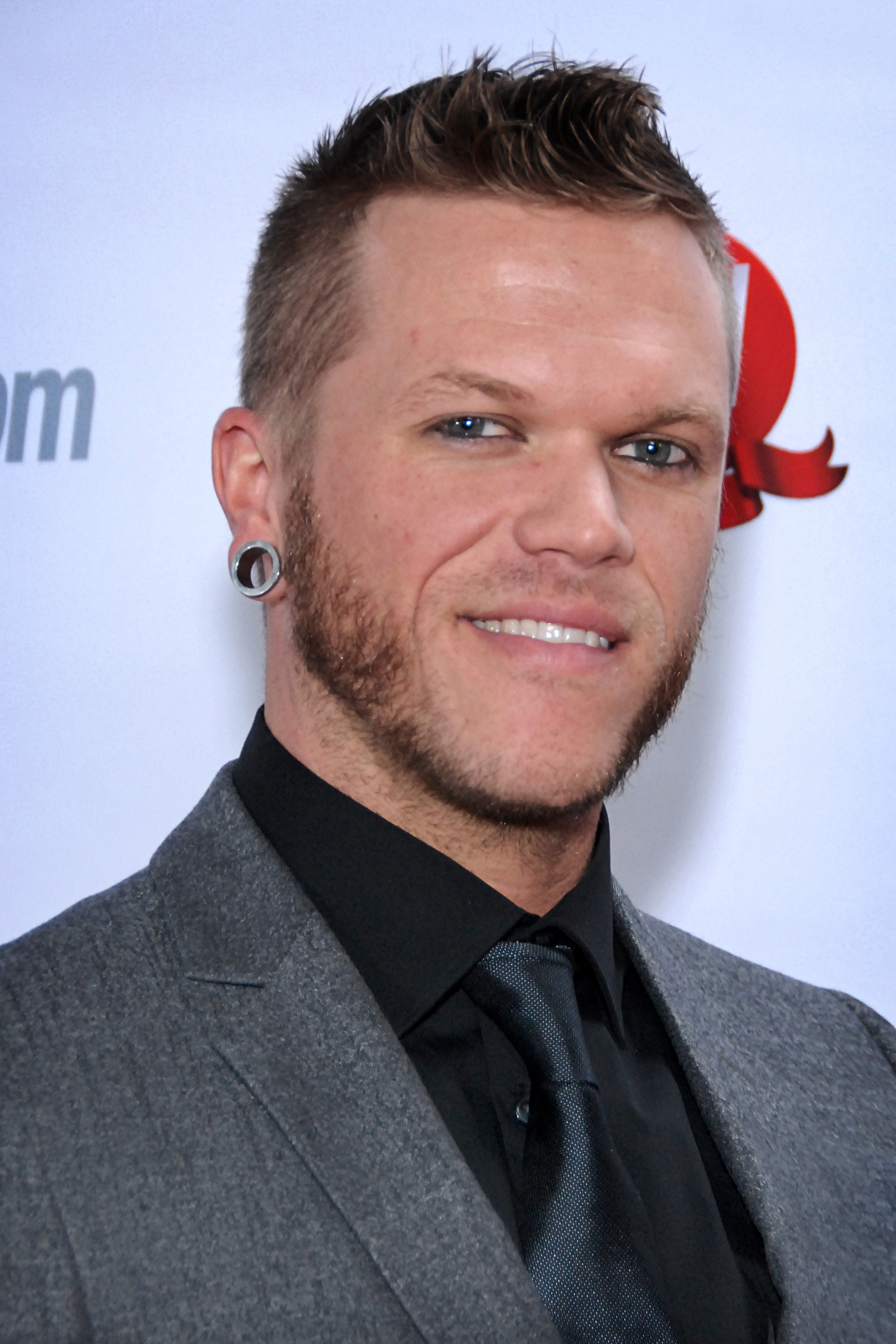
- Miller at the AVN Awards in Las Vegas in 2013
- Born: Glendon Crain; August 30, 1976 (age 50); Kansas City, Kansas, U.S.
- Other name: Brendon Miller
- Height: 6 ft 1 in (1.85 m)
- Spouse: Stormy Daniels (m. 2015; div. 2018)
- Children: 1
- Musical career
- Genre: Rock
- Instrument: Drums
- Formerly of: The Feds; Loser; New Dead Radio; All Hail the Yeti; Godhead; The Wicked Outlaws

Brendon Miller (born Glendon Crain; August 30, 1976) is an American pornographic actor and musician.

== Career ==
=== Music ===
Prior to his career as a pornographic actor, Miller was a drummer for several bands. He began his music career with The Feds, with whom he recorded five albums, leaving in 2001. He then played with John 5's band Loser, but their debut album was not released due to John 5's involvement with Rob Zombie's live band. Miller briefly left Loser during the recording of "Disposable Sunshine", where he was replaced by Elias Andra. Miller also played with Jason Christopher's band New Dead Radio, and their only album was released in 2005. The same year, he formed All Hail the Yeti with Connor Garritty and KJ Duval, but left to join Godhead full-time. In 2008, Miller joined Hollywood Undead as a touring member, where he was given the stage name "Biscuitz". He later twice rejoined All Hail the Yeti, and in 2016, filled in for Red Tide Rising drummer Matt Guerin, who was celebrating his honeymoon.

Miller is also the lead singer of The Wicked Outlaws. In addition to singing, he is also a songwriter. In 2015, he created a country rock song and music video, "On the Run", for the pornographic film Wanted.

=== Pornography ===
In 2012, Miller portrayed The Joker in The Dark Knight XXX: An Axel Braun Parody, directed by Axel Braun He won the 2013 XBIZ Award for Best Supporting Actor for his role in the film. Although he retired from performing in 2014 to focus on his music career, he returned to the industry in 2015 to reprise his role as the Joker for Batman v Superman XXX: An Axel Braun Parody.

Miller has edited approximately half of the movies that Stormy Daniels has produced.

== Personal life ==
Miller was married to Stormy Daniels from 2015 to 2018. They have a daughter born in January 2011. In July 2018, Miller filed for divorce alleging Daniels' adultery, and requested full custody of their daughter.

== Awards and nominations ==
Brendon Miller awards and nominations
Awards and nominations
Award	Wins	Nominations
AVN Awards	0	8
NightMoves Awards	1	3
XBIZ Awards	2	9
XRCO Awards	0	1

Totals (Note: Certain award groups do not simply award one winner. They acknowledge several different recipients, have runners-up, and have third place. Since this is a specific recognition and is different from losing an award, runner-up mentions are considered wins in this award tally. For simplification and to avoid errors, each award in this list has been presumed to have had a prior nomination.)
- Wins: 3
- Nominations: 21

AVN Awards
Year	Result	Award	Film
2012	Nominated	Best Male Newcomer	—N/a
2013	Nominated	Best Actor	Happy Endings
2013	Nominated	Best Supporting Actor	The Dark Knight XXX: A Porn Parody
2014	Nominated	Best Actor	Divorcees
2014	Nominated	Best Safe Sex Scene (with Stormy Daniels)	First Crush
2015	Nominated	Best Actor	Thor XXX: An Axel Braun Parody
2016	Nominated	Best Supporting Actor	Batman v Superman XXX: An Axel Braun Parody
2016	Nominated	Best Three-Way Sex Scene – G/G/B (with Kleio Valentien & Aiden Ashley)	Batman v Superman XXX: An Axel Braun Parody

NightMoves Awards
Year	Result	Award
2012	Won	Best Male Performer (Editor Choice)
2013	Nominated	Best Male Performer
2014	Nominated	Best Male Performer
2015	Nominated	Best Male Performer

XBIZ Awards
Year	Result	Award	Film
2012	Nominated	New Male Performer of the Year	—N/a
2013	Won	Best Supporting Actor	The Dark Knight XXX: A Porn Parody
2013	Nominated	Best Scene – Parody Release (with Penny Pax)	The Dark Knight XXX: A Porn Parody
2014	Nominated	Best Actor – Feature Movie	Change of Heart
2014	Nominated	Best Supporting Actor	Divorcees
2015	Nominated	Best Actor – Feature Movie	Second Chances
2015	Nominated	Best Actor – Parody Release	Thor XXX: An Axel Braun Parody
2016	Nominated	Best Actor – Feature Release	Wanted
2016	Nominated	Best Sex Scene – Feature Release (with Stormy Daniels)	Wanted
2016	Won	Best Supporting Actor	Batman vs. Superman XXX: An Axel Braun Parody
2016	Nominated	Best Sex Scene – Parody Release (with Aiden Ashley & Kleio Valentien)	Batman vs. Superman XXX: An Axel Braun Parody

XRCO Awards
Year	Result	Award
2012	Nominated	New Stud
