= Amber Rayne =

American pornographic film actress (1984–2016)

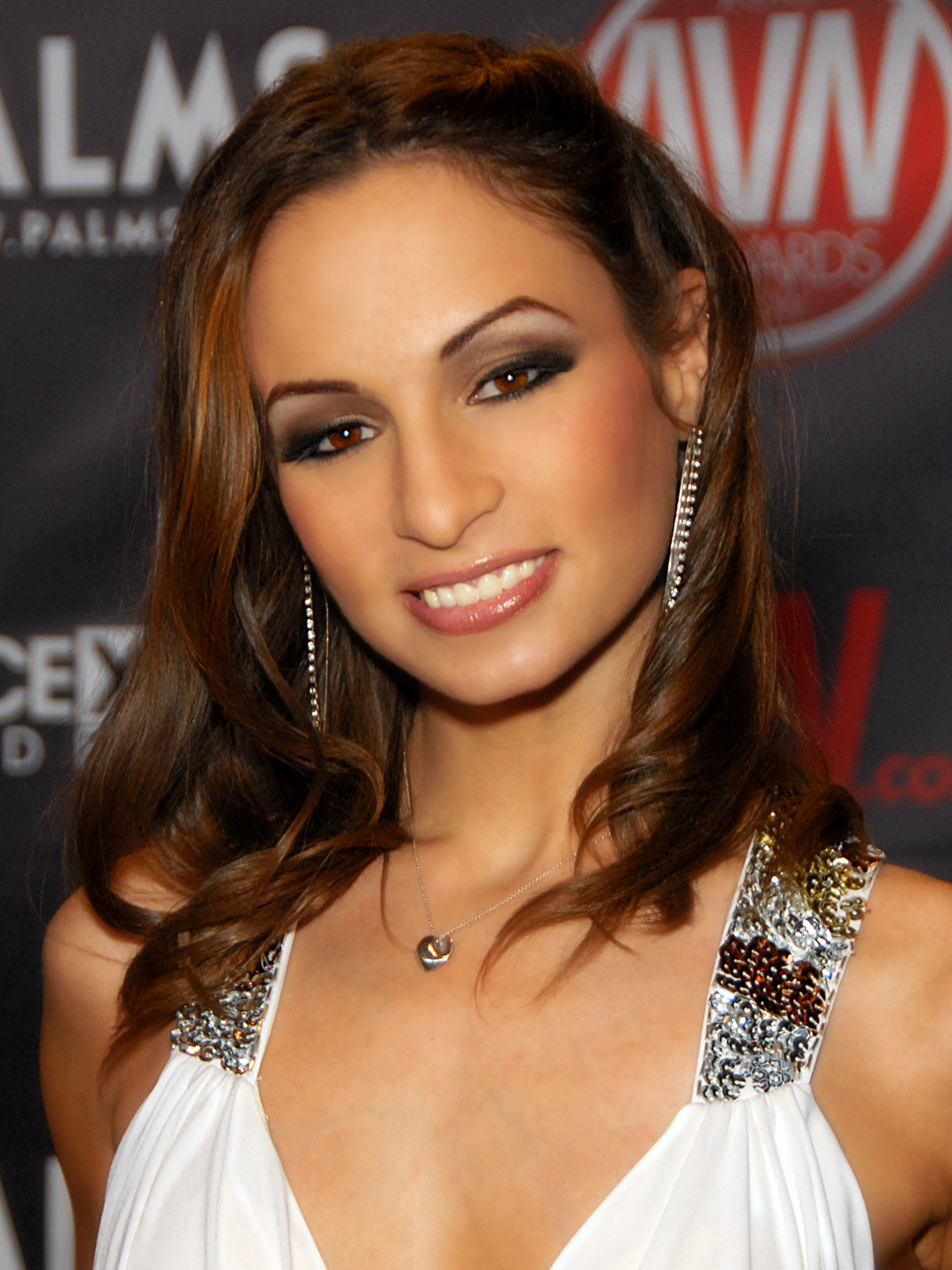
- Rayne in 2010
- Born: Meghan Wren; September 19, 1984; Detroit, Michigan, U.S.
- Died: April 2, 2016 (aged 31); Sun Valley, Los Angeles, California, U.S.
- Education: California State University, Los Angeles
- Occupation: Pornographic film actress
- Years active: 2005–2015

Meghan Wren (September 19, 1984 – April 2, 2016), known professionally as Amber Rayne, was an American pornographic film actress active in the adult film industry from 2005 until retiring in 2015. She was named Unsung Starlet of the Year at the 2009 AVN Awards.

Rayne came to greater public awareness in 2015 when she accused fellow pornographic film performer James Deen of sexually assaulting her during a film shoot in 2006. Deen, who had been accused of similar acts by other women in the industry, denied the allegations.

== Early life ==
Rayne was born Megan Wren in Detroit, Michigan, and raised in Northern California.

== Career ==
Rayne entered the adult film industry in 2005, eventually earning over 500 credits as a performer. In April 2015, she announced her retirement. She came out of retirement to shoot her final adult film, Wanted, later that year. She had already promised the film's director, Stormy Daniels, that she would be part of the film six years before shooting it. Besides performing, Rayne also worked in the adult film industry as a director, producer, and editor.

Rayne came to greater public awareness in 2015 when she joined several other adult film actresses in accusing fellow performer James Deen of sexual assault. Rayne alleged that during a filming session in 2006, Deen punched her in the face and injured her through aggressive anal penetration. Deen denied the allegations.

== Personal life and death ==
Rayne was a BDSM enthusiast both on screen and in her personal life. She owned rabbits and a mule named Zephyr.

On April 2, 2016, Rayne collapsed and died at her home in Los Angeles, California. On June 28, 2016, the Los Angeles County Coroner's Office announced that her death was caused by an accidental cocaine overdose.

== Awards and nominations ==
Year	Ceremony	Result	Category	Film
2007	AVN Award	Nominated	Most Outrageous Sex Scene (with Gokkun Boys)	American Gokkun
2008	AVN Award	Nominated	Unsung Starlet of the Year	—N/a
2009	AVN Award	Nominated	Best All-Girl 3-Way Sex Scene (with Kissy Kapri & Trinity Post)	Bitch & Moan 2
2009	AVN Award	Nominated	Best All-Girl Group Sex Scene (with Penny Flame, Ariel X, Louisa Lanewood, Holly West, Rachel Roxxx, Aline, Lexi Belle & Deena Daniels)	Bad News Bitches 3
2009	AVN Award	Nominated	Best Threeway Sex Scene (with Lexi Belle & Sergio)	Bad News Bitches 3
2009	AVN Award	Nominated	Most Outrageous Sex Scene (with Dick James & Johnny Thrust)	Cuckold 3
2009	AVN Award	Won	Unsung Starlet of the Year	—N/a
2009	FAME Award	Finalist	Favorite Underrated Star	—N/a
2009	XRCO Award	Won	Unsung Siren	—N/a
2010	AVN Award	Nominated	Best All-Girl Group Sex Scene (with Megan Jones, Adriana Deville, Allison Pierce, Jaelyn Fox, Mason Moore, Janet Mason & Nikki Sexx)	Big Toy Orgy
2010	AVN Award	Nominated	Best All-Girl Group Sex Scene (with Kylie Ireland, Sammie Rhodes, Keanni Lei, Bobbi Starr & Heather Starlet)	The Violation of Kylie Ireland
2010	AVN Award	Nominated	Best Group Sex Scene (with Darryl Hanah, Trinity Post, Jerry & Tyler Knight)	The 8th Day
2010	AVN Award	Nominated	Best Supporting Actress	The 8th Day
2010	AVN Award	Nominated	Female Performer of the Year	—N/a
2010	AVN Award	Nominated	Most Outrageous Sex Scene (with Mya Nichole & Will Steiger)	Deep Anal Abyss 2
2012	AVN Award	Nominated	Best All-Girl Group Sex Scene (with Tara Lynn Foxx & Zoey Holloway)	Rezervoir Doggs: An Exquisite Films Parody
2012	AVN Award	Nominated	Most Outrageous Sex Scene (with Johnny Thrust)	Saw: A Hardcore Parody
2013	AVN Award	Nominated	Best All-Girl Group Sex Scene (with Ash Hollywood & April O'Neil)	Buffy the Vampire Slayer XXX: A Parody
2013	XBIZ Award	Nominated	Best Scene – All-Girl (with Ash Hollywood & April O'Neil)	Buffy the Vampire Slayer XXX: A Parody
2016	AVN Award	Nominated	Best Supporting Actress	Wanted
2016	XBIZ Award	Nominated	Best Supporting Actress	Wanted
2016	XRCO Award	Won	Unsung Siren	—N/a
