= DogFart =

American adult film production company

- Industry: Pornography
- Genre: Ethnic pornography
- Founded: 1996; 30 years ago
- Founders: Ashton Sheppard
- Headquarters: United States
- Area served: Worldwide
- Products: Pornographic films
- Parent: Gamma Entertainment Inc.
- Website: dogfartnetwork.com

DogFart is an American Internet pornography production company that specializes in interracial pornography including such websites as Blacksonblondes.com, the gay website BlacksOnBoys.com, GloryHole.com and CuckoldSessions.com among others.

== Company ==
Founded in 1996, DogFart has since its beginnings specialized in producing interracial pornography, generally black male and white female pornography.

DogFart is owned by its parent company Gamma Entertainment Inc. and the head of pay websites, Claude Hyppolite stated, "Dogfart is synonymous with interracial porn and we’re thrilled to provide an upgraded and enhanced experience for both existing and new members."

Adult film actor Flash Brown performed his very first adult scene with DogFart.

DogFart also specializes in porn parodies.

In 2000, the CEO of DogFart, Cable Rosenberg, was accused of diverting users who wrongly typed "geociities" with an additional letter "i" in their web browsers were sent to one of the DogFart websites, Blacksonblondes.com, Rosenberg denied any wrongdoing.

In 2015, DogFart offered Kim Davis, the Kentucky city clerk who was imprisoned for refusing to issue LGBTQ marriage licenses after gay marriage was legalized nationally in the United States, half a million dollars to perform an interracial lesbian sex scene for its website ZebraGirls.com.

Also in 2015, DogFart approached Rachel Dolezal, a white woman and president of a chapter of the NAACP who was outed for pretending to be a black woman, to be paid fifty thousand dollars to film four scenes for the company. Dolezal declined DogFart's offer.

In 2018, a black adult film actor, Maurice McKnight, known in adult films as Moe the Monster, filed a lawsuit against DogFart after claiming he was called a racial slur twice during an ejaculation scene by a white female co-star, Deborah Hinkle, whose porn name is Ryan Conner, was present during both exchanges but she said the word twice anyway while filming the ejaculation scene.

In 2023, Gamma Entertainment Inc. premiered a redesign of its pay website BlacksOnBlondes.com, the DogFart Network, plus an improved members only area called DFXtra.com to access content including in excess of 5,000 adult videos and more than 20 content channels.

== Awards ==
DogFart has won and been nominated for multiple adult film industry awards including the AVN Awards and the XBIZ Awards.

In 2018, DogFart was the winner of the AVN Award for Clever Title of the Year for the adult movie Black Loads Matter, a parody of Black Lives Matter.

== See also ==
- Ethnic pornography
- Race and sexuality
- Sexual fetishism
