= Wanted (2015 film) =

2015 film directed by Stormy Daniels

- Directed by: Stormy Daniels
- Production companies: Wicked Pictures; Adam & Eve
- Release date: September 16, 2015
- Running time: 179 minutes

Wanted is a 2015 Western pornographic film directed by Stormy Daniels and produced by Wicked Pictures and Adam & Eve.

== Plot ==
Frank Garrett (Jay Crew) is a wealthy landowner who is in love with Joanna (Anikka Albrite), a prostitute. Garrett is sick and has a short time left to live, so he hands Joanna a copy of the deed to the north end of his ranch, along with a map. Garrett dies shortly after and Joanna is wrongfully accused of murdering and attempting to rob him by Sheriff Clayton (Steven St. Croix), who orders her to be hanged. The Sheriff did so because he wanted the deed she had inherited. Meanwhile, Dani (Stormy Daniels) arrives in Diablo City for a big poker tournament, where she intends to win enough money to help her friend Birdie (Amber Rayne) save the family ranch. Dani learns about Joanna's situation from Garrett's assistant, Samuel (Eric Masterson), and Joanna's friend, Lilah (Allie Haze), when the poker game is broken up by her rowdy arrest. Dani decides to save Joanna by engaging in a shootout with Sheriff Clayton and his posse, then fleeing the town with her. Morgan (Brendon Miller), a bounty hunter, arrives as Sheriff Clayton is asking for someone to apprehend them and agrees to help. Dani had previously robbed Morgan while she was working as a prostitute on Bourbon Street in New Orleans. When Morgan locates Dani, she makes a deal with him to split her share of whatever is found at Garrett's ranch. Samuel returns home to retrieve the original deed for Garrett's land and ask his wife Sally (Jodi Taylor) to hand it to Marshal Lane (Brad Armstrong) in Yuma. The pursuit concludes in a showdown between Dani, Sheriff Clayton, and their posses.

== Cast ==
- Steven St. Croix as Sheriff Clayton
- Anikka Albrite as Joanna
- Jay Crew as Frank Garrett
- Jessica Drake as Pearl Garrett
- Stormy Daniels as Dani
- Amber Rayne as Birdie
- Eric Masterson as Samuel
- Allie Haze as Lilah
- Brendon Miller as Morgan
- Dick Chibbles as Dale
- Cassidy Klein as Nurse Alice
- Tommy Gunn as Taza
- Mia Li as Eela
- Jodi Taylor as Sally
- Brad Armstrong as Marshal Lane
- Ryan McLane as Dani's client
- Chanel Preston as Hannah

== Production ==
Stormy Daniels began writing the script over eight years prior to filming. The film was shot in 2015 between June 18 and June 29, although there were four off days during that time. Filming took place in Agua Dulce for three days, Malibu for two days, an old western town outside Palm Springs for a day, and Altadena for a day. The film is set in 1879 in Diablo City, Arizona, which is based on Dodge City, Kansas. Daniels spent two months researching the year 1879 in order to ensure that the film was historically accurate. Jake Jacobs and Andre Madness did the cinematography while Kylie Ireland and Andy Appleton were the art directors. Costume design was done by Brad Armstrong. Brendon Miller contributed a song, "On the Run", to the film.

== Reception ==
=== Critical response ===
AdultDVDTalk.com described the film as "an enormously lavish and beautiful production". The website keys in on the films elaborate and raunchy sex scenes and its filmography which it describes as "beautiful". The website gave the film a five out of five star overall rating. Another adult film reviewer called the film as "superb" and "fun". On the review aggregator The Movie DB the film holds a user score of 78% based on 162 reviews. As well as a 6.5 out of 10 stars on IMDb.

=== Awards and nominations ===
List of accolades received by Wanted
Awards & nominations
| Award | Won | Nominated |
| AVN Awards | 2 | 9 |
| NightMoves Awards | 1 | 0 |
| XBIZ Awards | 5 | 12 |
| XRCO Awards | 1 | 1 |
- Total number of wins and nominations
| Totals | 9 | 22 |

AVN Awards
| Year | Result | Award | Recipient(s) |
|---|---|---|---|
| 2016 | Nominated | Best Actress | Stormy Daniels |
| 2016 | Nominated | Best Director – Feature | Stormy Daniels |
| 2016 | Nominated | Best Screenplay | Stormy Daniels |
| 2016 | Nominated | Best Art Direction | —N/a |
| 2016 | Nominated | Best Cinematography | Jake Jacobs |
| 2016 | Won | Best Drama | —N/a |
| 2016 | Nominated | Best Editing | Mrs. Braun, Axel Braun & Alex Sanders |
| 2016 | Nominated | Best Marketing Campaign – Individual Project | —N/a |
| 2016 | Won | Best Soundtrack | —N/a |
| 2016 | Nominated | Best Supporting Actor | Eric Masterson |
| 2016 | Nominated | Best Supporting Actress | Amber Rayne |

NightMoves Awards
| Year | Result | Award |
|---|---|---|
| 2015 | Won | First Choice |

XBIZ Awards
| Year | Result | Award | Recipient(s) |
|---|---|---|---|
| 2016 | Won | Feature Movie of the Year | —N/a |
| 2016 | Won | Director of the Year – Feature Release | Stormy Daniels |
| 2016 | Nominated | Best Actress – Feature Release | Stormy Daniels |
| 2016 | Nominated | Screenplay of the Year | Stormy Daniels |
| 2016 | Nominated | Best Actor – Feature Release | Brendon Miller |
| 2016 | Won | Best Actor – Feature Release | Steven St. Croix |
| 2016 | Nominated | Best Supporting Actress | Anikka Albrite |
| 2016 | Nominated | Best Supporting Actress | Amber Rayne |
| 2016 | Nominated | Best Supporting Actor | Eric Masterson |
| 2016 | Nominated | Best Sex Scene – Feature Release | Stormy Daniels & Brendon Miller |
| 2016 | Nominated | Best Sex Scene – Feature Release | Jodi Taylor & Eric Masterson |
| 2016 | Nominated | Best Cinematography | Jake Jacobs |
| 2016 | Won | Best Art Direction | —N/a |
| 2016 | Nominated | Best Special Effects | —N/a |
| 2016 | Won | Best Music | —N/a |
| 2016 | Nominated | Best Editing | Mrs. Braun, Axel Braun & Alex Sanders |
| 2016 | Nominated | Marketing Campaign of the Year | —N/a |

XRCO Awards
| Year | Result | Award | Recipient(s) |
|---|---|---|---|
| 2016 | Won | Best Epic | —N/a |
| 2016 | Nominated | Best Actress | Stormy Daniels |
