= Jacky St. James =

American pornographic film director and writer

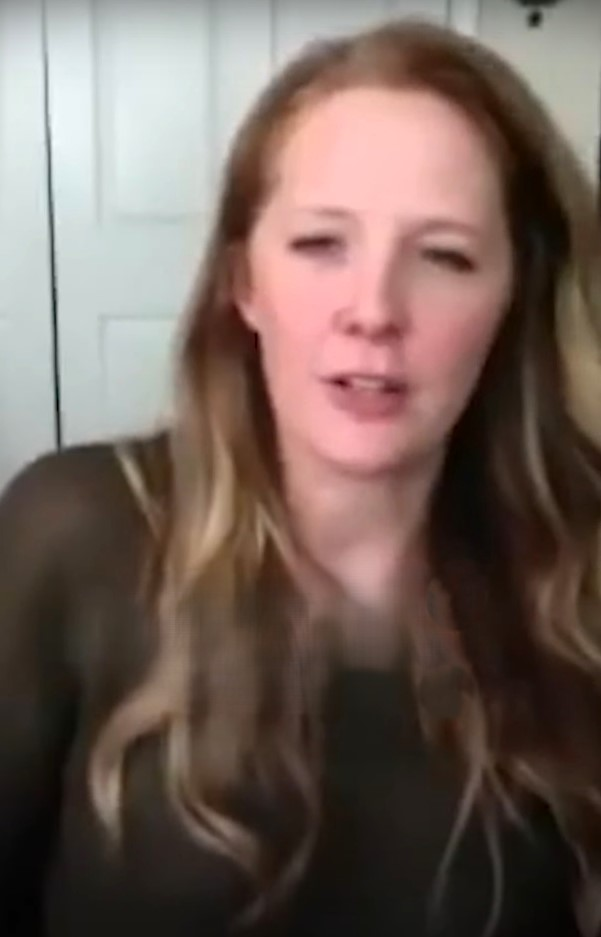
- St. James in 2021
- Born: October 15, 1976 (age 50); Virginia, U.S.
- Website: jackystjames.com

Jacky St. James (born October 15, 1976) is an American pornographic film director, screenwriter and publicist for the studio New Sensations. She also directs for Bellesa Films.

== Early life ==
St. James grew up within the Washington metropolitan area in Northern Virginia. She was raised Catholic.

St. James has a Bachelor of Arts degree in Theatre with a concentration in Film. At age 27, she moved to Los Angeles to pursue a career in the mainstream entertainment industry. She worked as an actress in films and television shows and has directed small mainstream projects as well. She also worked in online advertising for over 13 years.

== Career ==
In May 2010, a friend of St. James, who is a director of photography, sent her a clip of The Wedding Day from the New Sensations Romance Series because he was impressed by the quality of the film. After researching The Romance Series, she discovered that New Sensations was doing a writing contest for the series. Adult film director Eddie Powell gave her advice on how to write a porn script after she contacted him on Twitter. She entered the contest in 2011 and her script, Dear Abby, won. Powell directed the film and New Sensations released it in June 2011. St. James also won Best Screenplay for the film at the 2012 AVN Awards.

Some of St. James's most notable works are Torn, The Temptation of Eve, and The Submission of Emma Marx (including three sequels). She co-directed Torn with Eddie Powell and it won the AVN Award for Best Romance Release in 2013, the year in which the category was first created. In 2014, The Temptation of Eve and The Submission of Emma Marx won AVN Awards for Best Romance Movie and Best BDSM Movie, respectively. That same year, St. James began to direct mostly for Digital Sin's Tabu Tales, a line with plots featuring sex between stepfamily members. In 2014, she became only the second woman after Stormy Daniels to win an XRCO Award as Best Director (Feature), an honor she could retain in the following two years. In 2015 and 2016, she also received the XBIZ Award for Director of the Year – Body of Work. The 2015 sequel The Submission of Emma Marx 2: Boundaries won her two more screenplay awards, an AVN and XBIZ Award. In 2016, she co-created a Showtime erotic series, Submission with Paul Fishbein. Since 2019, Jacky St. James has been also directing movies for site Bellesa Films, including their imprint Bellesa House.

== Awards and nominations ==
List of accolades received by Jacky St. James
Awards & nominations
| Award | Won | Nominated |
| AVN Awards | 3 | 12 |
| NightMoves Awards | 1 | 1 |
| XBIZ Awards | 6 | 12 |
| XRCO Awards | 2 | 0 |
- Total number of wins and nominations
| Totals | 12 | 25 |

AVN Awards
| Year | Result | Award | Film |
|---|---|---|---|
| 2012 | Won | Best Screenplay | Dear Abby |
| 2013 | Nominated | Best Director – Feature (shared with Eddie Powell) | Torn |
| 2013 | Nominated | Best Screenplay | Torn |
| 2013 | Nominated | Best Director – Non-Feature | Power & Control |
| 2013 | Won | Game Changer | —N/a |
| 2014 | Nominated | Best Director – Feature (shared with Eddie Powell) | The Submission of Emma Marx |
| 2014 | Nominated | Best Director – Feature | The Temptation of Eve |
| 2014 | Nominated | Best Screenplay | The Temptation of Eve |
| 2015 | Nominated | Best Director – Feature (shared with Eddie Powell) | Second Chances |
| 2015 | Nominated | Best Screenplay | Second Chances |
| 2015 | Nominated | Best Director – Non-Feature | Keep It in the Family |
| 2015 | Nominated | Director of the Year | —N/a |
| 2016 | Nominated | Best Director - Feature | The Submission of Emma Marx 2: Boundaries |
| 2016 | Won | Best Screenplay | The Submission of Emma Marx 2: Boundaries |
| 2016 | Nominated | Director of the Year | —N/a |

NightMoves Awards
| Year | Result | Award |
|---|---|---|
| 2014 | Won | Best Director – Feature (Editor's Choice) |
| 2015 | Nominated | Best Director (Feature Films) |

XBIZ Awards
| Year | Result | Award | Film |
|---|---|---|---|
| 2012 | Nominated | Screenplay of the Year | Dear Abby |
| 2013 | Nominated | Director of the Year - Feature Release (shared with Eddie Powell) | Torn |
| 2013 | Won | Screenplay of the Year | Torn |
| 2013 | Nominated | Best Non-Sex Acting Performance | Love, Marriage & Other Bad Ideas |
| 2014 | Nominated | Director of the Year - Feature Release (shared with Eddie Powell) | The Submission of Emma Marx |
| 2014 | Nominated | Screenplay of the Year | The Submission of Emma Marx |
| 2014 | Nominated | Director of the Year - Feature Release | The Temptation of Eve |
| 2014 | Won | Screenplay of the Year | The Temptation of Eve |
| 2015 | Won | Director of the Year - Body of Work | —N/a |
| 2015 | Nominated | Director of the Year - Feature Release (shared with Eddie Powell) | Second Chances |
| 2015 | Won | Best Non-Sex Acting Performance | Second Chances |
| 2015 | Nominated | Screenplay of the Year | Second Chances |
| 2015 | Nominated | Director of the Year - Feature Release | The Sexual Liberation of Anna Lee |
| 2015 | Nominated | Screenplay of the Year | The Sexual Liberation of Anna Lee |
| 2016 | Won | Director of the Year – Body of Work | —N/a |
| 2016 | Nominated | Director of the Year – Feature Release | The Submission of Emma Marx 2: Boundaries |
| 2016 | Won | Screenplay of the Year | The Submission of Emma Marx 2: Boundaries |
| 2016 | Nominated | Director of the Year – Non-Feature Release | A Hotwife Blindfolded 2 |

XRCO Awards
| Year | Result | Award |
|---|---|---|
| 2014 | Won | Best Director (Features) |
| 2015 | Won | Best Director (Features) |
| 2016 | Won | Best Director (Features) |
