= The Bull & Bear =

Student magazine of McGill University, Canada

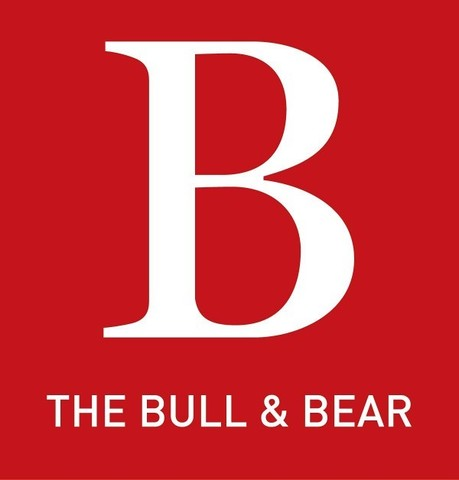
- Type: Student publication
- Format: Magazine
- Owner: Management Undergraduate Society
- Managing editor: Rishi Kohli
- Founded: 2003; 23 years ago
- Headquarters: 1001, rue Sherbrooke Ouest; Suite 228; Montreal, Quebec; H3A 1G5
- Website: www.bullandbearmcgill.com

The Bull & Bear is a student-run magazine at McGill University. Founded in 2003, the magazine was initially conceived as a platform for the voice of students in the Desautels Faculty of Management. In 2012, the magazine widened its scope to include McGill affairs and Montreal-wide news, and it is today considered a general undergraduate news magazine. The Bull & Bear publishes articles online on a rolling basis, and it prints one issue per semester.

Today, The Bull & Bear publishes articles in four sections: News, Arts & Culture, Opinion, and Business & Economy. It also publishes a weekly podcast on campus affairs named Office Hours and provides media services for McGill clubs and Montreal-based organizations.

== Organizational structure ==
The Bull & Bear is made up of approximately 75 staff members who work on a volunteer basis. The publication is composed of five sections: News, Opinion, Arts and Culture, Business and Technology, and, as of fall 2020, Sports. The publication is led by the executive editor and one to two managing editors. The editorial board, which oversees the direction of editorial activities, is composed of the executive editor, managing editor(s), and 10 section editors.

== Operations ==
The Bull & Bear operates within McGill's Management Undergraduate Society (MUS). As such, the MUS receives all revenues earned by The Bull & Bear, and pays for all expenses incurred by The Bull & Bear. Unlike most Canadian student publications, there is no dedicated student fee levy for the publication: however, all undergraduate management students pay a semesterly fee levy to the MUS, and the society uses part of this levy to provide ongoing financial support to all of its organizations. The Bull & Bear submits a budget to the MUS at the beginning of each academic year, including projected revenues and expenses, which are then approved by the MUS. The publication's revenues are generally received from advertising, sponsorship, and photography services. Expenses may include issue printing, web hosting, and branded materials.

== See also ==
- Desautels Faculty of Management
- McGill University
- List of newspapers in Canada
