= Flash Brown =

American pornographic actor (born 1981)

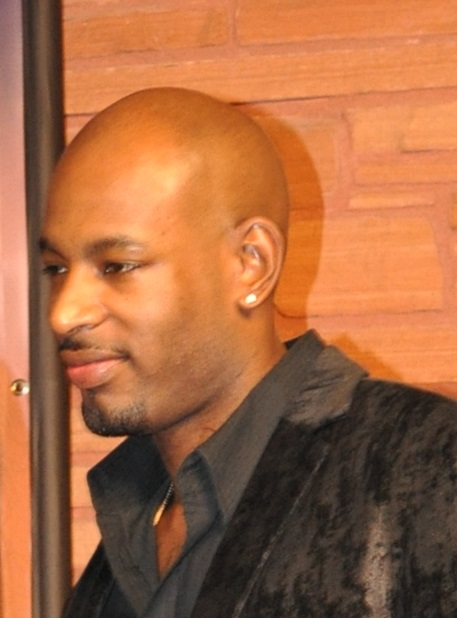
- Brown at the 2011 AVN Awards
- Born: January 17, 1981 (age 45); Memphis, Tennessee, U.S.
- Other name: Flash Murrow
- Height: 6 ft 6 in (1.98 m)

Flash Brown (born January 17, 1981) is the stage name of an American pornographic actor, model, and former professional basketball player. In his early adult career, he received both the Urban X Award for Best Male Newcomer and the XBIZ Awards for New Male Performer of the Year. In 2015, Brown became the first ever contract star for the adult interracial sex website Blacked. He later received the 2018 Urban X Award for Male Performer of the Year.

== Early life ==
Brown was born and raised in Memphis, Tennessee. He played basketball in high school and was a part of the Amateur Athletic Union. Brown continued to play basketball in college, where he earned the nickname "Flash" for his agility on the court. Brown graduated from college with a degree in General Education. After college, he played professionally overseas in both Ireland and China, as well as semi-professionally in Birmingham, Alabama and in Memphis and Nashville, Tennessee.

== Career ==
While working as a model, Brown was approached by a photographer who suggested he perform in pornographic videos. He chose his stage name "Flash Brown" by combining his nickname "Flash" with "Brown", a shortened version of his actual surname. Brown began performing in the adult film industry in November 2009. Brown's first performance was an interracial scene for the production company DogFart. The following year, Brown received the Urban X Award for Best Male Newcomer.

In April 2011, Brown partnered with Shinefish Films to launch his own pornographic film studio, Flash Brown Productions. Later that year he received the XBIZ Award for New Male Performer of the Year. In February 2015, Brown signed the first ever exclusive performing contract with Blacked. He renewed his contract the following year. In 2019, Brown received the Urban X Award for Porn Star of the Year.

== Personal life ==
In January 2019 adult film website MikeSouth.com reported that Brown was arrested on counts of corporal injury to a spouse, one count of pimping and pandering, one count of revenge porn, and three counts of contempt of court, for violations of a previous arrest for domestic violence. Brown was charged in March 2019 & was placed on 5 years probation on October of that year.

== Awards and nominations ==
List of awards and nominations received by Flash Brown
Awards and nominations
Award	Won	Nominated
AVN Awards	2	5
Urban X Awards	2	4
XBIZ Awards	1	0
XRCO Awards	0	2
- Total number of wins and nominations
Totals	5	11

AVN Awards
Year	Nominated work and artist	Category	Result	Ref.
2011	Flash Brown	Best Male Newcomer	Nominated	
2014	Flash Brown	Unsung Male Performer of the Year	Nominated	
2016	Carter Cruise Obsession	Best Anal Sex Scene	Nominated	
2016	Carter Cruise Obsession	Best Three-Way Sex Scene	Won	
2016	Black & White 4	Best Boy/Girl Sex Scene	Won	
2016	Flash Brown	Male Performer of the Year	Nominated	
2017	Interracial Orgies	Best Group Sex Scene	Nominated	

Urban X Awards
Year	Nominated work and artist	Category	Result	Ref.
2010	Flash Brown	Best Male Newcomer	Won	
2012	Black in My Ass	Best Anal Sex Scene	Nominated	
2012	A Touch of Seduction	Best Couples Sex Scene	Nominated	
2012	Flash Brown	Male Performer of the Year	Nominated	
2017	Flash Brown	Best Male Performer	Nominated	
2018	Flash Brown	Porn Star of the Year	Won	

XBIZ Awards
Year	Nominated work and artist	Category	Result	Ref.
2011	Flash Brown	New Male Performer of the Year	Won	

XRCO Awards
Year	Nominated work and artist	Category	Result	Ref.
2011	Flash Brown	New Stud	Nominated	
2016	Flash Brown	Male Performer of the Year	Nominated	
