= Shannon family =

American family known for various reality television shows

- Origin: McIntyre, Georgia, U.S.
- Members: June Stroud (b. 1979); Anna Toney (1994–2023); Jessica Shannon (b. 1996); Lauryn Shannon (b. 2000); Alana Thompson (b. 2005)

The Shannon family is an American family whose members are best known for their involvement in reality television. The family first appeared on reality television in 2011, when June "Mama June" Shannon and her then-six-year-old daughter, Alana "Honey Boo Boo" Thompson, appeared on the TLC series, Toddlers & Tiaras. The family then got its own spin-off show in 2012 on TLC, Here Comes Honey Boo Boo. After its cancellation, a spin-off series Mama June: From Not to Hot premiered in 2017 on We TV. It has since been rebranded Mama June: Road to Redemption and Mama June: Family Crisis.

== Family history ==
In 2011, after discovering Alana's victories within the children's beauty pageant circuit coupled with her outgoing personality and humor, she and her mother, June, became regulars on Toddlers & Tiaras, their success led to a spin-off reality series, Here Comes Honey Boo Boo, which premiered in 2012, and initially ran for six weeks. It featured Alana's older half-sisters, Anna, Jessica, and Lauryn ("Pumpkin") as well as her father Mike, known as Sugar Bear, and other extended family members at home in rural McIntyre, Georgia.

The show was criticized and was called by some critics as "hicksploitation" for making fun of white, rural Southern culture. Nevertheless, the success of the show led to holiday specials on Halloween, Thanksgiving, and Christmas of 2012 and a new 12-week season in 2013. In October 2014, TLC cancelled the show just months before a fifth season was due to air. The cancellation came a day after TMZ reported that June was dating her former boyfriend, who had spent time in prison for sexually molesting a young girl, who turned out to be one of her daughters.

In 2017, the family received another television series on We TV with Mama June: From Not to Hot, which chronicled June's weight loss following bariatric surgery and extensive plastic surgeries on her face and body. The show was later rebranded as Mama June: Road to Redemption and Mama June: Family Crisis after June's drug addiction, arrest, rehab, sobriety, marriage and reconciliation with her daughters. The sixth season covers Alana's high-school graduation and her oldest sister Anna's death at 29.

== The Shannons ==
=== June Shannon ===
June Elizabeth "Mama June" Stroud (née Shannon; born August 10, 1979) is the matriarch of the Shannon family, the mother of Anna, Jessica, Lauryn, and Alana. She was born in McIntyre, Georgia to Sandra Hundley and Marvin Shannon, who divorced when she was two. She has three siblings: Joanne "Doe Doe" Shannon, Joanie Shannon (now McDonald) and James Edward Shannon; and two half-sisters, Michelle Shannon and Nicole Shannon. Due to childhood cataracts that went untreated, June is legally blind. At only 14, June became pregnant by her ex-boyfriend David Dunn; she gave birth to daughter Anna just days after her 15th birthday. She quit school when she became pregnant, but she later earned her GED. June pursued relationships with men who would later become convicted sex offenders; her daughters Jessica and Lauryn were fathered by Michael Anthony Ford (b. 1977), who was found guilty of trying to obtain oral sex from a minor female online; and she briefly dated Mark McDaniel, who was convicted of abusing Anna and whom Lauryn believed to be her biological father for some time. Her youngest daughter, Alana, was born in 2005, fathered by Mike Thompson, from whom June split in 2014.

Alongside Lauryn, June came out as bisexual in 2015. She stated she had been intimate with women but had never been in a relationship with one.

June then entered a relationship with Eugene "Geno" Doak. Doak has a criminal record, having served jail time for burglary, theft, and criminal damage to property. In March 2019, June and Doak were both arrested for felony drug possession in Alabama. The two later attended rehab before eventually splitting in 2021. June cited his abuse and relapse as reasons.

In 2021, she began dating former drug addict and convicted felon Justin Stroud. The two married in a Georgia civil ceremony in March 2022 after dating for six months. After continued sobriety, they had a beach wedding in Florida with their families present in February 2023. It is her second marriage.

==== Weight journey ====
As an adult, June struggled with being morbidly obese, weighing 460 pounds (210 kg) at her heaviest. She subsequently underwent bariatric surgery, having part of her stomach removed as part of a sleeve gastrectomy, in 2016 and reportedly lost more than 300 pounds (140 kg) thanks to the surgery as well as the help of dieting and personal trainer, Kenya Crooks. In addition to her significant weight loss, she underwent cosmetic surgery, spending a reported $75,000 to further alter her appearance.

=== Anna Toney ===
Anna Marie "Chickadee" Toney (née Shannon; August 28, 1994 – December 9, 2023) was the eldest of June's four children; her father is David Dunn. Because June was so young when Anna was born, having just turned 15 before she gave birth, she initially considered placing Anna for adoption by her aunt and uncle, Janice and James Shannon, but the paperwork was never finalized and Anna ultimately ended up being raised by her maternal grandmother, Sandra. While in June's custody, Anna was sexually abused by June's then-boyfriend, Mark McDaniel, who was later convicted for his crimes. Like her mother, Anna became pregnant as a teenager and gave birth to her first child, daughter Kaitlyn Elizabeth, in 2012. Kaitlyn has the surname Clark after Anna's longtime boyfriend Caleb Clark, but Anna never publicly named Kaitlyn's father; she only said that they had not spoken since Kaitlyn was two months old and that he was engaged with two children. She and Clark eventually split and Anna went on to marry Michael Cardwell (b. 1992). The two married on May 25, 2014, and moved to Alabama, where their daughter Kylee Madison was born in 2015. Anna and Michael separated in 2017 and Anna returned to Georgia with her two children.

Anna had a strained relationship with June, as June defended McDaniel in regards to accusations that he sexually assaulted her and reportedly began dating McDaniel again in 2014. Additionally, Anna alleged that June had stolen thousands out of her trust fund, leaving her with less than $18 in her savings account. During the time Anna involved lawyers in an effort to gain access to her accounts, which were managed by June, she took to social media in an effort to make money selling products that claimed to prevent Ebola, in the midst of the Ebola epidemic in the United States, which subjected her to backlash.

In January 2023, she was diagnosed with stage 4 adrenal cancer, which later became terminal. In March 2023, she married her long-time boyfriend, Eldridge Toney. After four rounds of chemotherapy, she died on December 9, 2023, at her mother's home.

=== Jessica Shannon ===
Jessica Louise "Chubbs" Shannon (born October 12, 1996) is June's second daughter; her father is Michael Anthony Ford. When the family moved from McIntyre, Georgia to Hampton, Georgia, 17-year-old Jessica did not accompany them, as she had less than three months until her high school graduation. She was the first member of the family to graduate high school and attend college. Jessica is a lesbian and is in a relationship with Shyann McCant. Shyann, who first appeared on a May 2023 episode of Mama June: Family Crisis, is six years younger than Jessica. Jessica and Shyann got married in the Season 8 finale in May 2026. On July 24, 2026, Jessica and Shyann filed for divorce.

=== Lauryn Shannon ===
Lauryn Mychelle "Pumpkin" Shannon (born January 7, 2000) is June's third daughter. Lauryn was raised believing her father was Mark McDaniel, a former partner of June's who sexually abused Anna, who was never convicted for this but was convicted of molesting another child. June has admitted that she is not sure who Lauryn's biological father is. At the age of six, Lauryn was struck by lightning. Lauryn came out as bisexual alongside June in 2015.

As a teenager, Lauryn began dating Joshua Efird. At age 17, she gave birth to daughter Ella Grace Efird. In 2018, she stated that she wished she would have waited until she was older to have children and that it had not been her intention to become a teen mother. Lauryn and Joshua married in April 2018 in Las Vegas, Nevada. She later gave birth to son Bentley Jameson in June 2021. In May 2022, she gave birth to twins, a boy named Sylus Ray and a girl named Stella Renae. On August 1, 2024, Lauryn and Joshua filed for divorce.

After June's arrest in 2019, Lauryn took in Alana and obtained temporary custody. She was granted full custody in June 2022.

=== Alana Thompson ===
Alana Frances "Honey Boo Boo" Thompson (born August 28, 2005) is the fourth and youngest of June's daughters; her father is June's former longtime partner Mike "Sugar Bear" Thompson. Alana began to compete in beauty pageants at a young age, in which she appeared on several episodes on the TLC television show Toddlers & Tiaras, which gave viewers a behind-the-scenes look at the world of children's pageantry. A popular member of the cast, she and her family were given their own show, Here Comes Honey Boo Boo, which was ultimately cancelled due to her mother's association with sex offender Mark McDaniel. Alana also appeared in Mama June: From Not to Hot. In 2018, she performed in the lone season of ABC's Dancing with the Stars: Juniors, paired with Tristan Ianiero and mentored by Artem Chigvintsev. TMZ reported that Alana was paid $50,000 to appear on the show and would earn an additional $80,000 if she remained on the show for the entirety of the season and competed in the finale episode. She was eliminated in the fourth week. In 2021, she appeared with June on The Masked Singer. Disguised as a beach ball, she was eliminated in the first round after singing Miley Cyrus' "Party in the U.S.A."

After June's March 2019 arrest, Alana lived with half-sister Lauryn. Lauryn was given legal guardianship of Alana until she turned 18. After graduating from high school in Georgia in May 2023, she moved to Denver, Colorado with her boyfriend, Dralin Carswell. She currently attends Regis University for a degree in nursing.

In May 2025, Thompson appeared on the Lifetime documentary film I Was Honey Boo Boo.

=== Kaitlyn Shannon ===
Kaitlyn Elizabeth Shannon (born July 26, 2012) is the elder of Anna's two daughters, born to Anna when she was 17 years old. Her birth was featured on season one of Here Comes Honey Boo Boo. Though Anna's high-school sweetheart, Caleb Clark, whom she dated for two years, has said he believes himself to be Kaitlyn's father, Anna and her family expressed doubts, as she had been intimately involved with a second man around the time she became pregnant. Neither Caleb nor the other man appear to publicly have a relationship with Kaitlyn and, after Anna married Michael Cardwell, Kaitlyn reportedly began calling her stepfather "Daddy." Her half-sister Kylee was born when she was 3 years old. Kaitlyn was born with polydactyly, sporting a second thumb on her right hand; she later underwent surgery to remove her extra thumb, amidst Anna's concerns that her daughter would be bullied for her condition. After her mother and stepfather separated in 2017, Kaitlyn moved with her mother and half-sister from Alabama, where she had been living since the age of 2, to Georgia. She now lives with grandmother June and step-grandfather Justin following the death of her mother Anna.

=== Kylee Cardwell ===
Kylee Madison Cardwell (born December 9, 2015) is Anna's younger daughter, born to her and her then-husband Michael Cardwell when she was 21 years old. Her middle name, Madison, honors her paternal grandmother. She now lives with father Michael following the death of her mother Anna.

=== Ella Grace Efird ===
Ella Grace Efird (born December 8, 2017) is Lauryn's eldest child; Lauryn was 17 when she gave birth to Ella. Her family currently maintains an Instagram account for her, which had 92,600 followers as of May 2020. Her parents married in 2018, when she was 4 months old.

=== Bentley Jameson Efird ===
Bentley Jameson Efird (born July 21, 2021) is the second addition to the Efird family.

=== Sylus and Stella Efird ===
Sylus Ray Efird and Stella Renae Efird (born May 19, 2022) are the twin children of Lauryn and Joshua as well as the third and fourth additions to the Efird family. They were born just eleven months after brother Bentley.

== Associates of the Shannons ==
=== Mike Thompson ===
Mike "Sugar Bear" Thompson (born 1971) is June's ex-partner and Alana's father. He later married and divorced Jennifer Lamb. Mike later revealed he had been unfaithful to June, having cheated on her with both women and men during the course of their relationship, on an episode of Marriage Boot Camp: Reality Stars. Jennifer expressed she had doubts as to whether Mike was the biological father of Alana and, without Mike's knowledge, submitted his DNA for a paternity test; the results were inconclusive, with the report saying the samples submitted had been corrupted. Mike told the press that after he and June separated, she had been keeping Alana from seeing him.

=== Jennifer Lamb ===
Jennifer Lamb is the ex-wife of Mike Thompson. She was previously married to Raymond Lamb, Jr., a former truck driver and convicted sex offender. She married Lamb in 1994 and in 2014, he was convicted of sexually abusing a minor; he is currently serving a 35-year sentence at Wheeler Correctional Facility. It was reported that Jennifer was considering weight loss surgery, as her obesity was causing her mobility issues, but said that she was hesitant to undergo the surgery for fear her husband would leave her if she did, as Mike prefers larger women. She ultimately lost a substantial amount of weight and in 2019, Mike proposed to her a second time with a new diamond wedding ring. They later divorced.

=== Lee Thompson ===
Lee "Uncle Poodle" Thompson is Mike's brother, Alana's paternal uncle. He is openly gay and HIV-positive. He suffered from heart trouble in 2015, leading him to incur $150,000 in hospital bills.

=== Michael Ford ===
Michael Anthony Ford (born 1977) is the father of Jessica. He was convicted of sexual exploitation of a minor, after attempting to solicit oral sex from an undercover police officer he believed to be a teen girl. His arrest was featured on an episode of To Catch a Predator. Michael is currently incarcerated and ineligible for parole until 2026, after he was found to have violated his probation. He is currently at Graceville Correctional Facility.

=== Joshua Efird ===
Joshua Brandon "Josh" Efird is the ex-husband of Lauryn "Pumpkin" Efird, who is the daughter of Mama June Shannon (real name: June Shannon). They were married for six years and have four children together: Ella Grace Efird, Bentley Jameson Efird, and twins Sylus and Stella Efird. Lauryn also has sole custody of her younger sister, Alana "Honey Boo Boo" Thompson. Lauryn and Josh are currently going through a divorce, having separated in August 2024 and finalized in September 2024. Lauryn is now dating Darrin Kitchens, while Josh is reportedly living with another woman. He and his new girlfriend have one child together that was born in 2025.

=== Eugene "Geno" Doak ===
Eugene Edward "Geno" Doak (born October 8, 1975) is June's ex-boyfriend. The two began dating in 2017. Geno has a criminal history, including felony charges, for which he served time at Coastal State Prison. In 2009, he was admitted to a psychiatric facility following a suicide attempt. After being released from prison, Geno founded his own home improvement company, G&J Home Improvements, which is based in Griffin, Georgia. Additionally, he is divorced and has children of his own from previous relationships and the two previously dated for a brief time in 2015. He, along with June, was arrested in March 2019 for drug possession in Alabama. They later split in 2021, with June revealing she was victim to his abuse.

=== Justin Stroud ===
Justin Stroud (born September 9, 1988) is June's husband. They met through social media and married on March 23, 2022, at the Wilkinson County, Georgia, courthouse after dating for six months. They had a formal ceremony with their family in attendance on the beach in Panama City, Florida on February 18, 2023. He is a tattoo artist and auto mechanic. He refers to his mother as Mama Dukes. In November 2019, he was arrested in Alabama for possession of marijuana and drug paraphernalia, burglary and theft. He pleaded guilty to the latter two charges. He was arrested and spent a month in jail in 2022 after violating his probation.

=== Dralin Carswell ===
Dralin Carswell (born April 1, 2001) is Alana's boyfriend. They started dating officially when she was 16 and he was 19. In February 2023, he was arrested in Monroe County, Georgia for driving under the influence and fleeing from authorities. Alana, who was 17 at the time, was in the car but was not arrested. He was indicted on four counts, including giving a false name when arrested, in August 2023.

=== Mark McDaniel ===
Mark McDaniel (born 1961) is June's ex-partner and possibly the father of her third child, Lauryn. Mark pled guilty to aggravated child molestation in 2003, with June's eldest daughter, Anna, being his victim. June reportedly rekindled her relationship with Mark after his release from prison, resulting in the cancellation of Here Comes Honey Boo Boo, though June denied any wrongdoing.

== Television appearances ==
=== Toddlers & Tiaras ===
The Shannons were first introduced to U.S. audiences through their appearances on TLC's Toddlers & Tiaras. June and Alana first appeared together in an episode titled "Precious Moments Pageant 2011", which originally aired on January 4, 2012, though filming for the episode took place in 2011. The mother-daughter duo became regulars on the show, which gave viewers a behind-the-scenes look at the world of pageantry. Alana's outgoing personality and funny remarks made her a fan favorite and several of her phrases from the show, such as "A dollar makes me holler", later became the basis for popular internet memes. Audiences later expressed concern for Alana's health after it was revealed that June would give her daughter, then 6 years old, a mixture of soft drinks and energy drinks to give her enough energy to compete in pageants.

=== Here Comes Honey Boo Boo ===
Here Comes Honey Boo Boo premiered on TLC on August 8, 2012. It ran for four seasons and featured the family and their daily lives. In the middle of filming the fifth season, TLC abruptly cancelled the show after it was confirmed that June was dating a registered sex offender.

=== Dr. Phil ===
In December 2014, Anna appeared on an episode of Dr. Phil, alongside her grandmother, Sandra, to discuss the disappearance of money from her savings account, which June had access to, and the backlash she received as the result of endorsing products claiming to treat the Ebola virus and cancer.

=== The Doctors ===
In 2015, Alana and June appeared on an episode of The Doctors. They urged June to take control of Alana's weight, which had reached 125 pounds (57 kg), making Alana clinically obese.

=== Mama June: From Not to Hot/Mama June: Family Crisis ===
Mama June: From Not to Hot premiered on We TV on February 24, 2017. The show was later rebranded as Mama June: Road to Redemption and Mama June: Family Crisis.

=== Dancing with the Stars: Juniors ===
Alana appeared on Dancing with the Stars: Juniors, a spin-off of Dancing with the Stars that featured child stars and dancers. She was eliminated in the fourth week.

=== The Masked Singer ===
In 2021, Alana and June competed in season six of The Masked Singer as the wild card contestant "Beach Ball" which was the first contestant to have a double-sided head. Both faces were operated in the style of a puppet while its body was a vehicle with a hidden door on its body that they can enter and exit through. When eliminated and unmasked on week six where the character debuted, it was revealed that Alana operated the front face while June operated the back face. In addition, they had to put up with the heat inside and had to be careful not to accidentally drive "Beach Ball" off the stage. Due to her age at the time, Honey Boo Boo beat JoJo Siwa's record as the youngest contestant on the show.

== Controversies ==
=== Go-go juice ===
During their time on Toddlers & Tiaras, June was filmed giving Alana, who was 6 years old at the time, a drink she referred to as "go-go juice". It was later revealed that the go-go juice she had Alana consume before pageants was a mixture of Red Bull, an energy drink, and Mountain Dew, a carbonated beverage high in caffeine, sugar, and calories. Experts estimated that one serving of go-go juice contains as much caffeine as two cups of coffee, a worrisome amount considering that the American Academy of Pediatrics recommends children under the age of 12 not consume caffeine at all. June defended her decision to give the Red Bull–Mountain Dew mixture to Alana, saying that there were worse things she could give her daughter to drink, such as alcohol, and that she had tried alternatives, notably Pixy Stix, which are referred to as "pageant crack" within the pageant community due to the energizing effects the high sugar content has on a child contestant's behavior.

=== June's relationship with a sex offender ===
At the height of the family's popularity and in the middle of filming what would be the last season of Here Comes Honey Boo Boo, June was rumored by tabloids to have rekindled her relationship with her ex-boyfriend, convicted sex offender Mark McDaniel. To make matters worse, Anna revealed to the media that Mark had sexually abused her and that after police began their investigation into Anna's claims, June did not believe her. The scandal ultimately resulted in TLC canceling the show.

=== June's substance use ===
On March 13, 2019, June Shannon and her boyfriend, Geno Doak, were both arrested at a gas station in Alabama, after police were called to the scene following reports of a public dispute. Both June and Geno were arrested and charged with possession of a controlled substance, reportedly crack cocaine, and possession of drug paraphernalia, with a glass pipe found on June and a hypodermic needle found on Geno. Geno also faced an additional charge of domestic violence and harassment in relation to the public altercation with June. The two were indicted on felony charges related to drug possession and Doak with third-degree domestic violence on September 13, 2019, though later reports do not mention a needle being found in Geno's possession, only the pipe, which June reportedly told police belonged to her. The two failed to show for their indictment, but later, in October 2019, entered a plea of not guilty, and face the possibility of prison time, if convicted. June's family reportedly staged an intervention and were able to convince June to enter a drug rehabilitation program in North Carolina several days prior to her arrest in Alabama, though she stayed in the program just twelve hours before leaving the program herself. After her arrest, her daughter Lauryn obtained custody of Alana and began raising her.

=== Alana accuses June of misappropriating her money ===
On a March 2024 episode of Mama June: Family Crisis, Alana discovered that her mother has not banked Alana's entire earnings from her 2018 Dancing with the Stars: Juniors and 2021 Masked Singer performances. California, where the shows were taped, has a law known as the Coogan Act, which mandates that a portion of child actors' pay must be put into a blocked trust account. As Alana prepared for college, she said she expected that the account would be holding at least $100,000, but it only held $33,000. June acknowledged that she has spent just about all of the girls' earnings over the years on drugs, vacations and household necessities. Georgia, where the original Honey Boo Boo show was filmed, does not have a Coogan Act, and June said she never put her daughters' earnings into any kind of savings account on their behalf.
