= Little Miss Atlanta =

2016 Reality television series on TLC

- Starring: Jasmine Crowe and Kim Anderson
- Country of origin: United States
- Original language: English
- No. of seasons: 1
- No. of episodes: 4

Production
- Production location: Atlanta
- Running time: 42 minutes
- Production company: Intuitive Entertainment

Original release
- Network: TLC
- Release: October 5 – November 2, 2016

Related
- Toddlers and Tiaras

Little Miss Atlanta is an American reality television series which aired on TLC in 2016. A spin-off of Toddlers and Tiaras, it profiles contestants in the Little Miss Black US Pageant system, based in Atlanta, Georgia. Each episode features three young African-American girls and their mothers as they compete in one of the system's pageants.

== Episodes ==
No. overall	No. in season	Title	Original release date
1	1	"Southern Belles & Mama Drama"	October 5, 2016
2	2	"Leave It On The Floor"	October 12, 2016
3	3	"Eat, Sleep, "BLEEP", Pageants!"	October 26, 2016
4	4	"Pageant Dad Duel"	November 2, 2016
