= Toddlers & Tiaras =

American reality television series

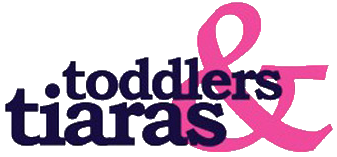
- Genre: Reality
- Country of origin: United States
- Original language: English
- No. of seasons: 7
- No. of episodes: 120 (list of episodes)

Production
- Running time: 40–45 minutes
- Production company: Authentic Entertainment

Original release
- Network: TLC
- Release: January 27, 2009 – November 23, 2016

Related
- Eden's World; Here Comes Honey Boo Boo; Cheer Perfection; Mama June: From Not to Hot; Little Miss Atlanta

Toddlers & Tiaras (known as Another Toddlers & Tiaras in season 7) is an American reality television series that aired on TLC from January 27, 2009, to October 16, 2013. After a three-year hiatus due to much controversy, a sequel series premiered on August 24, 2016. The show follows the personal lives of families of contestants in a child beauty pageant. Like many shows about children pageants, it generated controversy for dressing the children provocatively. The show led to other reality show spin-offs: Eden's World, Here Comes Honey Boo Boo, and Cheer Perfection. On November 24, 2016, TLC cancelled the series after its 7th season finale.

== Episodes ==
Season	Episodes	Originally released	
Season	Episodes	First released	Last released
1	9	January 27, 2009	April 14, 2009
2	18	July 22, 2009	February 17, 2010
3	18	June 2, 2010	February 23, 2011
4	18	June 15, 2011	December 28, 2011
5	31	January 4, 2012	February 6, 2013
6	13	June 5, 2013	October 16, 2013
7	13	August 24, 2016	November 23, 2016

== Controversy ==
In an August 2012 custody hearing surrounding a child participant on the show, a court-appointed psychologist said, "Children adorned with pageantry identities are not 'playing' or 'pretending.' Instead, they are trained to closely resemble their adult counterparts." One mother on the show was criticized for padding her daughter's chest to resemble Dolly Parton's and another was criticized for asking her daughter to smoke fake cigarettes on stage.

== Spin-offs ==
A spin-off series, Eden's World, began in March 2012 and focused on Eden Wood, her family, and her manager. In the show, Wood helped other girls to compete in pageants. The show was canceled a few months later.

Here Comes Honey Boo Boo, a second spin-off, starring Alana "Honey Boo Boo" Thompson and her family began on August 8, 2012. The series was a reality show depicting contestant Honey Boo Boo, her parents, and her older sisters going about their lives outside of pageants. The show was canceled in 2014, after Thompson's mother was found to be in a relationship with a convicted sex offender.

Another spin-off, Cheer Perfection, began on December 21, 2012. The series features several of the children and their families from episodes of Toddlers & Tiaras. This reality series focuses on their cheer club Cheer Time Revolution and the drama with the mothers around the gym.

A fourth spin-off, Little Miss Atlanta, aired in 2016. This series followed contestants in the Little Miss Black US Pageant.

== See also ==
- Child beauty pageant
- Beauty pageant
