= Cheer Perfection =

American reality television series

- Genre: Reality
- Country of origin: United States
- Original language: English
- No. of seasons: 2
- No. of episodes: 16

Production
- Executive producers: Lauren Lexton; Michael Gara; Tom Rogan
- Running time: 40–42 minutes
- Production company: Authentic Entertainment

Original release
- Network: TLC
- Release: December 19, 2012 – October 16, 2013

Cheer Perfection is an American reality television series that debuted on December 19, 2012, on TLC. TLC announced on February 6, 2013, that it had ordered an eight-episode second season, which premiered on August 28, 2013. Alisha Dunlap, Cassadee, R.D. Dunlap, Bonnie Crow, Alana, Ann Robinson, Torann and Robinson's husband Torey originally appeared on Toddlers & Tiaras. Dunlap owns Perfection Studios, which appeared in episodes of Toddlers & Tiaras.

After Andrea Clevenger, who appeared on Cheer Perfection, was arrested on charges relating to rape of a 13-year-old boy, TLC released a statement that the show had already been canceled and no repeats will be aired.

== Synopsis ==
Cheer Perfection follows a group of young cheerleaders at Cheer Time Revolution, located in Sherwood, Arkansas, as they endure the world of competitive cheerleading.

== Episodes ==
=== Series overview ===
Season	Episodes	Originally released	
Season	Episodes	First released	Last released
1	8	December 19, 2012	February 6, 2013
2	8	August 28, 2013	October 16, 2013

=== Season 1 (2012–13) ===
No. overall	No. in season	Title	Original release date	U.S. viewers (millions)
0	0	"Pilot"	July 11, 2012	1.10
1	1	"Failure Is Not An Option"	December 19, 2012	1.07
2	2	"Let's Just Hug it Out?"	December 26, 2012	1.30
3	3	"Too Bad, So Sad"	January 2, 2013	1.20
4	4	"We're All a Little Bit Crazy"	January 9, 2013	0.85
5	5	"Just Like Junior High"	January 16, 2013	0.91
6	6	"Keep My Name Out of Your Mouth"	January 23, 2013	0.87
7	7	"Call Me Madam President"	January 30, 2013	0.96
8	8	"Friendless Ann?"	February 6, 2013	0.77

=== Season 2 (2013) ===
No. overall	No. in season	Title	Original release date	U.S. viewers (millions)
9	1	"With Success, Comes Pressure..."	August 28, 2013	0.80
10	2	"Do What You Gotta Do To Win"	September 4, 2013	0.93
11	3	"Learning to Trust"	September 11, 2013	1.22
12	4	"Enter Coach James"	September 18, 2013	0.79
13	5	"I Got That Magic Pee"	September 25, 2013	0.90
14	6	"Watch Your Step"	October 2, 2013	0.70
15	7	"The Eyes and Ears of the Gym"	October 9, 2013	0.56
16	8	"The U.S. Finals"	October 16, 2013	1.02

== Reception ==
David Hinckley of New York Daily News said the parents are not an endearing bunch. Brian Lowry of Variety said the show is not original. Verne Gay of Newsday said the show is dull, trivial and never, ever outrageous. Melissa Camacho of Common Sense Media gave the show 2 stars out of 5.
