= The Masked Singer (American TV series) season 6 =

The Masked Singer
- Season 6
- Promotional poster for season six, featuring "Queen of Hearts", "Dalmatian", "Hamster", "Cupcake", and "Mallard"
- Starring: Robin Thicke; Jenny McCarthy Wahlberg; Ken Jeong; Nicole Scherzinger
- Hosted by: Nick Cannon
- No. of contestants: 16
- Winner: Jewel as "Queen of Hearts"
- Runner-up: Todrick Hall as "Bull"
- No. of episodes: 16

Release
- Original network: Fox
- Original release: September 22 – December 15, 2021

Season chronology
- ← Previous; Season 5 Next → Season 7

The sixth season of the American television series The Masked Singer premiered on Fox on September 22, 2021, following a sneak peek episode that aired on September 12, and concluded on December 15, 2021. The season was won by singer Jewel as "Queen of Hearts", with singer Todrick Hall finishing second as "Bull".

== Panelists and host ==
Season 6 panelists and host

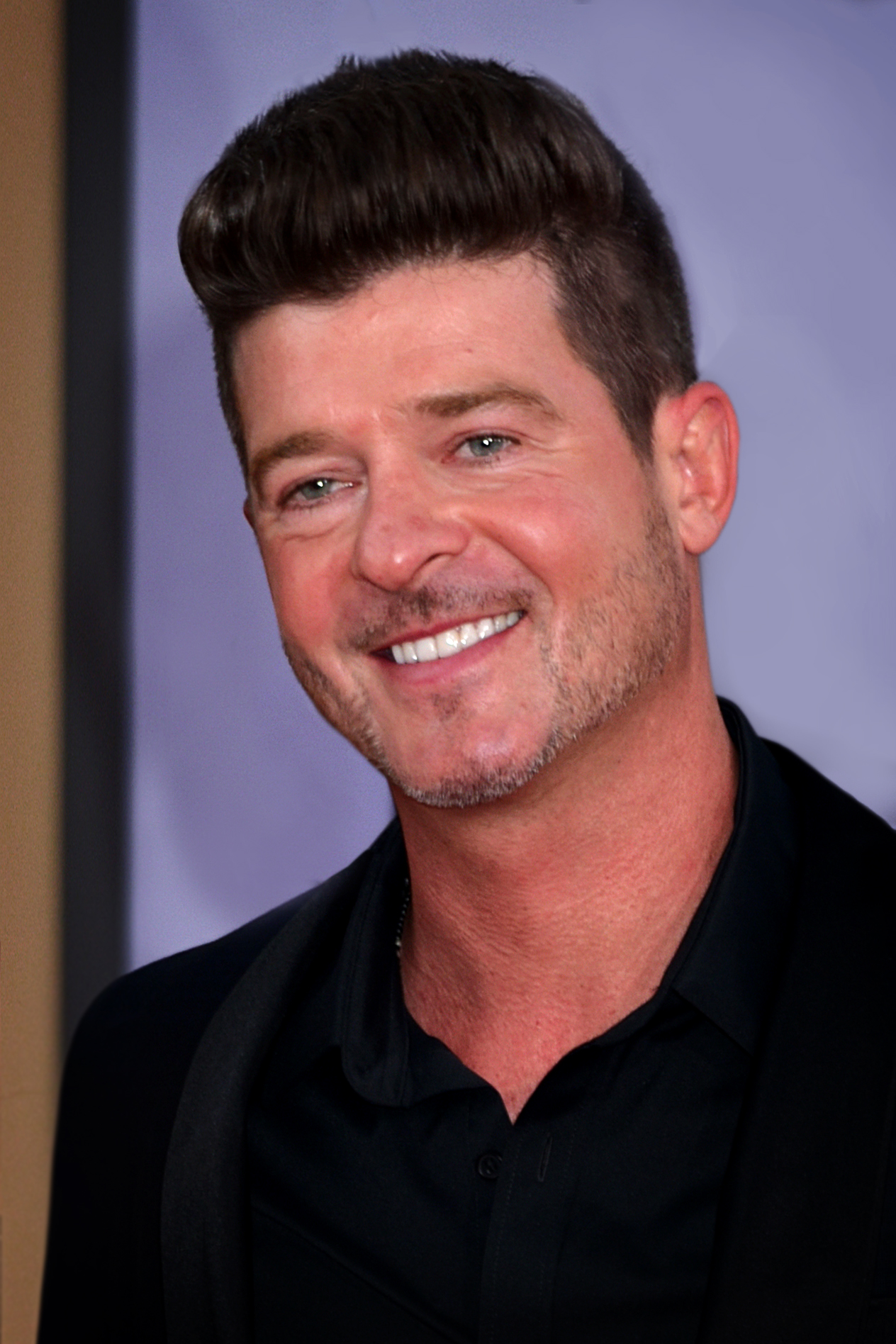
Robin Thicke

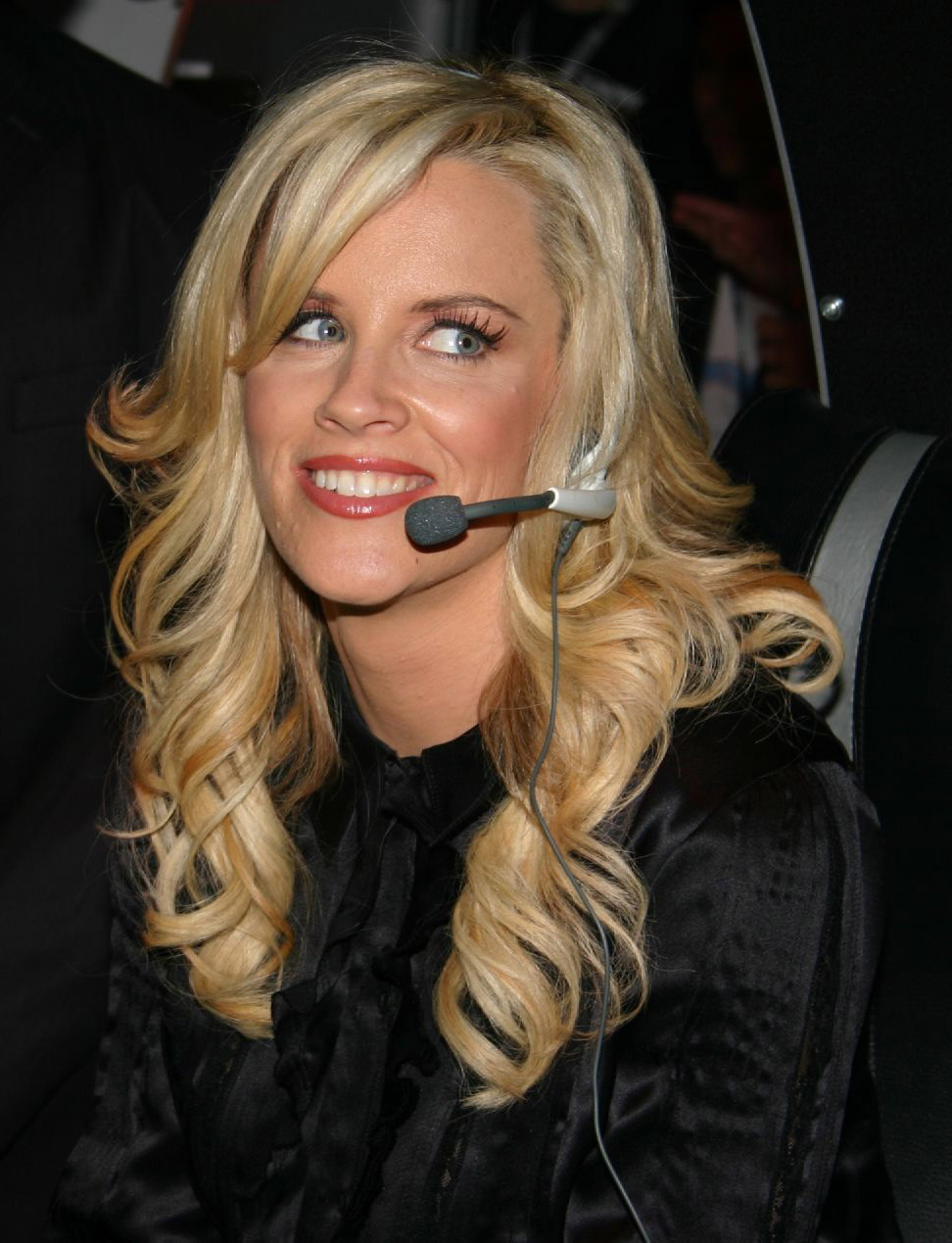
Jenny McCarthy Wahlberg

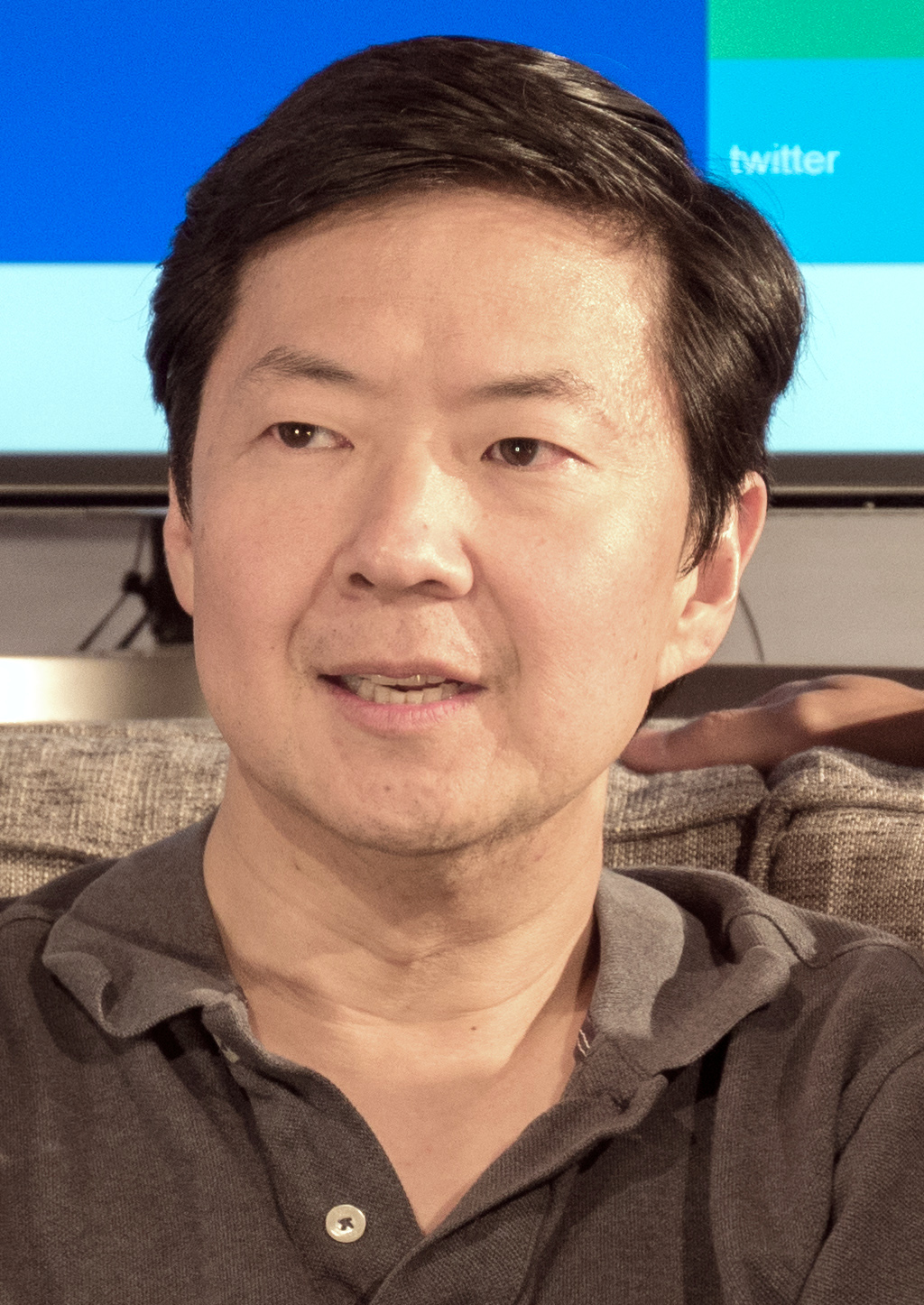
Ken Jeong

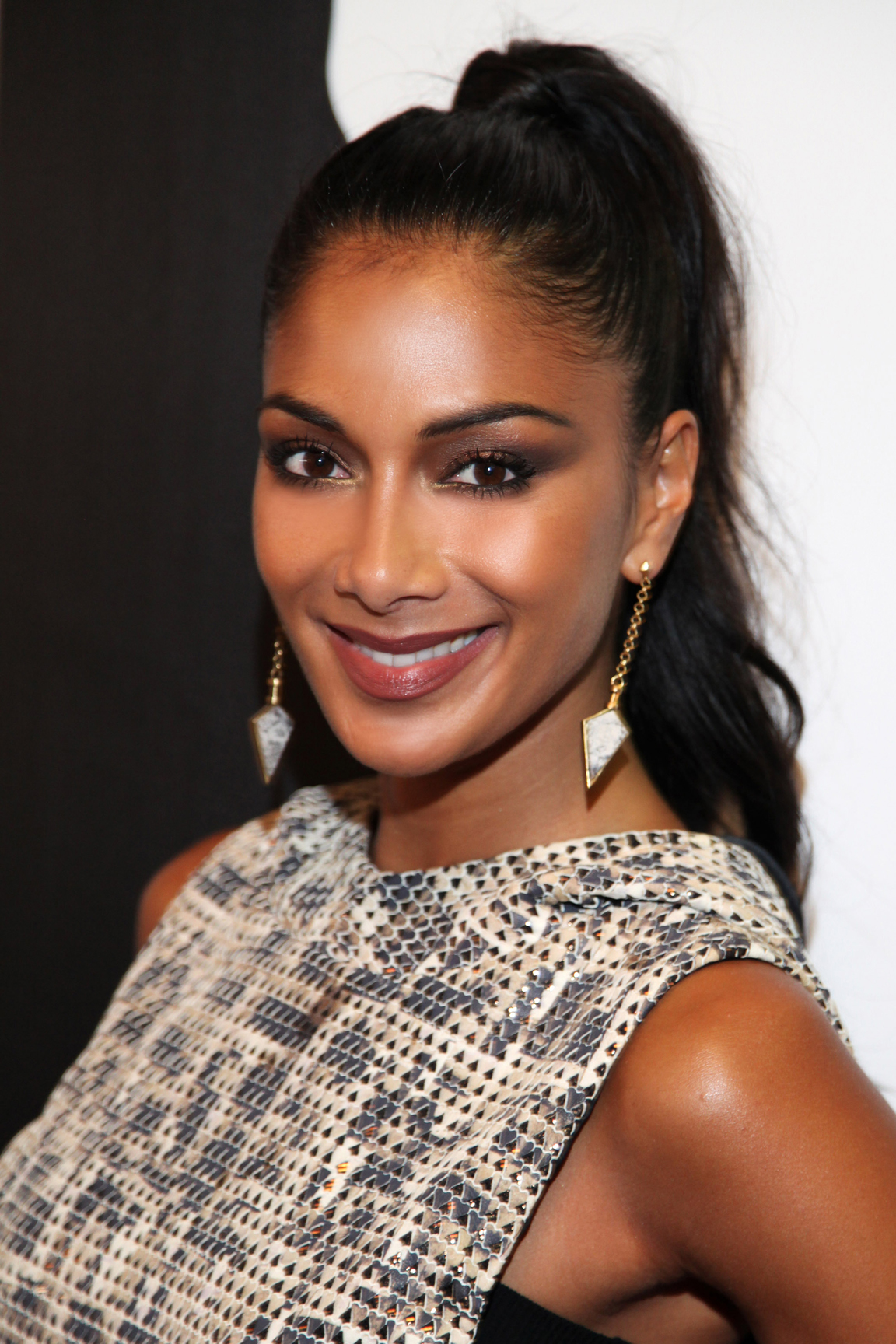
Nicole Scherzinger

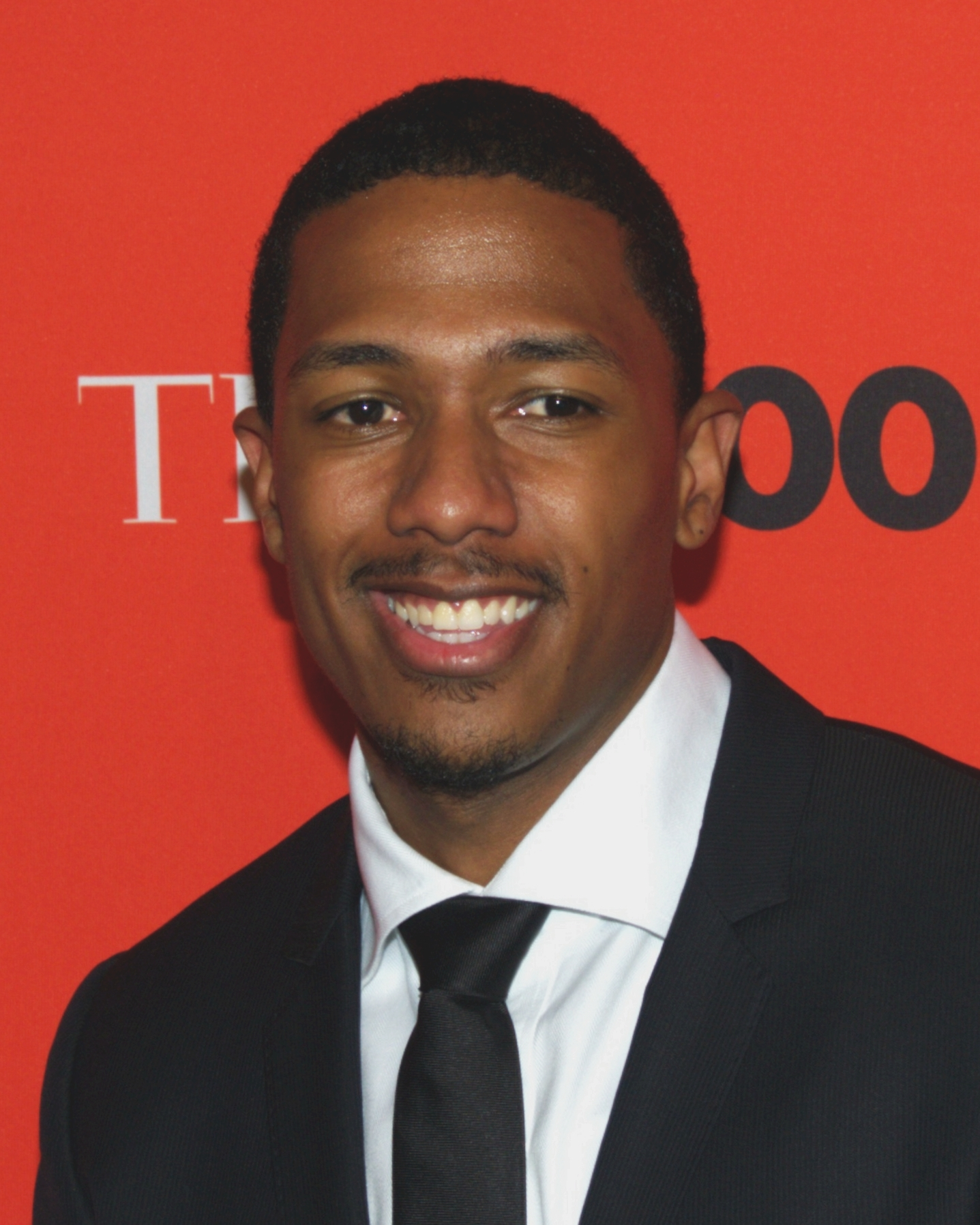
Nick Cannon

Nick Cannon, singer-songwriter Robin Thicke, television and radio personality Jenny McCarthy Wahlberg, actor and comedian Ken Jeong, and recording artist Nicole Scherzinger all returned as host and panelists. The panelists also again competed for the Golden Ear during the season, with Nicole Scherzinger winning for the first time.

Guest panelists in the season included Leslie Jordan in the sixth episode, Joel McHale in the seventh episode, will.i.am in the eighth episode, and Cheryl Hines in the ninth episode.

== Production ==
On May 17, 2021, it was announced that Fox renewed the series for a sixth season, prior to the airing of the fifth season's finale on May 26. On July 26, 2021, it was announced that the season would premiere with a two-night premiere on September 22 and 23.

Filming for the season began at the end of June 2021, with an expected wrap date of August 11. During production, it was reported that 12 positive cases of COVID-19 were confirmed at Red Studios Hollywood, though filming was not halted. Also aided by the availability of COVID-19 vaccines, this season features a studio audience for the first time since season three (the last season filmed prior to the start of the pandemic), though with a smaller size than it used to be.

A new twist called the 'Take It Off Buzzer' was introduced in this season. The button can be used once for each group. If a panelist pushes it and guesses the celebrity correctly, then the contestant must take off their mask and be eliminated and the panelist will get two extra points towards their Golden Ear score. If the guess is incorrect, then the contestant keeps their mask on and stays in the competition. Ken Jeong pushed the button for Group A and incorrectly guessed that "Pepper" was Sara Bareilles, while Jenny McCarthy Wahlberg pushed the button for Group B and incorrectly guessed that "Caterpillar" was Jake Gyllenhaal.

== Contestants ==
The season features two groups, Group A and Group B. For the first time in the show's history, the winner of each group will face-off against each other in the season finale episode. Wild cards, a concept introduced in the previous season, also return, being added to each group throughout the season to compete for the "Golden Mask" trophy themselves. The contestants in this season are reported to have a combined 85 Grammy nominations, 27 Grammy wins, 12 Emmy nominations, 12 Razzie Award nominations, three Academy Award nominations, two Super Bowl appearances, and two lifetime achievement awards.

"Baby" is the first human costume featured on the show.

Results
Stage name	Celebrity	Occupation(s)	Episodes											
Stage name	Celebrity	Occupation(s)	1	2	3	4	5	6	7	8	9	10	11	13
Stage name	Celebrity	Occupation(s)	Group A		Group B	A	B	A	B	A	B	A	B	13
Queen of Hearts	Jewel	Singer			SAFE		SAFE		SAFE		SAFE		WIN	WINNER
Bull	Todrick Hall	Singer	SAFE	SAFE		SAFE		SAFE		SAFE		WIN		RUNNER-UP
Banana Split	David Foster	Musician/composer			SAFE		SAFE		SAFE		SAFE		OUT	
Banana Split	Katharine McPhee	Singer/actor			SAFE		SAFE		SAFE		SAFE		OUT	
Skunk	Faith Evans	Singer	SAFE	SAFE		SAFE		SAFE		SAFE		OUT		
Caterpillar (WC)	Bobby Berk	TV host					SAFE		SAFE		OUT			
Mallard	Willie Robertson	TV personality			SAFE		SAFE		SAFE		OUT			
Pepper (WC)	Natasha Bedingfield	Singer				SAFE		SAFE		OUT				
Jester (WC)	Johnny Rotten	Singer						SAFE		OUT				
Beach Ball (WC)	Honey Boo Boo	TV personalities							OUT					
Beach Ball (WC)	Mama June	TV personalities							OUT					
Hamster (WC)	Rob Schneider	Actor/comedian		SAFE		SAFE		OUT						
Cupcake	Ruth Pointer (Note: After unmasking, Ruth Pointer stated that originally she and her sister Anita were to perform together as a pair of cupcakes, but Anita had to drop out because of illness.)	Singer			SAFE		OUT							
Baby (WC)	Larry the Cable Guy	Comedian/actor		SAFE		OUT								
Dalmatian	Tyga	Rapper			OUT									
Pufferfish	Toni Braxton	Singer	SAFE	OUT										
Mother Nature	Vivica A. Fox	Actor	OUT (Note: While eliminated in the first episode, Mother Nature was unmasked in the second episode.)											
Octopus	Dwight Howard	NBA player	OUT											

The masked singer won their face-off and remained in the competition.
The masked singer was safe from elimination.
The masked singer was eliminated from the competition and unmasked.
The masked singer did not perform.

(WC) This masked singer is a wild card contestant.

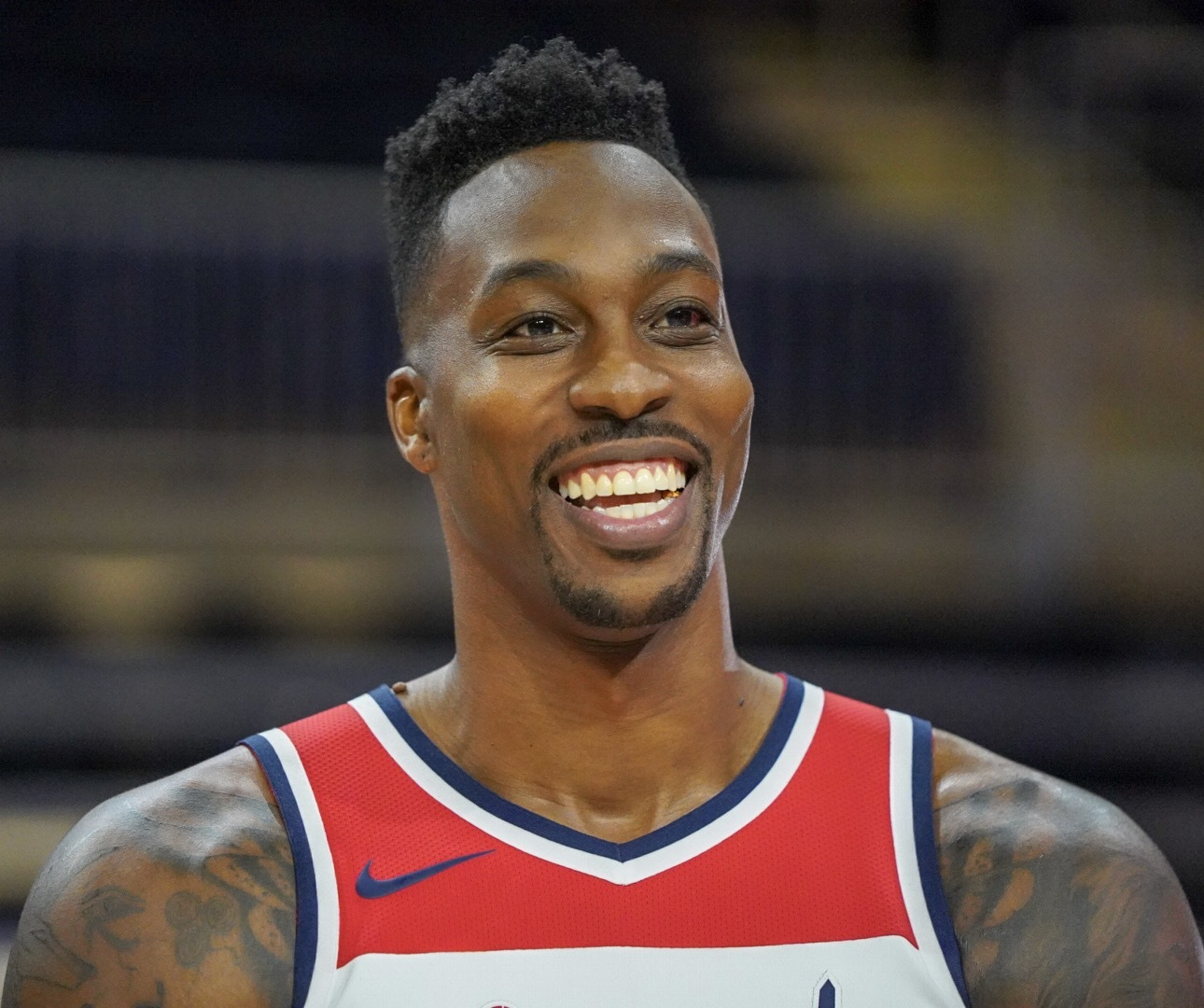
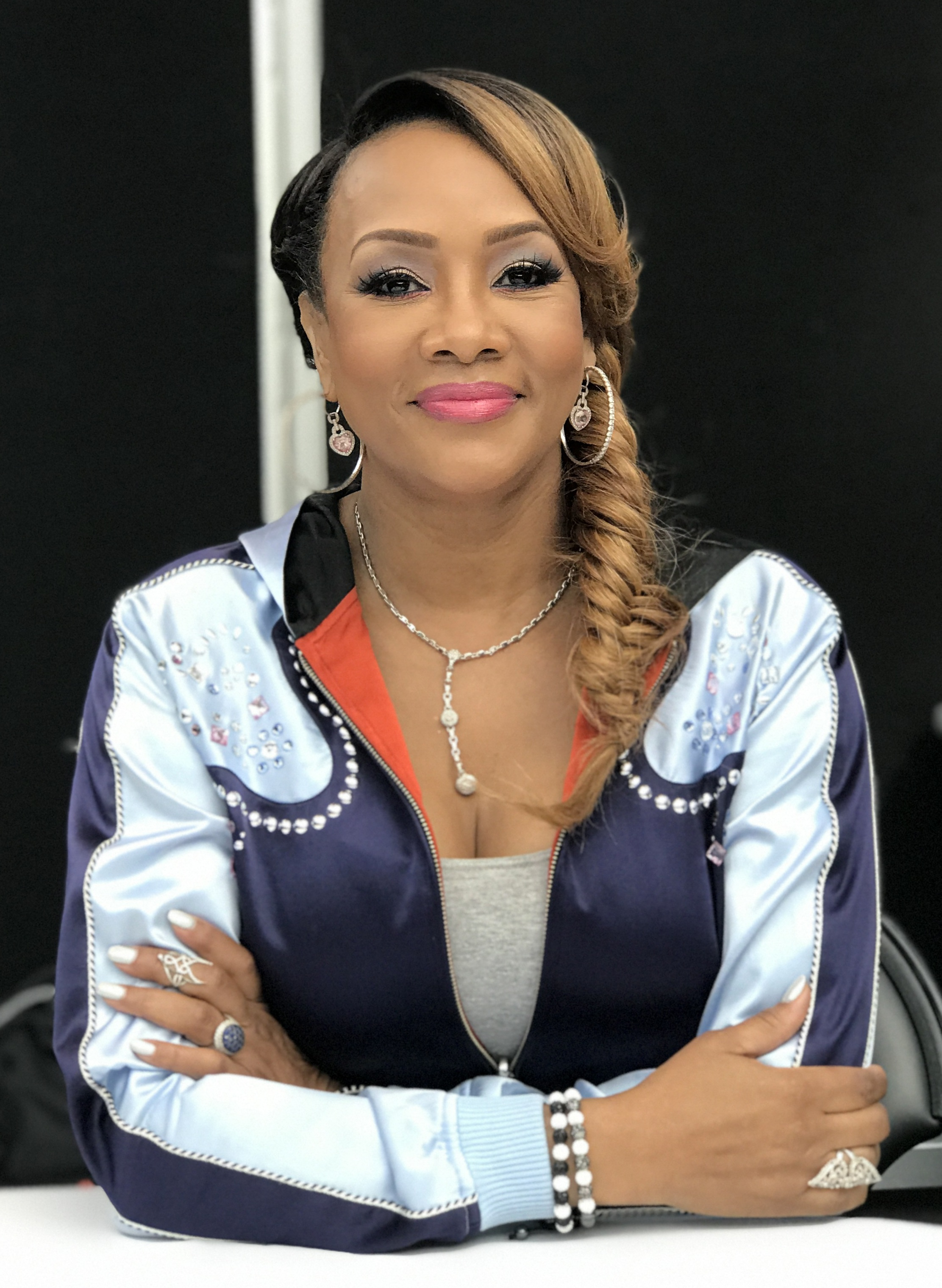
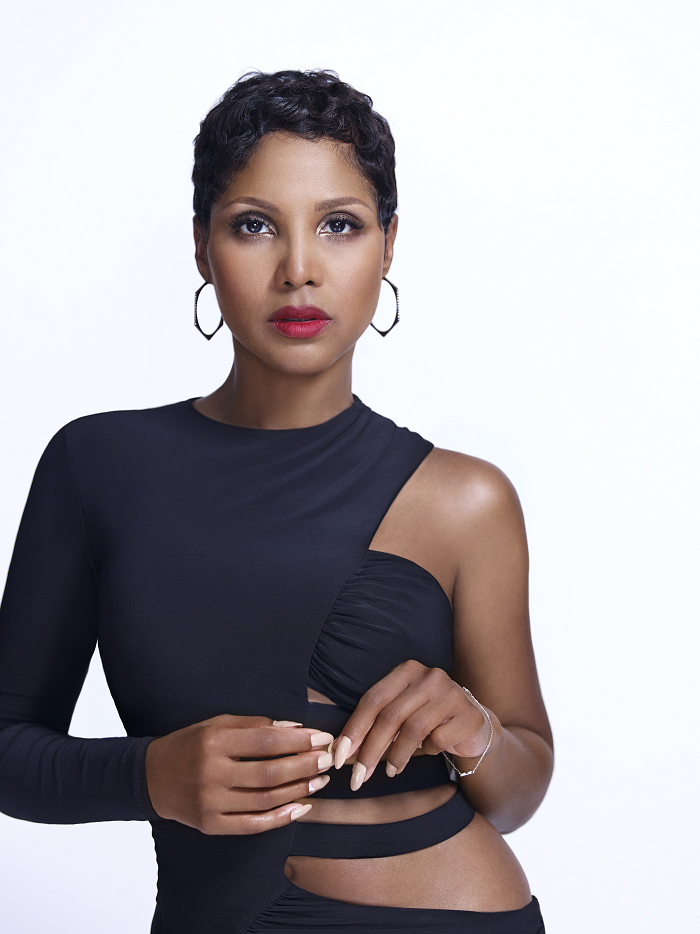
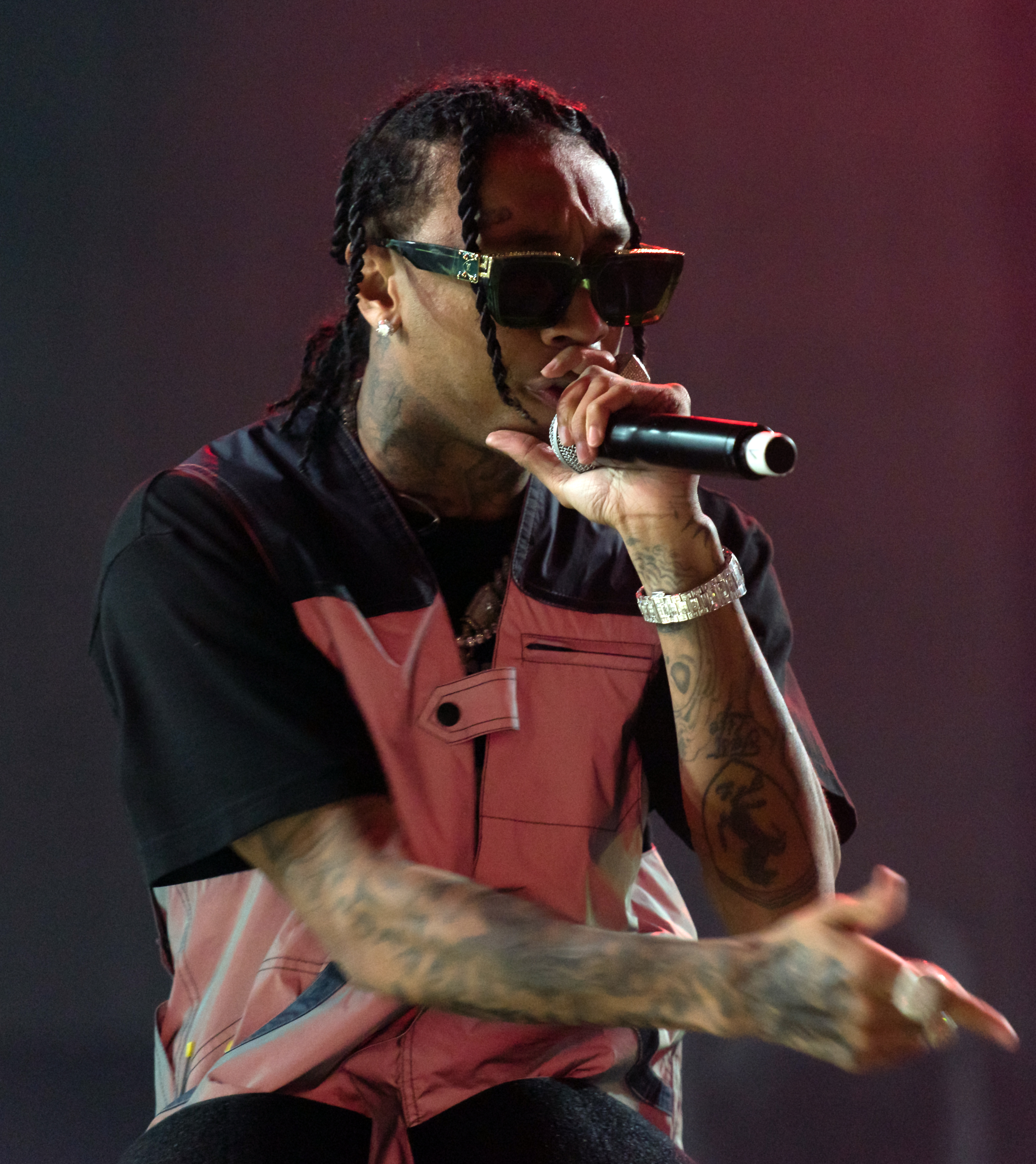
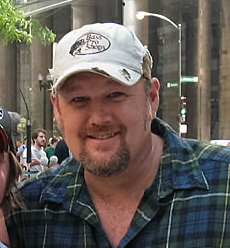
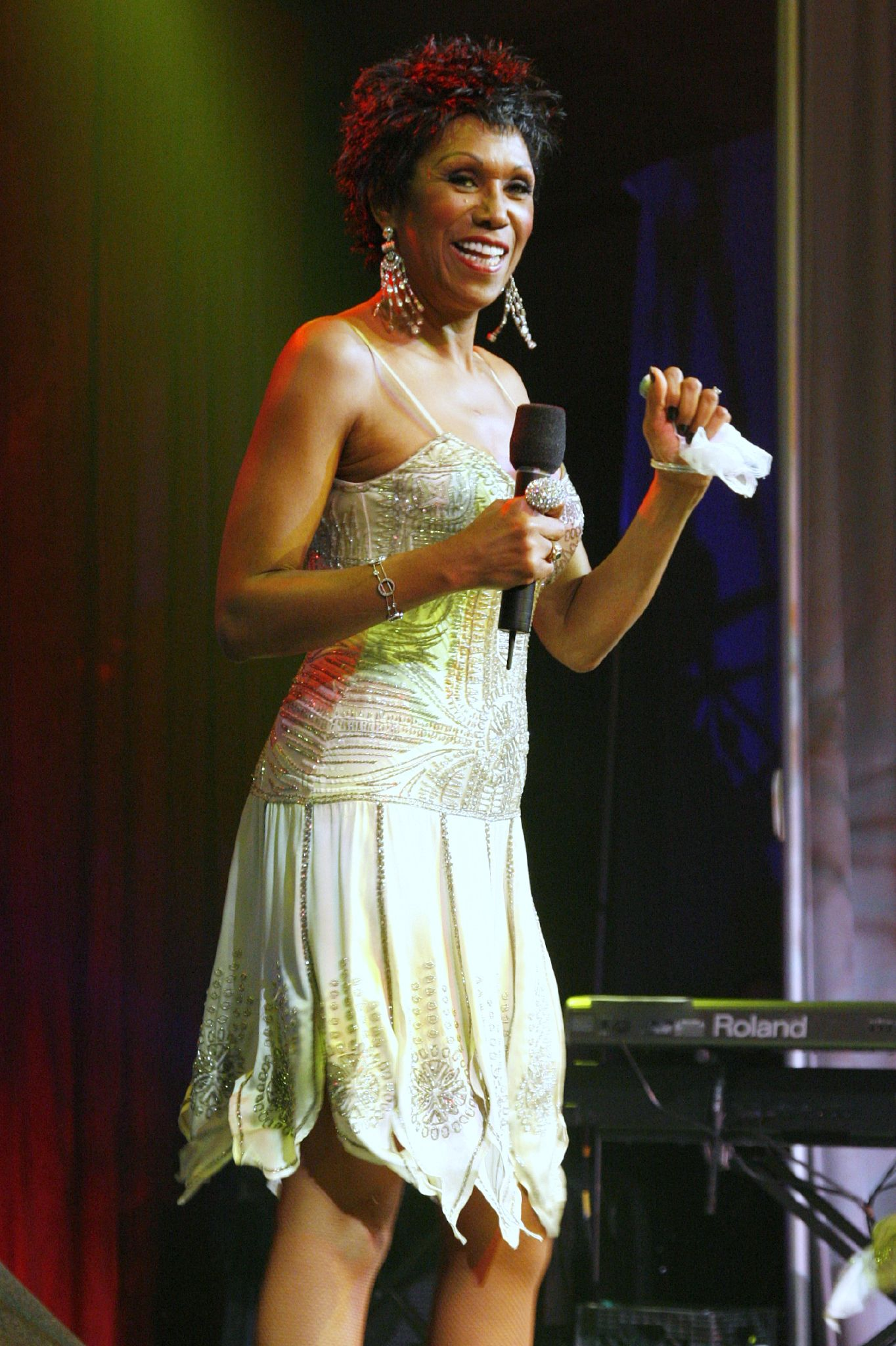
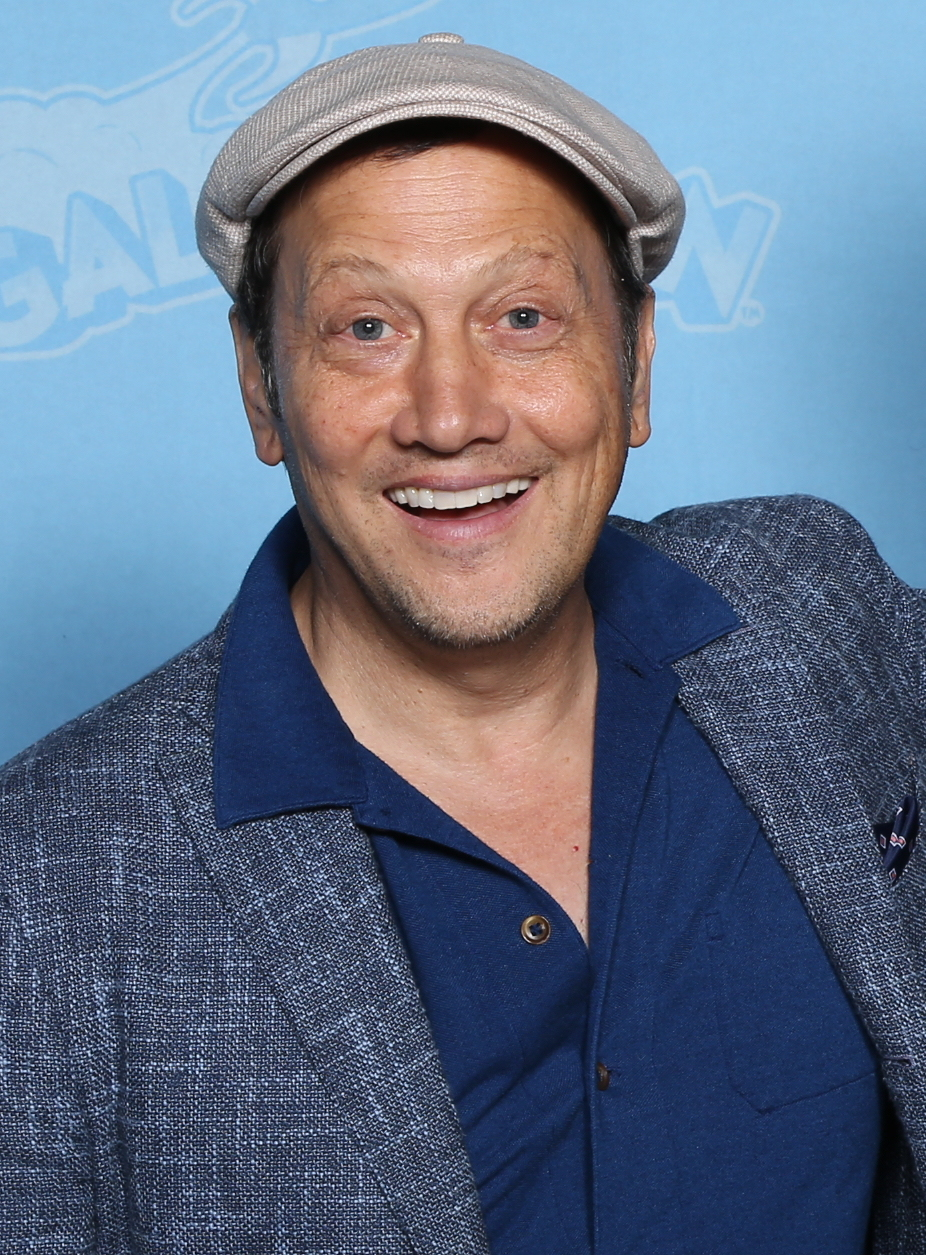
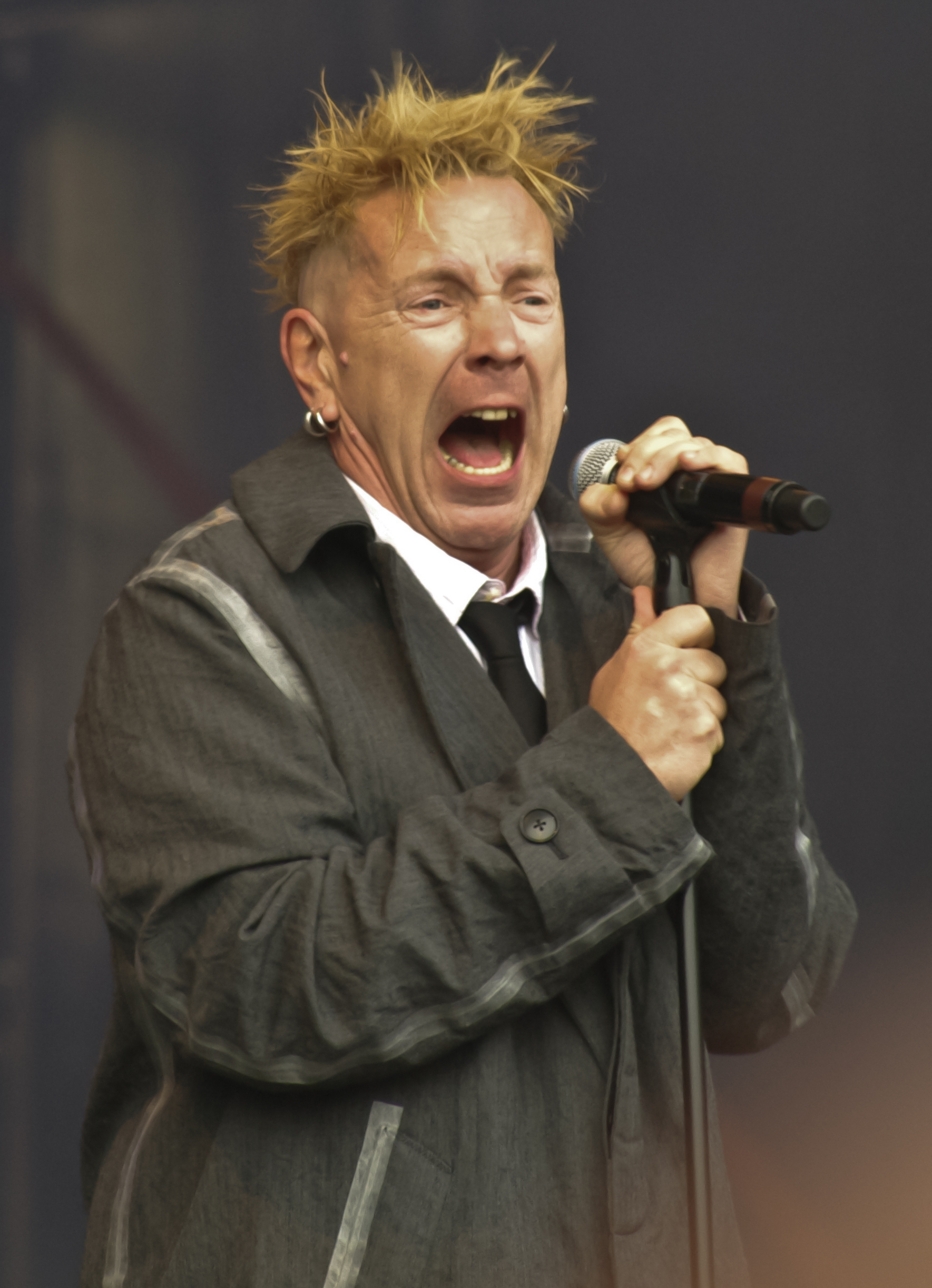
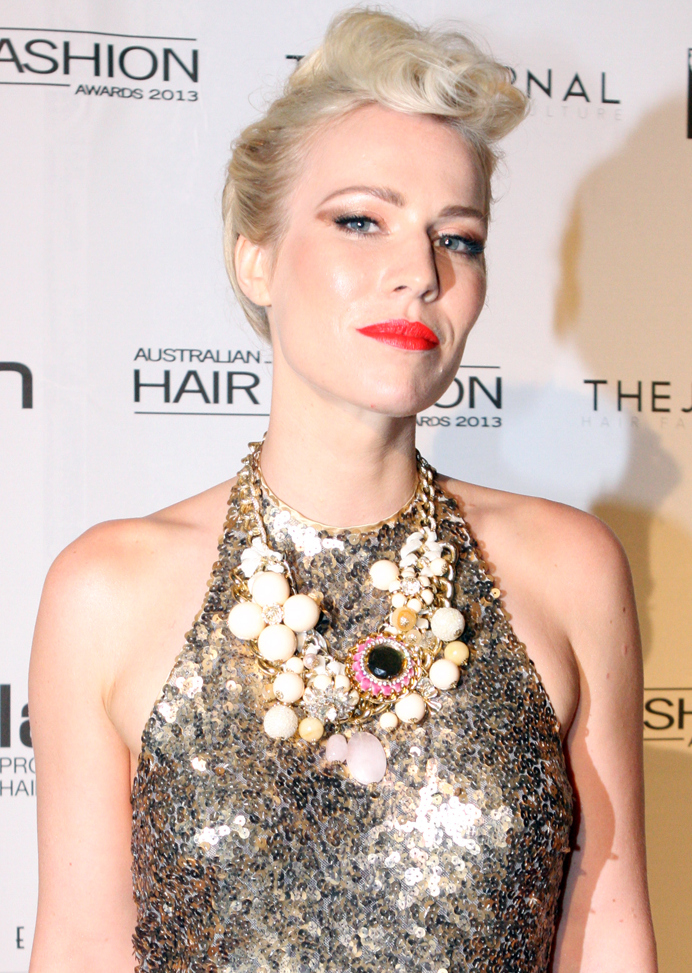
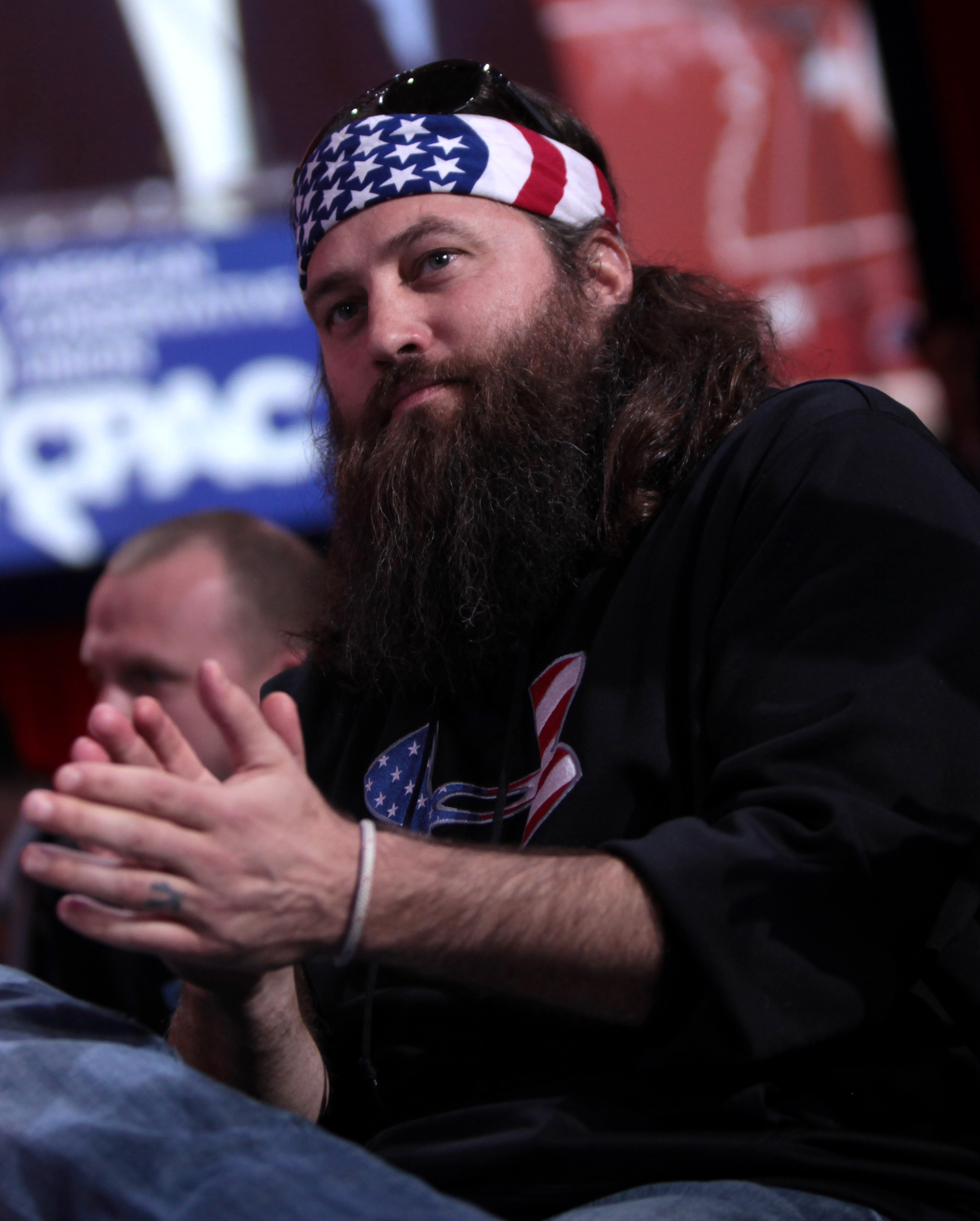
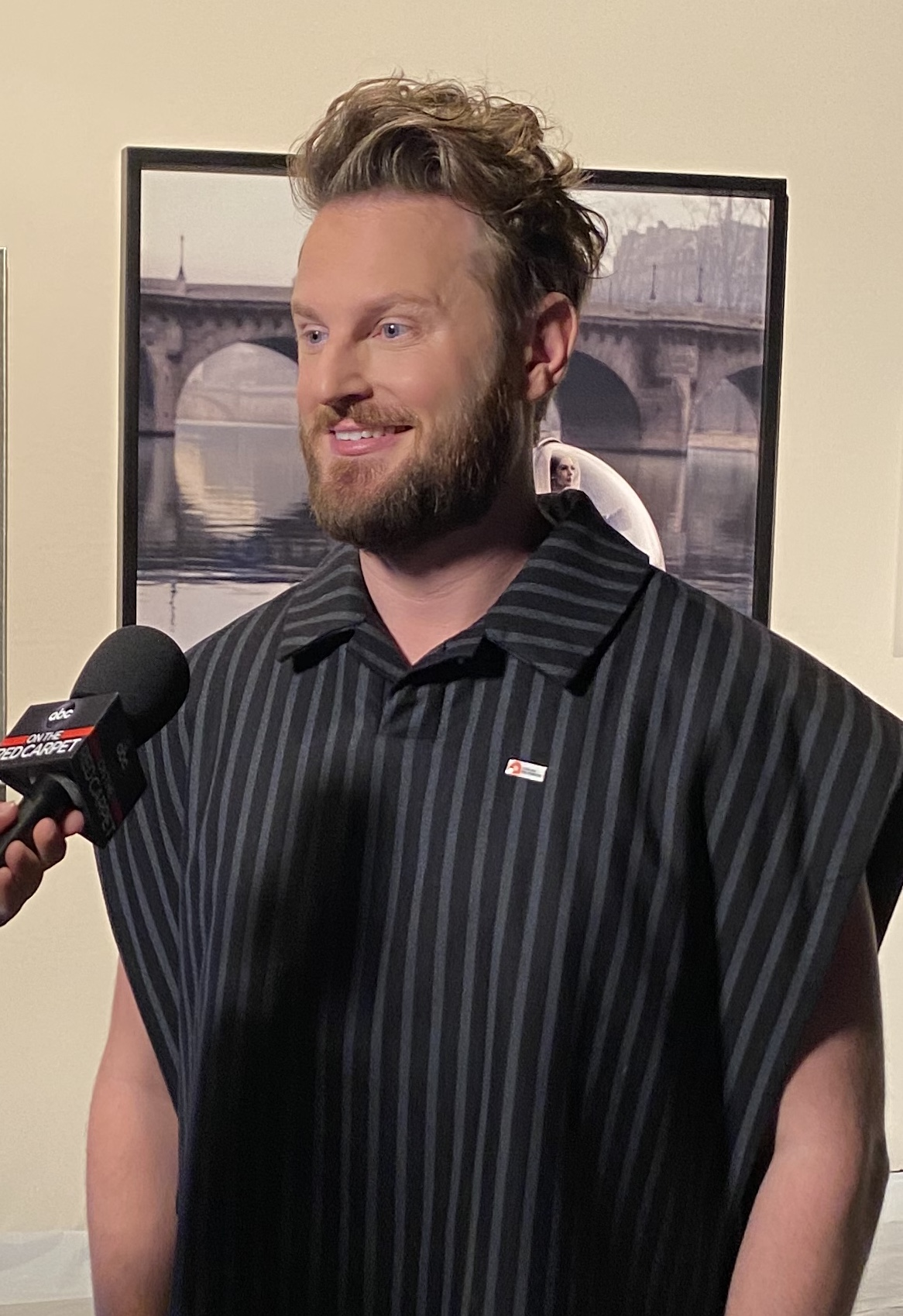
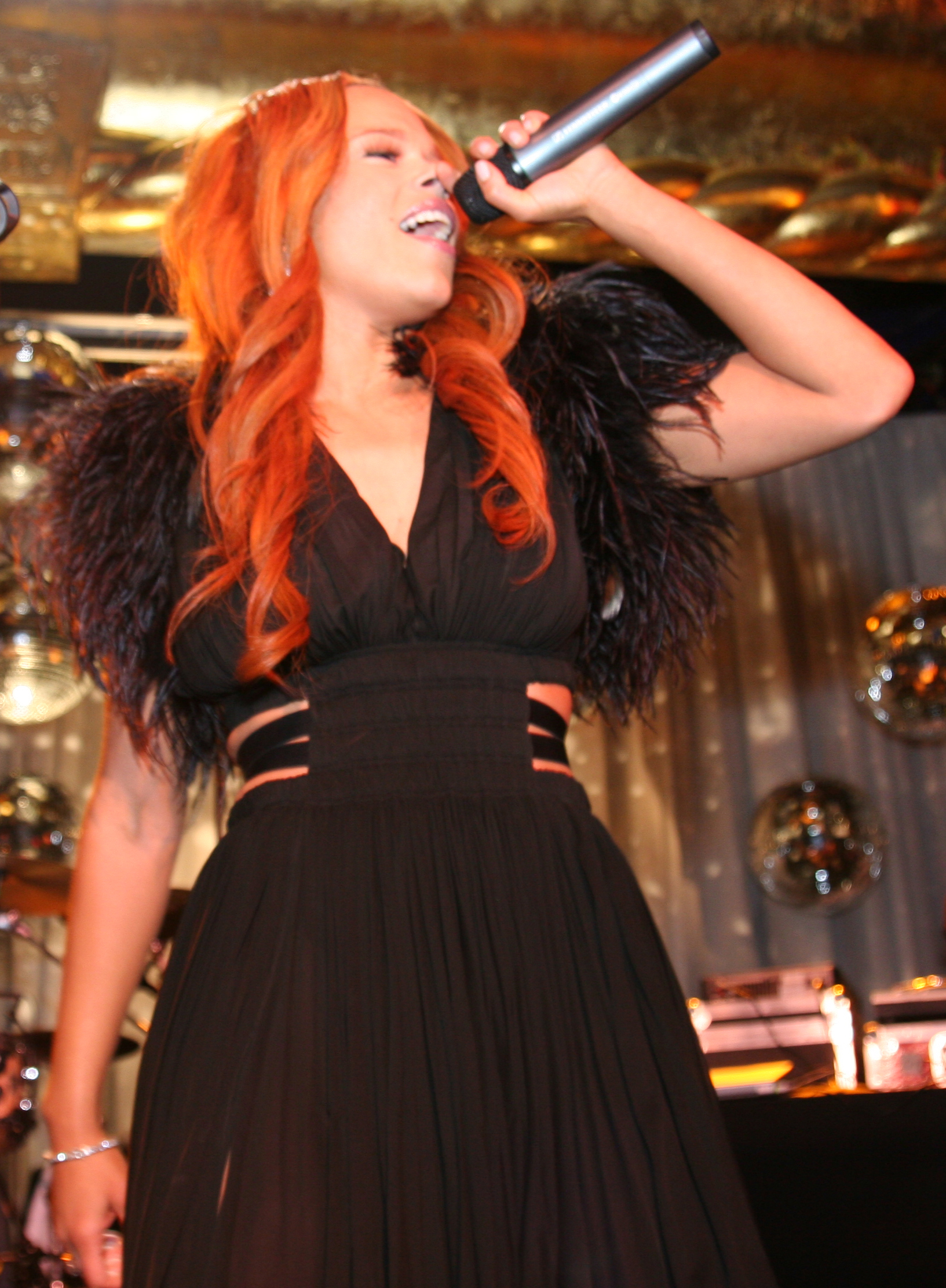
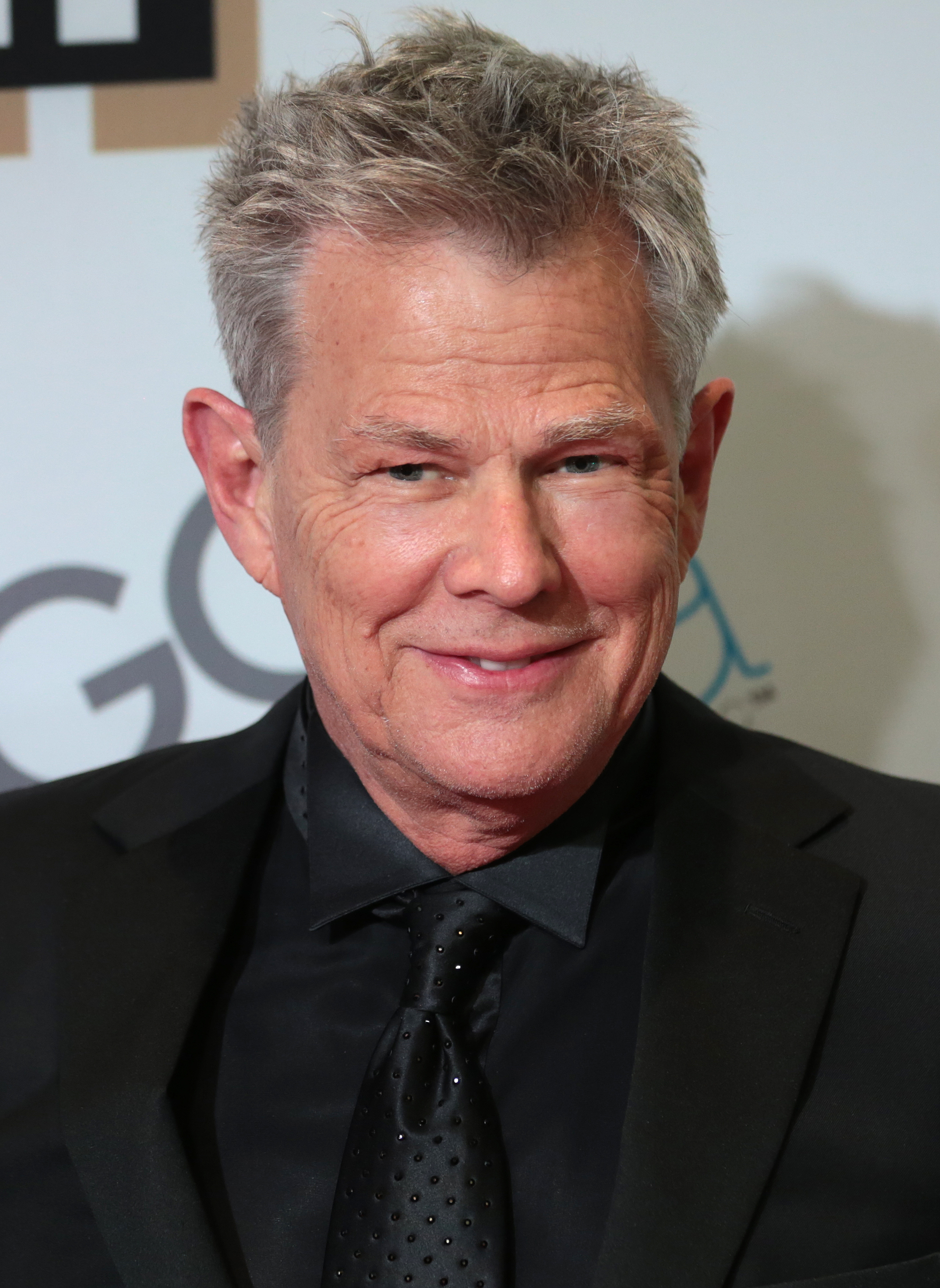
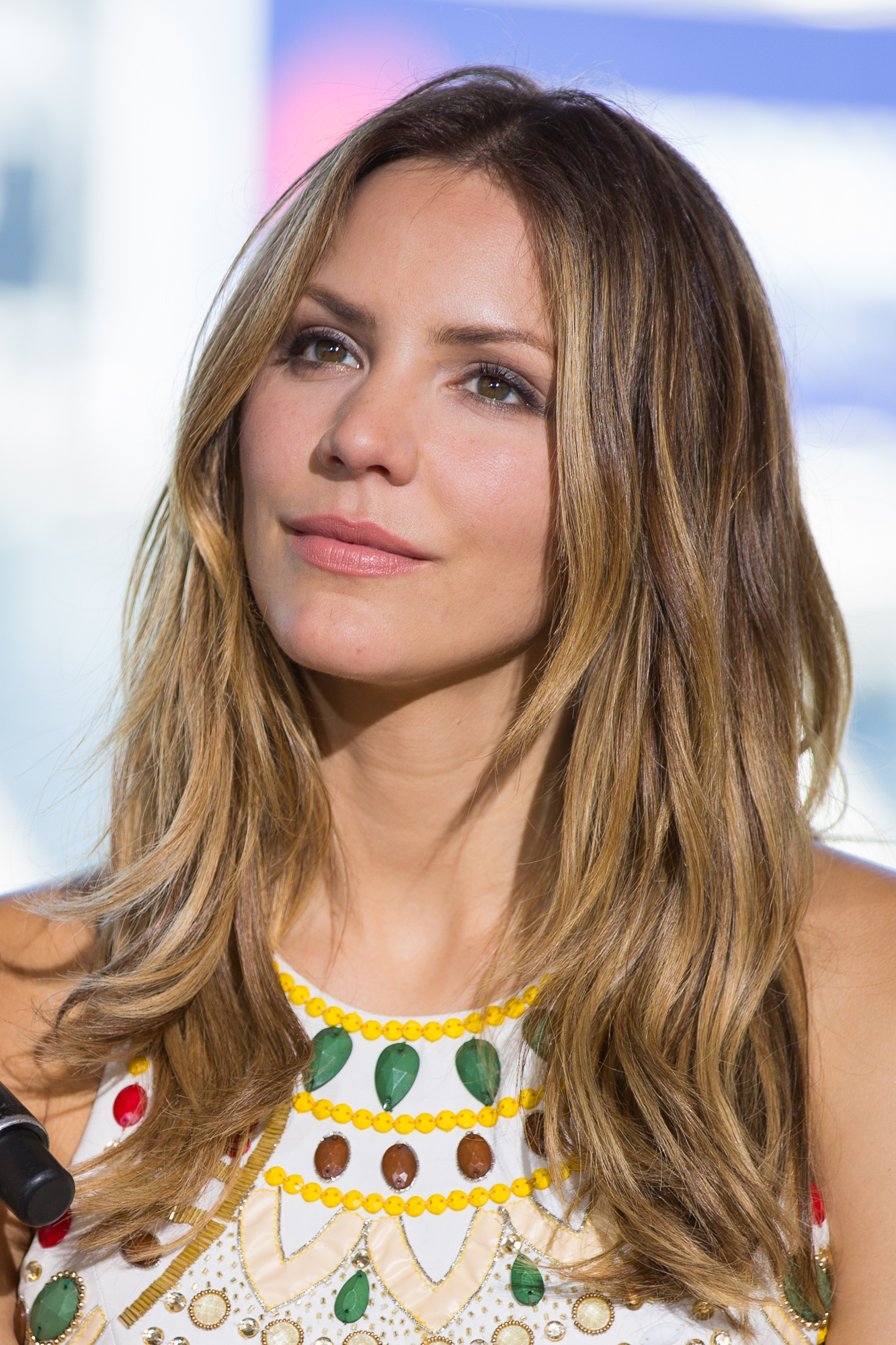
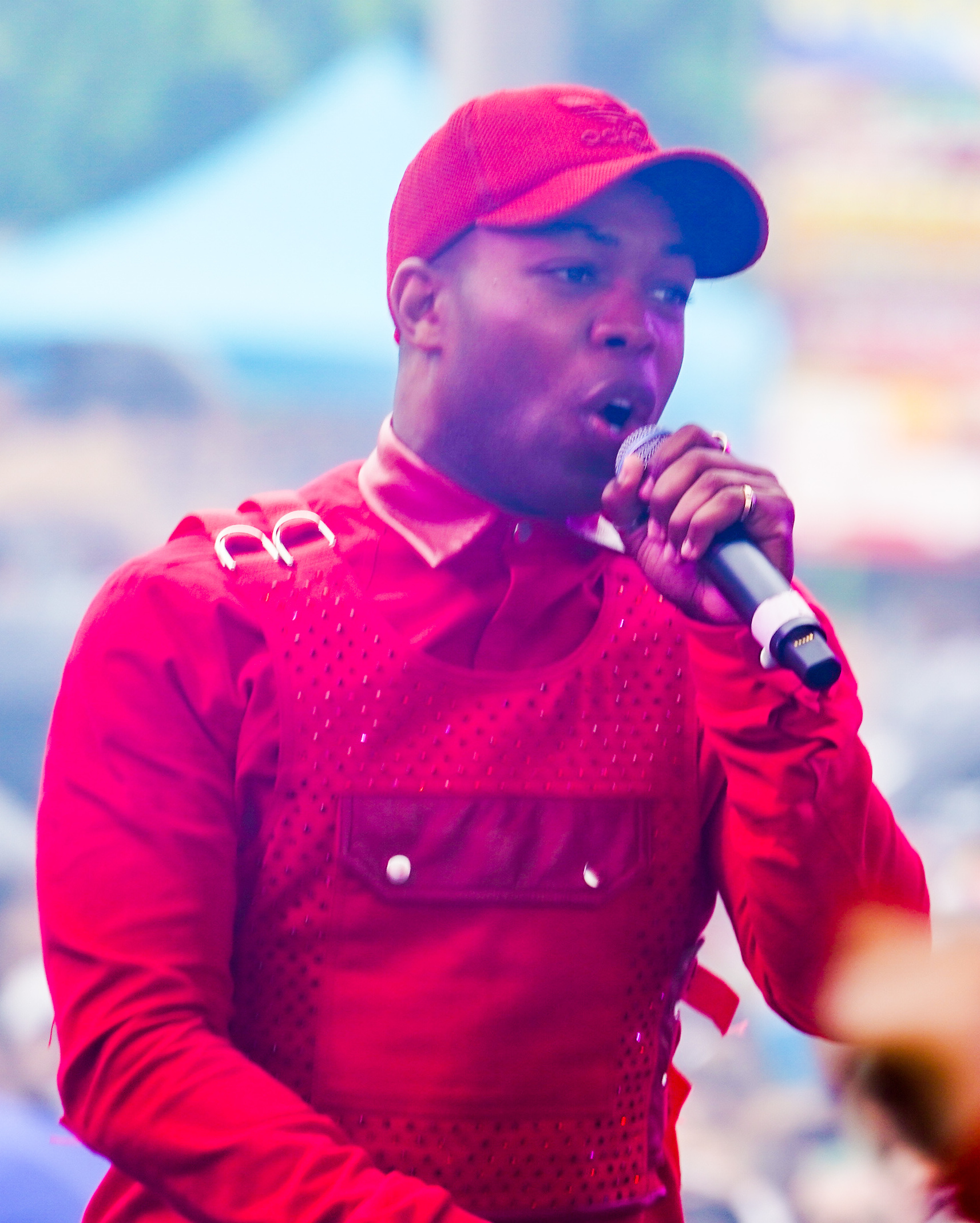
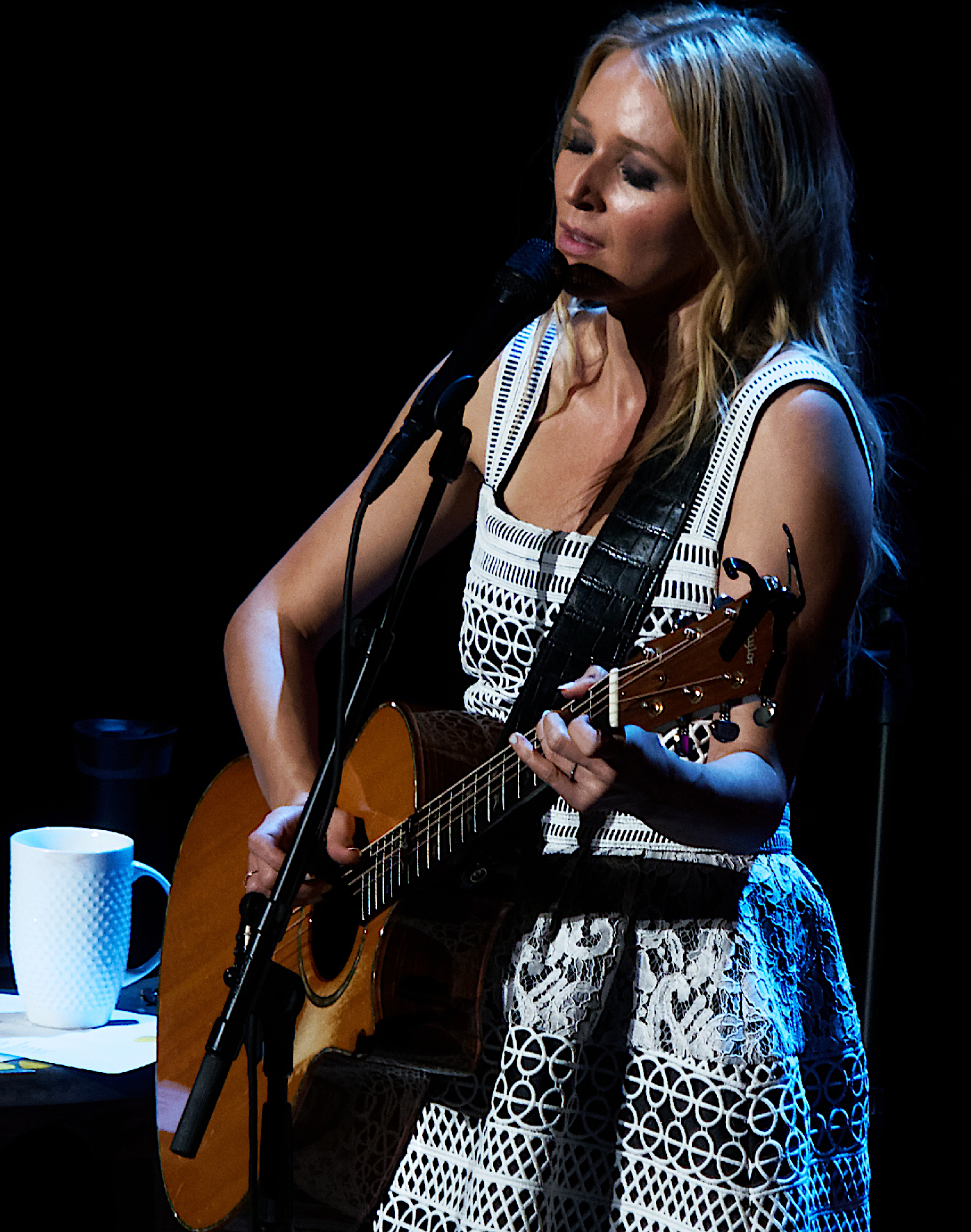
The celebrities who competed in the sixth season of The Masked Singer, pictured in order of elimination (L–R):

Dwight Howard ("Octopus"), Vivica A. Fox ("Mother Nature"), Toni Braxton ("Pufferfish"), Tyga ("Dalmatian"), Larry the Cable Guy ("Baby"), Ruth Pointer ("Cupcake"), Rob Schneider ("Hamster"), Johnny Rotten ("Jester"), Natasha Bedingfield ("Pepper"), Willie Robertson ("Mallard"), Bobby Berk ("Caterpillar"), Faith Evans ("Skunk"), David Foster & Katharine McPhee ("Banana Split"), Todrick Hall ("Bull"), and Jewel ("Queen of Hearts")

Not pictured: Honey Boo Boo and Mama June ("Beach Ball")

== Episodes ==
=== Week 1 (September 22 and 23) ===
Performances on the first episode
#	Stage name	Song	Identity	Result
1	Skunk	"Diamonds" by Sam Smith	undisclosed	SAFE
2	Octopus	"Tutti Frutti" by Little Richard	Dwight Howard	OUT
3	Pufferfish	"Say So" by Doja Cat	undisclosed	SAFE
4	Mother Nature	"I'm Coming Out" by Diana Ross	Vivica A. Fox	OUT
5	Bull	"Drops of Jupiter" by Train	undisclosed	SAFE

Performances on the second episode
#	Stage name	Song	Identity	Result
Wild card	Hamster	"Oh, Pretty Woman" by Roy Orbison	undisclosed	SAFE
1	Skunk	"It's a Man's, Man's, Man's World" by James Brown	undisclosed	SAFE
2	Pufferfish	"Levitating" by Dua Lipa feat. DaBaby	Toni Braxton (Note: After being unmasked, Braxton wore a KN95 mask over her mouth because of her lupus.)	OUT
3	Bull	"What Hurts the Most" by Rascal Flatts	undisclosed	SAFE
Wild card	Baby	"You're the First, the Last, My Everything" by Barry White	undisclosed	SAFE

=== Week 2 (September 29) ===
Performances on the third episode
#	Stage name	Song	Identity	Result
1	Queen of Hearts	"Born This Way" by Lady Gaga	undisclosed	SAFE
2	Mallard	"Save a Horse (Ride a Cowboy)" by Big & Rich	undisclosed	SAFE
3	Cupcake	"Heatwave" by Martha Reeves & the Vandellas	undisclosed	SAFE
4	Dalmatian	"Beautiful" by Snoop Dogg feat. Pharrell Williams	Tyga	OUT
5	Banana Split	"A Million Dreams" by P!nk	undisclosed	SAFE
5	Banana Split	"A Million Dreams" by P!nk	undisclosed	SAFE

=== Week 3 (October 6) ===
Performances on the fourth episode
#	Stage name	Song	Identity	Result
1	Bull	"Circus" by Britney Spears	undisclosed	SAFE
2	Hamster	"Crazy Little Thing Called Love" by Queen	undisclosed	SAFE
3	Skunk	"Midnight Train to Georgia" by Gladys Knight & the Pips	undisclosed	SAFE
4	Baby	"Meet the Flintstones" by Hoyt Curtin	Larry the Cable Guy	OUT
Wild card	Pepper	"Jealous" by Labrinth	undisclosed	SAFE

=== Week 4 (October 13) ===
Performances on the fifth episode
#	Stage name	Song	Identity	Result
1	Banana Split	"Cry Me a River" by Michael Bublé	undisclosed	SAFE
1	Banana Split	"Cry Me a River" by Michael Bublé	undisclosed	SAFE
2	Cupcake	"Finesse" by Bruno Mars	Ruth Pointer	OUT
3	Queen of Hearts	"La Vie en rose" by Édith Piaf	undisclosed	SAFE
4	Mallard	"My House" by Flo Rida	undisclosed	SAFE
Wild card	Caterpillar	"If I Were a Boy" by Beyoncé	undisclosed	SAFE

=== Week 5 (October 20) ===
Guest panelist performance: "This Little Light of Mine" performed by Leslie Jordan as "Soft Serve"

Performances on the sixth episode
#	Stage name	Song	Identity	Result
1	Bull	"Make You Feel My Love" by Bob Dylan	undisclosed	SAFE
2	Pepper	"No Tears Left to Cry" by Ariana Grande	undisclosed	SAFE
3	Skunk	"Square Biz" by Teena Marie	undisclosed	SAFE
4	Hamster	"Sabor a Mí" by Luis Miguel	Rob Schneider	OUT
Wild card	Jester	"School's Out" by Alice Cooper	undisclosed	SAFE

=== Week 6 (November 3) ===
Performances on the seventh episode
#	Stage name	Song	Identity	Result
1	Mallard	"Play Something Country" by Brooks & Dunn	undisclosed	SAFE
2	Caterpillar	"It's Gonna Be Me" by NSYNC	undisclosed	SAFE
3	Queen of Hearts	"River" by Bishop Briggs	undisclosed	SAFE
4	Banana Split	"Let 'er Rip" by The Chicks	undisclosed	SAFE
4	Banana Split	"Let 'er Rip" by The Chicks	undisclosed	SAFE
Wild card	Beach Ball	"Party in the U.S.A." by Miley Cyrus	Honey Boo Boo	OUT
Wild card	Beach Ball	"Party in the U.S.A." by Miley Cyrus	Mama June	OUT

=== Week 7 (November 10) ===
Performances on the eighth episode
#	Stage name	Song	Identity	Result
1	Bull	"Rain on Me" by Lady Gaga & Ariana Grande	undisclosed	SAFE
2	Pepper	"Sign of the Times" by Harry Styles	Natasha Bedingfield	OUT
3	Jester	"I Am a Man of Constant Sorrow" by Soggy Bottom Boys	Johnny Rotten	OUT
4	Skunk	"At Last" by Etta James	undisclosed	SAFE

=== Week 8 (November 17) ===
Performances on the ninth episode
#	Stage name	Song	Identity	Result
1	Banana Split	"Poker Face" by Lady Gaga	undisclosed	SAFE
1	Banana Split	"Poker Face" by Lady Gaga	undisclosed	SAFE
2	Caterpillar	"Friends in Low Places" by Garth Brooks	Bobby Berk	OUT
3	Mallard	"Fly" by Sugar Ray	Willie Robertson	OUT
4	Queen of Hearts	"She's Got You" by Patsy Cline	undisclosed	SAFE

=== Week 9 (December 1) ===
Performances on the tenth episode
#	Stage name (and duet partner)	Song	Identity	Result
1	Bull	"Straight Up" by Paula Abdul	undisclosed	WIN
2	Skunk	"I Never Loved a Man (The Way I Love You)" by Aretha Franklin	Faith Evans	OUT
3	Bull & Jesse McCartney	"Breakeven" by The Script		
4	Skunk & Michael Bolton	"Ain't No Mountain High Enough" by Marvin Gaye & Tammi Terrell		

=== Week 10 (December 8) ===
Performances on the eleventh episode
#	Stage name (and duet partner)	Song	Identity	Result
1	Banana Split	"Singin' in the Rain" by Arthur Freed	David Foster	OUT
1	Banana Split	"Singin' in the Rain" by Arthur Freed	Katharine McPhee	OUT
2	Queen of Hearts	"Bird Set Free" by Sia	undisclosed	WIN
3	Banana Split & Robin Thicke	"Don't You Worry 'bout a Thing" by Stevie Wonder		
4	Queen of Hearts & Nicole Scherzinger	"Dream On" by Aerosmith		

=== Week 11 (December 15) – Finale ===
Performances on the twelfth episode
#	Stage name	Song
1	Bull	"Holly Jolly Christmas" by Burl Ives
2	Queen of Hearts	"Have Yourself a Merry Little Christmas" by Frank Sinatra

Performances on the final episode
#	Stage name	Song	Identity	Result
1	Bull	"You Gotta Be" by Des'ree	Todrick Hall	RUNNER-UP
1	Bull	"Invisible" by Hunter Hayes	Todrick Hall	RUNNER-UP
2	Queen of Hearts	"What's Going On" by Marvin Gaye	Jewel	WINNER
2	Queen of Hearts	"Firework" by Katy Perry	Jewel	WINNER

== Ratings ==
Viewership and ratings per episode of The Masked Singer (American TV series) season 6
No.	Title	Air date	Timeslot (ET)	Rating/share (18–49)	Viewers (millions)	DVR (18–49)	DVR viewers (millions)	Total (18–49)	Total viewers (millions)	Ref.
0	"The Masked Singer & Alter Ego Sneak Peek"	September 12, 2021	Sunday 8:00 p.m.	0.9/6	2.94	—N/a	—N/a	—N/a	—N/a	
1	"2 Night Season Premiere, Part 1: Group A Premiere"	September 22, 2021	Wednesday 8:00 p.m.	1.1/8	4.74	0.4	1.76	1.6	6.50	(Note: Live+7 ratings were unavailable, so Live+3 ratings have been used instead.)
2	"2 Night Season Premiere, Part 2: Back to School"	September 23, 2021	Thursday 8:00 p.m.	1.0/7	4.65	0.4	1.48	1.4	6.13	
3	"Group B Premiere"	September 29, 2021	Wednesday 8:00 p.m.	1.0/7	4.55	0.4	1.45	1.4	6.00	
4	"House Party"	October 6, 2021	Wednesday 8:00 p.m.	0.9/6	4.35	0.3	1.27	1.2	5.63	
5	"Date Night"	October 13, 2021	Wednesday 8:00 p.m.	1.0/7	4.60	0.4	1.62	1.4	6.21	
6	"Time Warp"	October 20, 2021	Wednesday 8:00 p.m.	1.0/7	4.53	0.5	1.74	1.4	6.27	
Special	"All-Time Countdown"	October 25, 2021	Monday 8:00 p.m.	0.4/3	2.28	0.2	0.85	0.6	3.14	
7	"Giving Thanks"	November 3, 2021	Wednesday 8:00 p.m.	0.9/7	4.20	0.3	1.30	1.3	5.50	
8	"Group A Semi-Final"	November 10, 2021	Wednesday 8:00 p.m.	0.9/6	3.96	0.3	1.40	1.2	5.36	
9	"Group B Semi-Final"	November 17, 2021	Wednesday 8:00 p.m.	1.0/8	4.64	0.4	1.47	1.4	6.11	
10	"Group A Finale"	December 1, 2021	Wednesday 8:00 p.m.	0.9/6	4.17	0.3	1.31	1.2	5.48	
11	"Group B Finale"	December 8, 2021	Wednesday 8:00 p.m.	0.9/6	4.32	0.4	1.61	1.2	5.93	
12	"2 Hour Grand Finale Part 1"	December 15, 2021	Wednesday 8:00 p.m.	0.8/6	4.41	0.2	0.92	1.0	5.33	
13	"2 Hour Grand Finale Part 2"	December 15, 2021	Wednesday 9:00 p.m.	1.0/7	5.08	0.2	1.12	1.2	6.19	
Special	"The Masked Singer Christmas Singalong"	December 22, 2021	Wednesday 8:00 p.m.	0.3/2	2.07	—N/a	—N/a	—N/a	—N/a	
