= List of Toddlers & Tiaras episodes =

The following is a list of episodes of the TLC reality television series Toddlers & Tiaras.

== Series overview ==
Season	Episodes	Originally released	
Season	Episodes	First released	Last released
1	9	January 27, 2009	April 14, 2009
2	18	July 22, 2009	February 17, 2010
3	18	June 2, 2010	February 23, 2011
4	18	June 15, 2011	December 28, 2011
5	31	January 4, 2012	February 6, 2013
6	13	June 5, 2013	October 16, 2013
7	13	August 24, 2016	November 23, 2016

== Episodes ==
=== Season 1 (2009) ===
No. overall	No. in season	Title	Original release date
1	1	"Universal Royalty National Pageant"	January 27, 2009
Everything is big in Texas, especially the stakes at Universal Royalty! In this pageant, mothers and daughters compete against each other to win the title of Ultimate Grand Supreme and $5,000 cash!! The competition is fierce between glitz girl Meaghan Jones and her mother Phyllis, who have no problem admitting they love each other, but would love winning that top prize even more! But mom Tanya Perez has a secret weapon: her husband, David, who is the ultimate pageant dad. And 47-year-old mom Stacey Alley performs a baton routine to make her daughter, Rebecca, proud. Will mom or daughter take home the biggest crown?
2	2	"Miss Georgia Spirit"	February 3, 2009
This first annual pageant brings in girls of all ages from all over Georgia, and range from full glitz to au naturale. It's a pageant where anything can happen and any girl can win! Strong contender and regional favorite Kayleigh, 6, keeps it real and goes all natural: no makeup, no hairpieces, nothing fake, while her competitor, Story, 5, is a pageant pro with everything from custom made outfits to full face makeup and even a coach! But don't rule out two-year-old Marleigh, who, between meltdowns behind the curtain, pulls it together long enough to shine on stage.
3	3	"Universal Royalty State Pageant"	February 10, 2009
Austin, Texas is home to Universal Royalty's state pageant. Texas is a staple in the pageant world and the competition is sure to be fierce. In this episode, we will watch a California professional at the age of five strut her stuff, a seven-year-old Texas native prove herself as a contender and we will also follow some rookies: a pair of Mississippi girls who are attending their first beauty pageant ever. The judging happens on stage while the drama ensues off stage as each mom tries to prove their baby is beautiful. These girls have their eye on the crown in hopes of claiming the coveted title of Ultimate Grand Supreme.
4	4	"The Chitlin' Strut"	February 17, 2009
This pageant in Salley, South Carolina, may be held in a very small town, but it draws girls from many states who have very big dreams of stardom. Last year's winner, Madison, 11, may not be the typical pageant girl but, with her mother's guidance, she's determined to keep her title. However, she has stiff competition in Aubrey, 10, a glitz girl who will do anything to win because after all, it hurts to be beautiful! In this full glitz pageant, will Alley, 7, be able to compete with her au' naturale approach to pageants? In the end, it's all up to the judges to decide who will be Miss Chitlin' 2008.
5	5	"Kentucky Southern Celebrity"	March 3, 2009
This pageant in the small coal-mining town of Inez, Kentucky draws kids from numerous states to give them the opportunity to "make dreams come true one crown at a time." Fierce competitor Holly, 7, pulls out all the stops to prepare, including shaving her legs and highlighting her hair. Her competition, Jadyn, takes a more natural approach but is still 100% confident she will take home the crown. But it's the spitfire, Kaleigha, who, at only 4 years old, makes the crowd go wild with her crazy on-stage antics. However, it's up to the judges to decide who will be crowned the Ultimate Grand Supreme.
6	6	"Southern Celebrity Wonderland Pageant"	March 17, 2009
With 90 contestants at the Wonderland pageant in Charleston, WV, there is plenty of great competition! But all eyes are on Payton, who at six years old, is hoping for a Grand Supreme title to mark his retirement from pageantry.
7	7	"Stars of Pennsylvania"	March 24, 2009
The stage is full of glitz and glamour at this pageant in Pittsburgh, PA. Even a massive snowstorm can't keep the diehard pageant kids away. For the Ayala sisters, Angela, 8, Addison, 5, and Aliana, 2, it is their first time doing a glitz pageant!
8	8	"Texas Walk of Fame"	April 7, 2009
Dallas, Texas is the home of the Texas Walk of Fame pageant, where boys and girls come from many states to win the highest title and $1000 cash! Feisty brothers Maverick, 2, and Hayden, 3, are completely unpredictable on stage, which frustrates their mom, Heather, who would rather they be girls anyway. Newcomer, Taralyn, 4, and her mother, Traci, work extra hard for this pageant since she is competing against her rival, pageant pro Faith, 5. Faith continuously wins over Taralyn and is completely confident she can win the biggest crown once again. But when neither Taralyn nor Faith perform to perfection, it's anyone's game and only the judges can decide who will win the Grand Supreme and $1000 cash!
9	9	"Darling Divas"	April 14, 2009
Brooklyn, New York is the home of the Darling Divas pageant where your inner diva shines! This pageant is a spectacle of colors with a Mardi Gras theme and a category called "living dolls" where kids can dress up and compete as their favorite doll! Little princess Paige, 4, does some unusual preparation with a chiropractic adjustment. And she really shines on stage thanks to her caviar hair treatment. Kiannah, 6, is so new to pageants that her mom and godmother can't seem to find common ground any of Kiannah's preparation. But it's pageant pro Essence, also 6, who, with the help of her coach, Margie, steals the show with her Mardi Gras and Tina Turner routines!

=== Season 2 (2009–2010) ===
No. overall	No. in season	Title	Original release date
10	1	"Universal Royalty"	July 22, 2009
Don't mess with Texas, especially when the stakes are high at the Universal Royalty Pageant. In this special birthday celebration pageant, nearly 100 contestants compete to win the title of Ultimate Grand Supreme and $1,000 cash! The competition is fierce between a full glitz professional, Eden Wood, 4, and fan favorite and pageant veteran, Cameron Fletcher, 7. Following in his accomplished footsteps is his two-week-old brother Cavin. The long shots vying for the title are a set of fraternal twins, AshLynn and Breanne, 6. Which child will win the biggest crown and take home $1,000 cash?
11	2	"Queens and Kings of America"	July 29, 2009
Guitars, puppies and savings bonds are all at stake at this year's Queens and Kings of America Pageant in Louisiana. The big threat, Tootie, 10, is blazing her trail for the top title and this girl hates to lose. Glitz girl Makynli, 5, just might have what it takes with her beauty to give Tootie a run for her money. Taylor, 4, has been in training for weeks in order to prepare for her biggest pageant yet. Will she be ready to shine on stage? The stress level is high with two days of fierce competition. In the end it is all up to the judges to decide who will be worthy of the top prize.
12	3	"West Virginia Walk of Fame"	August 5, 2009
This West Virginia pageant may be held in a small town, but the Walk of Fame pageant is big time. Hannah, 7, is coming off a two-year hiatus in the pageant world. A girl who would never lose has a lot to prove with her comeback attempt at the top title. Riley, 5, is not your typical pageant girl; she is just as comfortable wrestling as she is parading in her beauty dress. She is still new to the pageant system but is hoping to make an impression on the judges. Jayla, 6, will be sure to shine on stage and she's got a secret weapon, her father, a very invested pageant dad. It's a fight to the finish for the Supreme title in this pageant.
13	4	"America's Regal Gems"	August 12, 2009
East Coast Pageants draw a variety of glitz girls from New York to Utah. Victoria, 6, embarks on her first full glitz pageant. This African-American beauty goes all out to compete at America's Regal Gems: tanning, glitz gowns and even professional coaching are employed to get her to the top of her game. Competing against her is heavy hitter Morgan, 7, and Elexis, 6, who is hoping her winning edge will be her double entry in the talent category. The stakes are high, with a $1000 cash prize and an all-expenses-paid trip to Universal Studios. It's anyone's game and these girls are going for gold.
14	5	"National Gold Coast"	August 19, 2009
This National Gold Coast pageant is the real Little Miss Sunshine that brings together the best of the west. Newcomer Rylan, 4, is prepared and ready to give 110%. Competing against her is Emily, 4, a local favorite and a strong contender for the top title. Alicia, 7, is another pageant pro who has eyes only for the biggest crown. The battle is on as each girl brings her best performance and has her tiny heart invested in being Gold Coast's most prestigious royalty.
15	6	"Beautiful Dolls"	August 26, 2009
North Carolina holds high-end pageants where the glitz and glitter get you the gold. Kailee, 5, is already a pageant veteran and has eyes only for the big crowns. Competing against her are Skyler, 4, and the Gary sisters, Sterling, 5, and Paris, 3. Skyler has been preparing with her mother non-stop and will be taking on the role of a cop in her new outfit of choice. Kailee will be a rocker and the Gary girls get your attention as a sailor and firefighter. It is a tough competition where tears and tiaras fill the room as each girl has her hopes set on the top title.
16	7	"Dazzling Dreams"	September 2, 2009
Marmaduke, Arkansas draws a big crowd for the Babes of Summer pageant. Hope, 6, is the local heavy hitter, stepping it up for the fierce competition with a new dress and flipper for the occasion. Also entering the competition is Sara, 4, who takes it to a new level with professional hair and makeup, and the Sprinkle Sisters, who are a triple threat to beat at ages 6, 8 and 10. With $1000 at stake and an expected 179 contestants, can our girls capture the top title amidst the chaos and height of the competition?
17	8	"Outlaw Pageant"	September 9, 2009
In West Virginia, the Outlaw Pageant draws the most serious of competition. Isabella, 6, comes all the way from Michigan to compete against WV's true beauty Jayden, 5. Alongside these two is the local top contender Haley, 6, who enters the pageant expecting to win. The competition fires up with beauty and western wear. It is a fight to the finish as each of our girl's finds the top title is just within reach. Who will be crowned winner and who will fall short? Only the judges can decide.
18	9	"Gold Coast OC Spring Pageant"	September 16, 2009
The Golden Coast of California is host to this high-stakes pageant. The Beauty, Talent and Swimwear competitions will decide who will become the Ultimate High Point Winner. Newcomer Sparkal, 7, takes to the stage at her first glitz pageant. Returning heavy hitter Michaela, 8, has many titles to defend and more to claim this time around while Cassidy, 7, works her magic for the judges when she aims for the pageant's biggest crown. There is only one cash prize at stake. Who will prove to be worthy of the top title?
19	10	"Tiny Miss USA"	September 30, 2009
Mississippi is the host of the Tiny Miss USA pageant. Kragen, 8, has something to prove this time around, vying for the elusive Tiny Miss crown she calls "the one that got away." Competing against her is Mckenzie, 7, a personality the judges just can't overlook and Bayleigh, 5, the natural pageant veteran embarking on her very first glitz pageant. Will Bayleigh's beauty go full glitz? Will Kragen finally get to claim the crown? Or will McKenzie prove to be a contender for the top title? With hundreds of dollars at stake, the competition is sure to bring their best game!
20	11	"America's Fabulous Faces"	October 7, 2009
America's Fabulous Faces is a national chain of pageants claiming beauty takes you places and this time the competition takes us to Hawaii! Many island natives compete including Aaliyah, 5, whose supportive mother confidently admits she is the one to beat. Competing against her is fellow islander Jessie, 9, who relies on her love for pageants and intense focus to bring her to the top. Coming all the way from the mainland is Arizonian Lindsay, 7. With her blond hair, pale features and full glitz style she will be sure to stand out among the natives. The competition heats up as each contestant has her eye on the $1,000 prize.
21	12	"Universal Miss and Master International"	October 14, 2009
UMMI brings the best pageant contestants from all over the country to the Entertainment Capital of the World, Las Vegas. Heavy hitter Jordyn, 6, already holds a UMMI supreme title and now she is back to claim another big crown. Miranda, 7, will not let her alopecia stop her from bringing her talents to heat up the competition. Also making a play for the crown is Halia, 9, who has been preparing for months to shine at the biggest pageant of her career. It is four days of non-stop, high-end competition where only one will be judged worthy of the top title.
22	13	"Arizona Gold Coast"	October 21, 2009
The Gold Coast Pageant chain heads to Arizona where the competition heats up. Glitz girl Charlie, 4, has high expectations of winning big while Samantha, 4, has been preparing herself to step it up to become a top contender. Alyssa, 8, is also entering the pageant with hopes to claim another Gold Coast victory. With pageant royalty in their blood, this family goes to the extreme in order to make a play for the crown. Amidst the tears, mistakes, favoritism allegations and scheduling that is down to the wire it is going to be a tight race with room for only one at the top.
23	14	"Little Miss Glitz"	January 20, 2010
Little Miss Glitz in Tampa, Florida brings great competition from all over the country! Don't let the title fool you, because the boy division is fierce competition. Cruz, 22 months, is his mother's "million dollar baby" with looks that can steal any judge's heart. Maddox, 1 and a half years old, is also adorable and a surprisingly top contender. It must be his Oscar the Grouch talent routine! His older sister, Angelle, is not as into pageants as her mother would like her to be, so thankfully Maddox fulfills her dreams. Then there's Kinley, the happiest, cutest 3 year old who simply loves pageants! From top performances to constant tantrums, it's anyone's guess who takes home the crown!
24	15	"Southern Majestic Pageant"	January 27, 2010
Charlotte, North Carolina brings the heavy hitters into the pageant world, a lot of them coached by the infamous Amber of Amber's Angels. One student, Victoria, 7 is a handful for her grandparents but in the end shines on stage. Another veteran student, Chelsea, 10 pulls out all the stops in her routines to win a crown for her football player boyfriend. Then, huntress and pageant princess Arianna, 5, also counts on her grandmother and props from her pageant trailer to take her routines over the top. These girls with personality plus bring on their best game, but in the end the judges decide who goes home supreme.
25	16	"Southern Glitz Open State"	February 3, 2010
Louisiana is the home of Christy Cosby, pageant director and coach to the best of the best glitz girls! In her very own pageant, she brings the serious competition. Four-year- old Sadie is full of spunk! But will a music malfunction cost her a top title? Isabella may only be three, but her military mother makes sure every one of her routines is top notch. But the toughest competition just may be Bella, 5, who holds over 25 titles, including EIGHT ultimate grand Supremes! The competition has never been better!
26	17	"Gold Coast California Grand State Finals"	February 10, 2010
This classic pageant system in California never disappoints! Gold Coast is home to some of the best and biggest winners throughout the southwest. This particular pageant is a family affair! Laura, 6, not only brings it with her original pizza tossing talent but shines on stage in a duet with her dad. Diamond, 4, and mom, Jeanene work hard to win over the judges. And then there's Nicole, 5, whose mom, Melissa, and 83- year- old grandma, Virginia all compete to win the crown. It must be their vertical "exercise pole" that gives them all the edge over the rest of the competition!
27	18	"Universal Royalty National Pageant"	February 17, 2010
Pageant director Annette Hill outdoes herself once again in Austin, Texas! There is no bigger competition than this $5,000 cash prize pageant, and every kid there wants to win it! Pageant superstar Eden, 4 takes a break from her TV and film appearances to work the stage like never before. She MUST take back her crown from heavy hitter, Taralyn! Hot on Eden's heels is Janene, 5, whose mother Jeannie has made it her pageant mission to beat Eden, even buying one of Eden's old beauty dresses! But the four to five age group needs to look out for veteran Brooke, 9. She's not only beautiful, she's been competing and winning pageants as long as the other girls have been alive!

=== Season 3 (2010–2011) ===
No. overall	No. in season	Title	Original release date
28	1	"Le Maison de Paris"	June 2, 2010
It's the Le Maison de Paris Pageant as pageant veteran Alex, 9, has her eye on the top title. Also competing is Daisy, 7, whose dance moves are sure to draw attention and show-stopper Makenzie, 4, who brings more than just a winning attitude.
29	2	"Director's Choice Pageant"	June 9, 2010
It's the Director's Choice Pageant in Paragould, Arkansas as Carissa, 2, is a rising pageant star with loads of personality. Standing in her way Lexie, 5, a heavy hitter in the pageant world, and Zander, 5, a pageant diva in the boys division..
30	3	"America's Trezured Dollz"	June 16, 2010
Large prizes and lots of cash draw many contestants to the America's Trezured Dollz pageant in Nashville, Tennessee. But the pageant is off to a bad start when the pageant director is missing leading to an outraged crowd.
31	4	"America's Best Pageant"	June 23, 2010
America's Best Pageant may also have America's most dedicated pageant contestants. Taleah, 4, Jasmine, 5, and Lauren, 7, are all from families who have sacrificed a lot to get here, but which beauty will rise to the top to take home the big crown.
32	5	"Darling Divas"	June 30, 2010
Darling Divas is the Brooklyn pageant where they encourage you to "let the Diva in you shine." Kylie, 3, will do just that, but will it be enough to win over the judges. Meanwhile, Keanna, 5, and Liana, 8, believe they have what it takes to win it all.
33	6	"Southern Celebrity, North Carolina"	July 7, 2010
It's tears, tantrums and tie-breakers that keep the Southern Celebrity pageant buzzing. Aniston, 3, Teeghan, 3, and April, 6, are all here to compete, but only one can be crowned the Ultimate Grand Supreme.
34	7	"Winter Beauties"	July 14, 2010
Another Ultimate Grand Supreme title is up for grabs as Texas hosts the Winter Beauties Pageant. Kayleigh, 3, will compete alone on stage for the first time against heavy hitters Brooklyn, 10, and Brittannie, 9. Will she be ready to shine solo?
35	8	"Show Me Smiles Fantasy Pageant"	July 21, 2010
It's Show Me Smiles Fantasy Pageant in Bernie, Missouri. Haley, 8, is an out of this world competitor with an unforgettable father/daughter performance, but will Lexie, 9, stand in her way. Meanwhile, Olivia, 4, may shock them all.
36	9	"Royal Essence"	July 28, 2010
The storm clouds are brewing at the Royal Essence pageant, but it is all sunshine and smiles on stage. See Kaylee, 10, Darrick, 4, and Olivia, 3, all battle for the top crown and cash in this episode of Toddlers and Tiaras.
37	10	"Gold Coast, Arizona"	December 29, 2010
Makenzie, 4, is back and at the top of her game. Twins, Scarlett and Isabella, 1, are a dynamic duo supported heavily by their mother's millions. Danielle, 8, is very confident in her good looks and wants all eyes on her during this competition.
38	11	"Universal Royalty, Texas"	January 5, 2011
All the glitz and glamour shine on stage at the Universal Royalty pageant in Austin, Texas. Daddy's girl Ava, 3, attempts once again to live up to her father's big dreams of success but Mia, 2, proves to be a showstopper.
39	12	"Fancy Faces"	January 12, 2011
Falls, follies and pulled follicles are all part of the fun as Oklahoma City plays host to the Fancy Faces pageant. Watch pageant beauties SamiJo, 1, Jacklynn, 4, and Alexis, 5, all vie for the top crown and find out who has this year's fanciest face!
40	13	"Viva Las Vegas"	January 19, 2011
Gold Coast brings contestants from all over the country for an intense competition at the entertainment capital of the world for their Viva Las Vegas Pageant. Cassidy is back from season two, and competition heats up as only one beauty will be worthy of the High Point title.
41	14	"Mardi Gras"	January 26, 2011
Plenty of girls, beads and glitz all promise a good show at the Mardi Gras pageant in Darien, Georgia. The stage is set for a serious competition. It will be a tough decision for these judges as they decide who is worthy of the top title.
42	15	"Groovy Girls"	February 2, 2011
Texas is heating up, as Taralyn, 6, Brooklyn, 5, and newcomer Zana, 6, all fight for the title of Ultimate Grand Supreme at the Groovy Girls pageant in Nacogdoches, Texas.
43	16	"Southern Celebrity Ohio"	February 9, 2011
Trophies, crowns, and sashes are all at stake at this year's Southern Celebrity pageant in Athens, Ohio. The competition is fierce as Isabella, 7, Mercedes, 3, and Tiffany, 8, all vie for the top title and the prize money that goes with it.
44	17	"International Fresh Faces"	February 16, 2011
Lily, 3, is rough and tough; Ashley-Noelle, 2, is following in her mothers footsteps; Victoria, 7, is a determined performer.
45	18	"Rodeo Princess Pageant"	February 23, 2011
Pageant girls are rounding up for a showdown in Bridgeport, West Virginia at the Rodeo Princess Pageant. Who will lasso the biggest crown and take the top title? Only the judges can decide.

=== Season 4 (2011) ===
No. overall	No. in season	Title	Original release date
46	1	"Universal Royalty: The Ultimate Showdown"	June 15, 2011
It's on for the fan-favorite Universal Royalty Pageant. This 1980s themed Texas pageant is going to be the ultimate showdown between the two most famous girls to hit the pageant stage: MaKenzie and Eden.
47	2	"Halloween Bash"	June 22, 2011
The competition is scary for Pentecostal mom Ca'Trina and daughter Saryniti at the Halloween Bash in Oklahoma City.
48	3	"Circle City Stars and Cars"	June 29, 2011
Underdog Alaska, 7, turns it on in the final heat, but is it enough to win the race to Ultimate Grand Supreme?
49	4	"Southern Celebrity Mini Nationals"	July 6, 2011
Pageant prince Brock, 7 steals the show at the Southern Celebrity Mini National Pageant with his jazz and gymnastics.
50	5	"Universal Royalty Grand Nationals"	July 13, 2011
A stunning $10,000 prize is up for grabs at Universal Royalty Grand Nationals and everyone from toddler to teen wants it!
51	6	"Rock Star Divas and Dolls"	July 20, 2011
The competition burns up the stage at Rock Star Diva and Dolls, but it's the offstage antics of Olivia that wow the crowd!
52	7	"Miss Sugarplum Fairy"	July 27, 2011
Two sisters compete against each other for the first time at the Miss Sugar Plum Fairy pageant in Valdosta, Ga.
53	8	"Glamorous Beauties"	August 3, 2011
Beauty is in the eye of the judges at Glamorous Beauties for three gorgeous contestants: Ally, Emerald and Baylen.
54	9	"Rumble in the Jungle"	August 10, 2011
Pageant superstar and recording artist Eden defends her title at the Rumble in the Jungle in Louisville, Kentucky.
55	10	"Gold Coast Las Vegas"	August 24, 2011
Las Vegas native showgirl in training Desiree, is serious about claiming her hometown title, Kayla may only be three, but has the stage presence of a pageant pro. Kailia, has performing in her blood, as her Vegas performer parents groom her to be a star.
56	11	"Hearts and Crowns"	August 31, 2011
Maddy follows in her mom's glitz pageant footsteps, and even competes in her mom's padded Dolly Parton outfit! 10-year-old Queen teaches her mom the do's and don'ts of high glitz. Madison keeps her mom on her toes with her unpredictable behavior.
57	12	"Precious Moments Pageant"	September 7, 2011
These pageant dads are truly unforgettable! Chloe is a daddy's girl and refuses to practice with mom. Victoria has her costumes custom designed by her own pageant dad while Brystol gets her competitive drive from her race-car driving father.
58	13	"International Fresh Faces Missouri"	September 14, 2011
The rivalry is ON in Missouri as pageant pros Sydney and Maddison go head to head for the Ultimate Grand Supreme! Still learning the details is Paige, but has the charm of her sweet personality and quirky smile.
59	14	"Storybook Pageant"	September 21, 2011
At the Storybook Pageant Berkeley, 4 has her routines down, but the morning of the pageant wakes up sick. Alessondra 9, rocks her 1980s hair-do and long dress. Carley, 5, and her best friend/mom strive for perfection.
60	15	"Southern Celebrity Glitzmas"	December 7, 2011
Siblings Riley, 5 and Bob, 6, steal the show at Southern Celebrity Glitzmas pageant with their "fierce" drag queen moves!
61	16	"Island of Dreams Pageant"	December 14, 2011
Cadence, 8, has a secret weapon: her sass-talking Pageant Grandma. Two year-old Samara's mom is a tattooed, heavy metal singer. Pageant mom Kelly throws a full glitz fit when she thinks her daughter Natalie, 2, has lost the pageant.
62	17	"America's Ultimate Beauty"	December 21, 2011
SamiJo, 2, Alexes, 3, and Annabella, 7, pull out all the stops in their American Wear to be America's Ultimate Beauty.
63	18	"Crown Beauties"	December 28, 2011
It may be cold outside, but things are heating up in Hot Springs, Arkansas! Three girls and their coach moms from Perfection Studios face off: Adorable Penny Lane, 3, perfectionist Cassadee, 9, and wild child Torrann, 7.

=== Season 5 (2012–2013) ===
No. overall	No. in season	Title	Original release date
64	1	"Precious Moments Pageant 2011"	January 4, 2012
Underdog Alana, 6, goes up against gum-smacking Heaven, 6, and chocolate lover Laci, 8, pulls out all the stops to get the judges' attention.
65	2	"Lollipops and Gumdrops Pageant"	January 11, 2012
Pageant star MaKenzie faces squabbling sisters Kaylie and Brooke, as well as Hailey, who is trained by a professional drag queen.
66	3	"Universal Royalty Hollywood"	January 18, 2012
With $10,000 at stake at the Old Hollywood-themed pageant, tempers run high and conspiracy theories abound with pageant moms. Mia, 5, Isys, 6, and Saliz, 7, are determined to win Ultimate Grand Supreme.
67	4	"Glitzy Divas"	January 25, 2012
Ever Rose and Adriana diet to compete against big winner Madi.
68	5	"Darling Divas – New York"	April 4, 2012
At Darling Divas, Shian and Isabella go up against the notorious Paisley to compete for the big title in the Big Apple.
69	6	"Southern Celebrity: Fairytale Winter Pageant"	April 11, 2012
Rivals Gabby and Alaska battle on stage and off for the Ultimate title in the Fairytale Winter Pageant; local contender Ava, is confident she's going to win despite a lack of practice.
70	7	"Beautiful Me Disco Pageant"	April 18, 2012
Destiny's mom has pushed her credit cards to the limit; Camari needs to bring her best to outshine Sami-Jo.
71	8	"Circle City Wild West Showdown"	April 25, 2012
Sweet Daisy Mae, 8, sassy Bridget, 5, and firecracker Jacy, 8, compete in a wild west showdown to win a puppy.
72	9	"Storybook Pageant: Diamonds"	May 2, 2012
Diamonds are a girls' best friend at the StoryBook Pageant in Harrisburg, Pennsylvania but chaos ensues for Kylie, 5, Trinity, 5, and Sienna, 4 when their score sheets are revealed.
73	10	"Me and My Pet Pageant"	May 9, 2012
Karley, 6, Kali, 5, and twins Alycesaundra and Giavanna, 4 bring their pets to compete at the Me and My Pet Pageant.
74	11	"America's Genuine Jewel Pageant"	May 16, 2012
Mackenzie, Damitri'ana and Lacy Mae will go to Earth's end to win with an around-the-world theme.
75	12	"International Fresh Faces: Fairy Pageant"	May 23, 2012
Ava-Cate, 3, practices her booty smack while mom prays she doesn't do it on stage. Samantha, 7, is a perfectionist who has big expectations. Her biggest competition is the spunky Traven, 6, who wows the audience with his performances.
76	13	"Mississippi Sweet Pea Pageant"	May 30, 2012
Contestants Emma 3, McKenzie, 5 and Liz, 7 are fired up to win the Mississippi Sweet Pea luau themed pageant. Who will wow the judges and who will fight back against their comments.
77	14	"California Tropic Arizona"	July 11, 2012
Perfectionist Danielle, 10 and rivals Kayla, 4 and Kailia, 5 put it all on the line at the California Tropic Arizona pageant.
78	15	"Miss Mardi Gras Madness"	July 18, 2012
Can Tori, 5, Amiya, 6 and Jasmine, 10 overcome their pageant day debacles and reign supreme at the Miss Mardi Gras Madness Pageant in Shreveport, Louisiana?
79	16	"Out of this World Pageant"	July 25, 2012
Feisty Bella, 2, cutie Ava Lane, 3, and reserved Jayla, 7 hope their stars align at the Out of this World Pageant in Darien, Georgia.
80	17	"Hollywood Stars Pageant"	August 1, 2012
Sweet Kelsey, 5, and confident Casey, 7, go up against celebrity-obsessed Mia, who is only 4 years old, at the Hollywood Stars Pageant in Parsippany, NJ.
81	18	"Georgia's Most Beautiful Girls: Going for Gold"	August 8, 2012
"Honey Boo Boo" child Alana Thompson returns with renewed energy to compete at Georgia's Most Beautiful Girls Pageant in Atlanta, GA against glitz newbie Destiny, 5, and eight-year old pageant veteran Desaray.
82	19	"Universal Royalty Motown"	August 15, 2012
Mackenzie, 10, and her 7-year old brother Christian compete against feisty Jayla, 6, and newbie Chloe, 3, for $1,000 at the Universal Royalty Motown Pageant in Plano, Texas.
83	20	"Little Mr. and Miss Nevada"	August 22, 2012
Twins Scarlett and Isabella, now 3, turn on the charm at Little Miss and Mister Nevada Glitz Pageant. Drama ensues when sassy Elizabeth, 5, and poised arch rival Kylee, 6, go head-to-head.
84	21	"Beautiful Me: '50s Pageant"	August 29, 2012
Ava, 22 months, Emma, 8 and Destiny, 4 rock around the clock 50s style at the Beautiful Me Pageant in Gatlinburg, Tennessee.
85	22	"Most Memorable Moments"	December 12, 2012
Looking back at the 3 1/2 years profiling over 250 contestants
86	23	"Universal Royalty Christmas"	December 12, 2012
Ava, 3, Katlyn, 3 and pageant newbie Hailey, 9 compete for the greatest gift of Ultimate Grand Supreme at the Universal Royalty Christmas pageant in Austin, Texas.
87	24	"Carolina Queens Pageant"	December 19, 2012
Glitz newbies Selena, 3, and Mackenzie, 6, face fierce Faithlyn, 9, at the Carolina Queens Pageant in Columbia, South Carolina.
88	25	"Southern Elite: Cirque"	December 26, 2012
Jersie, 6, Ashley, 6, and rivals Gracie, 7, and Faithlyn, 9 all compete for the crown in Ky.
89	26	"International Fresh Faces: Kentucky Derby"	January 2, 2013
The derby goes full glitz at the IFF Pageant in Lexington, Kentucky with contestants Kendyl, 18 months, Jozy, 3 and Alanna, 6.
90	27	"California Tropic: Under the Sea Pageant"	January 9, 2013
Cariah, 4, Alyssa, 5, and Jordan 9, compete in Reno, Nevada.
91	28	"Pirate Pageant: A Glitzy Life for Me"	January 16, 2013
Paetynn, 4, Elesha, 5, and pro performer Daisy, 8, are out to win the competition at the Pirate Pageant in Nacogdoches, Texas.
92	29	"Stars 'n Glitz: Fiesta"	January 23, 2013
It's a party for Ariana, Alyssa and Natali at the Stars 'n Glitz Pageant in Charlotte, N.C.
93	30	"Cheetah-licious Pageant"	January 30, 2013
It gets wild for Brooklyn, 21 months, Bella, 2, and Emma Belle, 5, at the pageant in Quapaw, Oklahoma.
94	31	"International Fresh Faces: Circus Pageant"	February 6, 2013
It's all beauty Under the Big Top as Oliviana, 22 months, Alivia, 4, and glitz newbie Katlyn, 6, vie for the circus crown at the IFF Pageant in Macon, Georgia.

=== Season 6 (2013) ===
No. overall	No. in season	Title	Original release date
95	1	"Disco Fever Pageant"	June 5, 2013
Coffee loving Alexa goes up against diva Janeyah and her two moms as well as Brooke and her bodybuilder father.
96	2	"California Tropic: Sugar & Spice"	June 12, 2013
Distracted Bailey goes up against Daddy's girl Riley and Kelsie who gets a mayonnaise treatment on her hair; a mother is banned.
97	3	"Universal Royalty: Galaxy Queen"	June 12, 2013
Katlyn's family prays for pageant success; Ava and her mom channel spirits; this is Iyslah's first glitz pageant.
98	4	"Las Vegas: LalapaZOOza"	June 19, 2013
It's all about the entrance when Elizabeth, 6, and her Noni return to compete against Ava, 5, and Mimi, 3. In Las Vegas it's anyone's chance to win over the drag queen celebrity-impersonated judges as they compete for the tallest trophy in pageant history!
99	5	"When I Grow Up Pageant"	June 19, 2013
Lyric has a family of female wrestlers; five year-old twins Giavanna and Alycesaundra are considered pageant royalty; an argument with the pageant director leads to police intervention.
100	6	"Glitter Girls: Bollywood"	June 26, 2013
Two year-old Khloe's mom is proud to say she named her daughter after Khloe Kardashian. Ma'Leeh, 6, is new to the glitz pageant world and four year-old Brooklyn's mom, calls her a glitzy hillbilly. At the Bollywood pageant, see who takes the crown!
101	7	"Starz-N-Glitz: Stone Age"	July 3, 2013
Charli 2, is a DIT (Diva in Training), Savannah, 3, hates pageants and loves hockey, Maddisyn-Rae, 2, loves eating her boogers. At the Queen of the Stone Age pageant in Charlotte, NC, will all 3 girls meltdown or make it to stage, or will their dads save the day?
102	8	"Around the World Pageant"	July 10, 2013
Brenna, 6, is back and is now a local celebrity that expects the royal treatment. Sophia-Rayne, 3, shows off some of her Native American roots with a glitz twist while Madison's coach seems to attract pageant drama at the Around the World Pageant in SC.
103	9	"Me & My Pet: Tennessee"	September 18, 2013
Lily competes with her horse; Gabby wrangles her guinea pig; Rainbow Dash trains her dog to do a routine.
104	10	"Puttin' on the Glitz Pageant"	September 25, 2013
Kelsie and her mom are back to redeem their name after getting banned from the pageant in Las Vegas; Brooklyn has a big personality she's not afraid to share.
105	11	"If I Were a Rich Girl Pageant"	October 2, 2013
Kate is ready for her pageant with doll Katie by her side; Cherish competes against her mother more than the other girls; Kaden shows a boy can love football and pageants.
106	12	"Hollywood Starz Hip Hop"	October 9, 2013
Malina hopes to make a mark on the pageant world as an Indian contestant; Adrianna rocks out with her motorcycle riding family; Devin gets painted as a cheetah.
107	13	"History Of America Pageant"	October 16, 2013
Traven and mom LaNesia are back; former beauty queen India and her daughter Aja clash in practice; Jaidyn and her mother Tiffany take on Dr. Seuss as a historical figure.

=== Season 7 (2016) ===
No. overall	No. in season	Title	Original release date
108	1	"Cambrie vs. Jaimie: Game On!"	August 24, 2016
Pageant season begins with blood, snot and vomit as Cambrie's Court clashes with their rivals, the Sassy Supremes.
109	2	"Welcome to the Glitz Jungle!"	August 31, 2016
The Jungle Safari Pageant roars on. Cambrie's kids are on point; Jaimie's aren't. Kallyn gets confused. Selyse wanders off stage. Fed up, Kim asks Cambrie to coach Selyse. Which team will reign Mega Ultimate Grand Supreme and drive off in a new (toy) car?
110	3	"The Birth Certificate"	September 7, 2016
Jaimie and Cambrie take their teams back to the west coast to prepare for Gemstars Heroes v Villains Pageant-run by Jaimie's mom! Tensions on both sides flare as one mom gets kicked off the team while another is accused of lying about her kid's age.
111	4	"The Birth Certificate, Part 2"	September 14, 2016
Tensions rise all week between Cambrie's Court and the Sassy Supremes. Come pageant day, both teams are fired up and ready for the battle. But a disastrous series of events at Gemstars Heroes v Villains leads to an outcome that shocks everyone.
112	5	"The One to Beat"	September 21, 2016
Cambrie's on her home turf and up against Top Model's Amanda & Nisa. Each team thinks makeup man Mykel is THEIR secret weapon, until he double books himself out to both teams. Can Top Model top girl Landree pull off a win despite the debacle?
113	6	"Just Hit Somebody!"	September 28, 2016
Top Models finds a last minute replacement for Mykel, so Landree and Addison are able to compete; Cambrie's team struggles; one mom punches another over a rumor; by the end of the day, all three coaches end up in tears.
114	7	"The Georgia Jinx"	October 5, 2016
After a tough loss to the Top Models, Cambrie's Court travels to Georgia for the Cowgirls & Crowns Pageant with heavy hitter Landri.
115	8	"Here Come the Animals!"	October 12, 2016
Cambrie has Kailia, Callyn and Emily face off against Alycesaundra and Giavanna, past winners of the Me and My Pet Pageant.
116	9	"The Goat Poop Incident"	October 26, 2016
Chaos ensues when Aly and Gia's goat allegedly poops on the floor at the Me and My Pet Pageant, and neither Kelly nor her husband will clean it up.
117	10	"The Return of Eden Wood"	November 2, 2016
Eden Wood is back where her career began, at Universal Royalty in Austin, Texas, where she will be judging the tough competition between Cambrie's Court heavy hitter Abby, Jaimie's sassy girl Kaydence, and returning champion Princess Mehayle.
118	11	"Emergency at Universal Royalty"	November 9, 2016
For Princess Mehayle, mom Sharilynne and coach Nikki Nicole, pageant day at Universal Royalty goes from bad to worse with a slew of mistakes and mishaps on stage.
119	12	"The Final Showdown"	November 16, 2016
The Sassy Supremes and Cambrie's Court face off for the last time at pageant season's big finale, International Fresh Faces.
120	13	"A Team's Revenge"	November 23, 2016
The tension mounts between the Sassy Supremes and Cambrie's Court at the conclusion of International Fresh Faces; after two long days of competition, Sassy mom Jessica snaps and confronts Kim; the supreme team is crowned.
