= Adam Barta =

American singer

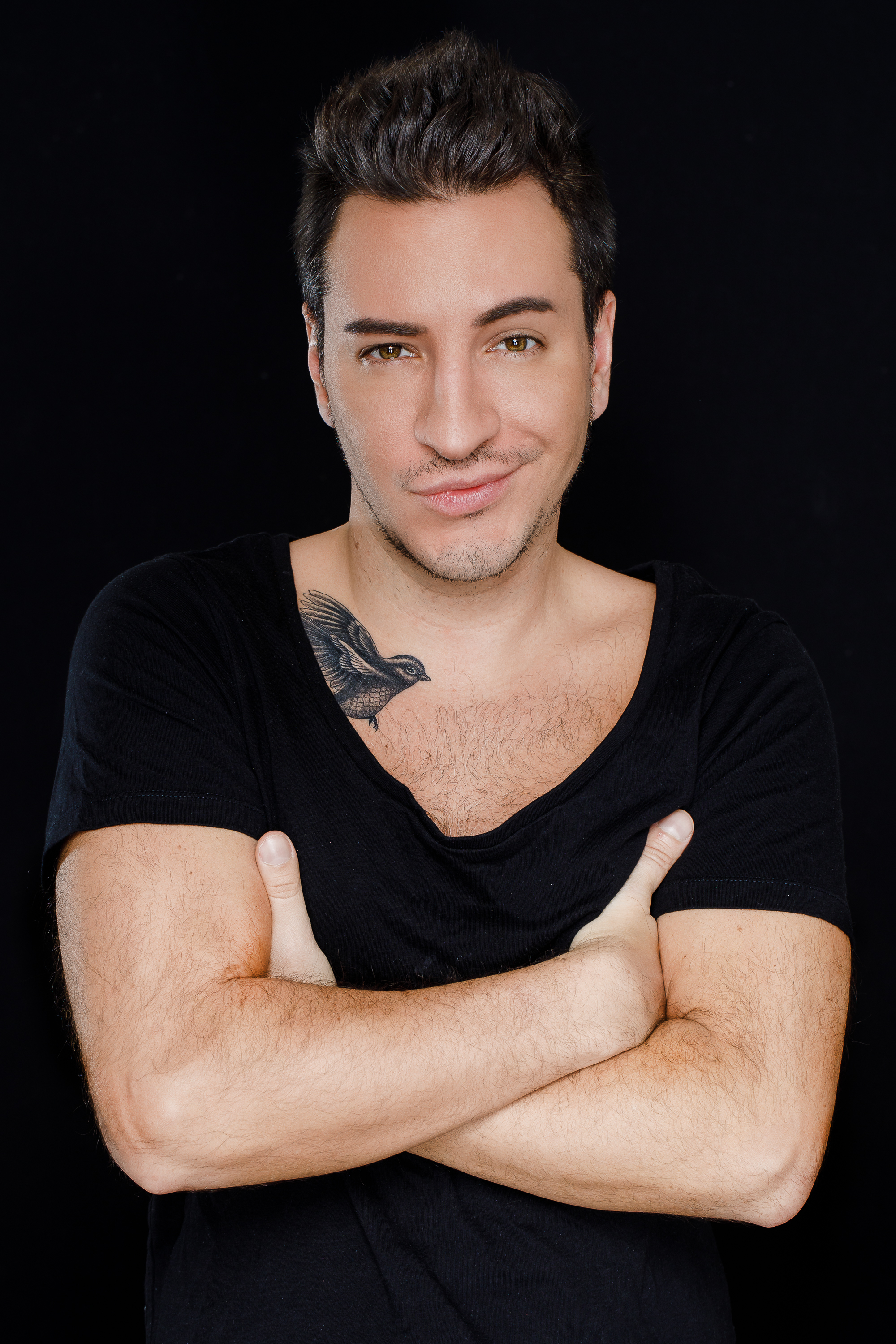
- Barta in 2019

Background information
- Born: Adam Steven Barta; September 21, 1979 (age 47); New York City, U.S.
- Genres: Pop, R&B, dance-pop
- Occupation: Singer
- Website: adambarta.com

Adam Steven Barta (born September 21, 1979) is an American singer from the Bronx, New York. He has had four charting singles on the Billboard Dance Chart and is known for his duets and viral videos with Alana Thompson (Honey Boo Boo) from Here Comes Honey Boo Boo, Farrah Abraham, Margaret Cho, Nadya Suleman (Octomom), Tan Mom, Eureka O'Hara, Mariah Lynn (from Love and Hip Hop New York), and Jonah Falcon.

Barta is also known for his collaborations with Kathy Sledge (of Sister Sledge) and music videos featuring Lisa Lampanelli that have landed him in TMZ. In 2017, he starred on the television series Dr. Miami. In 2018 he released a single called "Peep Me Tonight" with hip-hop star Mariahlynn. In 2018, he released the viral hit "Free 2 Be Me" with "Tan Mom" Patricia Krentcil.

== Career ==
=== Music ===
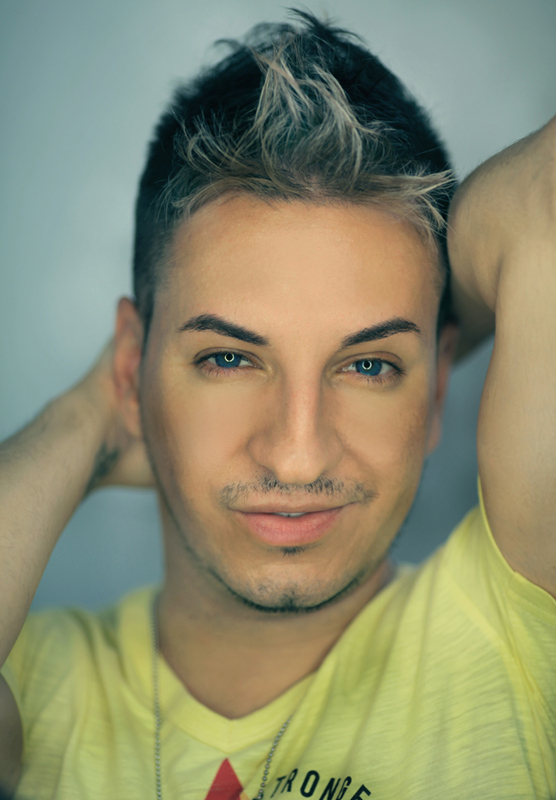
Barta in 2012

Barta's first single, "I Wanna Hold You", was produced by Mike Rizzo and was picked up on Abercrombie & Fitch's official playlist. It was Barta's first charting Billboard Dance Chart single and hit No. 55 on the chart. EsNtion Records signed Barta to a record deal for which his first single was "Standing in the Rain," with DJ Russ Harris. His music video hit the Number 1 spot on Logo's Click List in August, and was one of the top 10 videos of 2007. He was named favorite Click List artist of 2007 and made No. 96 on AfterElton.com's Hot 100 for 2008. His video was also picked up internationally on Canada's Only Dance Channel. The music video for "Standing in the Rain" premiered October 1, 2008, on Logo network's new mainstream dance/pop show Pop Lab, hosted by Solange and Lady Gaga. Barta hosted the Spring Break episode of Pop Lab on March 11.

In September 2009, his music video for "Standing in the Rain" was voted No. 1 on Logo's Ultimate Sexiest Music Video Countdown. The music video for "VIP" was filmed in December 2009 and contains cameos from The Real World: Hollywood's Nick Brown, Project Runway's Nicholas Putvinski, Michael Musto, Reina, and Jipsta. It premiered on Pop Lab on Logo on April 13, 2010. "VIP" was featured on the premiere of season 6 episode of The Bad Girls Club and also on The Real World: Las Vegas. In January 2011, he was featured on the show Face to Face with Ke$ha on the HERE! Network, although the two were not filmed together.

His next single was with Kathy Sledge (lead singer of Sister Sledge), a dance song produced by Mike Rizzo and Mr. Mig, called "Give Yourself Up (To The Music)." It was released on June 14 on Ingrooves/Universal Dist. Sledge performed it on The Oprah Winfrey Show in April to promote it. In September, the song debuted on the Billboard club chart at #45*. In August, Barta filmed a music video starring reality celebrities Kim Granatell of The Real Housewives of New Jersey, Miguel Allure from Jerseylicious, Tonye 'Tone Tone' Albanese from Cake Boss, Jack Mackenroth from Project Runway, and Robin Kassner from Millionaire Matchmaker. The video featured Sledge's daughter Kristin. In May 2012 he released the music video for his single "Q&A" featuring Lisa Lampanelli, Michael Musto, Ro Bear (from NY Ink), Hailey Glassman, Kerry Schwartz, Tone Tone (from Cake Boss), Harry Legg, JC Alvarez, Ryan Nikulas (from The A-List: New York on Logo). Shortly after in June, he signed with Gina Rodriguez of DD Entertainment. It was then announced he would be heading into the recording studio for a new single with Nadya Suleman (Octomom), after she appeared in an alternate cut of the "Q&A" music video where she was heard saying, "Let's do a duet...on my new album!" He recorded with Suleman on June 20, at Audiomaxx Studios in Cherry Hill, NJ. The song was produced by Mr. Mig and Mike Rizzo. Barta's song with Suleman was supposed to be called "Meet Me on the Dance Floor" and was slated to be released in August on Global Groove Entertainment. Barta went on "TMZ Live" in July 2012 to promote the song and talk about what it was like to record with Octomom. In August, TMZ released a controversial CD cover featuring Barta holding Octomom's breasts while she was wearing a rosary on a bed, surrounded by crosses. The pair claimed they were inspired by Madonna. The new release date for the single was also announced as September 4, 2012, and the name was changed to "Sexy Party." In October, he engaged in a heated debate for the online website deeyoon.com with Angelina Pivarnick from Jersey Shore in which he defended same-sex marriage. JWoww came to his defense, slamming Pivarnick, who later made a public apology. Then in December, he released a single with Pivarnick called "Serendipity," which the pair said was to promote equality. The song was produced by Billboard producers Majik Boys.

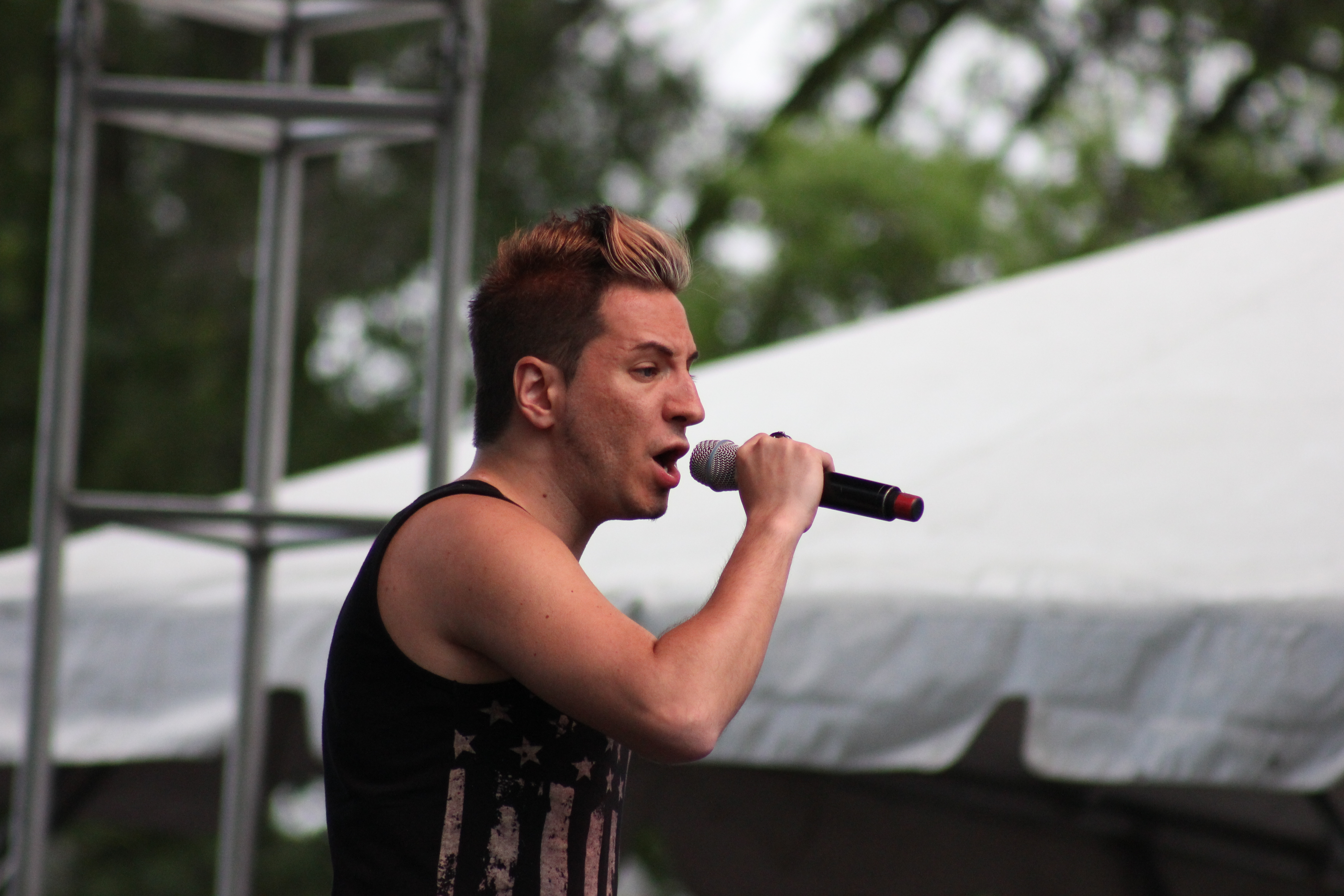
Barta performing in Washington D.C. in 2013

In 2013 he starred in three viral music videos. He also starred in Tan Mom's music video which was also called "the worst [music] video ever." His music video with Jonah Falcon for their song "It's Too Big" was featured on VH1's Best Week Ever. He appeared twice on the Howard Stern show, with both Tan Mom and Falcon, on which Stern declared he was "making a niche" for himself in entertainment. In 2013 he released a parody of the George Michael & Aretha Franklin duet "I Knew You Were Waiting for Me," called "You Seemed Shady to Me" with Pandora Boxx from RuPaul's Drag Race, which hit No. 46 on the iTunes Comedy Charts. He also released a song with Tan Mom on which he was featured called "Life of the Party," which E! News called "bad...really bad." He then released a song and music video with Myla Sinanaj called "I'm No Angel." Barta also released another controversial song with Sydney Leathers called "Weinerizer," which centered on Leathers' illicit sexting affair with NYC mayoral candidate Anthony Weiner.

In January 2014 he released a song "Justified" with Toby Sheldon, dedicated to Justin Bieber. In February 2014, he released the single "See U Next Tuesday" with comedian Margaret Cho. It hit the top 75 on the iTunes comedy singles chart. In February 2015 it was announced Barta was releasing a new song and music video called "Movin Up" with Alana Thompson (aka Honey Boo Boo) and her sister Pumpkin. The song was released in 2016 and Barta was credited as creating the viral craze "the Honey Boo Boo bop".

In 2016, he formed the group "The Pool Kids" with dance artist SK8, and the pair achieved a Billboard dance club charting single, "Heartbreak Hotline", peaking at No. 17 on the chart. In 2017 he appeared on WE tv's Dr. Miami, where he got surgery, and also collaborated on a new song "Flawless", after the doctor told him it was his dream to be on the Billboard charts. The single debuted on the Billboard dance singles chart in April and peaked at No. 24. It also peaked at No. 32 on the Billboard dance club chart. He also released a song and music video with RuPaul's Drag Race season 9 contestant, Eureka O'Hara called "Body Positivity"'. The music video featured Farrah Abraham, who he previously had been suing for music royalties.

In 2018, it was announced he was releasing a single with Mariahlynn from Love and Hip Hop New York, with Dr. Miami, and featuring Reina, called "Peep Me Tonight".

Later that year, he released a new single called "Free 2 Be Me" with Patricia Krentcil (also known as Tan Mom), and performed it live on the Howard Stern Show. Later in the year, Barta appeared on the Stern Show playing Family Feud with Patricia and won. Howard announced the music video had achieved over 500,000 views in a few days.

=== Other work ===
Barta started his acting career doing off-Broadway theatre. He played Tash in Befriending Beau, alongside Eric Millegan. In 1999, Barta appeared in the Comedy Central series Strangers with Candy.

In 2012, he filmed scenes for his music video "Q&A" with Celebrity Apprentice's Lisa Lampanelli at the Night of a Thousand Gowns, in NYC, where he also was a headliner with her.

In 2022, he created, starred in and executive produced the series #THEDISH, with "Mama June" Shannon, and featuring Tammie Brown. It premiered August 30 on Apple TV and Vudu. On October 1, it debuted on Tubi TV. In August, Shannon went on to sue Barta on a live televised appearance, and won credit as an executive producer on the series.

== Chart singles ==
Year	Song	U.S Club Play	U.S. Dance Airplay	U.S. Dance Sales
2006	"I Wanna Hold You"	55	-	-
2011	"Give Yourself Up"	20	-	-
2016	"Heartbreak Hotline" (as The Pool Kids)	17	-	-
2017	"Flawless"	32	-	24
2019	"No Day Like Today" (with Lovari)	28	-	-
