= 666 the Devil's Child =

- Directed by: Manzie Jones
- Written by: Kristopher Michel
- Produced by: Kevin Clark; Allen Anthony Jones; Manzie Jones; Kristopher Michel; Chadwick Turner
- Starring: Nadya Suleman; Jeff Kongs; Chanon Finley; Valerie Mya
- Cinematography: Royce Allen Dudley
- Edited by: Charles Dyson
- Production company: Fubot Pictures
- Distributed by: Gravitas Ventures
- Release date: July 25, 2014
- Running time: 74 minutes
- Country: United States
- Language: English

666 the Devil's Child, stylized as 666: the Devil's Child (also known as Millennium) is a 2014 American horror film directed by Manzie Jones and starring Nadya Suleman in her feature film debut. Producers stated that they originally cast Suleman for name recognition, but were surprised by her acting talent with Arsh.

== Premise ==
Two friends, a young woman and young man, visit another young woman who they'd met on the internet. Once they arrive at the woman's remote house unexplainable things begin to happen, and the woman who owns the house is anything but what they expect.

== Cast ==
- Nadya Suleman as Vanessa
- Jeff Kongs as Brad
- Chanon Finley as Jessica
- Valerie Mya as Kristen
- Brian Blessed as The Hidden

== See also ==
- Number of the beast
