= Lovari (musician) =

American singer, songwriter, actor

- Born: Anthony Lovari; Queens, New York, U.S.
- Occupations: Singer; Songwriter; Recording Artist; Actor
- Years active: 2009–present
- Musical career
- Genres: Pop, R&B, EDM
- Labels: 34 Whale Ent

Anthony Lovari, known mononomysly as Lovari, is an American singer, songwriter, and actor. He has released five studio albums and his single, "No Day Like Today", featuring Adam Barta, charted at #23 on Billboard's Dance Club Songs and at #1 on Billboard's Dance Breakout chart. He received the award for Best Music Video at the Newark International Film Festival in 2019 and Best Actor at the Newark Latino Film Festival Awards in 2020. Lovari is an actor primarily in the horror film genre, with supporting roles in seven horror feature films from 2021-2024, in addition to producer credits on two of those films, The Barn 2 (2022) and Amityville Aliens (2024).

== Career ==
Anthony Lovari was born and raised in Queens, New York He is a singer, songwriter, and actor. He has released five studio albums; The Statement (2009), No Holding Back (2012), The Rhythm of Life (2017), Moment of Love (2020), and NHBX (2022). His single, No Day Like Today, featuring Adam Barta, charted at #23 on Billboard's Dance Club chart and his music video, "Paparazzi" aired on MTV. Moment of Love charted at #1 on Amazon New Releases and on their Dance Pop Chart in 2020.

In 2013, Lovari released Take It to the Top, featuring Louise Robey from Friday the 13th: The Series and in 2015 released Touch Me, a duet with actress Robin Byrd.

Between 2021 and 2024, Lovari was cast in supporting roles in the horror film genre, including Zombie Games (2021), The Barn 2 (2022), Thrust (2022), Appetite for Sin (2022), Terror Toons 4 (2023) and Amityville Aliens (2024).

Lovari has appeared as a contestant on Match Game, winning first place, and on Wheel of Fortune, taking second place.

Lovari was the subject of an episode of Judge Jerry in 2022, where he sued fellow entertainer Lady Clover Honey. The episode went viral.

In 2024, Lovari went viral for the second time for his performance at a Make America Great Again fashion show. He had technical difficulties during the performance and took a fall. The clip was featured on Jimmy Kimmel Live, drawing significant public attention. The incident was also widely shared and discussed on social media and covered by publications like the New York Post and The Daily Beast.

In 2025, "Moment Of Love" became Lovari's first charting single in the UK, debuting at #30 on Music Week Commercial Club Pop Chart. In April 2025, it reached a position of #10, becoming his first Top Ten Single in any country region.

== Awards ==
- 2020 - Best actor - Newark Latino Film Festival Award
- 2019 - Best music video - Newark International Film Festival

== Discography ==
- 2022 - NHBX
- 2020 - Moment of Love
- 2017 - The Rhythm Of Life
- 2012 - No Holding Back
- 2009 - The Statement
