= Gina Rodriguez (pornographic film actress) =

American former pornographic film actress

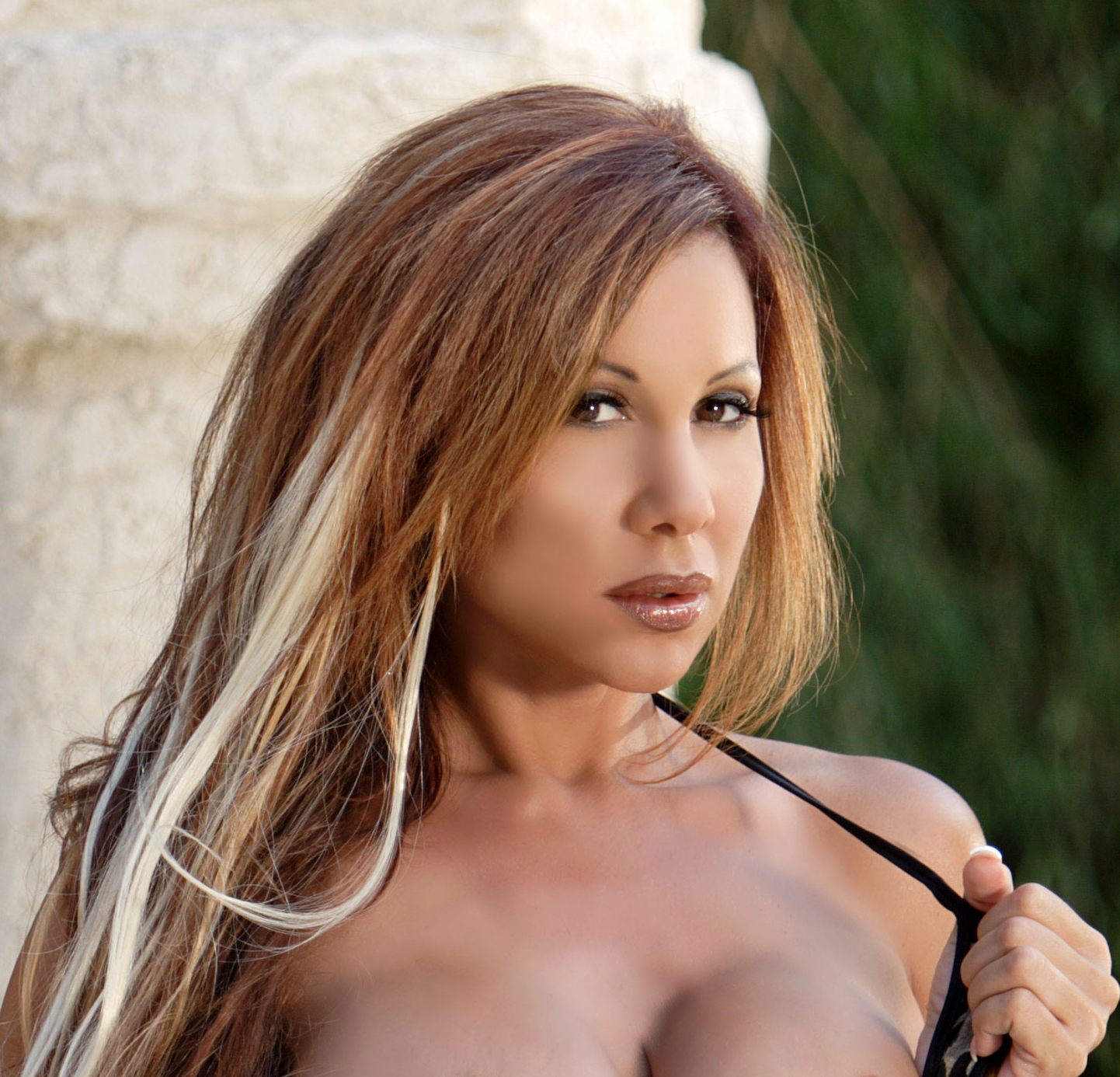
- Rodriguez in 2006
- Born: 1967 (age 58–59)
- Other name: Demi Delia
- Occupations: Pornographic film actress; talent agent
- Years active: 1992–present
- Height: 5 ft 3 in (1.60 m)
- Spouse(s): Richard Snail (divorced); Rod Rodriguez (divorced); Randy Spears (divorced)
- Children: 2
- Website: gitoni.com

Gina Rodriguez (born 1967) is an American talent agent and former pornographic film actress known for representing "D-list" celebrities such as Nadya Suleman and Michael Lohan. In 2017 she starred in and executive produced the WEtv docu-series Mama June: From Not to Hot.

From 2011 to 2017, Rodriguez managed Stormy Daniels, and cooperated with FBI and was heavily involved in the deal with Keith Davidson regarding President Donald Trump. In 2018, she was a subject of the book, Full Disclosure, written by Stormy Daniels and published by St. Martin's Publishing Group. In 2020, she was a subject of the book, The Fixers: The Bottom-Feeders, Crooked Lawyers, Gossipmongers, and Porn Stars Who Created the 45th President, written by reporters Joe Palazzolo and Michael Rothfeld and published by Random House.

== Career ==
As an adult film performer, Rodriguez appeared in over 50 adult films under the name Demi Delia. Rodriguez established her publicity business in 2009 after leaving porn business and having divorced for the third time. Starting in June 2009, along with her two children, she starred in the family's short-lived, web-based reality show, Mommy XXX on Crackle.

Rodriguez created her own management company, DD Entertainment (later known as GR Media), which represented women who notoriously claimed to be mistresses of various celebrities. In 2012, she launched DialAStar.com a phone service which allowed fans to phone celebrities. As Nadya Suleman's manager, she produced and marketed the pornographic film Octomom Home Alone.

In 2017, she co-founded GiToni Productions, and executive produced her first reality TV show, "Mama June: From Not to Hot" on WE tv, on which she also starred.

In 2020, she executive produced "Happily Ever Altered" which premiered July 22, 2020, on Lifetime TV.

== Personal life ==
Rodriguez was born in November 1967, daughter of an Italian-American mother and Michael "Micky" Anthony Delia, a member of the Mexican Mafia. She was raised in the San Fernando Valley in California. She did not meet her biological father until age 22, and was known as Gina Dice, after her adopted father, Donald Oliver Dice.

Rodriguez married and had two children with Richard Snail, who worked in television production. After divorcing Snail, she married Rod Rodriguez, a member of the Los Angeles Police Department. They divorced in 2002. Afterwards she began dating veteran porn actor Randy Spears, who was a customer at a tanning salon she owned.

In April 2024, archived text messages from October 2016 between Rodriguez and Stormy Daniels' lawyer Keith Davidson were shown during Donald Trump's New York criminal trial, indicating that Rodriguez was among those who encouraged Davidson to reach out to Michael Cohen concerning what would become a $130,000 payment to Daniels for her silence about an affair Daniels had with Donald Trump.
