= Octomom Home Alone =

- DVD cover for Octomom Home Alone
- Directed by: Brad Armstrong
- Starring: Nadya Suleman
- Production company: Wicked Pictures
- Release date: 16 July 2012
- Running time: 29 minutes
- Country: United States
- Language: English

Octomom Home Alone is a 2012 pornographic film featuring prominent American mother Nadya Suleman, also known as "Octomom", masturbating. The DVD was released on 16 July 2012 by Wicked Pictures and drew media attention given Suleman's celebrity and recognition from the AVN Awards.

== Production ==
In 2009, Suleman gave birth to the Suleman octuplets. News of the octuplets caused an international media sensation. Public response was largely negative, including death threats.

Although under severe financial pressure from raising 14 children, Suleman had publicly stated she would not do pornography. She explained that stance, saying "I've been celibate for 14 years and I'm a regular church-goer." She also claimed she had never masturbated. However, in 2012 Suleman filed for bankruptcy in federal court, claiming a $1 million debt. She thus reversed her earlier position, saying "If it's a job, and it's a well-paying job, and it's going to allow me to get out of here and move in a very safe, huge home that they deserve, I'm going to do it." She was paid a five-figure amount and monthly royalties.

Under director Brad Armstrong, Suleman filmed her scenes in a San Fernando Valley mansion. She was reportedly nervous upon her arrival, but calmed after speaking with other adult performers. The producers also showed Suleman pornographic films to prepare her and gave her advice on her performance. Suleman also credited her manager, pornographic actress Gina Rodriguez of DD Entertainment (now GR Media), for producing and marketing the video.

Suleman later said of the video, "It was such a positive experience for me and helped me embrace my sexuality." She also described the scenes as "empowering and liberating".

In January 2013, Suleman went back on welfare, leading to questions of whether she may have to make more pornographic films.

== Reception ==
Octomom Home Alone was nominated for four AVN Awards, namely Best Celebrity Sex Tape, Best Solo Release, Best DVD Extras and Best Marketing Campaign. It ultimately won the Best Celebrity Sex Tape category, over competition by Leola Bell and Phil Varone. However, it lost Best Solo Release to All Natural Glamour Solos, II.

Suleman had reportedly said after the nominations that "I am so proud of my video Octomom Home Alone and I am more than honored to find out it was nominated so many times!" She also said she would be at the award show, but later Gina Rodriguez said Suleman would not go. On her win for Best Celebrity Sex Tape, she said "This is fantastic, what an honor. Hopefully this will open the doors to more opportunities."

Alexander Espinoza of XCritic gave the film one out of five stars, saying it was disappointing and did not deserve its award nominations. Adult actress Amber Peach critiqued the film, saying "The whole video from a porn standpoint just looks awkward and uncomfortable... and don't get me started on the part where she's lying naked in a pile of baby clothes, that's just disturbing." Conversely, Rob Perez of XCritic recommended the film, stating, "Octomom looks really damn good."

== Controversy ==
According to The Huffington Post, the film cast doubt among the public on Suleman's parenting abilities.
