= Mama June: Family Crisis =

American reality television series

- Seasons 1–3 logo
- Also known as: Mama June: From Not to Hot; Mama June: Road to Redemption
- Genre: Reality television
- Starring: Shannon family
- Country of origin: United States
- Original language: English
- No. of seasons: 8
- No. of episodes: 106

Production
- Executive producers: Adam Freeman; Adam Reed; Angela Molloy; Erin Richards; Gina Rodriguez; Lauren P. Gellert; Moriah Muse; Tim Cohen-Laurie
- Running time: 42–52 minutes
- Production company: Thinkfactory Media

Original release
- Network: We TV
- Release: February 24, 2017 – present

Related
- Here Comes Honey Boo Boo

Mama June: Family Crisis (formerly titled Mama June: From Not to Hot in seasons 1–3, Mama June: From Not to Hot – Family Crisis in season 4, and Mama June: Road to Redemption in season 5) is an American reality television series that airs on We TV. The show premiered on February 24, 2017, and is a spin-off of the TLC reality series Here Comes Honey Boo Boo.

== Production ==
The show's first three seasons documented June "Mama June" Shannon's weight loss transformation from 460 to 160 pounds (209 to 73 kg). On March 13, 2019, June Shannon and her partner at the time, Eugene Doak, were arrested and charged with felony possession of drugs and drug paraphernalia at a gas station in Alabama, with Doak facing an additional charge of domestic violence. Following this, the fourth season premiered on March 27, 2020, and saw the series rebranded as Mama June: From Not to Hot – Family Crisis.

The fifth season premiered on March 19, 2021, and was rebranded as Mama June: Road to Redemption, with the "From Not to Hot" subtitle removed entirely. The show was rebranded back to Mama June: Family Crisis from the sixth to seventh season. In season 8 it’s rebranded back to the name Mama June: from Not to Hot on promos & with a fresh new logo, & every episode started only with the title MAMA JUNE & without adding the From Not to Hot subtitle.

== Cast ==
=== Main ===
Cast Member	Seasons										
Cast Member	1	2a	2b	3	4	5	6a	6b	6c	7	8
June "Mama June" Shannon	Main	Main	Main	Recurring	Main	Main	Main	Main	Main	Main	Main
Alana "Honey Boo Boo" Thompson	Main	Main	Main	Main	Main	Main	Main	Main	Main	Main	Main
Lauryn "Pumpkin" Shannon	Main	Main	Main	Main	Main	Main	Main	Main	Main	Main	Main
Gina Rodriguez	Main	Main	Recurring	Recurring		Guest					
Mike "Sugar Bear" Thompson	Main	Main	Main	Main	Main	Guest					
Jennifer Lamb	Main	Main	Main	Main	Main						
Joshua "Josh" Efird		Recurring	Main	Main	Main	Main	Main	Main	Main	Main	Main
Ella Grace Efird		Main	Main	Main	Main	Main	Main	Main	Main	Main	Main
Eugene "Geno" Doak		Main	Main	Recurring	Main	Guest					
Jo 'Doe Doe' Shannon	Recurring	Recurring	Recurring	Main	Main	Recurring	Recurring	Recurring	Recurring		
Jessica "Chubbs" Shannon			Guest	Guest	Main	Main	Main	Main	Main	Main	Main
Justin Stroud						Recurring	Main	Main	Main	Main	Main
Shyann McCant						Recurring	Recurring	Recurring	Recurring	Recurring	Main
Dralin Carswell						Recurring	Main	Main	Main	Main	Guest
Anna 'Chickadee' Cardwell							Recurring	Recurring	Recurring		
Kaitlyn Shannon							Recurring	Recurring	Recurring	Main	Guest
Darrin Kitchens										Recurring	Main
Trina McCant											Main

== Episodes ==
=== Series overview ===
Season	Episodes		Originally released	
Season	Episodes		First released	Last released
1	7		February 24, 2017	April 7, 2017
2	19	8	January 12, 2018	March 2, 2018
2	19	11	June 15, 2018	August 24, 2018
3	11		March 15, 2019	May 31, 2019
4	12		March 27, 2020	June 26, 2020
5	22	12	March 19, 2021	June 11, 2021
5	22	10	May 13, 2022	July 22, 2022
6	26	10	May 5, 2023	July 14, 2023
6	26	10	February 9, 2024	April 12, 2024
6	26	6	June 14, 2024	July 19, 2024
7	8		May 30, 2025	July 25, 2025
8	10		March 13, 2026	May 15, 2026

=== Season 1 (2017) ===
No. overall	No. in season	Title	Original release date	US viewers (millions)
1	1	"Thin-Tervention"	February 24, 2017	1.42
Mama June is blindsided by Sugar Bear's shocking engagement. And when a revenge diet fails and a hot date bails, June considers major surgery.
2	2	"Operation Tummy Boo Boo"	March 3, 2017	1.14
Mama June goes under the knife for her total body transformation. Disaster strikes when June drives blind on a blind date. When she cheats on her new workout program, June gets ambushed.
3	3	"Here Comes The Bridezilla"	March 10, 2017	1.00
Mama June reveals shocking results with the help of new trainer, Kenya. Alana keeps a big secret from Mama June finally meets Sugar Bear's fiancée and it does not go well.
4	4	"Let Boo Boo Eat Cake"	March 17, 2017	1.12
Sugar Bear's fiancée Jennifer sabotages June's weight loss progress. June goes on a date. Mama's stress eating sparks surgery dilemma. June and Jennifer go to war over Alana.
5	5	"Mama Frankenstein"	March 24, 2017	1.22
Mama June must drop 15 pounds in two weeks. When her junk food stash is exposed, June has a meltdown and is pushed over the edge. Alana and Pumpkin vow to save her, even if it means they must diet too.
6	6	"Mama June's Big Reveal"	March 31, 2017	1.67
A surprise ambush gets June back on track. Jennifer drops a wedding bomb. At the final photo shoot reveal, Mama June is unrecognizable.
7	7	"Red Hot Mama"	April 7, 2017	1.61
Sugar Bear re-invites June to his wedding. The big day descends into chaos as tornado warnings and June's arrival catch everyone by surprise. June's health takes a sudden turn.

=== Season 2 (2018) ===
No. overall	No. in season	Title	Original release date	US viewers (millions)
Part 1
8	1	"Mama's Big Fat Secret"	January 12, 2018	0.90
Honey Boo Boo wants Mama June to enter a beauty pageant but June is focused on her new mystery man! Sugar Bear and Jennifer scheme to get more time with Alana and they’ll do anything to get it!
9	2	"A Pumpkin in the Oven"	January 19, 2018	0.68
Mama is shocked by an unplanned pregnancy. Alana convinces June to start training for a beauty pageant. Sugar Bear and Jennifer hire a lawyer.
10	3	"Go-Go Juice Gonna Make Mama Win"	January 26, 2018	0.76
June and ex Sugar Bear face off at mediation! Jennifer schemes to get June out of her life for good while Josh gets the wrath of Mama. Pageant practice with Honey Boo Boo means gulping down go-go juice.
11	4	"Boo-Boo ... You're Fired!"	February 2, 2018	0.72
Alana is blindsided when Mama hires a new coach. Feeling neglected, Alana runs away! Josh and Geno move in. Jennifer plots to get a DNA test.
12	5	"Project Runaway"	February 9, 2018	0.78
Alana runs away to Sugar Bear’s. After a fight with Mama, pregnant Pumpkin moves out. Jennifer collects DNA samples. June faces health emergency.
13	6	"Blind-Sided"	February 16, 2018	0.76
June is rushed to the hospital for emergency surgery. A pregnant Pumpkin has a breakdown. The Alana and Sugar Bear DNA results are in!
14	7	"All Eyes on Mama"	February 23, 2018	0.85
June’s eye surgery has failed and panic strikes! Sugar Bear finds the DNA results and loses it! Mama has a breakdown at Pumpkin’s ultrasound.
15	8	"Make Womb for Baby"	March 2, 2018	0.94
Pumpkin goes into labor. Mama risks her eyesight to make it back in time for the birth.
Part 2
16	9	"New Baby in Town"	June 15, 2018	0.78
Pumpkin and Josh bring home their daughter, Ella-Grace. Jennifer tries to tell Mike she is getting a weight-reduction surgery. Alana runs away to Dodo's house after her room is converted into Ella's nursery. Jelly Bean dies, and a funeral is thrown.
17	10	"Is He The One?"	June 22, 2018	0.78
Alana is disappointed over the pageant cancellation. Mama catches wedding fever and struggles with her weight gain. Jennifer gets gastric bypass surgery, but will Sugar Bear stick around?
18	11	"Honey Boo Boo Is Back!"	June 29, 2018	0.75
Josh proposes to Pumpkin and they take engagement photos. June poses for a lingerie photo shoot and hopes to get Geno in a marrying mood. June and Alana prepare to enter a pageant as a mother and daughter duo. Jennifer frets that Mike will not like her when she loses weight.
19	12	"Tater Totta & Forklift Freida"	July 6, 2018	0.702
Pumpkin plans a large wedding and Josh worries about cost. Pageant coach J.J. arrives to train June and Alana and he has his work cut out for him. June, Mike and Jennifer go to mediation while Geno and Alana sit in the waiting room. When they reach an impasse, June wants to bring in Alana.
20	13	"Mama's Big Proposal"	July 13, 2018	0.82
Alana reads her letter to Mike and says she wants visits supervised by Geno. Jennifer approaches a weight-loss milestone but Mike doesn't seem supportive. June and Alana register for the pageant and encounter mean girls. June gets tired of waiting for Geno to propose and pops the question herself.
21	14	"Five, Six, Seven, Ate!"	July 20, 2018	0.75
Geno responds that he's not going anywhere. Alana visits Mike and has a good time until he asks whether June helped write her letter. June and Alana learn a dance for the talent portion of the pageant. June's agent creates a subscription food service for her. June offers to pay for Pumpkin and Josh's wedding, if it is held in Las Vegas.
22	15	"Say Yes to the Pageant Dress"	July 27, 2018	N/A
Pumpkin agrees to marry in Las Vegas and use their money for counseling instead. June selects a pageant dress but it is larger than she expected. Mike apologizes to Alana. Alana trains for the pageant and invites Mike and Jennifer to attend. Jennifer hits a weight-loss goal. June is dismayed when she weighs in at 200.
23	16	"Worst Day in Pageantry"	August 3, 2018	0.82
Mike wants an unsupervised visit and Jennifer calls Geno to see if he can persuade June to allow it. June overhears and when Geno takes Mike's side, June gets upset and Geno leaves. Alana talks about her pageant anxieties at Jelly Bean's grave. Alana balks at going, but Mike convinces her as he did when she was younger.
24	17	"Stage Fright & Pageant Fight"	August 10, 2018	0.93
Geno returns and tells Josh that he doesn't want to marry June but planned to wait until after the pageant to tell her. Josh asks Geno to consider being his best man. The pageant begins and all eyes are on June and Alana for their talent presentation.
25	18	"And The Pageant Winners Are..."	August 17, 2018	N/A
June and Alana struggle on the talent presentation but ace the interview and are first runners-up. Alana wins Miss Congeniality. Geno and the family fly to Las Vegas. Poolside, they find that Mike and Jennifer are spending their honeymoon there (at Alana's invitation). Geno is ready to tell June what he is thinking.
26	19	"The Vegas Hillbillies"	August 24, 2018	1.03
Geno reiterates that he is not going anywhere. June tells Doe Doe that she "may or may not" have hired an Elvis impersonator to marry her and Geno. June and Jennifer start to find common ground. Geno leaves the "Mama June's Southern Treats" launch party which upsets June. Pumpkin and Josh get married. June forgets to cancel the Elvis impersonator, who shows up at the after-ceremony dinner. June and Geno have a serious talk. In a season-ending cliffhanger, June says she loves Geno and notes that Alana and Pumpkin are both calling him their stepfather, but if he does not intend to marry her someday then she needs to leave him.

=== Season 3 (2019) ===
No. overall	No. in season	Title	Original release date	US viewers (millions)
27	1	"Dance with the Stars"	March 15, 2019	0.65
28	2	"From Not to Knocked Up"	March 22, 2019	0.67
29	3	"Geno 911"	March 29, 2019	0.70
30	4	"Love After Lockup"	April 5, 2019	0.75
31	5	"Fit Farm Wars"	April 12, 2019	0.78
32	6	"Let Them Eat Fat Cake"	April 19, 2019	0.82
33	7	"Who Is Sexting Geno?"	April 26, 2019	0.77
34	8	"Geno's Free Ride"	May 3, 2019	0.75
35	9	"Mama's Breakdown"	May 10, 2019	0.76
36	10	"Losing Mama June"	May 17, 2019	0.90
37	11	"The Intervention"	May 31, 2019	0.92

=== Season 4 (2020) ===
No. overall	No. in season	Title	Original release date	US viewers (millions)
38	1	"Family Crisis"	March 27, 2020	0.75
Nobody has heard from June for two months, and life goes on. Gina invites Pumpkin, Alana and Ella to her house in LA. She also invites Jennifer and Sugar Bear. Doe Doe goes to Alabama resolving to bring June back home, with Big Mike coming along for muscle. They enter a casino where June has been seen, and shortly after an ambulance arrives.
39	2	"Where Is Mama June?"	April 3, 2020	0.72
The ambulance passes by. Nobody at the casino will talk to Doe Doe and Big Mike. They go to lunch, and a waitress who is a fan of the show connects them with a casino worker who tells them that June was kicked out for disorderly conduct. Gina sends Alana to a fashion audition, where she gets interest from five designers. Jennifer and Sugar Bear take Alana to the beach, where Alana admits that she is disappointed that June never calls her. Doe Doe and Big Mike go to the Macon County Sheriff, who begins to share some information on the case.
40	3	"The Stakeout"	April 10, 2020	0.86
The Sheriff says that June appeared in court to ask that the domestic violence charge be dropped, which was granted. As Alana prepares for the fashion show, she is reminded of her disappointment after being eliminated from Dancing with the Stars: Juniors, but the designers give her encouragement. Jennifer goes for her Star Magazine interview and photo shoot, but is annoyed that they seem more interested in how she feels about June than about her achievements. Following a suggestion from the Sheriff and a bartender, Doe Doe and Big Mike stake out a motel near the casino. After midnight, a Suburban with Georgia plates arrives, and Doe Doe approaches it.
41	4	"Mama's Crash Landing"	April 17, 2020	0.88
Geno and June were not in the car. Out of leads, Doe Doe and Big Mike decide to go home and wait for June there. As a professional courtesy, a rep from The Blast tells Gina that he has evidence that Geno is sexting other women. Josh flies to LA. Despite some misgivings, Pumpkin agrees to take Ella Grace to a photo shoot. During dinner, Alana excuses herself to go to the restroom and overhears a standup comedy act upstairs that makes fun of June. Alana decides to try her hand at standup and struggles to put together enough material. TMZ reports that Geno crashed the car into June's garage and June is seen trying to pick Geno up from the ground.
42	5	"Mama's Cry for Help"	April 24, 2020	0.99
The family tells Alana about June. Alana is apprehensive about going back to public school after being homeschooled. All return to Georgia. June reaches out to the producers and asks to be sent to rehab. They choose a center in LA so it's too far for Geno to easily drive there and get her. Pumpkin shares the news with Alana. Jennifer and Sugar Bear start to discuss asking for custody of Alana. The next morning, Alana goes to school but June does not go to rehab. Josh and Pumpkin debate whether to tell Alana and then do so. Alana is disappointed and goes to her room. She starts livestreaming and pretends to snort cocaine, which goes viral. Pumpkin worries what the consequences will be.
43	6	"Everything for Sale"	May 1, 2020	0.96
Pumpkin decides she needs professional help for Alana and reaches out to family therapist Dr. Ish. Josh takes Alana to a farm so she can experience hard work. Afterwards they have a family meeting where Alana says she wants to stay with Pumpkin and Josh and fears she is a burden to them, and they reassure her she is not. Jennifer prods Sugar Bear to go for custody. He is reluctant and tells the audience that he has something else going on. Two weeks later Josh tells Pumpkin and Alana that June is selling everything in her house, including their belongings.
44	7	"Mama's Court Orders"	May 8, 2020	0.98
A buyer with a hidden camera shows June, Geno and the state of her house. The Sheriff tells Doe Doe that June is due for arraignment on Friday morning. Alana tells Pumpkin that she likes being with her but would really rather be with June if she recovers. Sugar Bear reveals that he has erectile dysfunction, and he gets treated for it. Alana invites two friends for a sleepover, but one cancels because of the drama. On Friday, Doe Doe and many camera crews await June's arrival for court.
45	8	"Toddlers and Terror"	May 15, 2020	1.01
June misses her court date and it is rescheduled. Alana signs Ella up for a pageant. Big Mike tells Doe Doe that he has heard on the street that June owes money to the wrong people and she could be in trouble. Alana tells Jennifer about the pageant, and she promptly signs up her granddaughter Harper. After the pageant, June texts Pumpkin and warns her that people may be coming for them. Fearing for their safety, they rush home, pack and move to a hotel.
46	9	"Mama's Open House"	May 29, 2020	0.85
Josh and Pumpkin ponder their next move. Jennifer pushes Sugar Bear harder to take custody of Alana. Doe Doe goes to June's house to confront her, but finds that the garage is repaired, all the windows are open, the front door is unlocked and the house has been sold. Josh and Pumpkin decide to move to a house two hours away, but Alana is unhappy about changing schools. Jennifer receives her Star Magazine cover. Doe Doe attends June and Geno's arraignment, and says they pled not guilty and were ordered to bring an attorney to their next appearance.
47	10	"Mama's Coming"	June 5, 2020	1.01
Jennifer is disappointed with her magazine cover. Pumpkin delivers an ultimatum to June: either have a face-to-face meeting or say goodbye. June agrees to meet and says that the people have been paid. Jennifer and Sugar Bear file for full custody of Alana. Josh and Pumpkin move out of their apartment. On the drive to the meeting, June says that she and Geno have a job delivering luggage from the airport. Pumpkin and Dr. Ish prepare to meet with June at the production office.
48	11	"Face Off with Mama"	June 12, 2020	0.95
June explains her actions. Pumpkin insists on three conditions moving forward: that June gets a working phone, takes frequent drug tests and goes to inpatient rehab. June negotiates it to outpatient rehab. June takes a drug test and passes it. Later, Amber lets slip to Alana that Pumpkin met June. Alana is upset that she didn't know until Doe Doe explains that it was for her protection. June goes to a treatment session but Pumpkin believes her real motivation is to look good for the court and not to reunite with her family.
49	12	"Mama's Last Chance"	June 26, 2020	N/A
June soon quits the outpatient program. Gina arranges for June and Geno to enter an inpatient program. Doe Doe checks June's abandoned storage locker and retrieves trophies and photos, which shows June had a moment of clarity. Jennifer and Sugar Bear tell Alana about their plan to take custody, and Alana is upset by this. June and Geno successfully complete their 30-day program.

=== Season 5 (2021–2022) ===
No. overall	No. in season	Title	Original release date	US viewers (millions)
Part 1
50	1	"From Crisis to Recovery"	March 19, 2021	0.67
Approaching six months of sobriety, Mama June tries to reach out to Pumpkin and Alana. Meanwhile, Jessica moves in while Pumpkin and Josh's marriage hits rock bottom.
51	2	"Mama's Fighting Chance"	March 26, 2021	0.57
June and Geno are shook when forced to appear in court in less than 24 hours as they face major jail time; June goes searching for the girls; Doe Doe's caught in the crossfire; Sugar Bear suffers a medical emergency.
52	3	"Mama's Last Resort"	April 2, 2021	0.59
Mama fights to get her girls back and a call to Dr. Ish is her last resort; Sugar Bear goes behind Jennifer's back to reconnect with Alana; Josh is up in arms about the family reunion.
53	4	"The Reunion"	April 9, 2021	N/A
Pumpkin and Alana confront Mama June for the first time in a year in a reunion led by family therapist Dr. Ish; Mama June is faced with a surprise drug test; Geno does something unexpected that no one sees coming.
54	5	"Confronting Geno"	April 16, 2021	N/A
Pumpkin faces off with Geno after he pops up on Ella's surprise visit with Mama; Sugar Bear tries to repair his relationship with Alana but all hell breaks loose when Jennifer discovers his whereabouts.
55	6	"The Visit"	April 23, 2021	N/A
Pumpkin, Alana and Ella go down to Florida to visit Mama; Alana struggles to forgive Geno for the past; Jennifer gives Sugar Bear the boot, and Josh gets caught in the crossfire; Jessica busts Josh for hiding secrets from Pumpkin.
56	7	"No Place Like Home"	April 30, 2021	N/A
Alana convinces Pumpkin to let her stay with June and Geno in Florida for a few extra days. Pumpkin is not thrilled about not only Josh letting Sugar Bear stay at their house, but also him quitting his job, all without consulting first.
57	8	"Mama's Lying"	May 7, 2021	N/A
Josh drives down to Florida to fetch Alana and gets into a showdown with June, who is still in denial about the possibility of her facing jail time. Meanwhile, Pumpkin has shocking news.
58	9	"Another Pumpkin in the Oven"	May 14, 2021	0.74
Pumpkin keeps her pregnancy a secret; Josh is forced to call in a favor to get a new job; Alana's health issues worsen; Mama's blown away by a big surprise; as Ella's birthday approaches, unlikely guests are invited.
59	10	"Ella's Birthday Blow Up"	May 21, 2021	N/A
Ella's third birthday party turns into a battleground when Mama and Jennifer fight; Alana makes a run for it when Josh tricks her into a trip to the doctor; Jennifer drops a bomb on the family.
60	11	"Mama's Scared Straight!"	June 4, 2021	0.66
June's in denial about facing jail time; Geno's forced to go to the extremes to show Mama the harsh realities of life in prison; Pumpkin's gender reveal shocks the whole family; Mama's scared straight when ambushed by the police.
61	12	"Mama's Verdict"	June 11, 2021	0.72
Part 2
62	13	"Behind Closed Doors"	May 13, 2022	N/A
63	14	"Moving On and Moving In"	May 20, 2022	N/A
64	15	"Return to the Big Time"	June 3, 2022	N/A
65	16	"Sugar Mama"	June 10, 2022	N/A
66	17	"Sweet 16 and Mama's Not Missed"	June 17, 2022	N/A
67	18	"Sick and Tired"	June 24, 2022	N/A
68	19	"Boundaries"	July 1, 2022	0.69
69	20	"Too Little Too Late"	July 8, 2022	N/A
70	21	"What Happens in Vegas"	July 15, 2022	N/A
Special guest stars: Babydoll Beauty Couture Ladies
71	22	"Battle for Alana"	July 22, 2022	N/A

=== Season 6 (2023–2024) ===
No. overall	No. in season	Title	Original release date	US viewers (millions)
Part 1
72	1	"June's Big Secrets"	May 5, 2023	N/A
73	2	"Mama vs Mama"	May 12, 2023	N/A
74	3	"Bridal Shower Showdown"	May 19, 2023	N/A
75	4	"Knock Down Drag Out"	June 2, 2023	N/A
76	5	"Meet And Not So Greet"	June 9, 2023	N/A
77	6	"No Forgiveness Given"	June 16, 2023	N/A
78	7	"Mama's Last Chance"	June 23, 2023	N/A
79	8	"Therapy Weekend"	June 30, 2023	N/A
80	9	"If Josh Ain't Happy, Ain't Nobody Happy"	July 7, 2023	N/A
81	10	"June-Zilla"	July 14, 2023	N/A
Part 2
82	11	"June's Bombshells Keep on Comin'!"	February 9, 2024	N/A
83	12	"Reality Sets in"	February 16, 2024	N/A
84	13	"School Daze"	February 23, 2024	N/A
85	14	"To Go Or Not To Go"	March 1, 2024	N/A
86	15	"More Money, More Problems"	March 8, 2024	N/A
87	16	"Rocky Mountain High"	March 15, 2024	N/A
88	17	"You Dirty Dog"	March 22, 2024	N/A
89	18	"Mama Dearest"	March 29, 2024	N/A
90	19	"Hitting the Road"	April 5, 2024	N/A
91	20	"Birthday Shenanigans"	April 12, 2024	N/A
Part 3
92	21	"F Cancer"	June 14, 2024	0.47
93	22	"Coming to Terms"	June 21, 2024	0.49
94	23	"One Last Family Christmas"	June 28, 2024	0.46
95	24	"Forever, Anna"	July 5, 2024	0.55
96	25	"Moving Forward"	July 12, 2024	0.59
97	26	"Florida Farewell"	July 19, 2024	0.34

=== Season 7 (2025) ===
No. overall	No. in season	Title	Original release date	US viewers (millions)
98	1	"Love & Marriage"	May 30, 2025	N/A
99	2	"Pumpkin's Not Pumpkining"	June 6, 2025	N/A
100	3	"The D-Word"	June 13, 2025	N/A
101	4	"Court and Canoodling"	June 20, 2025	N/A
102	5	"Pumpkin On the Prowl"	June 27, 2025	N/A
103	6	"The Big D!"	July 11, 2025	N/A
104	7	"Heart Wrecked"	July 18, 2025	N/A
105	8	"Sister Or Snitch?"	July 25, 2025	N/A

=== Season 8 (2026) ===
No. overall	No. in season	Title	Original release date	US viewers (millions)
106	1	"Bank of Mama June"	March 13, 2026	N/A
107	2	"Battle of the Momzillas"	March 20, 2026	N/A
108	3	"Where There's Smoke..."	March 27, 2026	N/A
109	4	"Out June the Junebug"	April 3, 2026	N/A
110	5	"The Naked Truth"	April 10, 2026	N/A
111	6	"Check Mate"	April 17, 2026	N/A
112	7	"In Sickness and In Health?"	April 24, 2026	N/A
113	8	"Could You Marry Us?"	May 1, 2026	N/A
114	9	"What Happens in Florida..."	May 8, 2026	N/A
115	10	"Wedding Bells and Betrayals"	May 15, 2026	N/A

== Specials ==
Featured season	Title	Original release date	US viewers (millions)
1	"Too Big for TV"	April 14, 2017	1.11
1	"The Confrontation"	April 14, 2017	1.42
1	"XXL Edition: Red Hot Mama"	April 18, 2017	N/A
2	"Burning Questions"	January 5, 2018	0.49
2B	"Redneck Romance"	June 8, 2018	N/A
3	"Mama's Most Outrageous Moments"	March 15, 2019	0.34
3	"The Road to Intervention"	May 24, 2019	0.87
3	"A Look Back"	May 22, 2020	0.65
4	"Behind The Headlines"	June 19, 2020	N/A
5	"The Road So Far"	May 28, 2021	N/A
7	"Family Crisis: Sister Secrets Independence Day"	July 4, 2025	N/A
