= Toby Sheldon =

German songwriter, reality TV star

- Sheldon on Botched
- Born: Tobias Strebel; October 3, 1980; Nuremberg, West Germany
- Died: c. August 21, 2015 (aged 34); San Fernando Valley, California, U.S.
- Known for: Extreme body modification, television appearances

Tobias "Toby" Sheldon (born Tobias Strebel; October 3, 1980 – c. August 21, 2015) was a German songwriter who became a television reality star noted for having paid considerable amounts for plastic surgery (he himself estimated the total cost at over $100,000) in order to resemble singer Justin Bieber. He appeared on the television shows Botched on the E! network and My Strange Addiction on TLC. Some experts argued that Sheldon's obsession was a case of body dysmorphia. This topic was discussed in depth during his appearance alongside Justin Jedlica ("The Human Ken Doll") on the talk show Bethenny.

On August 21, 2015, Sheldon was found dead in a room at a Motel 6 in the San Fernando Valley, California, United States. Drugs were reportedly discovered at the scene. Sheldon was 34. He had last been seen in West Hollywood on August 18, 2015, and some reports have indicated that his disappearance may have been triggered by a break-up with his boyfriend. In July 2016, a coroner confirmed his death was triggered from multiple drug intoxication.
