= Tanning dependence =

Physical or psychological dependence on tanning or sunbathing

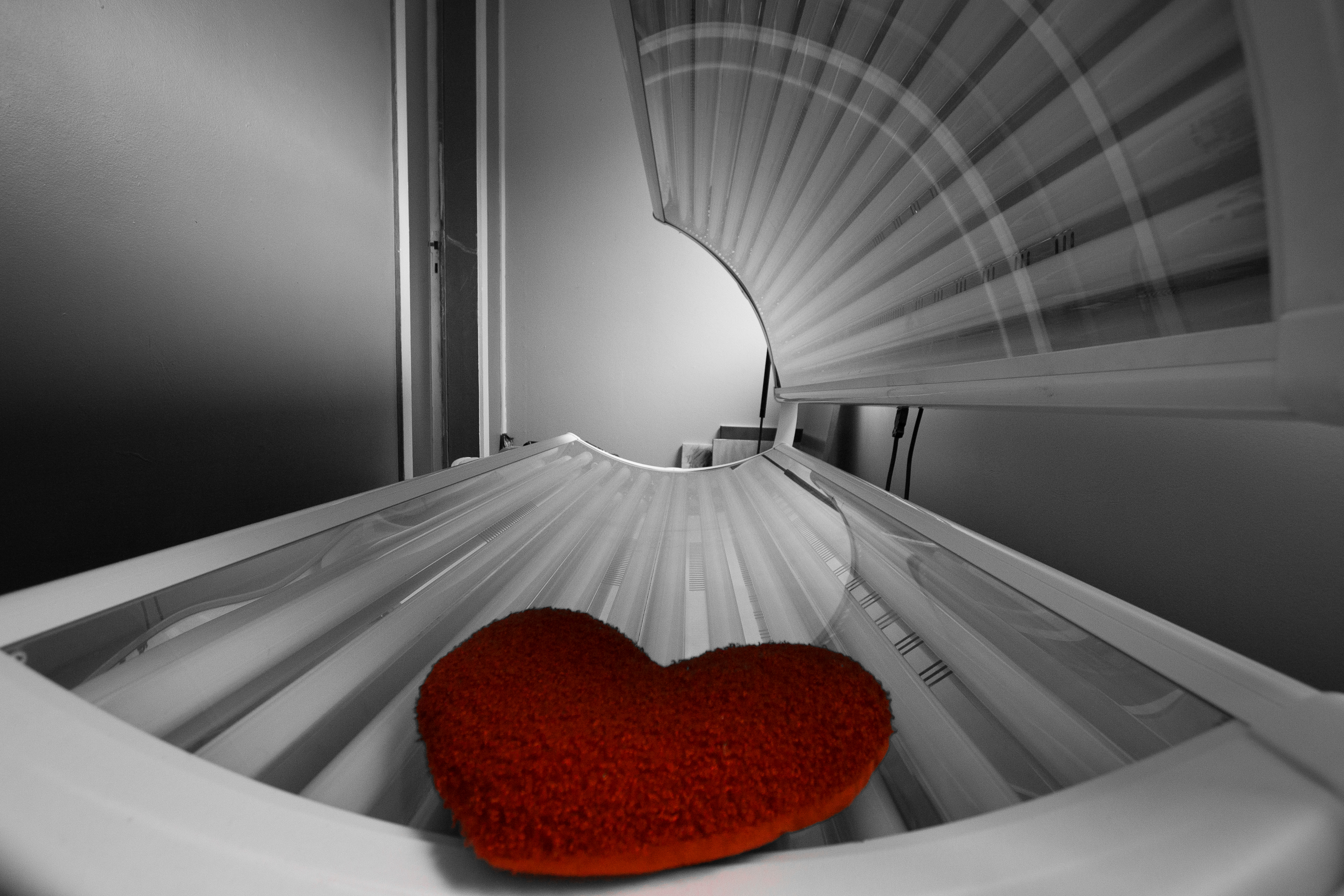
A tanning bed

Tanning dependence or tanorexia (a portmanteau of tanning and anorexia) is a syndrome where an individual appears to have a physical or psychological dependence on sunbathing or the use of ultraviolet (UV) tanning beds to darken the complexion of the skin. Compulsive tanning can satisfy the definition of a behavioral addiction as well.

== Medical evidence ==
Tanning dependence may have a physiological basis involving endogenous opioids. There is evidence that UV exposure produces beta-endorphin in the epidermis and conflicting evidence of this opioid being released into the blood system, a pathway to the brain. A small study also found the opioid antagonist naltrexone reduced preference for UV tanning beds and at higher doses produced withdraw symptoms in frequent tanners. Better understanding of tanning dependence requires further controlled studies, especially in imaging and neurobiology.

The finding that excessive tanning can lead to dependence is based upon "the observations of many dermatologists." Dermatologists tell researchers that although they advise their patients not to visit tanning beds because of the risk of melanoma, patients still do. In a 2014 literature review, researchers wrote that many people who tan excessively meet psychiatry's symptom criteria for substance abuse. In a case where ten studies provided data for the assessment of melanoma risk among subjects who reported “ever” being exposed compared with those “never” exposed, a positive association was found between exposure and risk.

The effects of tanning dependence include, but are not limited to skin cancer, skin burns, premature skin aging, and eye damage (both short and long-term).

== Example cases ==
Extreme instances may be an indication of body dysmorphic disorder (BDD), a mental disorder in which one is extremely critical of his or her physique or self-image to an obsessive and compulsive degree. As it is with anorexia, a person with BDD is said to show signs of a characteristic called distorted body image. In layman's terms, anorexia sufferers commonly believe they are overweight, many times claiming they see themselves as "fat", when in reality, they are often, but not always, nutritionally underweight and physically much thinner than the average person. In the same way, a sufferer of "tanorexia" may believe him or herself to have a much lighter – even a pale – complexion when he or she is actually quite dark-skinned.

Neither tanning dependence nor tanorexia is covered under the latest edition of the Diagnostic and Statistical Manual of Mental Disorders. However, a 2005 article in The Archives of Dermatology presents a case for UV light tanning dependence to be viewed as a type of substance abuse disorder.

=== Tan Mom ===
In 2012, New Jersey mother Patricia Krentcil received national media attention amid accusations that she had brought her five-year-old daughter with her to a tanning salon for the child to receive a tan. The child's school nurse had expressed concern over her sunburn, at which point the daughter claimed she had gone "tanning with Mommy". This prompted the school to call Division of Youth and Family Services, as New Jersey law bans children under 14 from tanning booths. Initial media coverage of the event resulted in widespread attention given to Patricia Krentcil's unusually bronzed image, leading many to speculate that she was tanorexic. She was subsequently charged with second-degree child endangerment, and she was banned from over 60 tanning salons in the tri-state area. Patricia claimed that it was all a misunderstanding, saying her daughter was never exposed to the tanning booth's UV rays and instead got slightly sunburned while playing outside on a warm day. She was later cleared of the charge. At one point, she was challenged to stop tanning for one month, which she did, greatly changing her appearance. She claimed it made her feel "weird and pale", and that she would cut back on tanning but not eliminate it from her hobbies. A Connecticut-based business also attempted to seize and capitalize on the "tan mom" craze by creating an action figure doll of Patricia.

== Treatment ==
Excessive tanning increases the risk of developing certain types of skin cancer. People that are addicted to tanning are dealing with a body dysmorphic disorder (BDD). People with tanorexia dislike the color of their skin but in reality the perceived defect may be only a slight imperfection or non-existent. Commonly, people who are suffering from tanorexia also suffer from anxiety disorders such as obsessive-compulsive disorder, depression, and eating disorders.

To get the right treatment for tanorexia, people must mention specifically their concerns with their appearance when they talk to a doctor or mental health professional. Effective treatments that are available at the moment are cognitive behavioral therapy, antidepressant medications, hypnosis and addiction treatment centers. Antidepressant medications include selective serotonin reuptake inhibitors and can help relieve the obsessive and compulsive symptoms of tanorexia. The third treatment is an audio hypnosis session, which is developed by psychologists with extensive experience in helping people beat all kinds of addictive behaviour patterns. Lastly, people with an extreme tanning addiction can look for help at specific addiction centres that are spread throughout the United States.

== Tanning culture in the Western Hemisphere ==
In Western European culture, pale skin has indicated high status. A tan signified that you had to work outdoors as a manual laborer, while pale skin announced that you could afford to stay out of the sun and spend time and money cultivating your appearance. In the 1920s, pioneering fashion designer Coco Chanel popularized the idea of tanning. She made it so the sun represented pleasure and relaxation as well as wealth. Post Industrial Revolution, tanning gained popularity because at this time it was easier to be employed, and therefore there was less outdoor manual labor, and more indoor labor. Due to more indoor jobs, a tan began to mean that you had the leisure time to bronze your skin and the money to travel to places where it could be acquired. A tan also represented enthusiasm for outdoor activities, as well as physical fitness and good health.

When the tanning bed was implemented, the concept of tanning changed yet again. The first self-tanner, Tan-Man, was introduced in 1959, and UV tanning beds started to appear in the United States in 1978. A study conducted at Pepperdine University in 2005 found that 25 percent of beach-goers showed signs of tanning addiction or tanorexia. Since the implementation of tanning beds in the United States, nearly 30 million people tan indoors every year.

There have been health issues related to tanning trends. In 2014, most Australian states banned all commercial tanning beds. It is the second nation after Brazil to impose restrictions. In 2011, over 2,000 people died from skin cancer in Australia. Several European countries and American States have banned the use of tanning beds by minors. Scientists have also suspected that frequent exposure to UVs has the potential to become addictive. Researchers have found that several parts of the brain that play a role in addiction are active when people are exposed to UV rays.

== Tanning culture in the Eastern Hemisphere ==
In the mid-1990s, a new type of tanning trend appeared in Japan called Ganguro. It was a way for Japanese women to resist traditional roles for women in Japan. The style is described as having deep tans and blond, orange, or silver gray hair. Many of these women were shunned by the public and media.

== See also ==
- Body dysmorphic disorder
- Vitamin D overdose
