= Nadya Suleman =

Mother of octuplets

Natalie Suleman
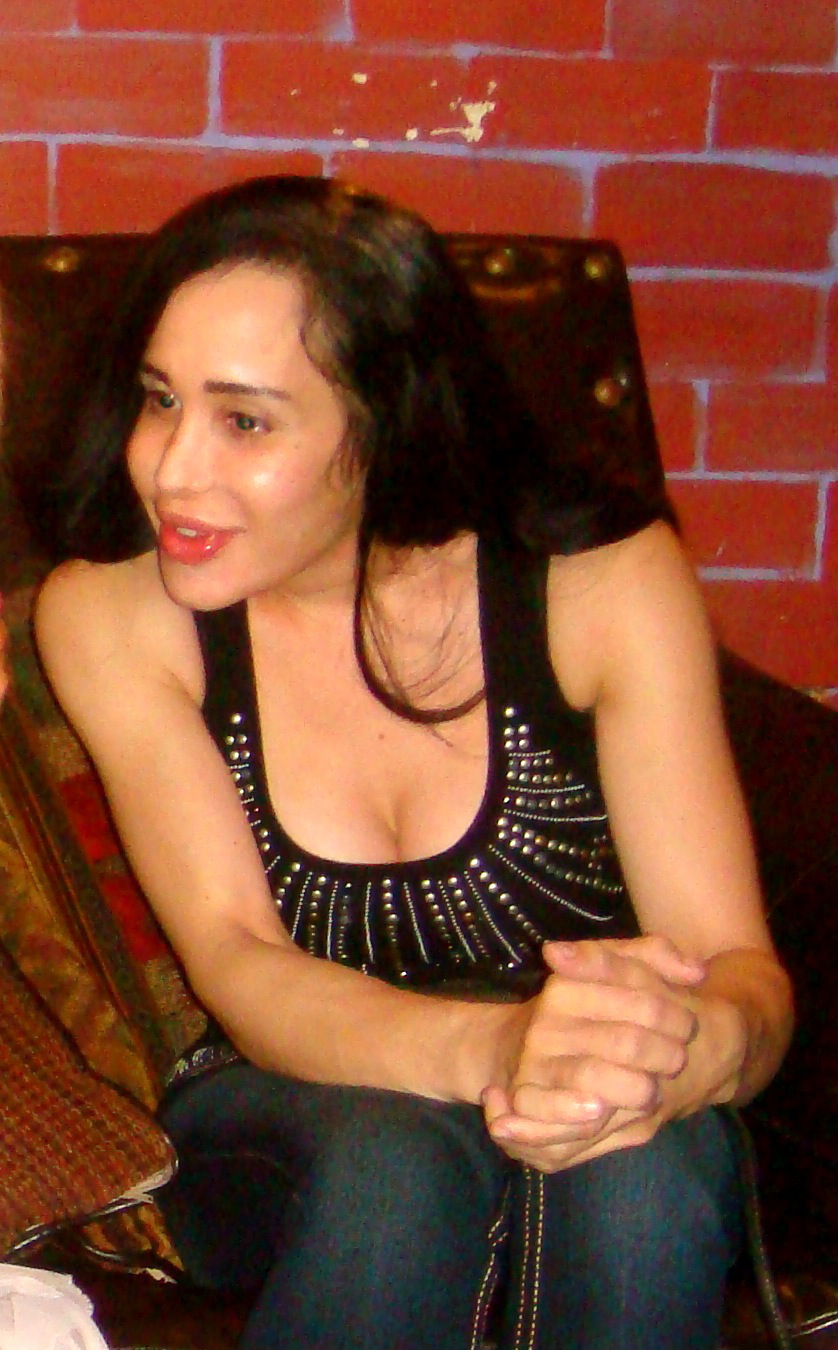
- Suleman in 2011
- Born: Nadya Denise Doud-Suleman; July 11, 1975 (age 51); Fullerton, California, U.S.
- Other name: Natalie Denise Suleman (current full name)
- Known for: Suleman octuplets
- Spouse: Marcos Gutierrez (m. 1996; div. 2008)
- Children: 14
- Parents: Edward Doud Suleman (father); Angela Victoria Stanaitis (mother)

Natalie Denise Suleman (born Nadya Denise Doud-Suleman; July 11, 1975), known as Octomom in the media, is an American media personality who came to international attention when she gave birth to the first surviving octuplets in January 2009. The circumstances of their high-order multiple birth led to controversy in the field of assisted reproductive technology as well as an investigation by the Medical Board of California of the fertility specialist involved.

Suleman conceived the octuplets and her six older children via in vitro fertilization (IVF).

== Early life ==
Suleman was born in Fullerton, California. (Note: She was born in Orange County, which supports Fullerton as her place of birth vs. Bellflower (Los Angeles County) which is sometimes reported.) She is the only child of Angela Victoria Suleman (born Stanaitis), a schoolteacher of Lithuanian descent and Edward Doud Suleman, a Palestinian restaurant owner turned realtor who served as a translator in Iraq. She attended Nogales High School in La Puente, California, where she was known as Natalie Doud, and later Mt. San Antonio College in Walnut where she earned a psychiatric technician license. She received a B.S. in child development from California State University and worked for a state mental hospital for three years.

== Marriage and divorce ==
In 1996, Suleman married Marco Gutierrez. They separated in 2000 and Gutierrez filed for divorce in November 2006. The divorce was finalized in January 2008.

== Children ==
Suleman began IVF treatments at age 21 in 1997, under the supervision of Dr. Michael Kamrava, who was later expelled from the American Society for Reproductive Medicine.

In 2001, Suleman gave birth to her first son, Elijah. In 2002, she gave birth to her first daughter, Amerah. Suleman continued IVF treatments, which resulted in three further pregnancies, including two more sons, Joshua and Aidan, and one set of fraternal twins, Calyssa and Caleb, for a total of six children: four sons and two daughters. In 2019, Suleman revealed that her son, Aidan, is "severely autistic" and "requires complete assistance in meeting all needs in activities of daily living." Suleman is a vegan and says that most of her children prefer vegan food.

=== Octuplets ===
In 2009, Suleman stated that Dr. Kamrava had implanted an excessive six embryos during each of her IVF treatments, with the Medical Board of California citing seven instances of the doctor's gross negligence from 2002-2008. According to ASRM guidelines at the time, a woman her age would normally have no more than two embryos transferred. Beginning with the first egg retrieval in 2000, Suleman's extra embryos had been frozen and stored with Dr. Kamrava. Despite this, fresh cycles of hormone therapy and egg retrieval were performed for each of Suleman's pregnancies, instead of using the frozen embryos already available. In June 2011, during an investigation by the Medical Board of California, it was found that Kamrava had transferred twelve embryos, which the board found to be an "extreme" departure from standard of care. After reviewing Suleman's case, in combination with three other cases, the Medical Board of California voted to revoke Kamrava's medical license, effective July 1, 2011.

News of the octuplets caused an international media sensation. Public response was largely negative and included death threats. There has been much public discussion about Suleman's decision to have the octuplets, including a minor protest outside the Suleman home. Many expressed concern that Suleman's decision to have these children would burden taxpayers with financial support. Suleman claimed to be able to independently support her children, saying she was planning to return to school to complete a master's degree in counseling. Records showed that Suleman was unemployed after having received disability benefits between 2002 and 2008, as compensation for a back injury sustained in September 1999 during an incident at a previous job.

In February 2009, television host Phil McGraw questioned whether the octuplets would be released from the hospital, while Suleman expressed concern about losing custody of them. In March, Suleman bought a new house in La Habra. In the early morning hours of April 1, the day she would bring home the seventh octuplet, vandals threw a baby seat through the back window of her Toyota minivan. By April 14, 2009, all of the children were home with their mother and grandmother. The octuplets celebrated their first birthday on January 26, 2010. Suleman told People magazine, "I don't get much sleep, but I'm used to that. Once one of the kids gets up, they all get up. Some nights I don't sleep at all or as little as half an hour. On the good nights, I may get up to two full hours. The longest I've gone without sleeping is 72 hours. It's hard, but I'm continuing to move forward with my life and trying to be the best mother I can be."

== Public profile ==
Suleman quickly became notorious with the birth of octuplets. Within the first week, the media dubbed her "Octomom". Suleman hired the Killeen Furtney Group as her initial public relations company, with Wes Yoder providing a small amount of pro bono advice. Both groups soon ended their involvement after receiving death threats. Her next spokesman was Victor Munoz, who quit on March 6, 2009.

Suleman has appeared on many television shows, starting with a February 2009 interview with Ann Curry. Suleman rejected suggestions that her decisions have been selfish or that she would not be able to care for her children, stating: "I know I'll be able to afford them when I'm done with my schooling. If I were just sitting down watching TV and not being as determined as I am to succeed and provide a better future for my children, I believe that would be considered, to a certain degree, selfish." Suleman would make another appearance later in March on Dr. Phil alongside fellow guest Gloria Allred. Allred had a list of criticisms regarding Suleman's performance as mother and homemaker.

On April 16, 2009, Suleman revealed she struck a deal for a reality TV show in the UK, though The Hollywood Reporter said some U.S. networks were reluctant to pick up the show. Suleman signed an agreement with the Los Angeles Superior Court on July 24 to have each of her children earn $250 a day to star in a reality show; filming was set to begin on September 1. On May 4, 2009, it was announced that Allred had filed a case with Orange County Superior Court requesting that a guardian be appointed to protect the rights of the infants. FOX later aired its own two-hour special titled Octo-Mom: The Incredible Unseen Footage. There were many parodies and other media events based on the story, including a 2009 musical performed in Los Angeles, which Suleman was not involved with.

Suleman was featured in the February 2010 issue of Star, where she gave an interview. Several pictorials followed, focused mainly on her weight loss since delivering the octuplets a year earlier.

In April 2010, Suleman was on The Oprah Winfrey Show and Idol Gives Back, in which she denied claims that she had received plastic surgery and stated that she refused to star in pornographic movies. She added that she had seriously rethought her decision to give birth to and raise her children, and that she hoped to become a teacher. She made another appearance on The Oprah Winfrey Show, where she asked and received help from Suze Orman about financial issues that she was then facing with her children and discussed her hoarding disorder developed from childhood.

In March 2012, Suleman posed seminude for the UK magazine Closer.

On April 30, 2012, Suleman filed for personal bankruptcy. Suleman said she had $50,000 in assets and up to $1 million in debts. Her home in La Habra was set to go up for auction. Earlier, she was accused of neglecting her children while spending hundreds of dollars on herself for services such as Brazilian blowouts. However, after visiting her house, social workers determined that the children were not in danger and should not be removed.

Suleman checked herself into Chapman House Treatment Center in Los Angeles on October 23, 2012, for 28 days or more for rehabilitation for anxiety, exhaustion, and stress. She had been taking Xanax under a doctor's care for her problems.

Suleman appears in the music video of Cledus T. Judd's "Honeymoon" as his bride.

On January 13, 2014, Suleman was accused of welfare fraud by the state of California for failing to disclose nearly $30,000 in earnings. On July 14, she pleaded no contest to a single count of misdemeanor welfare fraud for failing to disclose income she was receiving from videos and personal appearances while collecting more than $26,000 in public assistance funds to care for her 14 children. Suleman was sentenced to 200 hours of community service and two years of probation, and ordered to pay a small fine. Her attorney, Arthur J. LaCilento, said that with financial help from friends, his client has already repaid the county welfare system. Before making her plea, Suleman had been facing four felony charges, including perjury and welfare fraud, in the case.

In 2012, Suleman starred in the film 666 the Devil's Child, a low-budget horror film that centers upon a couple that visits a woman they met on the Internet, only for strange things to occur. Suleman portrays the character Vanessa, a film student.

In 2017, Suleman was interviewed for the Bravo network program Andy Cohen's Then & Now.

In March 2019, the Australian current affairs program Sunday Night interviewed Suleman for the octuplets' tenth birthday. She conceded that although at the time she was "absolutely [...] young, dumb, irresponsible, selfish, reckless", she does not regret any of her children. The feature noted that the household is run with "military precision", and the children are "happy, healthy, and well-mannered".

Beginning in March 2025, Lifetime released a six-part documentary series on Suleman titled Confessions of Octomom.

== Career ==
In June 2012, Suleman recorded a single with recording artist Adam Barta after she appeared in an alternate cut of his "Q&A" music video, where she was heard saying, "Let's do a duet, on my new album!" In 2012, Suleman appeared in the adult film Octomom Home Alone produced by Wicked Pictures. The film was released on June 20, 2012. In December 2012, Octomom Home Alone received four AVN Award nominations and won for Best Celebrity Video.

Suleman worked as an adult entertainer dancing in men's clubs. She released a single called "Sexy Party" with Adam Barta in September, and he held her breasts while surrounded by crucifixes on a bed on the compact disc artwork, a cover she said was inspired by the work of Madonna. In October 2012, Suleman was paid to participate in the launch of an internet debate site, Deeyoon.com, including doing an online debate on parenting with Michael Lohan.

== Adaptation ==
In 2025, Nadya Suleman's life was depicted in the Lifetime film I Was Octomom: The Natalie Suleman Story. While Suleman narrated the film, it also stars Kristen Gutoskie as Suleman, Caitlin Stryker as Suleman's best friend Beth, and Anita Wittenberg as Angela Suleman.
